= Hundred of Wokurna =

- Cadastral division
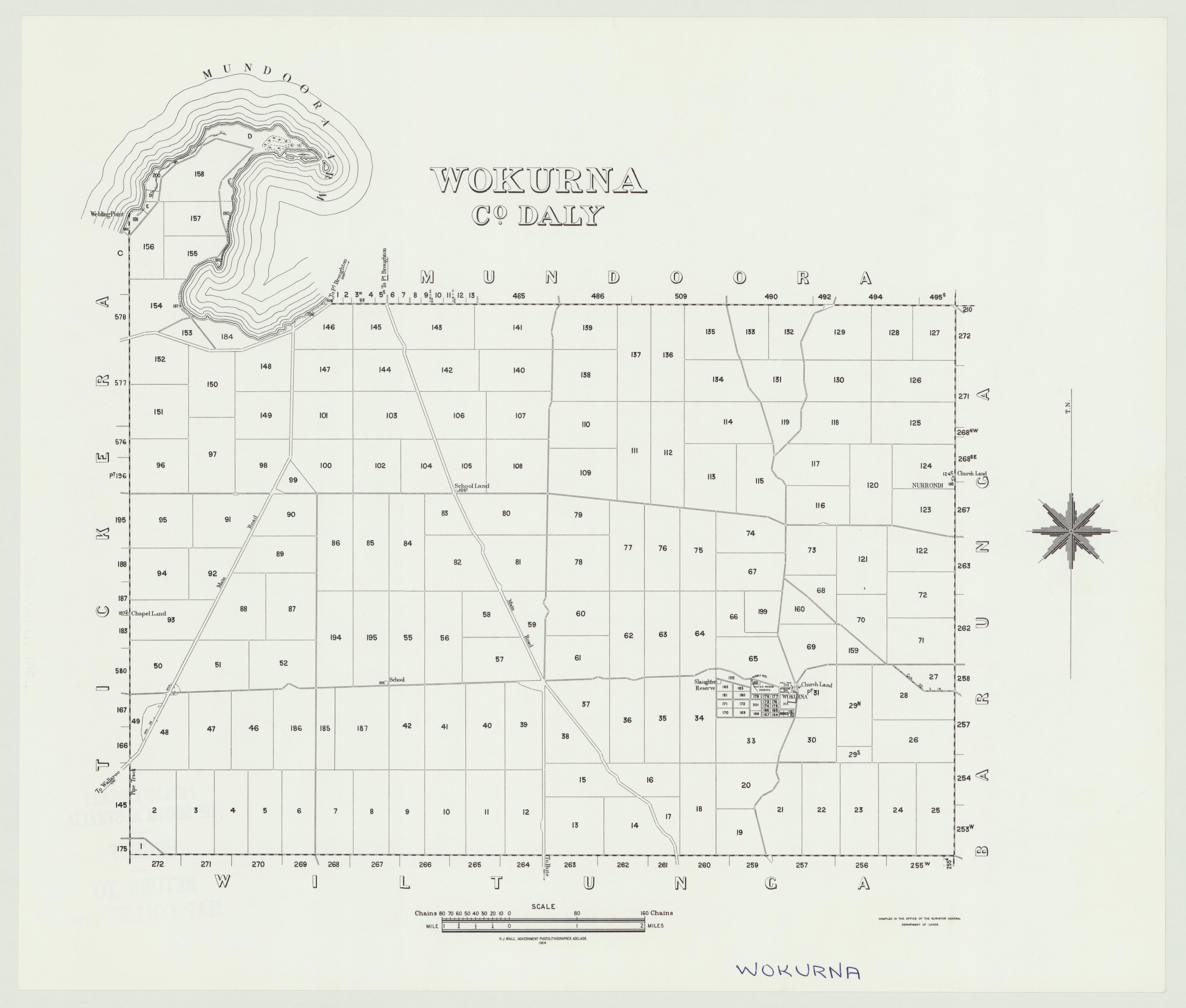
- 1964 cadastral map of the Hundred of Wokurna

- Coordinates: 33.685°S 137.983°E
- Country: Australia
- State: South Australia
- Region: Mid North
- LGA: Barunga West
- Established: 31 December 1874

Area
  - Total: 270 km^{2} (104 sq mi)
- County: Daly
Lands administrative divisions around Hundred of Wokurna
Spencer Gulf	Mundoora	Redhill
Tickera	Hundred of Wokurna	Barunga
Tickera	Wiltunga	Barunga

The Hundred of Wokurna is a cadastral unit of hundred located in the Mid North of South Australia west of the Barunga Range. It is one of the 16 hundreds of the County of Daly and was proclaimed by Governor Anthony Musgrave on the last day of 1874.

The hamlet of Wokurna lies near the south-eastern border of the hundred and locality bounds cover more than a quarter of the hundred. A large portion of Port Broughton occupies the hundred as well as small portions of Ward Hill and Mundoora.

== Local government ==
The District Council of Broughton was established in 1888 by promulgation of the District Councils Act 1887, bringing the hundred under local administration for the first time. The council area included the Hundred of Wokurna as well as three adjacent hundreds. In 1892 the Hundred of Workurna and part of the Hundred of Mundoora seceded from Broughton council to form the District Council of Mundoora, later called Port Broughton, reflecting the council seat location in that town. In 1997 Port Broughton council was amalgamated with the District Council of Bute bringing the hundred under the governance of the new District Council of Barunga West.
