= Electoral district of Young (South Australia) =

Former South Australian state electoral district

Coordinates: 33°35′S 137°56′E

Young South Australia—House of Assembly
- State: South Australia
- Created: 1938
- Abolished: 1956
- Namesake: Henry Young
- Demographic: Rural

Young was an electoral district of the House of Assembly in the Australian state of South Australia from 1938 to 1956.

At its inception, the electorate included Alford, Blyth, Brinkworth, Bute, Cunliffe, Everard Central, Hart, Koolunga, Kulpara, Kybunga, Lochiel, Melton, Mundoora, Ninnes, Paskeville, Percyton, Port Broughton, Redhill, Rochester, Snowtown, South Hummocks, Thomas Plains, Thrington, Tickera, Wandilta Mines (now in northeastern Kadina), Wokurna and Yacka.

== Members ==
Member	Party	Term
Robert Nicholls	Liberal and Country	1938–1956
