= Hundred of Wiltunga =

Wiltunga
- Cadastral division
- Coordinates: 33.811°S 137.981°E
- Country: Australia
- State: South Australia
- Region: Mid North
- LGA(s): Barunga West
- Established: 31 December 1874

Area
  - Total: 280 km^{2} (110 sq mi)
- County: Daly
Lands administrative divisions around Wiltunga
Tickera	Wokurna	Barunga
Tickera	Wiltunga	Barunga; Cameron
Kadina	Ninnes	Cameron

The Hundred of Wiltunga is a cadastral unit of hundred located in the Mid North of South Australia west of the Barunga Range. It is one of the 16 hundreds of the County of Daly and was proclaimed by Governor Anthony Musgrave on the last day of 1874.

The hundred name is officially believed to derive from an indigenous term wiltonga, meaning 'place of the eagles'. The township of Bute lies near the southern border of the hundred and locality bounds cover most of the hundred. The eastern flank of Alford locality and southern flank of Wokurna locality are also within the hundred

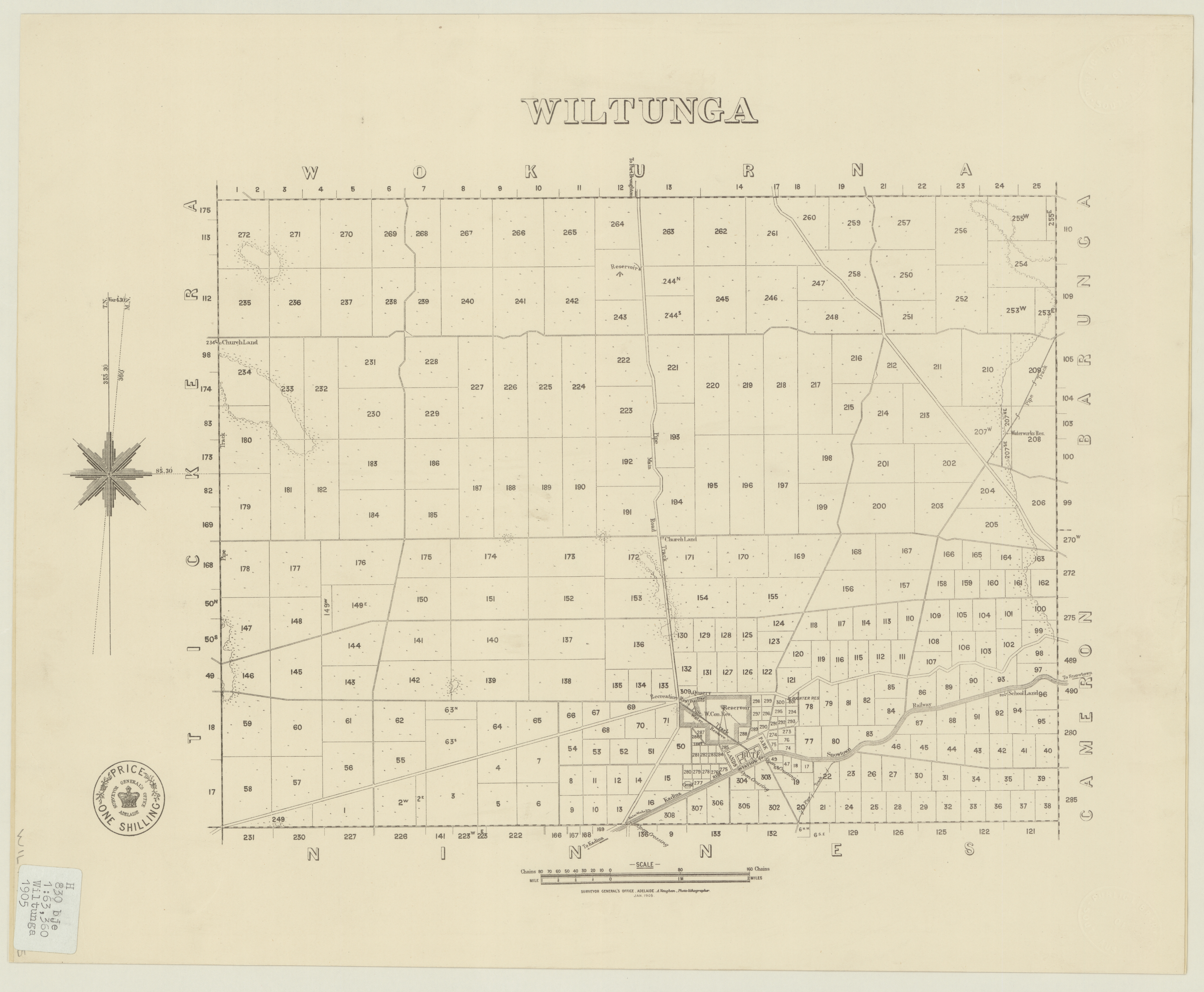
Plan of the Hundred of Wiltunga in 1905 showing the Government Town of Bute

== Local government ==
The District Council of Ninnes was established in 1885 at Ninnes, and, in 1888, it annexed the Hundred of Wiltunga by promulgation of the District Councils Act 1887, bringing the hundred under local administration for the first time. In 1933 the council name was changed to Bute, reflecting the new council seat location in that town. In 1997 Bute council was amalgamated with the District Council of Port Broughton bringing the hundred under the governance of the District Council of Barunga West.
