= Barunga =

Barunga is a name associated with several areas in Australia:

- In the Northern Territory
  - Barunga, Northern Territory, Aboriginal community southeast of Katherine
    - Barunga Statement, 1988 statement of Aboriginal political objectives
- In South Australia
  - Barunga Gap, South Australia, locality in the Mid North of the state
  - Barunga West Council, local government area
  - Barunga Range, small mountain range
  - Hundred of Barunga, cadastral unit for land tenure
