= Burnsfield, South Australia =

Burnsfield South Australia
- Coordinates: 33°41′46″S 138°12′54″E
- Population: 6 (SAL 2021)
- Postcode(s): 5520
- Elevation: 128 m (420 ft)
- Location: 23 km (14 mi) N of Lake Bumbunga
- LGA(s): Wakefield Regional Council
- State electorate(s): Frome
- Federal division(s): Grey
Localities around Burnsfield:
Mundoora	Lake View, Collinsfield	Koolunga
Hope Gap, Wokurna	Burnsfield	Brinkworth
Barunga Gap	Snowtown	Condowie

Burnsfield is a locality in South Australia's Mid North. It is north of Snowtown on the eastern side of the Augusta Highway. The locality is named for the Burnsfield railway station which was near the southwestern corner of the locality. The station was named for the Burns family, owners of the land at the time of and prior to the Salisbury-Redhill railway construction in 1925. The Burns family first took up land at the site at the western foot of the Hummocks Range in about 1878.

In 2011, an eight-year mining lease was granted to mine salt from a 83-hectare (210-acre) site in the north west of Burnsfield.

== See also ==
- List of cities and towns in South Australia
