= Hundred of Barunga =

- Cadastral division
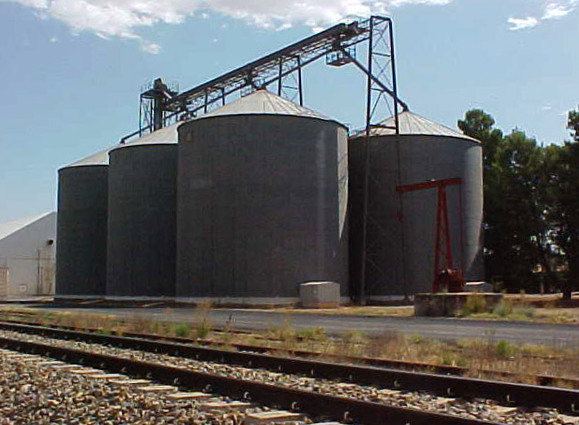
- Grain silos beside railway track at Snowtown

- Coordinates: 33.72°S 138.17°E
- Country: Australia
- State: South Australia
- Region: Mid North
- LGA(s): Wakefield
- Established: 15 July 1869

Area
  - Total: 330 km^{2} (129 sq mi)
- County: Daly
Lands administrative divisions around Hundred of Barunga
Mundoora	Redhill	Koolunga
Wiltunga	Barunga	Boucaut
Ninnes	Cameron	Everard

The Hundred of Barunga is a cadastral unit of hundred located in the Mid North of South Australia on the approximate area of the Barunga Range, centred on Bald Hill. It is one of the 16 hundreds of the County of Daly. It was named in 1869 by Governor James Fergusson after an indigenous term meaning gap in the range. See Barunga Range § Etymology

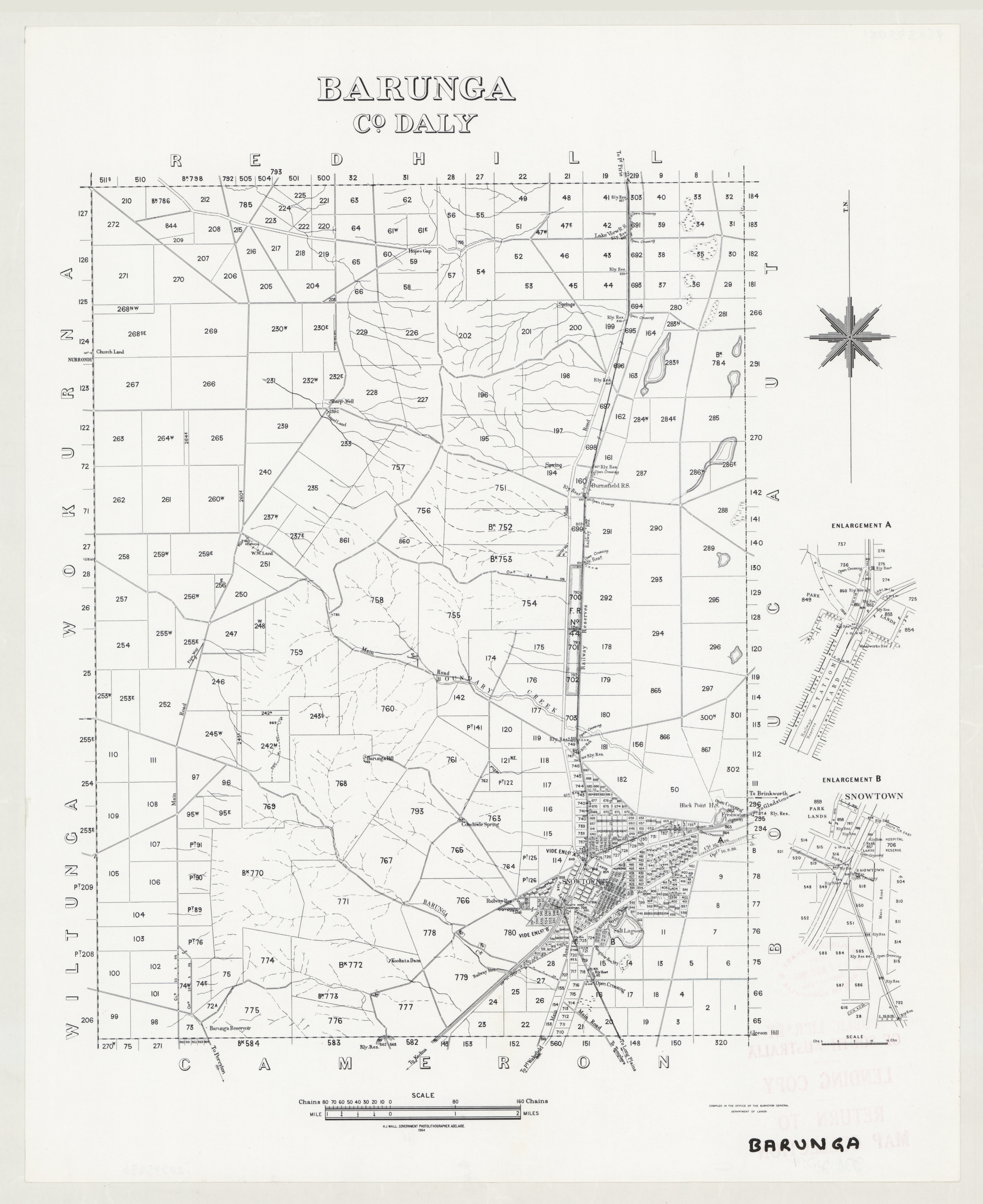
Plan of the Hundred of Barunga, 1964

The following localities and towns of the Wakefield Council area are situated inside (or largely inside) the bounds of the Hundred of Barunga:

- Snowtown (most part)
- Hope Gap
- Mundoora (southeast quadrant only)
- Lake View (western half)
- Burnsfield (western half)
- Wokurna (eastern half)
- Barunga Gap (northern half)

== Local government ==
On 5 January 1888 the District Council of Snowtown was established, along with many other new local government bodies in South Australia, by the District Councils Act 1887, incorporating the entirety of the hundreds of Barunga and Boucaut. The Hundred of Barunga contained the Barunga and Snowtown wards of the council.

In 1987 Barunga and Snowtown wards of the Snowtown council retained their statuses as a ward in the consolidated District Council of Blyth-Snowtown. Since the amalgamation of Blyth-Snowtown and Wakefield Plains councils into the new Wakefield Regional Council the hundred has been a part of the much larger North ward of the Wakefield council.

== See also ==
- Lands administrative divisions of South Australia
