= County of Daly =

Daly South Australia
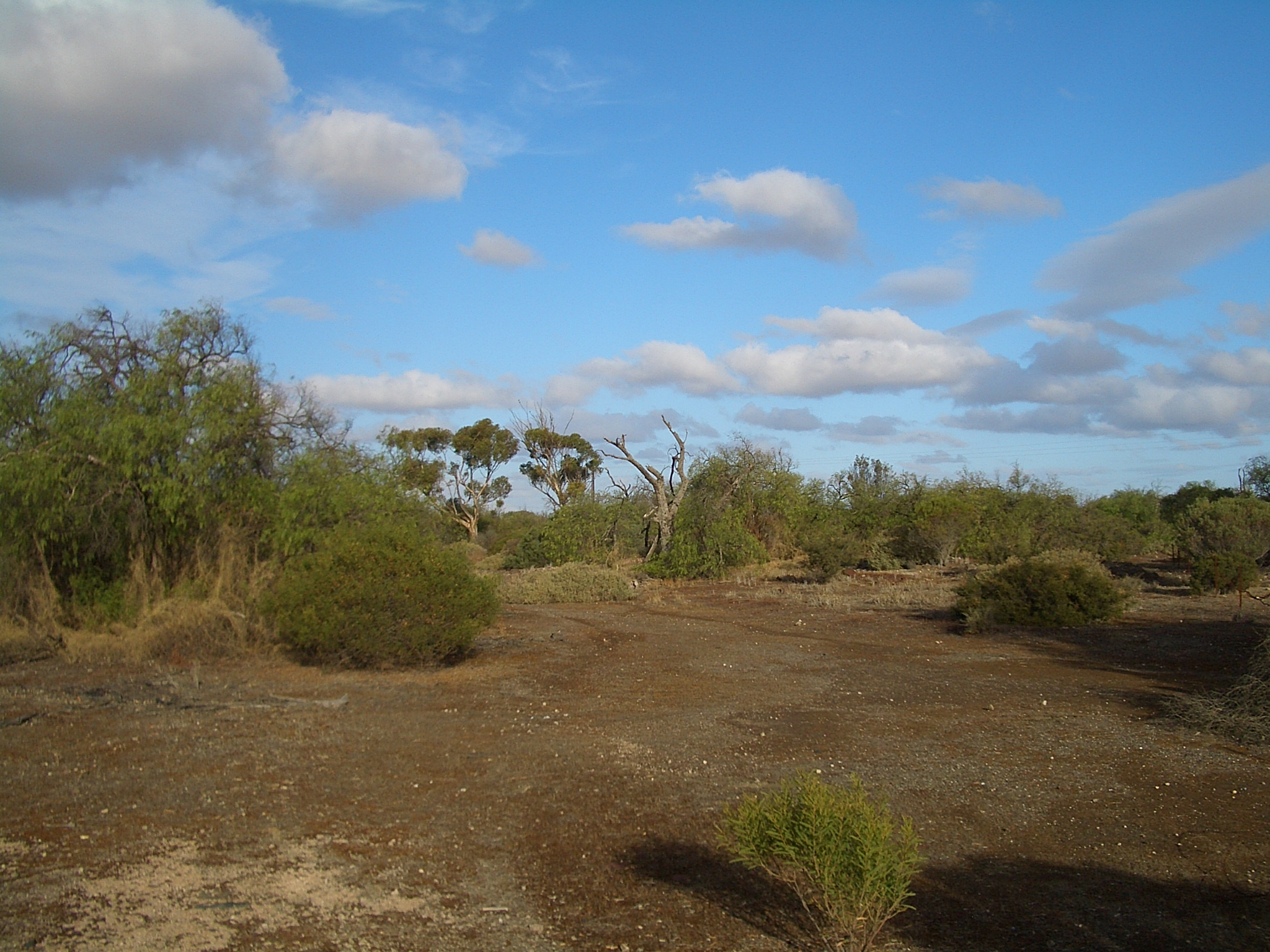
- Abandoned Wallaroo Mines site in the Hundred of Wallaroo

- Coordinates: 33.89°S 137.95°E
- Established: 1862
- Area: 4,294 km^{2} (1,657.9 sq mi)
- LGA(s): District Council of Barunga West; Copper Coast Council; Wakefield Regional Council; Port Pirie Regional Council; Yorke Peninsula Council
Lands administrative divisions around Daly:
Spencer Gulf	Victoria	Victoria
Spencer Gulf	Daly	Stanley
Spencer Gulf	Fergusson	Gawler

The County of Daly is one of the 49 cadastral counties of South Australia. It was proclaimed in 1862 and named for Governor Dominick Daly. It covers the northern half of Yorke Peninsula stretching just east of the Hummock-Barunga Range in the west and just past the Broughton River in the north.

== Hundreds ==
The county is divided into the following sixteen hundreds from north to south:

- Hundred of Mundoora (Fisherman Bay, Clements Gap, Mundoora, Port Broughton)
- Hundred of Redhill (Redhill, Mundoora, Collinsfield)
- Hundred of Wokurna (Port Broughton, Wokurna)
- Hundred of Barunga (Snowtown, Hope Gap)
- Hundred of Tickera (Tickera, Alford)
- Hundred of Wiltunga (Bute)
- Hundred of Cameron (Bumbunga, Lochiel, Barunga Gap)
- Hundred of Ninnes (Ninnes, Thomas Plain)
- Hundred of Kadina (Kadina, Willamulka, Thrington)
- Hundred of Wallaroo (Wallaroo, Kadina, Moonta)
- Hundred of Kulpara (Kulpara, Paskeville, South Hummocks, Melton)
- Hundred of Clinton (Kainton, Clinton, Port Arthur)
- Hundred of Tiparra (Nalyappa, Agery, Sunnyvale, Arthurton, Weetulta)
