= Hundred of Redhill =

Redhill
- Cadastral division
- Coordinates: 33°32′S 138°13′E
- Country: Australia
- State: South Australia
- Region: Mid North
- LGA(s): Port Pirie
- Established: 15 July 1869

Area
  - Total: 270 km^{2} (105 sq mi)
- County: Daly
Lands administrative divisions around Redhill
Wandearah	Crystal Brook	Narridy
Mundoora	Redhill	Koolunga
Wokurna	Barunga	Boucaut

The Hundred of Redhill is a cadastral unit of hundred located in the Mid North of South Australia spanning the northern Barunga Range. It is one of the 16 hundreds of the County of Daly and was named in 1869 by Governor James Fergusson after the same hill giving rise to the name for the township of Redhill, uphill from the west bank of the Broughton River.

The town of Redhill and the locality of Collinsfield are inside the Hundred of Redhill as well as the east half of Clements Gap and a north eastern portion of Mundoora.

== Local government ==
The District Council of Broughton was established in 1888 to locally govern the hundreds of Redhill, Mundoora, Wokurna and Koolunga, each of the four constituent hundreds forming a ward of the council. The council was renamed to the District Council of Red Hill (later Redhill) in 1912.

From 1988, the Redhill ward, matching hundred boundaries, remained a ward in the larger District Council of Crystal Brook-Redhill following amalgamation of Redhill and Crystal Brook councils.

From 1997 the hundred became part of the much larger Port Pirie Regional Council following a merger between Crystal Brook-Redhill and the Port Pirie City councils.
