= Hundred of Ninnes =

Ninnes
- Cadastral division
- Coordinates: 33.936°S 137.979°E
- Country: Australia
- State: South Australia
- Region: Mid North
- LGA(s): Barunga West
- Established: December 31, 1874; 150 years ago

Area
  - Total: 240 km^{2} (94 sq mi)
- County: Daly
Lands administrative divisions around Ninnes
Tickera	Wiltunga	Cameron
Kadina	Ninnes	Cameron
Kadina	Kulpara	Kulpara

The Hundred of Ninnes is a cadastral unit of hundred located in the Mid North of South Australia centred on the Ninnes Plain. It is one of the 16 hundreds of the County of Daly and was proclaimed by Governor Anthony Musgrave on the last day of 1874.

There are no towns within the hundred boundaries. The majority is taken up by the bounded localities of Ninnes and Thomas Plain. The bounded localities of Willamulka, Alford, Bute and Paskeville overlap the northwestern and southern boundaries.

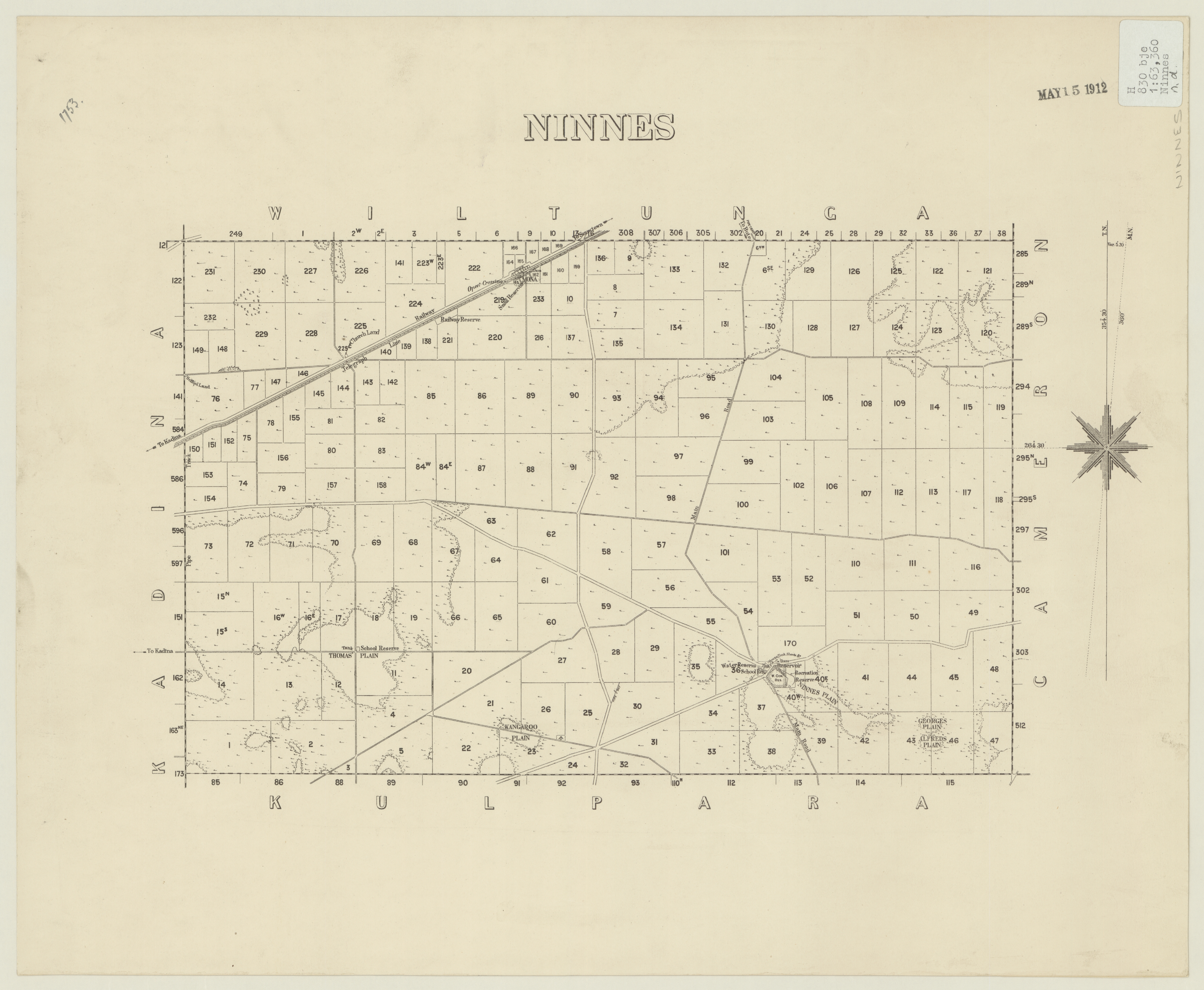
Plan of Hundred of Ninnes, 1912

The hundred was named for the Ninnes Plain which in turn was named after the local landowner, Thomas Ninnes.

== Local government ==
The District Council of Ninnes was established in 1885 at Ninnes, bringing the hundred under local administration for the first time. Over the years the council was expanded both north and south to include more significant townships such as Bute, Alford and Kulpara. In 1933 the council name was changed to Bute, reflecting the new council seat location in that town. In 1997 Bute council was amalgamated with the District Council of Port Broughton bringing the hundred under the governance of the District Council of Barunga West.
