= Yorke Peninsula Field Days =

Coordinates: 34.02165°S 137.85917°E

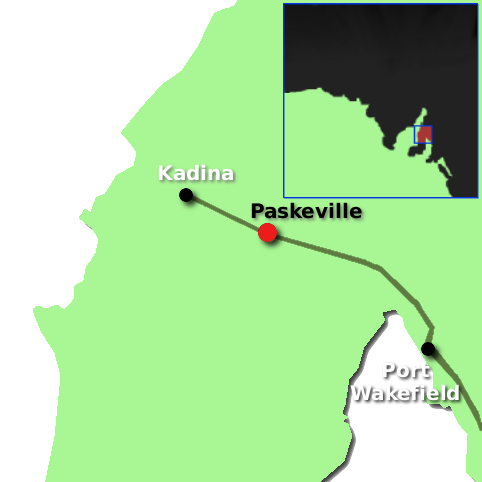
- Genre: Agricultural field day
- Begins: Last Tuesday in September
- Ends: Following Thursday
- Frequency: Biennial
- Locations: Bute (1895–1972); Paskeville (from 1973)
- Years active: 1895–1972 in single-day format, 1973–2019, 2021- in present 3-day format
- Inaugurated: 1895
- Previous event: 26 September 2023 - 28 September 2023
- Next event: 30 September 2025 - 2 October 2025
- Attendance: 30,000–40,000
- Organiser: Yorke Peninsula Field Days Incorporated
- Website: www.ypfielddays.com.au
- Attendance of 40,000 in 2009 was reported by the Stock Journal. The organising body, Yorke Peninsula Field Days Incorporated, claims typical attendance of "up to 30,000."

The Yorke Peninsula Field Days is a biennial, three-day field days event, held on a permanent site outside Paskeville on Yorke Peninsula, South Australia. The event has a major focus on agriculture. The event is the oldest field days event in Australia and one of the biggest, exhibiting millions of dollars' worth of farm machinery.

== Description ==
Nine local branches of the Agricultural Bureau of SA comprise the organising body of the Yorke Peninsula Field Days corporation and their members are totally responsible for the management and organisation of the field day. These bureaus are: Arthurton, Boors Plains, Bute, Cunliffe W.A.B., Moonta, Paskeville, Petersville, Snowtown and South Hummocks.

As of 2006, there is a waiting list for exhibitors to get sites at the Field Days.

The event begins on a Tuesday in late September and finishes the following Thursday, opening at 9 am and closing at 5 pm each day. Annual events include sheepdog trials, guest-speakers, wool and sheep displays, including active and static displays, shearing demonstrations, a fashion parade, crafts, and general products which were introduced to the Field Days by the Cunliffe Women's Agricultural Bureau. An entrance fee is charged, and a record crowd of 40,000 people gathered for the 2009 field days.

== History ==
The field days began in 1895 as a field trial of agricultural and horticultural implements. The original branches of the Agricultural Bureau of SA that formed the Agricultural Field Trial Society (now Yorke Peninsula Field Days Incorporated) were Arthurton, Bute, Nantawarra (now South Hummocks), Paskeville, Pine Forest and Port Broughton. These branches organised the first Field Trial, as it was then known, at Bute. Until about 1973 only one event, 'Harvester Trials', was held.

From 1973, the Field Trials expanded to more than one day. In 1975 the current permanent site at Paskeville was established, after 67 acres (27 ha) were purchased from Keith Lamming (35 acres for $8000) and Stan Norris (32 acres for $7040) for a total of $15,040 in 1977. The first field days event held at the Paskeville site in 1977 was opened by Sir Thomas Playford, former South Australian Premier. Permanent roads, and some permanent pavilions and sheds, have been built at the site, with the roads being named after the current and past bureaus of the Yorke Peninsula Field Days corporation.

Despite the COVID-19 pandemic in 2021, strict standards were undertaken hereafter.

== Dates ==
- 2021: 28–30 September
- 2023: 26–28 September
- 2025: 30 September-2 October

== See also ==
- Field days in Australia
- Copper Coast
- Yorke Peninsula
