= Hope Gap, South Australia =

Hope Gap
- Town
- Coordinates: 33.64°S 138.19°E
- Country: Australia
- State: South Australia
- LGA: Wakefield Regional Council

Government
  - State electorate: Narungga
  - Federal division: Grey

Population
  - Total: 3 (SAL 2021)
- Postcode: 5555
Localities around Hope Gap
	Collinsfield
Mundoora	Hope Gap	Lake View
	Snowtown	Burnsfield

Hope Gap is a locality in the Mid North region of South Australia. It is north of Snowtown on the western side of the Augusta Highway. Hope Gap is named for a gap (previously known as Hope's Gap) in the Barunga Range on its western side which is traversed by the road from Lake View to Mundoora.

Hope Gap includes the northern part of the Snowtown Wind Farm.

William Patrick Cummins had a sheep station "Fairview" in the region.

Mount Hope Gap is a quite different location in the South East, near Rendelsham; the Mount Hope of the South East was renamed Mount Woakwine to distinguish it from Mount Hope on Eyre Peninsula.

== See also ==
- Clements Gap
- Barunga Gap
