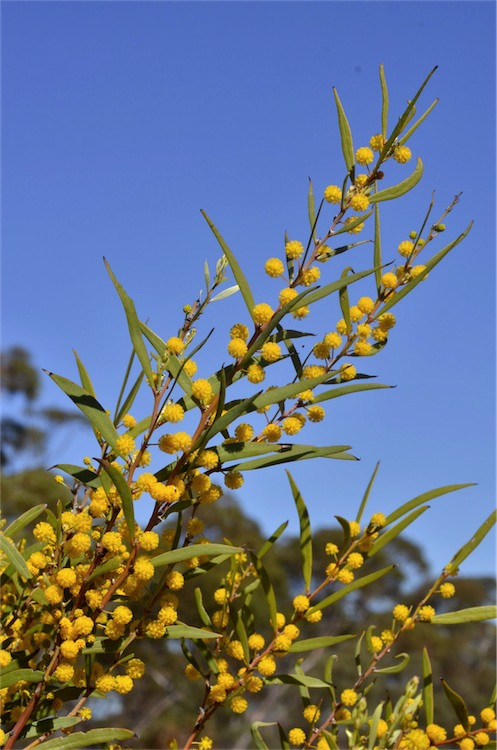

Scientific classification
- Kingdom: Plantae
- Clade: Tracheophytes
- Clade: Angiosperms
- Clade: Eudicots
- Clade: Rosids
- Order: Fabales
- Family: Fabaceae
- Subfamily: Caesalpinioideae
- Clade: Mimosoid clade
- Genus: Acacia
- Species: A. halliana

Binomial name
- Acacia halliana Maslin
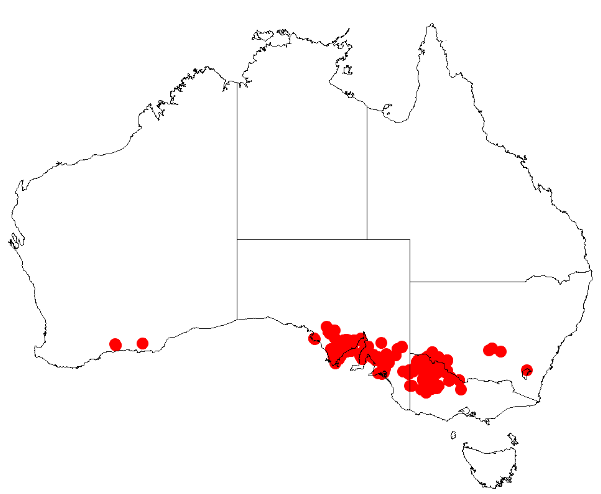
- Occurrence data from AVH

Synonyms
- List: Acacia iteaphylla var. latifolia F.Muell. p.p.; Racosperma hallianum (Maslin) Pedley; Acacia microcarpa auct. non F.Muell.: Whibley, D.J.E. & Symon, D.E. (1992), Acacias of South Australia

= Acacia halliana =

Species of plant

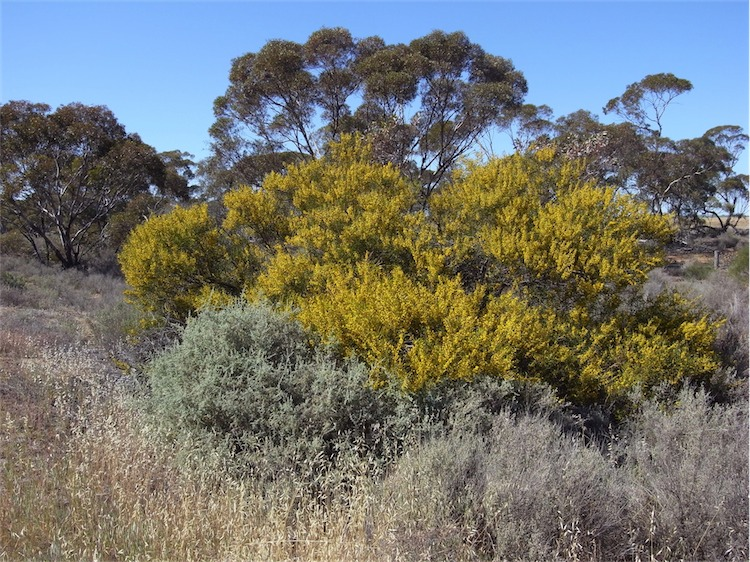
Habit near the Sturt Highway

Acacia halliana is a species of flowering plant in the family Fabaceae and is endemic to the south-east of continental Australia. It is a bushy, spreading shrub with narrowly oblong or narrowly elliptic phyllodes, spherical heads of golden yellow flowers and curved to S-shaped, firmly papery to thinly crusty black pods, resembling a string of beads.

== Description ==
Acacia halliana is a bushy, spreading shrub that typically grows to a height of up to 2.5 m (8 ft 2 in) that has flattened branchlets at first, later terete and ribbed, usually with soft hairs pressed against the surface. Its phyllodes are narrowly oblong or narrowly elliptic, sometimes lance-shaped with the narrower end towards the base, straight to slightly curved, 30–70 mm (1.2–2.8 in) long and 4–15 mm (0.16–0.59 in) wide. The phyllodes are leathery, narrowed at the tip with a more or less straight, sometimes slightly sharply pointed tip, with a gland 5–12 mm (0.20–0.47 in) above the pulvinus. The flowers are usually borne in two spherical heads in axils on peduncles 5–10 mm (0.20–0.39 in) long, each head 6 mm (0.24 in) in diameter with mostly 35 to 55 golden yellow flowers. Flowering occurs in September and October and the pods are more or less curved to S-shaped, resembling a string of beads, sometimes twisted at the constrictions, up to 60 mm (2.4 in) long, 3 mm (0.12 in) wide and firmly papery to thinly crusty and black. The seeds are oblong to elliptic, 3–4 mm (0.12–0.16 in) long and dull dark brown with a creamy white, conical aril on the end.

== Taxonomy ==
Acacia halliana was first formally described in 1987 by Bruce Maslin in the journal Nuytsia from specimens he collected 10 km (6.2 mi) north of Bute on the road to Port Broughton in 1985. The specific epithet (halliana) honours Norman Hall for his assistance to Maslin with Acacia projects.

== Distribution and habitat ==
This species of wattle grows in mallee communities in sand or loam, and occurs in south-eastern Australia from the Eyre Peninsula in South Australia, east to Euston in New South Wales and Gunbower in Victoria.

== See also ==
- List of Acacia species
