= Barunga West Council =

Coordinates: 33.6°S 137.933333°E

- Local government area
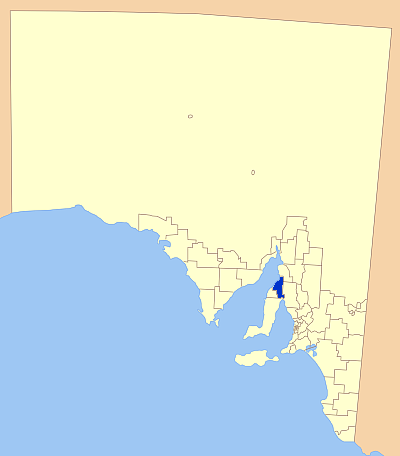
- Location of the Barunga West Council
- Interactive map of Barunga West Council
- Country: Australia
- State: South Australia
- Region: Yorke and Mid North
- Council seat: Port Broughton

Government
  - Mayor: Leonie Kerley
  - State electorate: Frome Goyder
  - Federal division: Grey

Area
  - Total: 1,528 km^{2} (590 sq mi)

Population
  - Total: 2,619 (LGA 2021)
- Website: Barunga West Council
LGAs around Barunga West Council
Spencer Gulf	Port Pirie Regional Council	Port Pirie Regional Council
	Barunga West Council	Wakefield Regional Council
Copper Coast Council	Yorke Peninsula Council	Wakefield Regional Council

The Barunga West Council is a local government area in the Yorke and Mid North region of South Australia. The council seat is at Port Broughton, with a sub-office at Bute.

== Description ==
The council takes its name from the Barunga Range in the eastern part of the council area. The council covers an area in the Mid North and bordering the top of the Yorke Peninsula which includes the towns and localities of Alford, Bute, Clements Gap, Fisherman Bay, Kulpara, Melton, Ninnes, Port Broughton, Thomas Plain, Wokurna and Ward Hill, and parts of Mundoora, Paskeville, South Hummocks, Tickera and Willamulka. The main industries are tourism and growing grain.

== History ==
It was formed in 1997 from the amalgamation of the District Council of Bute and the District Council of Port Broughton. The council boundaries closely follow the boundaries of the six cadastral hundreds of the County of Daly which formed the original local governing bodies in the area in the late 1800s, namely the hundreds of Mundoora and Wokurna (District Council of Mundoora), and the hundreds of Ninnes, Wiltunga, Tickera and Kulpara (District Council of Ninnes).

== Council ==
=== Current composition ===
Party	Councillors
Labor	1
Independents	8
Total	9

Ward	Councillor	Notes
Unsubdivided
Unsubdivided	Leonie Kerley	Mayor
Unsubdivided	Cynthia Axford	
Unsubdivided	Kevin Beinke	
Unsubdivided	Peter Button	Deputy Mayor
Unsubdivided	Dave Eason	
Unsubdivided	Kim Gregory	
Unsubdivided	Brian Lockyer	
Unsubdivided	Margaret McDonald	
Unsubdivided	Grant Rowlands	

=== 2022 election results ===
2022 South Australian local elections: Barunga West
Party	Candidate	Votes	%	±%
Independent	Peter Button (elected)	265	25.2	
Independent	Cynthia Axford (elected)	247	23.5	
Independent	Leonie Kerley (elected)	161	15.3	
Independent Labor	Kim Gregory (elected)	122	11.6	
Independent	Kevin John Beinke (elected)	67	6.4	
Independent	Grant Rowlands (elected)	56	5.3	
Independent	Brian John Lockyer (elected)	53	5.0	
Independent	Dave Eason (elected)	35	3.3	
Independent	Margaret McDonald (elected)	21	2.0	
Independent	Georgie Simmons	17	1.6	
Independent	Rob Locke	9	0.9	
Total formal votes		1,053	96.9	
Informal votes		34	3.1	
Turnout		1,087	52.6	

=== Mayors ===
- unknown (1997-????)
- Dean Dolling (2011-2013?)
- Cynthia Axford (2014–2018)
