= District Council of Redhill =

Former local government area of South Australia

Coordinates: 33°35′0″S 137°56′8″E

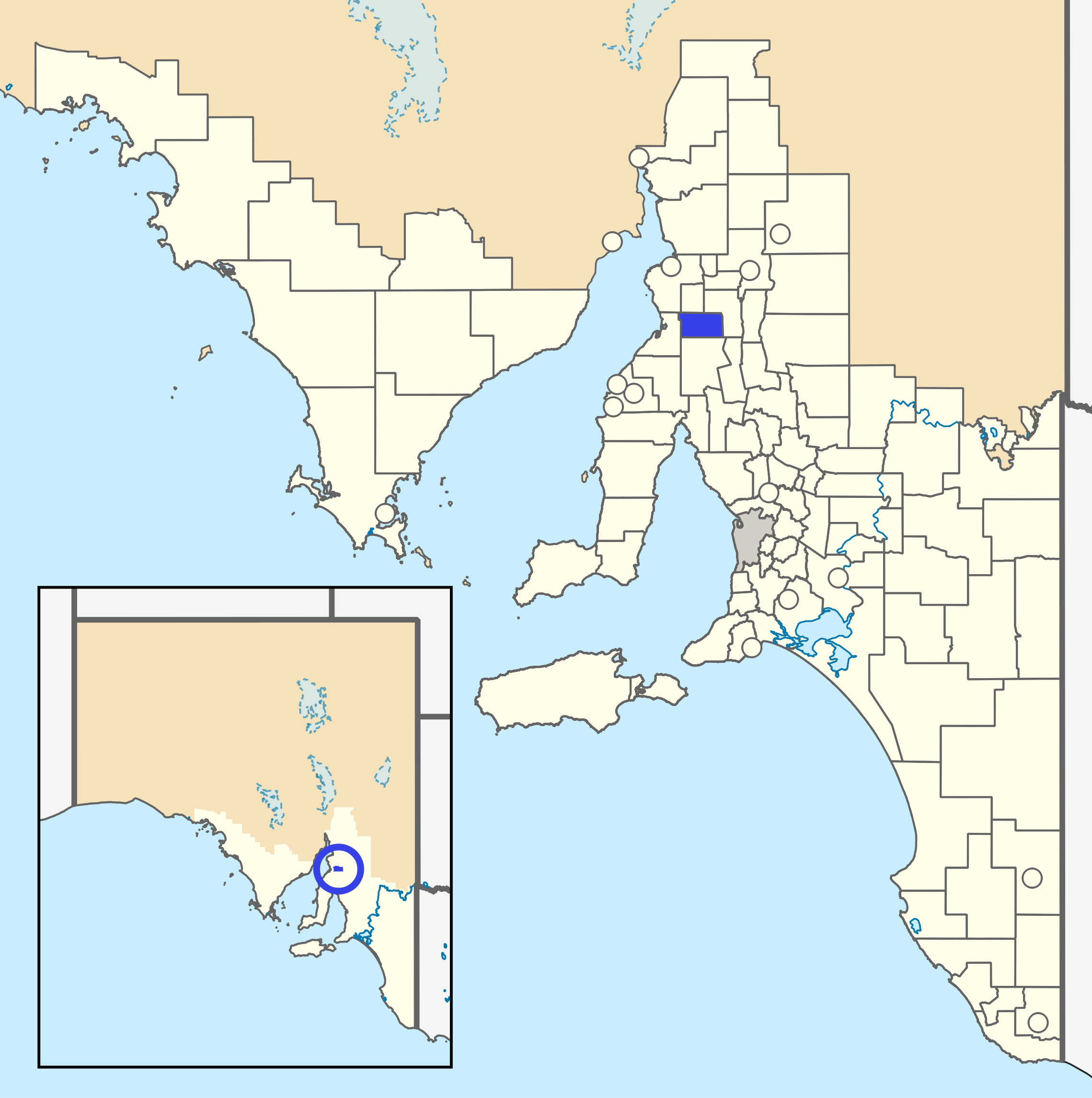
The District Council of Redhill as it was prior to disestablishment (blue)

The District Council of Redhill was a local government area in South Australia from 1888 to 1988.

It was proclaimed on 5 January 1888 as one of the new councils created under the District Councils Act 1887 under the name of the District Council of Broughton. At its creation, it included the Hundreds of Mundoora, Redhill, Koolunga, and Wokurna. Meetings were initially held at Redhill, but were moved to Port Broughton after complaints from the councillor for Wokurna Ward about the distance over rough roads to attend meetings. On 9 June 1892, the District Council of Mundoora was created, severing the Hundred of Wokurna from the existing council and gaining "all that portion of the Hundred of Mundoora not included in the District of Broughton". As a result, the District Council of Broughton was resubdivided into three wards (Broughton Extension, Koolunga and Redhill), electing only five councillors instead of the initial eight.

The council changed its name from the District Council of Broughton to the District Council of Red Hill on 30 May 1912, and this was subsequently contracted to the current name of Redhill. (The Mundoora council would subsequently rename itself the District Council of Port Broughton on 31 May 1917.) A council chamber was also established at Redhill. In 1936, the District Council of Redhill controlled an area of 122,240 acres of what was described as "a very prosperous farming district". In that year, it had a population of 1,037, with 300 ratepayers. It ceased to exist on 1 July 1988, when it merged with the District Council of Crystal Brook to create the District Council of Crystal Brook-Redhill.

== Neighbouring local government ==
The following adjacent local government bodies co-existed with the Redhill council:

- District Council of Crystal Brook lay north west until the Hundred of Wandearah was annexed by the District Council of Pirie in 1892, after which time the latter council became the north west neighbour to Redhill council.
- The District Council of Crystal Brook lay immediately north until it was amalgamated with Redhill council in 1988.
- District Council of Georgetown (established 1876) lay immediately east and north east.
- District Council of Hutt and Hill Rivers (established 1885) lay south east until 1935 when the Hundred of Hart was annexed by the District Council of Blyth, after which time the latter council became the south east neighbour to Redhill council.
- District Council of Snowtown lay immediately south.
- District Council of Ninnes (established 1885) lay south west until the new Mundoora council was established in 1892.
- District Council of Port Broughton (earlier called District Council of Mundoora) lay immediately west and south west from 1892, when it was severed from Redhill (then called Broughton) council.

== Chairmen ==
- W. J. George (1891)
- R. Harris (1903)
- L. R. Wake (1906)
- James Pilkington (1912)
- T. Freeman (1913)
- P. H. Wheaton (1919)
- Herbert Arthur Spencer (1930-1948)
- Aloysius Paul Kirchner (1948)
- Innes Leith Jones (1948-1953)
- Clarence Gordon Burford (1953-1962)
- Walter Sydney Mumford (1962-1963)
- Clarence Ray Button (1963-1966)
- Leo Stanley Hayes (1966-1971)
- Glen Barry Jones (1971)
- Leo Stanley Hayes (1971-1972)
- Lyall Roy Stringer (1972-1974)
- Eric John Wyatt (1974-1976)
- Peter Harvey Longmire (1976-1980)
