= Port Broughton railway line =

Railway line in South Australia

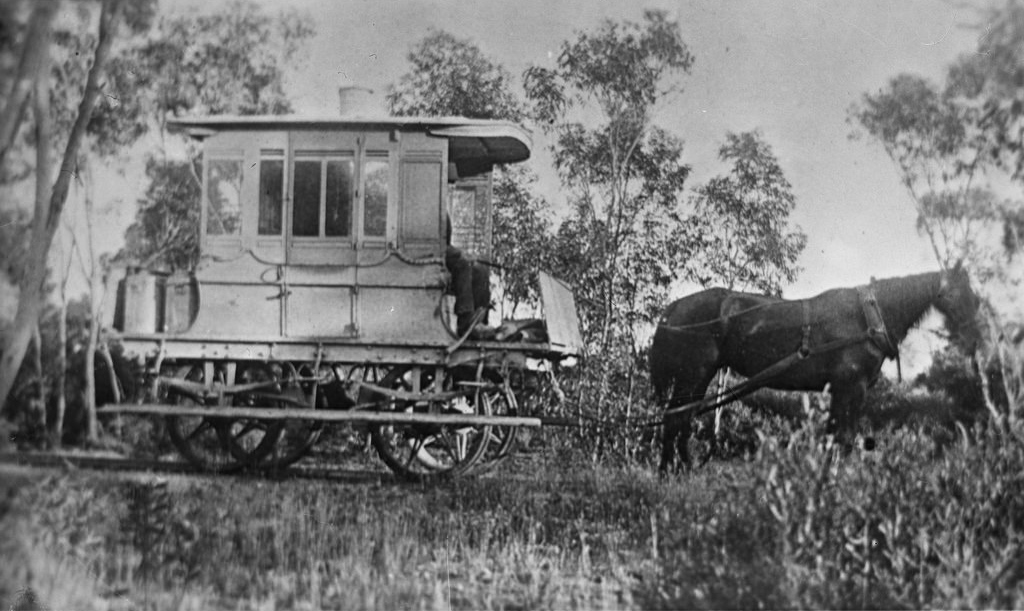
- Passenger carriage on the Port Broughton tramway

Overview
- Status: Closed and removed
- Locale: Mid North, South Australia
- Termini: Mundoora; Port Broughton

History
- Commenced: 11 March 1876
- Passenger service ended: 17 September 1925
- Closed: 3 August 1942

Technical
- Line length: 10 mi (16 km)
- Track length: 10 mi (16 km)
- Track gauge: 3 ft 6 in (1,067 mm)

Port Broughton railway line was an isolated 3 ft 6 in (1,067 mm) narrow gauge railway line serving Port Broughton on Spencer Gulf in South Australia. It opened in 1876 and closed in 1942.

The railway was built to service the port of Port Broughton, and opened on 11 March 1876. It delivered grain from Mundoora, 16 kilometres (10 mi) inland and uphill. Horses were used to tow the empty wagons uphill, but they were sent downhill powered by gravity, with a driver to operate the brakes. The passenger service ceased on 17 September 1925. The use of the line for grain traffic continued until 1942.

In 1906, Clarence Goode, a member for Stanley in the House of Assembly, proposed the use of steam or petrol-powered locomotives on the line.

During January 1926, a Fordson rail tractor displaced the animal power. From 1931, the railways contracted out the service to a private operator. The railway ceased to be used on 3 August 1942, but the tractor continued to shunt wheat wagons between the station yard and the jetty at Port Broughton until 1949.

There was a proposal to convert the line into a railway to connect at Brinkworth but it was never built.
