= District Council of Bute =

- Local government area
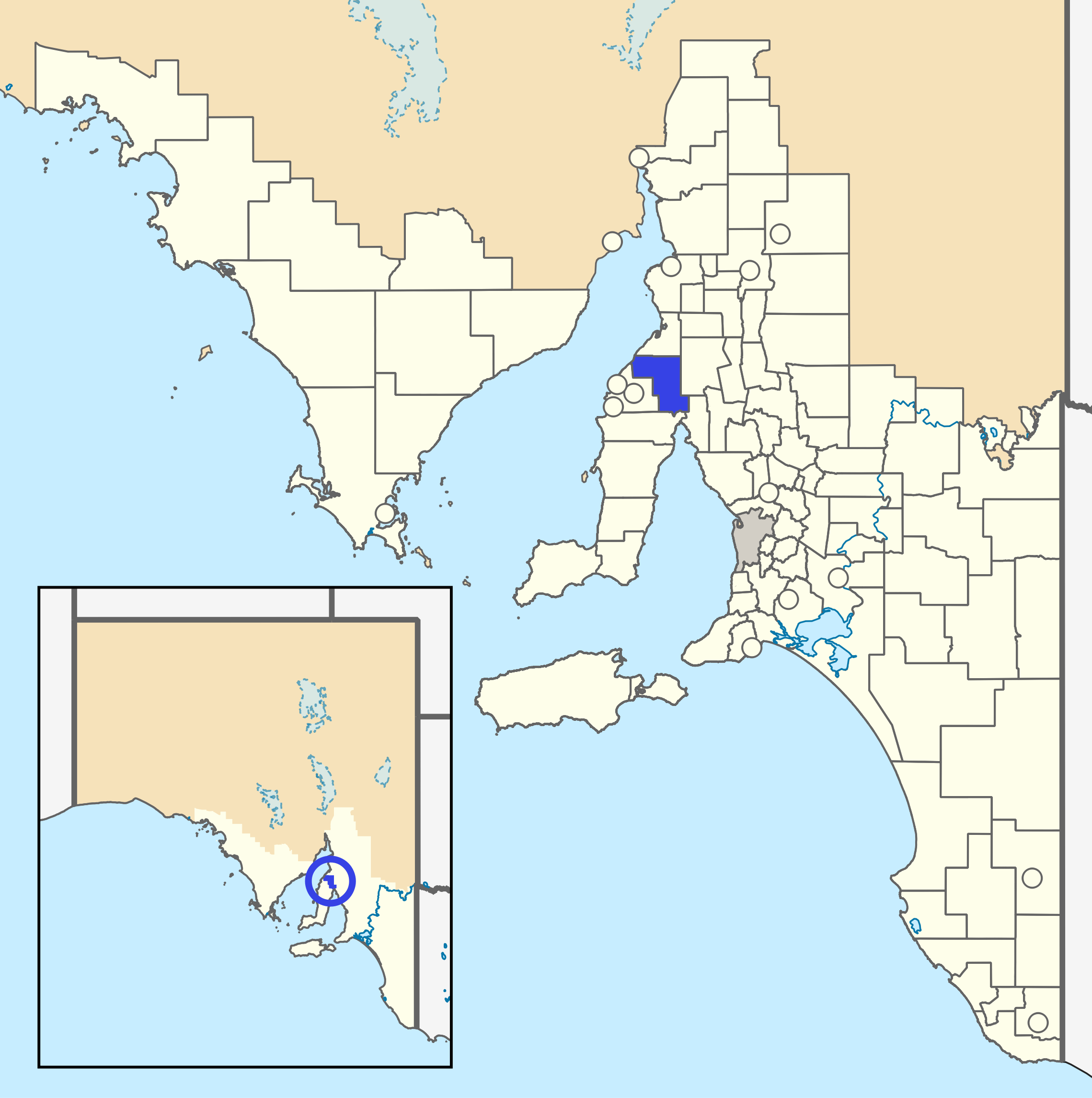
- The District Council of Bute as it was prior to disestablishment (blue)
- Coordinates: 33°51′0″S 138°00′0″E
- Country: Australia
- State: South Australia
- Established: 1885
- Abolished: 1997
- Council seat: Bute
LGAs around District Council of Bute
	Broughton/ Redhill (1888-1892); Mundoora/ Port Broughton (1892-1997)	Snowtown (1890-1987); Blyth-Snowtown (1987-1996)
Kadina (1888-1984); Northern Yorke Peninsula (1984-1997)	District Council of Bute	Snowtown (1890-1987); Blyth-Snowtown; Port Wakefield (1888-1890)
Green's Plains (1885-1888); Clinton (1932-1987); Central Yorke Peninsula (1987-1997)	Kulpara (1885-1932); Clinton (1932-1987); Central Yorke Peninsula (1987-1997)	Kulpara (1885-1932); Port Wakefield (1932-1983); Wakefield Plains (1983-1997)

The District Council of Bute was a local government area in South Australia from 1885 to 1997.

== History ==
It was proclaimed on 16 July 1885 as the District Council of Ninnes, and initially only included the Hundred of Ninnes. It held its first meeting in the home of a councillor, but subsequently adapted a former accommodation house for travellers at Ninnes as a council chamber. It was expanded significantly by the District Councils Act 1887, which added the Hundreds of Wiltunga and Tickera, and with them, the towns of Alford, Bute and Tickera. It was subsequently divided into three wards, one for each cadastral hundred.

The Ninnes council chamber became increasingly dilapidated with time, and it was later decided to build a new district office and hall at Bute, reflecting the rapid growth of that town. It underwent a further boundary change on 12 May 1932, when it gained most of the abolished District Council of Kulpara, except a portion of its Paskeville Ward, while losing portions of Tickera Ward to both the District Council of Kadina and the District Council of Port Broughton. It was renamed the District Council of Bute on 5 January 1933. It subsequently switched to a five-ward system (Bute, Kulpara, Ninnes, Tickera and Wiltunga).

In 1936, it covered an area of 387 square miles, with a population of 1,920. In that year, it was described as a "prosperous mixed farming district" that "with an assured rainfall, having never had a crop failure". The main industries were reported to be wheat and barley growing. It was also noted for its steadfast protection of its timber reserves, especially alongside roads, in comparison to other councils. It ceased to exist in 1997 when it merged with the District Council of Port Broughton to form the District Council of Barunga West.

== Neighbouring local government ==
The following adjacent local government bodies co-existed with the Ninnes/Bute council:

- District Council of Broughton (later called District Council of Redhill) lay north from its establishment in 1888. In 1892 it was split in two and the new District Council of Mundoora (later called District Council of Port Broughton) became the second northern neighbour to Ninnes council.
- District Council of Port Wakefield (established 1878) lay north east and east from 1888, when it annexed the Hundred of Cameron.
- District Council of Snowtown lay north east and east from 1890, when it annexed the Hundred of Cameron from Port Wakefield council and Ninnes council's own boundaries expanded north to encompass the Hundred of Wiltunga.
- District Council of Kulpara (established 1878) lay south east and south until it was mostly absorbed by Ninnes council in 1932, making the District Council of Port Wakefield the south eastern neighbour. In 1983 Port Wakefield council was amalgamated with two other councils to its east, making the new District Council of Wakefield Plains the south eastern neighbour to Bute council.
- District Council of Clinton (established 1878) lay south and south west from 1932, when most of Kulpara council was absorbed by Ninnes council.
- District Council of Green's Plains (established 1871) lay south west until 1888, when it was abolished and incorporated into the new Kadina council.
- District Council of Kadina lay west from its establishment in 1888. In 1984 it amalgamated with the Corporate Town of Moonta to form the new District Council of Northern Yorke Peninsula, after which time the latter was Bute council's western neighbour.

== Chairmen ==
- H. D. O'Halloran (1885)
- G. F. Mills (1886)
- R. A. Heath (1892)
- W. H. B. Paterson (1896)
- J. Watson (1899)
- A. D. McDonald (1907)
- W. H. Sharman (1922–1929)
- William Nathaniel Trengove (1929–1938)
- Ernest William Bettess (1938–1946)
- Claude Eric Rundle (1946–1948)
- Roy Johns Hall (1948–1951)
- Malcolm Paterson McPherson (1951–1955)
- Bruce Penna (1955–1958)
- John Clifford Copley (1958–1962)
- Harold Bettess (1963–1964)
- Dudley Cardell Bruce (1964–1967)
- Lionel Ray Daniel (1967–1978)
- Graham Frank Taylor (1978–1983)
- Neil Turner Paterson (1983–1985)
- James Harold Bettess (1985-1987)
- Nevin Dean Newbold (1987 - 1993)
- David J Harries (1993 - 1997)
