= Fisherman Bay =

Fisherman Bay may refer to:

- Fisherman Bay, South Australia
- Lopez Island
