= Shag Island (South Australia) =

Island in South Australia

Coordinates: 33°33′30″S 137°55′09″E

Geography
- Location: Spencer Gulf

Administration
- Australia

Shag Island is a low island located at the mouth of Fisherman Bay in Spencer Gulf, South Australia. It is approximately 22 ha (54 acres) in size with a peak elevation of approximately 4 metres (13 feet). It is uninhabited by humans but is home to thousands of cormorants which roost and breed there. It is also an important nursery-ground for fish. In April 2013, the discovery of several sick and dead cormorants near Fisherman Bay raised public concerns for the health of the Shag Island colony. The discovery coincided with significant fish and dolphin mortality events around the state, mostly concentrated in Spencer Gulf and Gulf St. Vincent.

== Wildlife ==
The following birds have been recorded at Shag Island: great cormorant, little black cormorant, pied cormorant, little pied cormorant, red-necked stint, sharp-tailed sandpiper, red-capped plover, banded stilt, bar-tailed godwit, grey plover, common greenshank and masked lapwing.
