= Bute, South Australia =

Bute South Australia
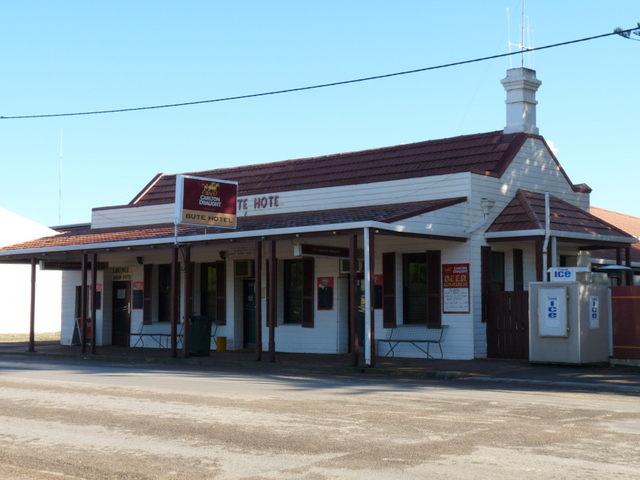
- Bute Hotel

- Coordinates: 33°51′0″S 138°00′0″E
- Population: 228 (UCL 2021)
- Established: 13 March 1884
- Postcode(s): 5560
- Location: 40 km (25 mi) east of Wallaroo; 24 km (15 mi) west of Snowtown; 142 km (88 mi) from Adelaide
- LGA(s): Barunga West
- State electorate(s): Narungga
- Federal division(s): Grey
Localities around Bute:
Port Broughton	Wokurna	Snowtown
Alford	Bute	Barunga Gap
Thomas Plain	Ninnes	Lochiel

Bute is a town in the Northern Yorke peninsula of South Australia, approximately 40 kilometres (25 mi) east of Wallaroo and 24 kilometres west of Snowtown. It was proclaimed as a town in 1884 and named after the Isle of Bute, in the Firth of Clyde, Scotland. It was the original site of the Yorke Peninsula Field Days in 1895; they are now held outside Paskeville.

== History ==
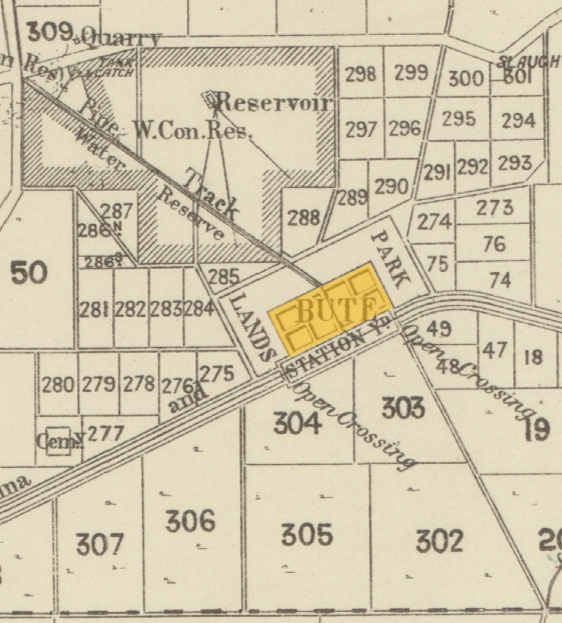
An excerpt of a 1905 plan of the Hundred of Wiltunga highlighting the Government Town of Bute just north of the hundred's southern border and the railway line

The cadastral Hundred of Wiltunga and Hundred of Ninnes were proclaimed in the County of Daly in 1874 to enable closer settlement of the area between the Barunga-Hummock Ranges and the coast-side copper-mining communities of Kadina, Wallaroo and Moonta. In 1882 land in the Hundred of Wiltunga was sold to pioneer grain-growing farmers for between £1 and £1/2/6 per acre. The Government Town of Bute was town surveyed near the southern boundary of the Hundred of Wiltunga in September 1883 and officially named by Governor William Robinson on 13 March 1884.

In 1888, the town of Bute and surrounding hundred of Wiltunga was annexed by the District Council of Ninnes, bringing local government administration to the township for the first time. In October 1879 the Brinkworth–Kadina railway line was opened with Bute being at the 18-mile (29 km) siding. The next siding towards Kadina on the railway was originally called "15-mile camp" or "16-mile Siding" and later Mona. While the railway was being constructed, some competition existed between Mona and Bute as to which rail-side settlement would become the prime business centre to serve residents, but by 1886 Bute was clearly dominant, being home to a church and school and having had a hotel license granted.

In addition to Mona, by the turn of the century, the suburbs of Bute East, Bute South and Bute West existed adjacent to Bute, outside the limits of the original government town. In 1933 the Ninnes council was renamed to the District Council of Bute given that, by then, the township of Bute had far outgrown Ninnes to the south.

From 1895 until about 1973, the Yorke Peninsula Field Day event was held at Bute. By 1935 a state-of-the-art aerodrome had been laid down immediately north of the town and become headquarters to the North-Western Aero Club.

From the late 1990s a tourist train traversed the by-then-disused railway line from Wallaroo to Bute, but this closed in 2009. In 1998 the boundaries of contemporary Bute were formalised. Bute East, Bute South, Bute West and Mona were all absorbed along with a huge swathe of surrounding farmland to form the new 238-square-kilometre (92 sq mi) bounded locality of Bute, which occupies approximately the south-eastern two thirds of the Hundred of Wiltunga.

== Attractions ==
Attractions to the town include the nearby Bute tannery, Bute Hobbies Bromeliad Display Gardens and the Bute Hotel. A free-to-view fauna park on the Snowtown Road is maintained by the Bute Lions Club. Visitors can view emus, peacocks, waterfowl, red kangaroos and other wildlife contained within fenced enclosures. The park also features barbecue facilities and picnic areas. The town is surrounded by agricultural and pastoral land.
