= Snowtown Wind Farm =

Wind farm in Snowtown, Australia

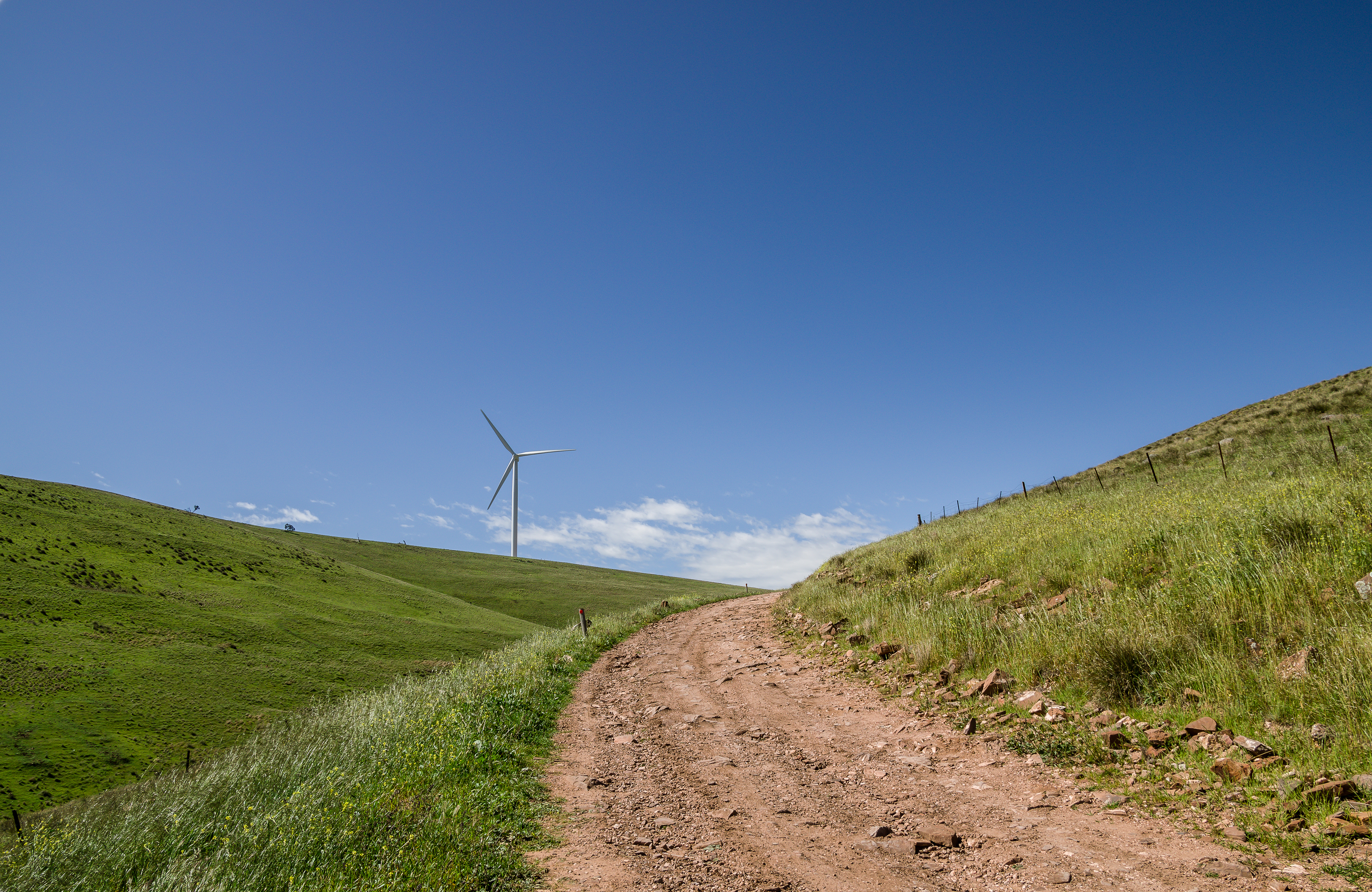
- Country: Australia
- Location: Barunga and Hummocks ranges west of Snowtown
- Coordinates: 33°49′48″S 138°7′7″E
- Status: Operational
- Construction began: 2007
- Commission date: 2008 (stage I); 2014 (stage II)
- Owners: Tilt Renewables, Palisade Investment Partners
- Operator: Tilt Renewables

Wind farm
- Type: onshore
- Hub height: 80 m (262 ft)
- Rotor diameter: 88 m (289 ft), 95 m (312 ft), 101 m (331 ft), 108 m (354 ft)
- Site area: 70.5 acres (29 ha)
- Site elevation: 300 to 430 m

Power generation
- Units operational: 48 x 2.1 MW; 90 x 3.0 MW
- Make and model: Suzlon Energy: 47 x S88_2.1MW; 1 x S95_2.1MW; Siemens: 80 x SWT-108-3.0MW; 10 x SWT-101-3.0MW
- Nameplate capacity: 370.8 MW

The Snowtown Wind Farm is a wind farm in South Australia. It is located on the Barunga and Hummocks Ranges west of Snowtown in the Mid North of South Australia, around 150 kilometres (93 mi) north of the state capital, Adelaide. They were developed by Trustpower and owned by Tilt Renewables, which demerged from Trustpower in 2016. The first stage of 47 turbines was completed in 2008 and Stage 2 of 90 turbines became operational in 2014. Stage 2 was sold by Tilt Renewables to Palisade Investment Partners in December 2019.

== History ==
Trustpower began investigating the site in 2002 and started construction of Stage 1 in 2006. Stage 1 was commissioned in 2008 with one additional turbine added in 2011. The first power generated by the wind turbines was received into the public grid in December 2007. The first stage of the wind farm, constructed by Suzlon Energy Australia, was substantially completed by October 2008 and was officially opened on 2 November 2008.

The second stage of 90 Siemens 3.0MW turbines was completed in June 2014 and officially opened in November 2014. It has a long-term power purchase contract with Origin Energy and was sold to Palisade Investment Partners in December 2019 for A$1.07 billion. Tilt retained ownership of Stage 1, which does not have a power purchase agreement.

== Site ==
The location of the wind farm, the Barunga Range, is a north–south trending ridge of the northern Mount Lofty Ranges. It is generally treeless, rounded, and lies across the direction of the prevailing westerly winds.

The Snowtown Wind Farm operates as three separate connections to the National Electricity Market. Stage 1 is a single line of turbines on the western side of the combined farm. Stage 2 has a southern section which mostly extends the line to the south, and a northern part which is adjacent on the east side of Stage 1.

== See also ==
- Wind power in South Australia
