= Ward Hill, South Australia =

Ward Hill South Australia
- Coordinates: 33.684640°S 137.847060°E
- Population: 52 (SAL 2016)
- Established: 1998
- Postcode(s): 5522
- Time zone: ACST (UTC+9:30)
  - Summer (DST): ACST (UTC+10:30)
- Location: 157 km (98 mi) north-west of Adelaide city centre
- LGA(s): District Council of Barunga West
- State electorate(s): Narungga
- Federal division(s): Grey
| Mean max temp | Mean min temp | Annual rainfall |
| 23.8 °C; 75 °F | 9.8 °C; 50 °F | 330.1 mm 13 in |
Suburbs around Ward Hill:
| Spencer Gulf | Spencer Gulf | Spencer Gulf |
| Spencer Gulf | Ward Hill | Port Broughton |
| Tickera | Alford | Alford |
- Footnotes: Distances; Coordinates; Climate; Adjoining localities

Ward Hill is a locality in the Australian state of South Australia located on the west coast of Yorke Peninsula, adjoining Spencer Gulf, about 157 kilometres (98 miles) north-west of Adelaide city centre.

Its boundaries were created in October 1998 for the "long established name" and included the Webling Bay Shack Area. The name was derived from the hill now located within the locality. Its coastline with Spencer Gulf includes at its northern end, an inlet known as Mundoora Arm and a channel known as Hamilton Lagoons.

As of 2015, land within the locality was zoned for agriculture, while a strip of land along its coastline was zoned for conservation.

Ward Hill is located within the federal division of Grey, the state electoral district of Narungga, and the local government area of the District Council of Barunga West.
