= Snowtown, South Australia =

Snowtown
- Town
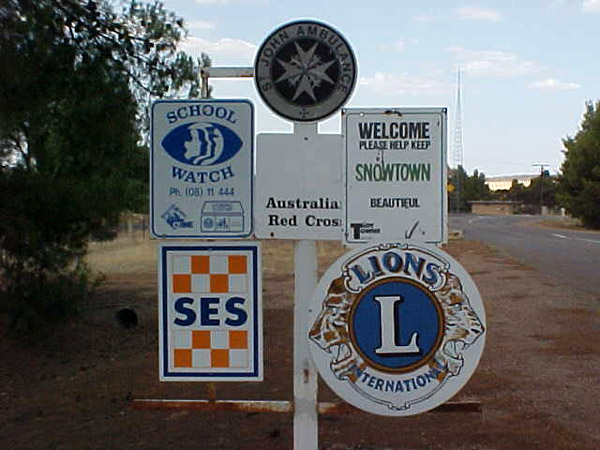
- South-western entrance to Snowtown

- Coordinates: 33°47′0″S 138°12′0″E
- Country: Australia
- State: South Australia
- LGA: Wakefield Regional Council
- Location: 145 km (90 mi) north of Adelaide
- Established: 1878

Government
  - State electorate: Narungga
  - Federal division: Grey
- Elevation: 103 m (338 ft)

Population
  - Total: 356 (UCL 2021)
- Postcode: 5520
- County: Daly
- Mean max temp: 23.3 °C (73.9 °F)
- Mean min temp: 9.7 °C (49.5 °F)
- Annual rainfall: 407.4 mm (16.04 in)
Localities around Snowtown
Mundoora, Port Broughton	Hope Gap, Burnsfield, Lake View	Brinkworth
Wokurna	Snowtown	Condowie, Blyth
Barunga Gap, Bute	Lochiel, Bumbunga	Everard Central

Snowtown is a town in the Mid North of South Australia 145 km (90 miles) north of Adelaide and lies on the main road and rail routes between Adelaide and Perth – the Augusta Highway and Adelaide-Port Augusta railway line. The town's elevation is 103 metres (338 feet) and on average the town receives 389 mm of rainfall per annum.

== History ==
The settlement of Snowtown by non-Indigenous Australians initially grew up around a railway station on the Brinkworth-Wallaroo line. Located on what is traditionally the land of the Kaurna, an Aboriginal people, the first pioneers arrived sometime between 1845 and 1869 due to the rapid expansion of grazing, then farming to the north of the area. Baillière's South Australian gazetteer and road guide, published in 1866, contains a brief description of "Hummock's Run" located 28 miles (45 km) north of Port Wakefield. This farmland, according to the publication, contained the farming stations of Barunga, Bumbunga and Wokurna and consisted of "salt lakes and lagoons, dense scrub, with mallee, pine and bushes, grassy plains and saltbush, well grassed spurs and hills, with oaks and wattle on the Broughton River."

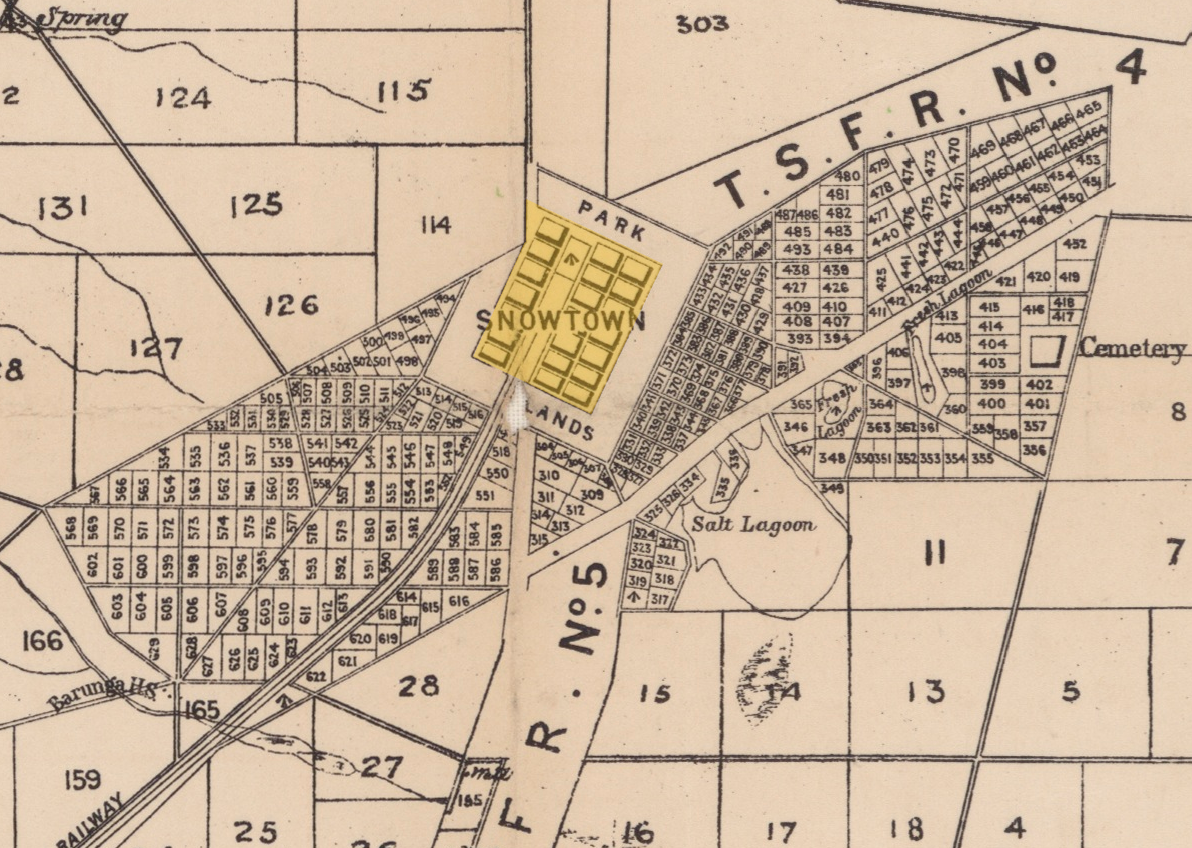
Town boundaries as shown on an 1880 map of the Hundred of Barunga

The hill to the east of Snowtown, Black Point Hill (and the nearby Black Point Lagoon) gave its name "Black Point" to the area by 1856 before Snowtown was established in 1878. This permanent waterhole and scrub-covered hill were then known as territory occupied by aboriginals, but claimed by Paddy Gleeson, founder of Clare as his 'Black Point Run'.

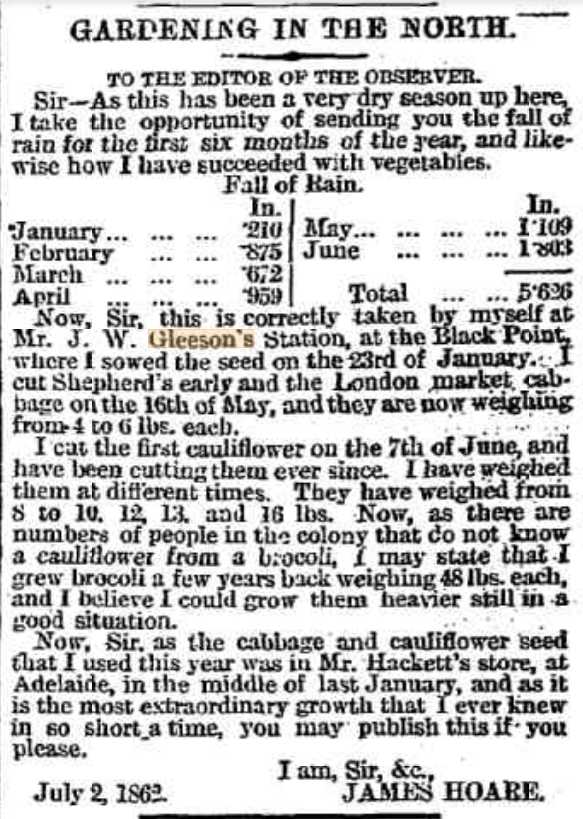
Letter by early colonist James Hoare about very successful gardening at Black Point S.A.

From 1862, and 1863 and well before 1870 settlers and graziers campaigned for better transport routes from Black Point to Kadina for easier freight transport of wheat and wool. By 1867 a Parliamentary Enquiry produced a Report recommending the Clare to Wallaroo railway be built for a cost of £144.15s. Only with the arrival in 1870 of Robert Barr Smith at the Hummocks Run, did the surveyors immediately arrive in February 1870, and then, first a paved road (1874), and later a railway (1878) get built from Kadina to Barunga (now Barunga Gap), a location on the Western side of the Hummocks. On September 25, 1877, the Commissioner for Crown Lands agreed with a local delegation that a township should be established at Black Point, and the railway was extended from Barunga Gap to Black Point.

The Government only started showing interest in the settlement as late as 1869 when it planned to establish various new towns throughout the district and to divide the land into much smaller holdings. Snowtown's charter as a government town was proclaimed on 19 December 1878 by Governor William Jervois. Jervois named the town after one of the members of the Snow family who were his cousins and lived on Yorke Peninsula (which lies immediately west and southwest of Snowtown). It is officially considered that the town was named after Thomas Snow, who became Jervois's aide de camp when he received his posting in South Australia. The town boundaries were defined as an approximate rectangle immediately adjacent to section 114 in the Hundred of Barunga north east of Barunga Creek, north west of Salt Lagoon and south of Boundary Creek. During this period one of the first major structures, the old Snowtown Pub was built in 1879 by Mr. Richard Hazelgrove, who paid £171 for block 160 on which he built the hotel. In 1879 the Snowtown school was also established on Glen Davidson Drive and the Kadina railway line was opened to Snowtown in October of that year. The extension to Brinkworth would be completed in 1894.

In 1888 the District Council of Snowtown was established by proclamation of the District Councils Act 1887, along with 20 other new local government bodies in South Australia. The new council incorporated the entirety of the hundreds of Barunga and Boucaut.

In 1923 the Long Plains railway line extension reached Snowtown and, in 1925, was completed to Redhill, bringing an increase of rail traffic to the town.

St Canice's Catholic Church was built in 1936 to designs by Adelaide architects Herbert Jory and Stanley Pointer in Romanesque Revival style.

Salt Lake school once existed at the southern extremity of the locality about 2.4 kilometres (1.5 mi) east of Augusta Highway.

During the 1970s and 1980s, the secessionist micronation of Bumbunga Province existed on farmland owned by the Brackstone family at Bumbunga, 15 kilometres (9.3 mi) south of Snowtown.

=== "Snowtown" murders ===
In 1999, Snowtown became known as the location where the remains of eight bodies were found in barrels of acid stored in a disused bank vault. The "Snowtown murders" or "bodies in barrels murders", as they came to be known, occurred in several locations in South Australia between August 1992 and May 1999. The bodies were held at a series of locations around Adelaide for some time, and were moved to Snowtown in early 1999, a few months before their discovery.

Only one victim was actually killed in Snowtown, and none of the victims or the perpetrators were local to the town. Most of the murders had actually been committed in the outer northern suburbs of Adelaide, located on the outskirts of the South Australian capital.

Four people, including ringleader John Justin Bunting, were convicted of murder or assisting the murders. Snowtown, a film about the murders and the life of Bunting, was released in 2011.

== Geography and climate ==
Snowtown is situated approximately 7 kilometres east of Barunga Gap, a cleft between the Barunga and Hummocks ranges. The excess rainfall from these hills collects in Lake Bumbunga, directly south of the township, and in a trail of smaller lakes stretching north of the town to Lake View near the main highway and railway line. Beyond the eastern edge of the township is the Snowtown Golf Course and a swampy region populated by saltbush and other salt-tolerant flora.

Snowtown has a warm Mediterranean climate with average summer temperatures around 30 °C and winter temperatures around 16 °C. The average annual rainfall is 407.4 millimetres (16.04 in), most of which falls in the winter months.

Climate data for Snowtown
Month	Jan	Feb	Mar	Apr	May	Jun	Jul	Aug	Sep	Oct	Nov	Dec	Year
Record high °C (°F)	46.3 (115.3)	44.8 (112.6)	43.0 (109.4)	39.6 (103.3)	31.7 (89.1)	26.7 (80.1)	27.7 (81.9)	30.3 (86.5)	34.4 (93.9)	40.0 (104.0)	43.9 (111.0)	45.0 (113.0)	46.3 (115.3)
Mean daily maximum °C (°F)	31.1 (88.0)	30.8 (87.4)	28.2 (82.8)	23.6 (74.5)	19.4 (66.9)	16.2 (61.2)	15.4 (59.7)	16.7 (62.1)	19.7 (67.5)	23.2 (73.8)	26.7 (80.1)	29.2 (84.6)	23.3 (73.9)
Mean daily minimum °C (°F)	14.6 (58.3)	14.7 (58.5)	12.7 (54.9)	9.9 (49.8)	7.8 (46.0)	6.0 (42.8)	5.2 (41.4)	5.6 (42.1)	6.7 (44.1)	8.6 (47.5)	11.1 (52.0)	13.2 (55.8)	9.7 (49.5)
Record low °C (°F)	3.8 (38.8)	2.8 (37.0)	0.0 (32.0)	−1.1 (30.0)	−2.0 (28.4)	−3.9 (25.0)	−4.4 (24.1)	−3.1 (26.4)	−2.2 (28.0)	−1.7 (28.9)	0.6 (33.1)	2.2 (36.0)	−4.4 (24.1)
Average rainfall mm (inches)	18.6 (0.73)	19.0 (0.75)	17.3 (0.68)	29.8 (1.17)	44.4 (1.75)	52.4 (2.06)	49.7 (1.96)	50.2 (1.98)	43.2 (1.70)	37.6 (1.48)	24.8 (0.98)	20.4 (0.80)	407.4 (16.04)
Average rainy days (≥ 0.2mm)	3.5	3.4	4.2	7.0	10.4	12.5	13.4	13.5	10.9	9.2	6.0	4.7	98.7
Source: Bureau of Meteorology

== Governance ==
The town administration now falls under the control of the Wakefield Regional Council for local governance. This body came into effect on 1 July 1997 as a result of the amalgamation of the former councils of Blyth-Snowtown and Wakefield Plains.

Snowtown lies in the state electoral district of Narungga and in the federal electoral division of Grey.

== Media ==
Snowtown was home to a weekly newspaper called the Broughton Star (5 March 1909 – 5 July 1912) which was founded by James Barclay. The newspaper was "continued" by Barclay, although it was in fact absorbed by another of his publications, the Stanley Herald (a reference to the electorate of Stanley), which he had also started in March 1909. The merged newspaper ran until 26 June 1941, at which point publication stopped due to wartime restrictions. Publication of the Herald resumed on 11 December 1947 for a little over a year at which point post-war labour shortages halted production on 16 December 1948.

Since 2002, the Snowtown Community Management Committee has published a monthly newsletter called Snowtown's View. The publication is edited by a committee of community volunteers.

== Economy ==
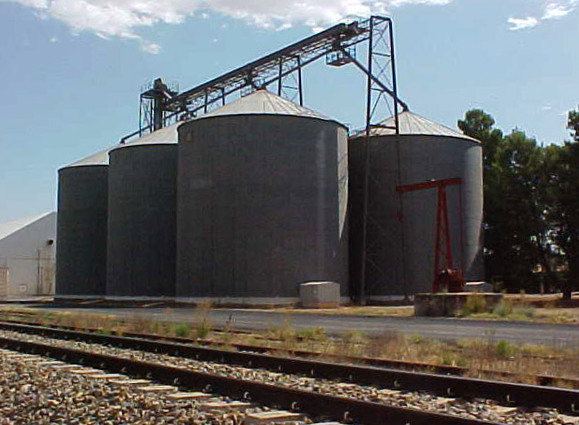
Grain silos on western side of railway tracks, Snowtown

Located in what is described as a wheat-belt, the local Snowtown economy is predominantly based on cereal crops. Other primary industries include woolgrowing, livestock production and salt mining (at the nearby Lake Bumbunga saltworks).

Snowtown is a service centre for the local area, providing various essential services for the district as well as for motorists on the Augusta Highway, the section of Highway 1 past the town.

In 2008, TrustPower completed the first stage of the 47-turbine Snowtown Wind Farm in the Barunga and Hummocks ranges just west of Snowtown. The wind turbines are 110 metres from the ground to tip of the top wing. Snowtown Wind Farm 2 is one of the most modern wind farms in Australia. This wind farm produces enough electricity for 180,000 South Australian homes; the 270MW Snowtown 2 Wind Farm was commissioned in October 2014, producing an average of 875GWh of electricity per year.

== Built environs ==
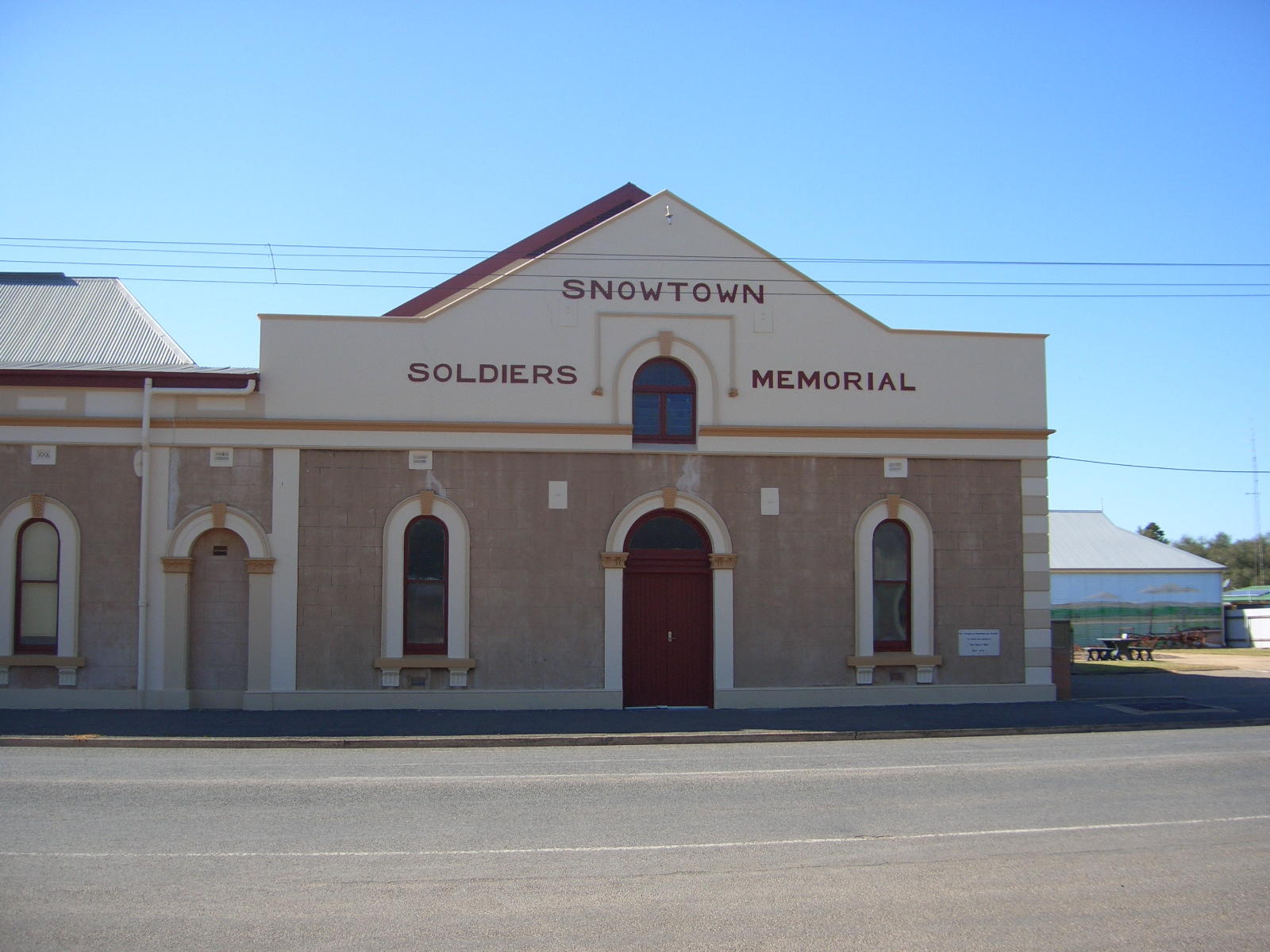
Snowtown Soldiers Memorial Hall

The town's main street, Fourth Street contains most of the town's civic buildings, notably the Snowtown Memorial Hall (built 1919) which is attached to the Old Institute (built 1885). Nearby is the town's tribute to the original pioneers. The town's population is 467.

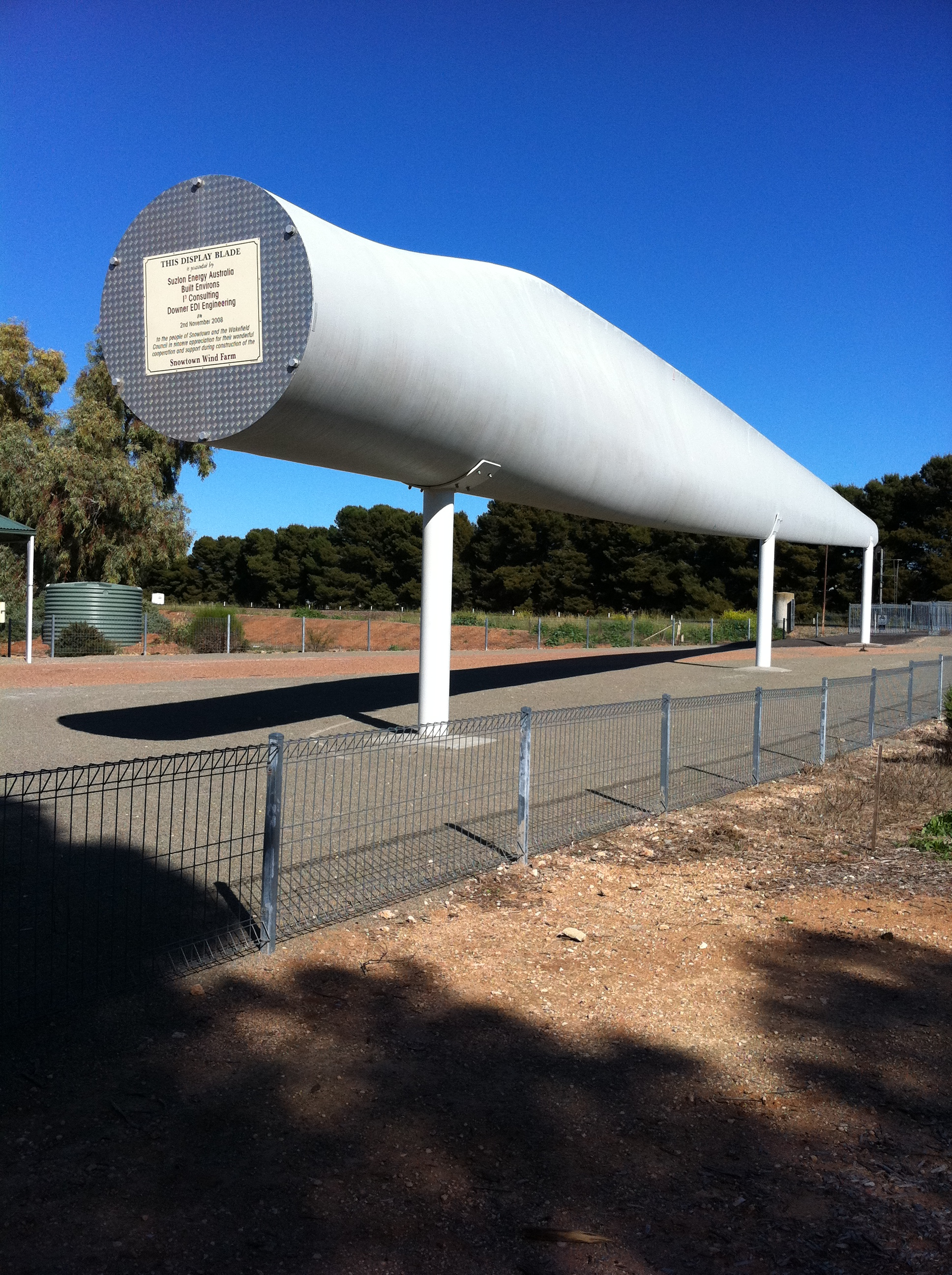
Big blade, Snowtown

In 2008, a monument in the form of a 44-metre wind turbine blade was installed at the intersection of Fourth Street and Railway Terrace East.

=== Transport ===
The main north–south road running just outside the western edge of the town was designated to form part of Australia's Highway 1 in 1955. The section passing Snowtown (from Port Wakefield to Port Augusta) was named Augusta Highway in 2011.

The Snowtown-Kadina railway line opened in 1879. It connected Snowtown via Bute to the port of Wallaroo, initially built as narrow gauge. This line was converted to broad gauge in 1927, but closed following the gauge standardisation of the Adelaide-Crystal Brook line in 1982. The Snowtown-Brinkworth railway line was opened on 30 March 1894 with a siding halfway between, named Condowie. The full Kadina-Brinkworth railway line opened for traffic on 2 July 1894. The Snowtown to Brinkworth section closed on 20 February 1990 followed by the rest of the line on 3 March 1993.

The main rail line from Salisbury has intersected the town along a north–south axis since 1923. Snowtown was linked by direct rail to Adelaide when the line from Bumbunga siding was opened on 2 September 1923. The line was extended north to Redhill later in that year. From then until 1982 the line was known as the Port Pirie line as there was a break of gauge from broad gauge to standard gauge at that terminus. The Adelaide-Port Augusta railway line through Snowtown was converted to standard gauge in 1982.

=== School ===
In 1879 Mrs Lamb opened a Provisional School in Snowtown with a total enrolment of 14 pupils. During its lifetime agricultural science has been a particular focus for the school.

In 1961 the school became an area school known as Snowtown Area School and was located on 4.5 hectares (11 acres) of land, with an additional 10 hectares (25 acres) of land used for agricultural studies.

In the 1970s and 1980s, the school's respected agricultural credentials drew students from neighbouring communities. The school provided many entries into Royal Adelaide Show livestock and horticulture competitions, especially the sheep and beef cattle categories. In the early 1980s the school became a poll dorset sheep stud called 'SASdor' for several years.

Pupil enrolments at Snowtown Area School in 2006 totalled 118, with many pupils also travelling from nearby Lochiel, Barunga Gap and Redhill. As of 2006 pupils were also able to study via distance education through the Open Access College at Marden (Adelaide) or via larger neighbouring schools to increase their range of subject choices.

By 2012, the fall in enrolments, and consequent drop in funding, led to the ceasing of senior enrolments at the commencement of the 2013 school year. The school was subsequently renamed to Snowtown Primary School.

In 2015, pupil enrolments at Snowtown Primary School totalled 52.

== Notable residents ==
- Australian cricketer Lauren Ebsary was born and schooled in Snowtown.

== See also ==
- Stanley Football Association
- Snowtown Museum
- List of cities and towns in South Australia
- Snowtown murders
