= District Council of Port Broughton =

Former local government of South Australia

Coordinates: 33°35′0″S 137°56′0″E

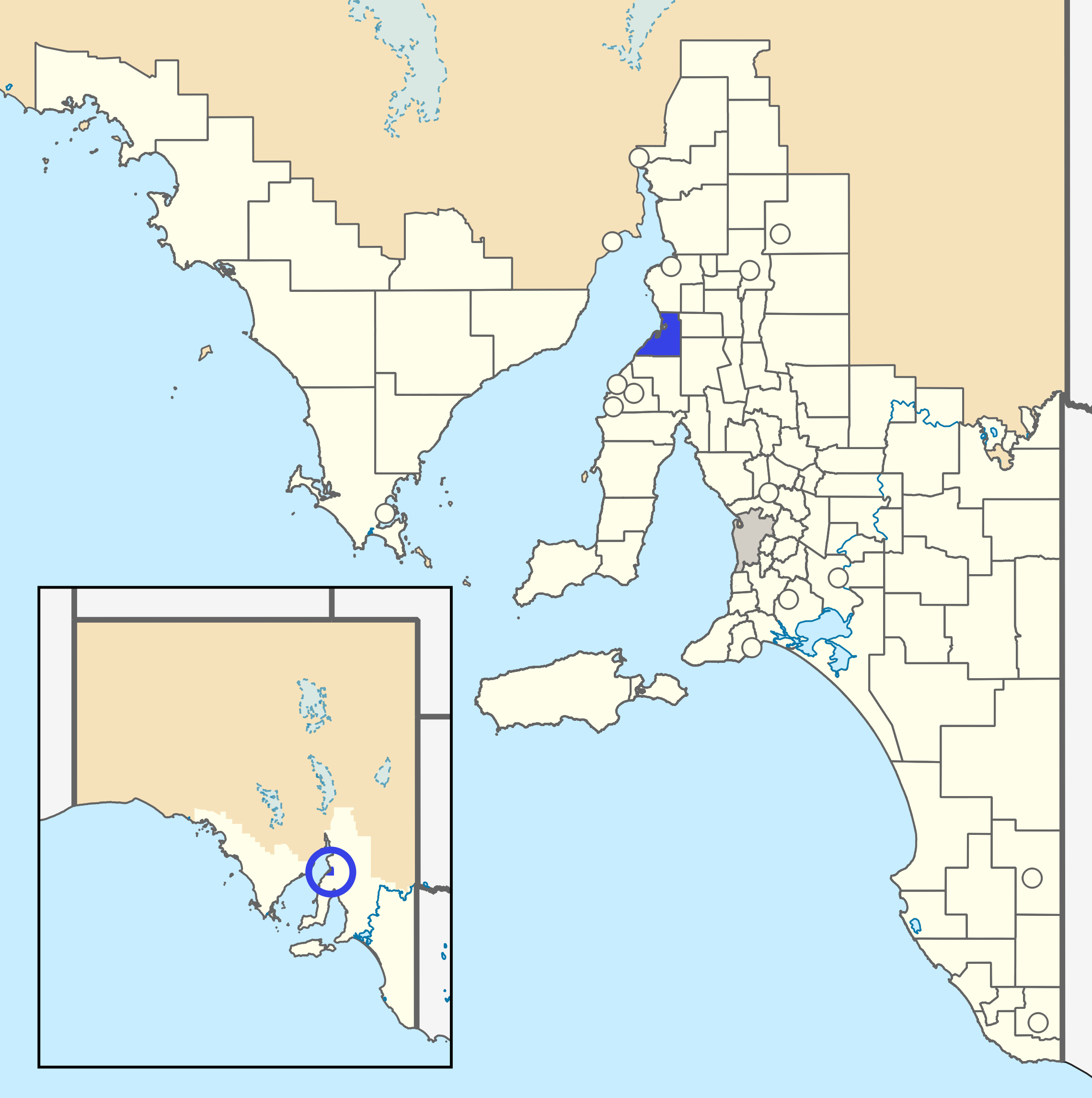
The District Council of Port Broughton as it was prior to disestablishment (blue)

The District Council of Port Broughton was a local government area in South Australia from 1892 to 1997 seated at the town of Port Broughton.

== History ==
It was proclaimed on 9 June 1892 as the District Council of Mundoora by the severance of the Hundred of Wokurna and a western portion of the Hundred of Mundoora from the District Council of Broughton (later the called District Council of Redhill). It was subdivided into two wards (Mundoora and Wokurna) at its creation. The proclamation followed some years of agitation from Port Broughton residents in favour of dividing the original Broughton council. A reserve for a district council chamber at Port Broughton was proclaimed in 1893.

The District Council of Mundoora renamed itself the District Council of Port Broughton on 31 May 1917. In 1933, a portion of the Hundred of Tickera was added to the existing Hundreds of Mundoora and Wokurna, and was added to the Wokurna Ward. In 1936, the council controlled an area of 250 square miles, with 1,340 residents, 280 of them in Port Broughton. The principal industry of the district was wheat growing, with tourism also important in the township itself.

It was abolished in 1997, when it merged with the District Council of Bute to form the District Council of Barunga West.

== Neighbouring local government ==
The following adjacent local government bodies co-existed with the Mundoora/Port Broughton council:

- District Council of Crystal Brook lay north until the Hundred of Wandearah was annexed by the District Council of Pirie in 1892, after which time the latter council became the northern neighbour to Mundoora council.
- The District Council of Crystal Brook lay north east until it was amalgamated with Redhill council in 1988. From that time the District Council of Crystal Brook-Redhill lay north east.
- District Council of Broughton (established 1876) lay immediately east, changing its name to District Council of Redhill in 1912, until 1988 when it was amalgamated with Crystal Brook council.
- District Council of Snowtown (established 1888) lay east and south east until 1988 when it was amalgamated into the District Council of Blyth-Snowtown, after which time the latter council became the south east neighbour to Port Broughton council.
- District Council of Ninnes (established 1885) lay immediately south and south west. From 1933, Ninnes council was known as the District Council of Bute and ultimately was amalgamated with Port Broughton council in 1997, forming the District Council of Barunga West.

== Chairmen ==
- T. Barker (1892)
- James Barclay (1896–1905)
- S. March (1908)
- H. Allchurch (1909–1910)
- James Barclay (1911)
- James Henry Fletcher (1928–1931)
- Walter Scott Murray (1940–1944)
- George Horace Routley (1931–1936)
- John Sansfield Casey (1936–1940)
- Joseph Steven James Stringer (1940–1942)
- George Edward Barnes (1942–1944)
- Joseph Steven James Stringer (1944–1945)
- James Henry Fletcher (1946–1949)
- Thomas Henry Ireland (1949–1950)
- John Sansfield Casey (1950–1954)
- Murvin Keith Duffield (1954–1963)
- Frederick William Schmitt (1963–1968)
- Kevin James Kerley (1970–1974)
- Ronald Frank Hewett (1974-?)
