= Barunga Gap, South Australia =

Barunga Gap South Australia
- Coordinates: 33.82647082°S 138.12410021°E
- Population: 23 (SAL 2021)
- Postcode(s): 5520
- LGA(s): Wakefield Regional Council
- Region: Mid North
- County: Daly
- State electorate(s): Narungga
- Federal division(s): Grey
Localities around Barunga Gap:
Wokurna	Wokurna	Snowtown
Bute	Barunga Gap	Snowtown
Bute; Ninnes	Lochiel	Bumbunga

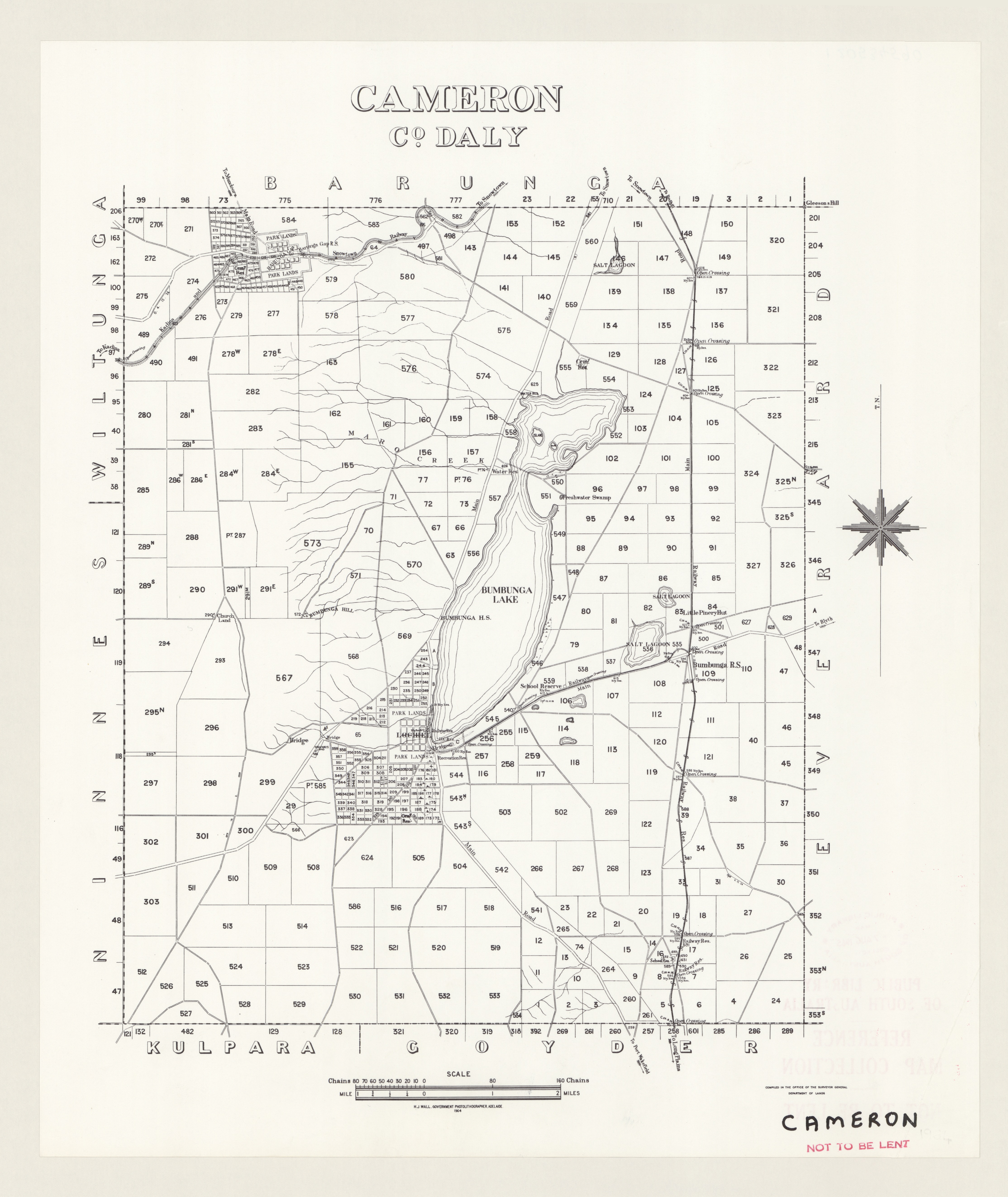
Plan of the Hundred of Cameron in 1964 showing the surveyed town of Barunga Gap at top left, later named Percyton

Barunga Gap is a locality in South Australia about 12 kilometres (7.5 mi) south west of Snowtown. Barunga Gap was named in reference to the co-located pass between the Barunga Range to the north and Hummock Range to the south. The word 'Barunga' derives from an indigenous term meaning "gap in the range". See Barunga Range § Etymology

Barunga Gap was a station between Bute and Snowtown on the Kadina-Brinkworth railway line from 1879 until it closed in 1993.

== History ==
Robert Barr Smith, the rich and influential new owner of the Hummocks Run, arrived in the locality accompanied by surveyors in February 1870. The first paved road to Kadina was completed at Barunga Gap in 1874, and a railway was connected from Kadina in 1878.

The railway line from Kadina to Barunga Gap was begun in approximately August 1877 by day labour and piecework, to afford employment for the miners thrown out of work on the (Yorke) Peninsula. The completion of this contract was expected by December 31,1878.

The railway allowed Barr Smith to ship his massive wool exports directly to the Elders & Fyffes cargo ships at Wallaroo for auction in England, and surrounding farmers and graziers to use the port at Wallaroo instead of Port Wakefield, which was shallow and required transshipment to waiting shipping using small boats.

A government town was surveyed in 1879 at Barunga Gap and proclaimed as Percyton in 1880. Later the name was changed to the current designation.

== See also ==
- Hundred of Barunga
- Hundred of Cameron
- Barunga Range
