= Hummock Range =

Range of hills in South Australia

- The Hummocks
- Location within South Australia

Geography
- Country: Australia
- State: South Australia
- Region: Mid North
- Range coordinates: 33°54′33″S 138°7′32″E

The Hummocks or Hummock Range is a range of hills in the southern Quartzites and quartzitic sandstones of the ABC Range Formation extending north from the eastern edge of Yorke Peninsula in South Australia. It is traversed by the Copper Coast Highway immediately west of where it passes around the northern end of Gulf St Vincent. The Augusta Highway passes to the east of the Hummocks. The Hummock Range includes the settlements of South Hummocks and Kulpara. Towards the range's northern end it continues as the Barunga Range north of Barunga Gap, approximately 10 kilometres (6.2 mi) south west of Snowtown.

The Hummocks is a primary source of catchment for Lake Bumbunga near Lochiel.

The Hummocks and Barunga ranges are host to the Snowtown wind farm.
