= Fisherman Bay, South Australia =

Fisherman Bay South Australia
- Coordinates: 33.554530°S 137.939580°E
- Population: 140 (SAL 2021)
- Postcode(s): 5522
- LGA(s): District Council of Barunga West
- State electorate(s): Narungga
- Federal division(s): Grey
Localities around Fisherman Bay:
Spencer Gulf	Wandearah West	Wandearah East
Spencer Gulf	Fisherman Bay	Clements Gap
Spencer Gulf	Port Broughton	Mundoora
- Footnotes: Coordinates

Fisherman Bay is a coastal locality in South Australia, situated at the northern end of the Yorke Peninsula in the District Council of Barunga West. It has been owned by the Fisherman Bay Management Company since 1 March 1974 when the top 10 bidding residents formed the association.

== History ==
Fisherman Bay consists of two unconnected areas on either side of the inlet to Fisherman Bay itself: a small residential area on the peninsula at the southern end, around the Fisherman Bay South Shack Site, immediately north of Port Broughton, and a larger, mostly uninhabited area to the north of the inlet. The village contains approximately 400 dwellings, with a shop and petrol station and community hall. The northern portion mostly consists of a large area known as "Salt Swamp", but also includes the Fisherman Bay North Shack Site across the inlet, and further to the north, the historic former RAAF Gunnery Range on Old Pirie Road, which is listed on the South Australian Heritage Register. The locator map in the infobox appears to go offshore as the base map shows the back of the beach and the locality boundary extends to low tide.

Shacks were first built at Fisherman Bay in the 1920s. The land was originally owned by the Hornby family, with shack owners paying them a "casual license" fee. In 1973, they sold the land to local residents, with the top ten bidders forming Fishermans Bay Management Pty Ltd to own and operate the village. The company still holds title to the land, with residents paying a fee of approximately $800. Issues around the security of land tenure have been raised as a significant issue for the further development of the village. Under this arrangement, the District Council of Barunga West is largely responsible for the coastal foreshore, while the company, who own the roads, water and sewer infrastructure, are responsible for the general area. The company has been gradually moving towards altering the land to freehold title over several years; however, as of 2015, they still continued to manage the majority of residential lots at Fisherman Bay.

The Fisherman Bay Progress Association was first established in 1963, and operates the town's annual Easter Races children's sports day.

Fisherman Bay was formally established in 1998 when boundaries were created "for the long established local name".
