= Wokurna, South Australia =

Wokurna South Australia
- Coordinates: 33.7°S 138.1°E
- Population: 61 (SAL 2021)
- Postcode(s): 5520
- LGA(s): Barunga West Council; Wakefield Regional Council
- State electorate(s): Narungga
- Federal division(s): Grey
Localities around Wokurna:
Port Broughton		Mundoora
	Wokurna	Snowtown
	Bute	Barunga Gap

Wokurna is a locality in the Mid North region of South Australia to the west of the Barunga Range and southeast of Port Broughton.

The name Wokurna is believed to be an Aboriginal word for "to arrive". There was a school in the area from 1888 to 1923.

Part of the Snowtown Wind Farm is on the ridge on the eastern edge of Wokurna.
