= Alford, South Australia =

Alford South Australia
- Coordinates: 33.8166°S 137.8226°E
- Population: 159 (SAL 2021)
- Established: 1882
- Postcode(s): 5555
- Location: 143 km (89 mi) N of Adelaide city centre; 20 km (12 mi) N of Kadina
- LGA(s): District Council of Barunga West
- State electorate(s): Narungga
- Federal division(s): Grey
Localities around Alford:
| Tickera | Ward Hill | Port Broughton |
| Tickera | Alford | Bute |
| Wallaroo Plain | Willamulka | Thomas Plain |
- Footnotes: Location; Adjoining localities

Alford is a settlement in South Australia. Alford is in the Hundred of Tickera, northern Yorke Peninsula, about midway between the towns of Kadina and Port Broughton. The natural landform is undulating fertile plains, which often feature limestone and dunes. Founded on the agricultural industry, which surrounds the township, most of the original mallee scrub vegetation has been cleared for highly productive broad-acre wheat and barley farming, plus grazing and mixed farming.

== History ==
The Narungga name for the area around modern day Alford is Bilila Wiila.

The SA Government first surveyed the township in 1882, naming it after Henry Alford (1816–1892), pioneer and inaugural member of the South Australia Police under Henry Inman in 1838. The first blocks were auctioned in September 1882. Within several years there was a small township comprising a hotel (Alford Hotel), general store, churches, school, and blacksmith servicing the surrounding farming community. The state's first automatic telephone exchange was trialled at Alford.

As road transport improved, nearby towns Kadina, Bute, and Port Broughton mostly usurped this role and Alford did not thrive beyond township status.

In 2004 the primary school was closed and most of the students enrolled in Kadina. The town has a hotel, bowls club and a golf course and after the general store's closure the "post office" was moved to the pub. Alford is an important hub for the district and continues to foster social and sporting activities.

== Transport ==
Alford is on the Spencer Highway (South Australia route B89), just north of where the named highway diverges towards the coast at Wallaroo and the numbered route continues through Kadina, merging again outside of Moonta. The highway continues north through Port Broughton to Port Pirie.

== See also ==
- Alford (disambiguation)

== Citations and references ==
Citations

References

- Paterson, Roslyn M; Price, Eyvonne L (1984), From stumps to stubble : a history of the district of Bute : incorporating the original district councils of Kulpara and Ninnes, Investigator Press for District Council of Bute, pp. 285–315, ISBN 978-0-85864-077-1
