= Mundoora, South Australia =

Mundoora South Australia
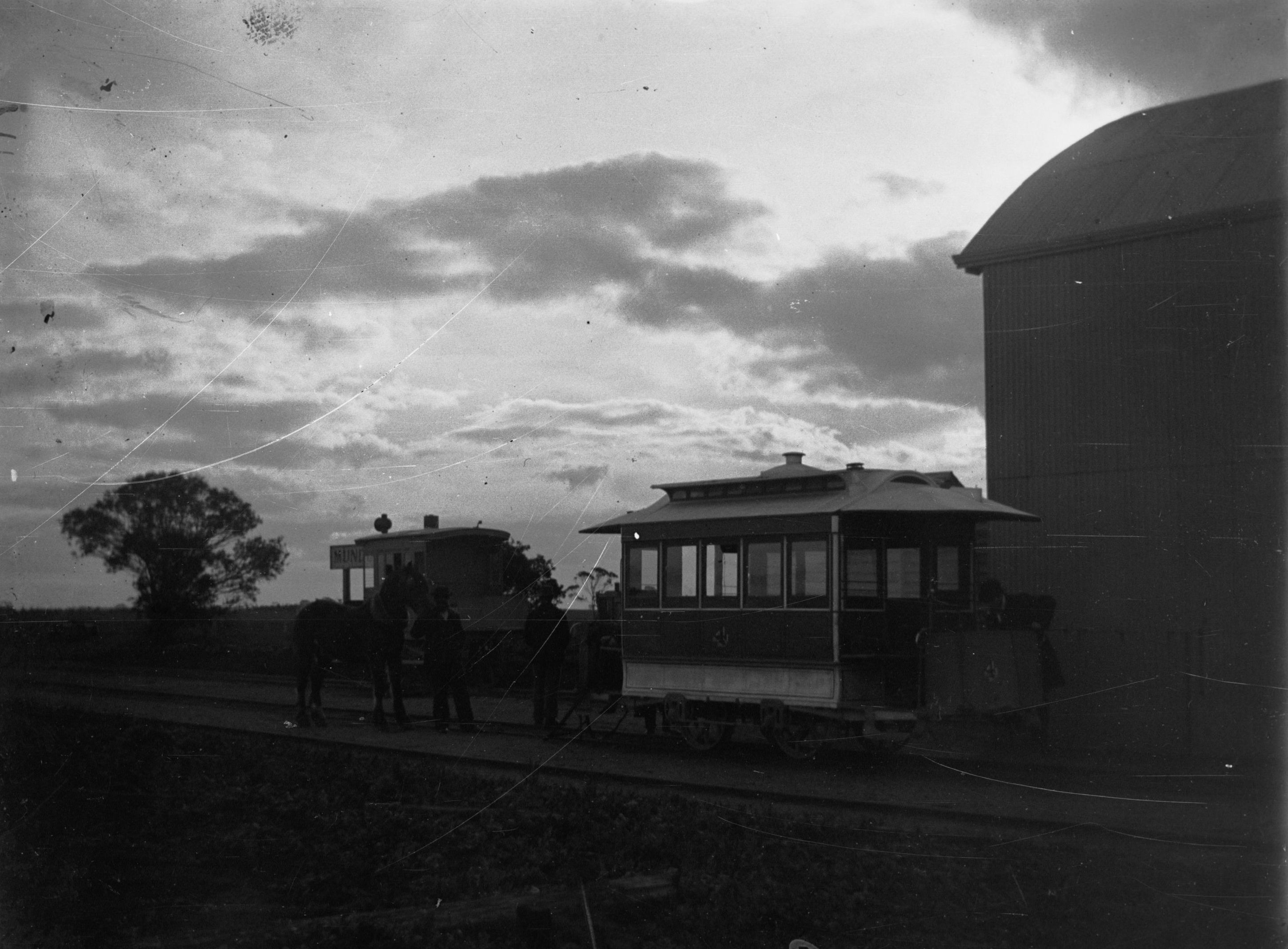
- 'Pie Cart' of the horse drawn railway at Mundoora

- Coordinates: 33.595°S 138.083°E
- Population: 134 (SAL 2021)
- Postcode(s): 5555
- Location: 156 km (97 mi) north of Adelaide city centre; 15 km (9 mi) east of Port Broughton
- LGA(s): Barunga West; Port Pirie; Wakefield
- State electorate(s): Narungga
- Federal division(s): Grey
Mean max temp	Mean min temp	Annual rainfall
24.2 °C; 76 °F	9.0 °C; 48 °F	364.3 mm 14.3 in
Localities around Mundoora:
Fisherman Bay	Clements Gap	Redhill
Port Broughton	Mundoora	Redhill; Collinsfield; Hope Gap
Wokurna	Wokurna; Snowtown	Snowtown
- Footnotes: Climate; Locations; Coordinates; Adjoining localities

Mundoora is a settlement in South Australia, 16 km inland from Port Broughton, to which it was connected by the horse-drawn Port Broughton tramway around 1876. Its tram, dubbed "The Pie Cart", which was described as a "kind of second-hand coffin drawn by one horse" and still in operation in 1923 was later relegated to the Railways Museum and the line dismantled.

== Governance ==
The first local government established in the area was the District Council of Broughton, later called District Council of Redhill. Mundoora was never served by the historic District Council of Mundoora, which was instead based at Port Broughton, 15 km (9.3 mi) to the west. Today the township of Mundoora is in the District Council of Barunga West but the locality is at the meeting point of three local government areas, the Port Pirie Regional Council spanning the north east and Wakefield Regional Council spanning the south east corners of the locality.

Mundoora is in the state electorate of Narungga and the federal electorate of Grey.
