= Port Broughton, South Australia =

Port Broughton
- Town
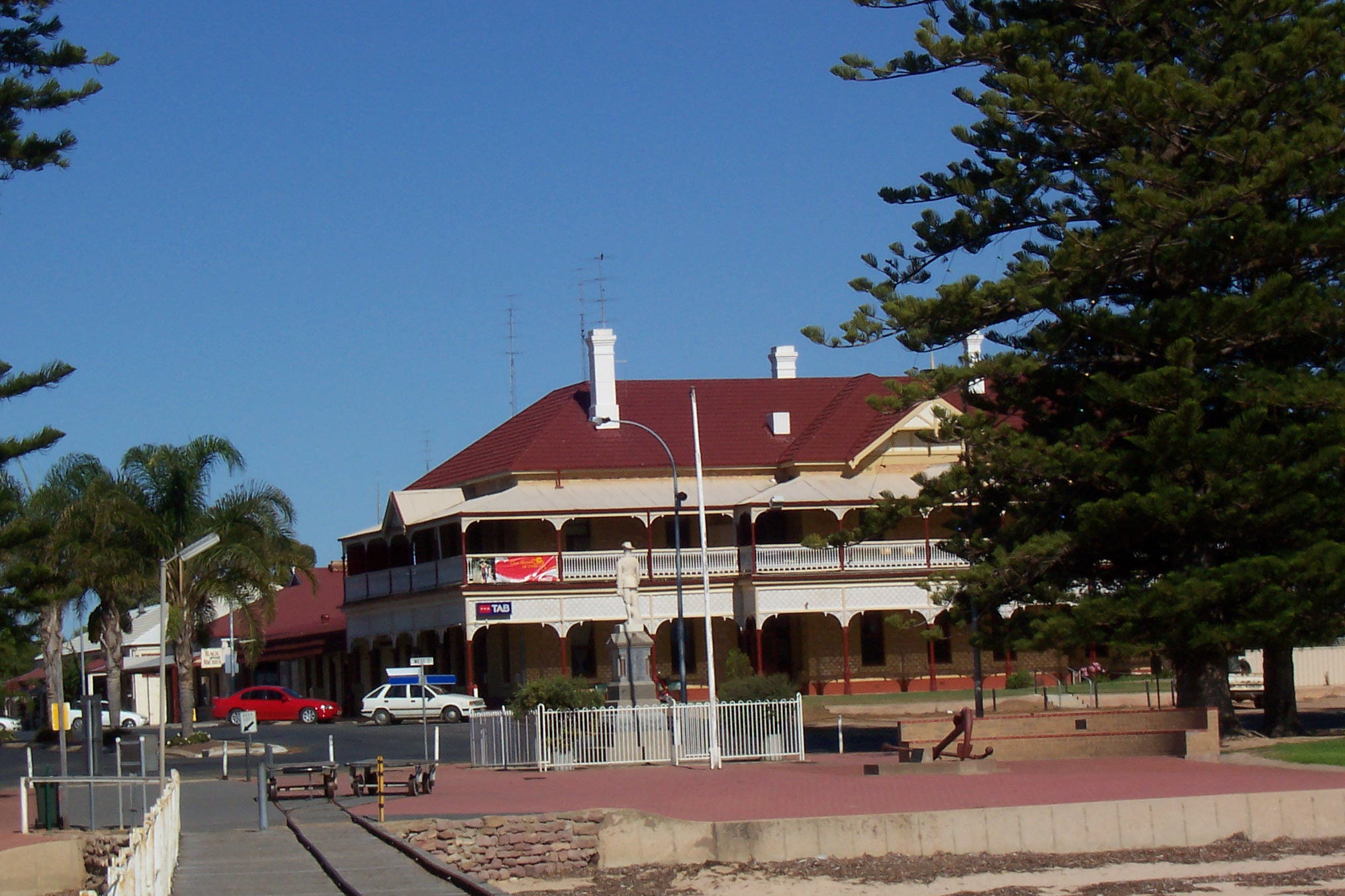
- The Port Broughton Hotel in 2005

- Coordinates: 33°35′0″S 137°56′8″E
- Country: Australia
- State: South Australia
- LGA: District Council of Barunga West
- Location: 170 km (110 mi) North West of Adelaide
- Established: 1876

Government
  - State electorate: Narungga
  - Federal division: Grey

Population
  - Total: 1,116 (UCL 2021)
- Postcode: 5522
- Mean max temp: 24.4 °C (75.9 °F)
- Mean min temp: 12.6 °C (54.7 °F)
- Annual rainfall: 341.3 mm (13.44 in)
Localities around Port Broughton
Spencer Gulf	Fisherman Bay	Clements Gap
Ward Hill	Port Broughton	Mundoora; Wokurna
Alford	Bute; Alford	Bute

Port Broughton is a small South Australian town located at the northern extent of the Yorke Peninsula on the east coast of Spencer Gulf. It is situated about 170 km north-west of Adelaide, and 56 km south of Port Pirie. At the 2016 census, the town of Port Broughton had a population of 1,034.

The close proximity to Adelaide (two hours' drive) makes it a popular tourist destination, with the number of people in town swelling to over 4,000 in the summer holidays.

== History ==
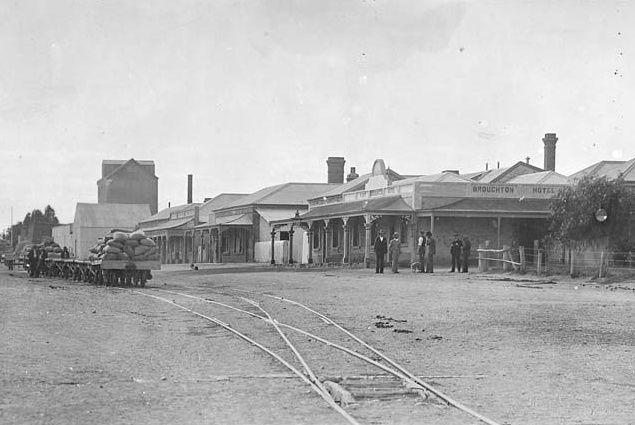
Port Broughton Hotel, facing east, in 1914

The land around Port Broughton was initially used for grazing, however the local conditions were unsuitable and the land was divided up into acre lots and sold.

Port Broughton was surveyed in 1871 to service the surrounding wheat and barley growers on the recommendation of Captain Henry Dale. It is on a sheltered inlet called Mundoora Arm Inlet at the extreme northern end of Yorke Peninsula. The town is named after the Broughton River (named by Edward John Eyre after William Broughton), the mouth of which is about 40 kilometres (25 mi) north of the township.

== Transport ==
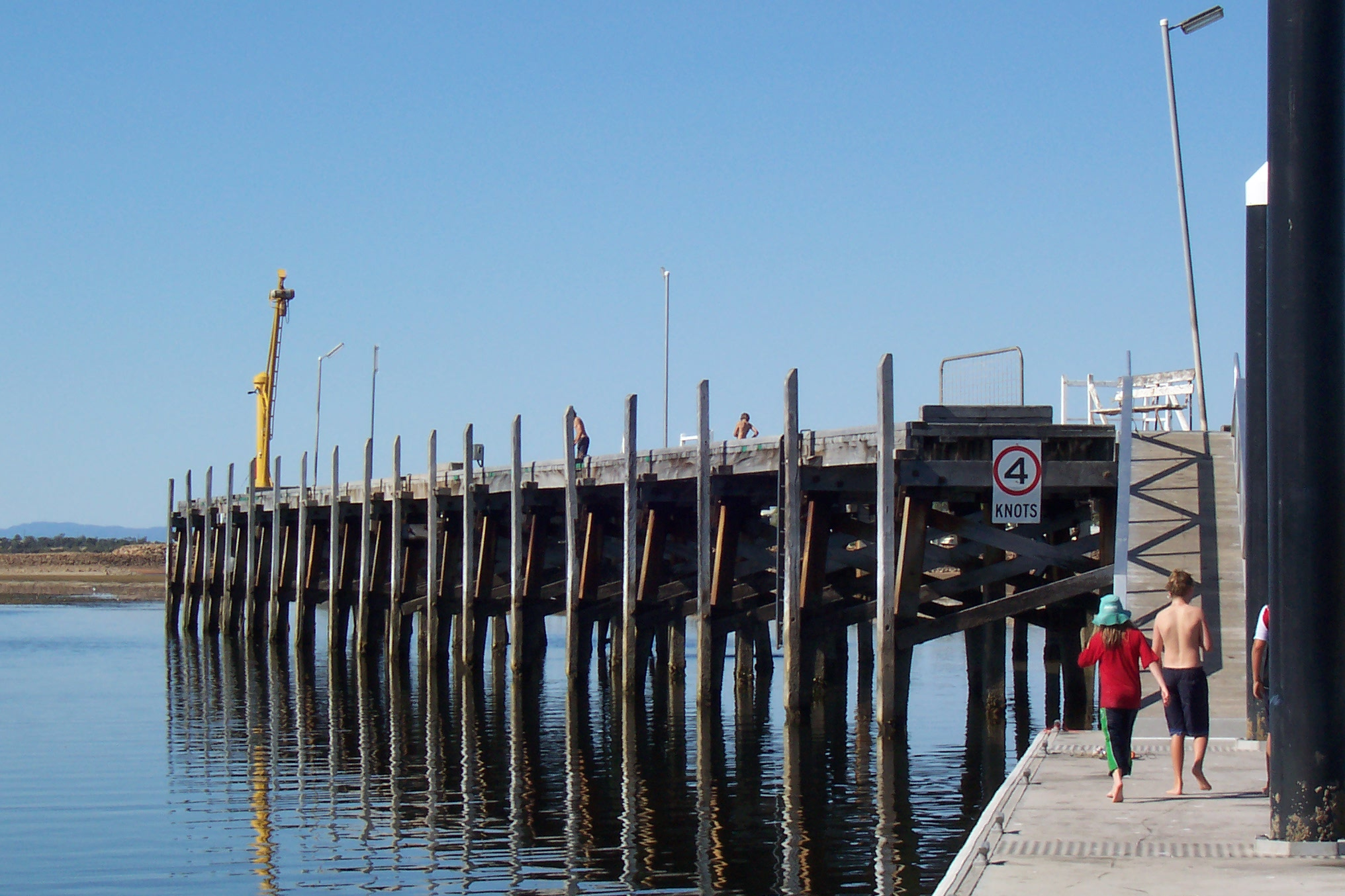
The face of the T-shaped jetty at Port Broughton

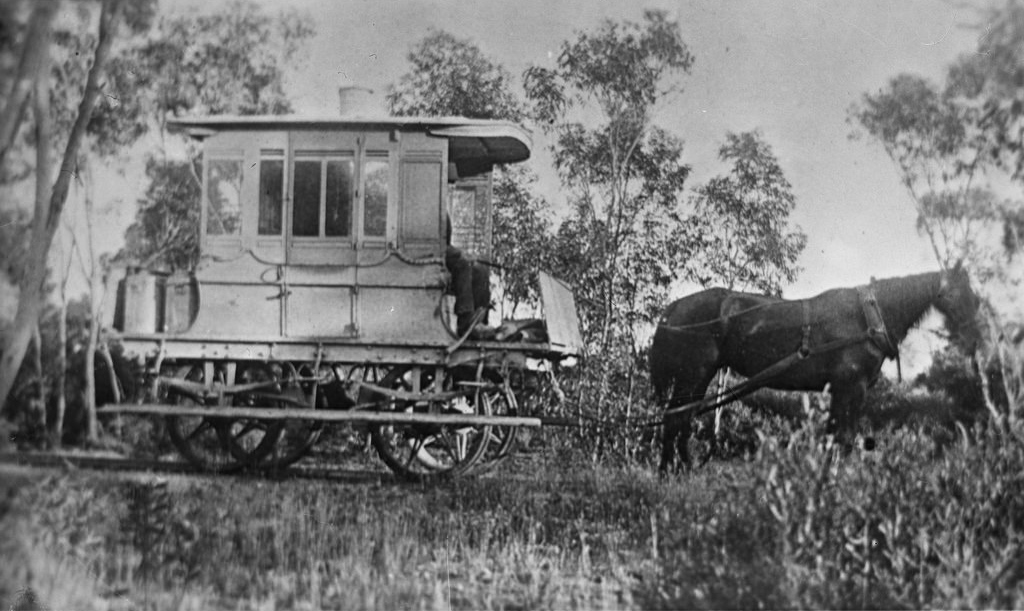
The 10 miles long horse-drawn tramway was opened in 1876

Built in 1876, the T-shaped jetty was serviced by an isolated 3 ft 6 in (1,067 mm) narrow gauge railway line from Mundoora, 16 km inland and uphill. The Port Broughton railway line, officially opened on 11 March 1876, brought the grain down to the port. Horses were used to tow the empty wagons uphill, but they were sent downhill powered only by gravity, with a driver to operate the brakes. The passenger service ceased on 17 September 1925, but the grain traffic continued. During January, 1926, a Fordson rail tractor displaced the animal power. From 1931, the railways contracted out the service to a private operator.

The service ceased altogether on 3 August 1942, but the tractor continued to shunt wheat wagons between the station yard and the jetty until moved elsewhere. Ketches carried the grain from the jetty 8 kilometres out into the gulf where the larger windjammers were anchored to carry the grain back to England. The windjammers ceased to call in 1949.

Locomotives were proposed in 1906.

=== Disappearance of aviator Edward Gage ===
In June 1943, Edward Gage, an electrical fitter who worked for BHP in Whyalla, was killed after his Tiger Moth plane ran out of fuel and crash landed in the Spencer Gulf. He was last seen flying over Port Broughton, en route to Whyalla from Parafield. A coronial inquiry followed but neither his remains nor that of the plane were found. In January 1990, Goolwa man Ron Anchor arranged a search party to find the wreck.

== Geography ==
Lying on the eastern side of Spencer Gulf, Port Broughton's coastline is relatively protected, resulting in large expanses of shallow water and seagrasses, tidal flats and vast areas of mangroves that flank the inlet on which the town is built. The small town of Fisherman Bay lies 5 km north of Port Broughton and has much the same coastal features. Between the mouth of Fisherman Bay and Port Broughton lies Shag Island, an important breeding site for several species of cormorant. The Broughton River lies further north toward Port Pirie, where its estuary is located. Further inland, most of the land is fairly featureless farming country, with only fragments of the original vegetation remaining.

== Media ==
Port Broughton was briefly home to a short lived newspaper published by William John George and James Sisely. Originally called Port Broughton Echo (1887), it was printed by the Northern Argus in Clare. It was then renamed to Broughton Echo (1887-1888), but soon ceased publication in July 1888.

== Economy ==
Since its establishment, Port Broughton's economy has largely been driven by agriculture, in particular cereal crops. Commercial fishing is also an important part of the economy, with scalefish and Blue swimmer crabs accounting for much of the catch. As of 2010 Port Broughton supports a prawning fleet.

Like many towns on the Yorke Peninsula, Port Broughton is a tourist destination, with activities such as fishing, crabbing and a variety of watersports being popular. The town has a boat ramp for such activities. Short-term accommodation includes two caravan parks, a number of units and a motel. Nearby Fisherman Bay has many shacks belonging to holiday-makers, as well a boat ramp for small vessels.

== Community ==
The recorded population the township of Port Broughton at the time of the 2011 census was 982 (Port Broughton district population 1424). The majority of the population (838) were Australian born, with the majority of immigrants coming from the United Kingdom. The census also found that over half the population of Port Broughton is over 55, with the median age being 61, suggesting the town is popular with retirees. Christianity is the dominant religion in the region, and is well serviced by a number of churches.

The town has a number of sporting clubs including cricket and netball clubs, and an Australian rules football club playing in the Northern Areas Football Association as the Broughton-Mundoora Eagles.

Port Broughton Area School and Port Broughton District Hospital & Health Service provide the towns educational and medical needs respectively

== Notable residents ==
- Phil Cummings. Author
- George Hewett (footballer). AFL player
- Sally Sara Journalist (ABC)

== Government ==
Port Broughton is the seat of the District Council of Barunga West. The mayor currently is Leonnie Kerley. It is in the state electoral district of Narungga and the federal Division of Grey.
