= Barunga Range =

Range of hills in South Australia

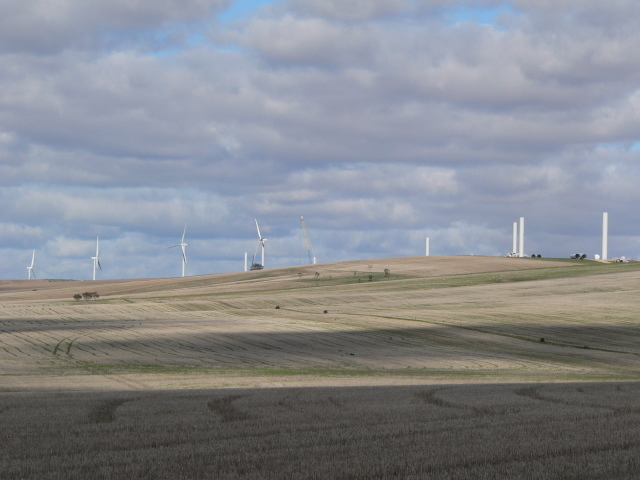
- Clements Gap Wind farm, Barunga Range SA

Highest point
- Coordinates: 33°41′54″S 138°10′1″E

Geography
- Location within South Australia
- Country: Australia
- State: South Australia
- Region: Mid North
- Range coordinates: 33°27′18″S 138°9′48″E

The Barunga Range is a range of hills in the northern Mount Lofty Ranges starting near Clements Gap and Merriton in South Australia's Mid North. At the range's southern end it merges with Hummock Range at Barunga Gap, approximately 10 kilometres (6.2 mi) south west of Snowtown. The name 'Barunga' derives from an indigenous term meaning "gap in the range".

The Barunga and Hummock ranges are host to the Clements Gap and Snowtown wind farms.

== Etymology ==
According to the Australian Biospecimen Network Association, Barunga is an indigenous term meaning "gap in the range", but South Australian historian Geoffrey Manning instead states it means "place for meat". The term was also used to name Barunga Hill, north west of Snowtown, and Barunga Creek, which flows off from Barunga Range to the south west of Snowtown. The term was also used in turn to name the cadastral Hundred of Barunga (established 1869) which approximates the area of the Barunga Range.
