= Mid North =

Region of South Australia

Coordinates: 33°S 138°E

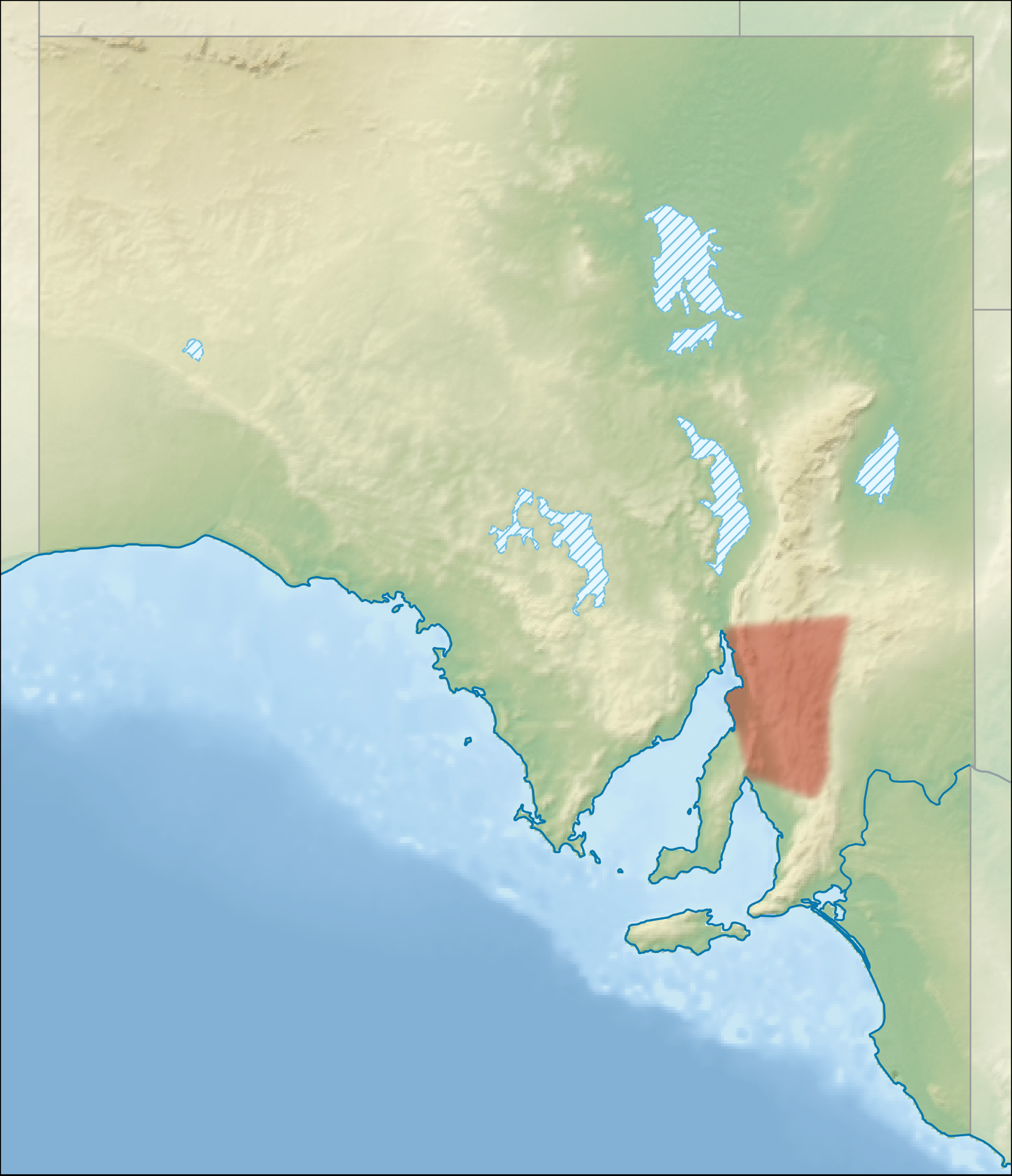
Mid North region approximate bounds within South Australia

The Mid North is a region of South Australia, north of the Adelaide Plains and south of the Far North and the outback. It is generally accepted to extend from Spencer Gulf east to the Barrier Highway, including the coastal plain, the southern part of the Flinders Ranges, and the northern part of the Mount Lofty Ranges. The Temperate Grassland of South Australia cover most of the area.

== History ==
The main Indigenous group in the area are the Ngadjuri people. During the early colonial era, particularly in the 1850s and 1860s, disputes and conflicts occurred between settlers and the Aboriginal people. The Ngadjuri people now hold native title rights over the area. The extreme south west of the Mid North region is a part of the traditional lands of the Kaurna people.

== Agriculture ==
The area was settled as early as 1840 (South Australia settlement began in 1836) and provided early farming and mining outputs for the fledgling colony. Farming is still significant in the area, particularly wheat, sheep and grapevines. Grapes are grown in the Clare Valley and Southern Flinders Ranges wine regions. Copper was formerly mined at Kapunda and Burra.

== Weather districts ==
For the purposes of weather forecasting, the Mid North region is divided horizontally into "Flinders" for the northern portion and "Mid North" for the southern portion by the Bureau of Meteorology. In the northern portion forecasts are published for: Hawker, Port Augusta and Ororroo. Towns for which forecasts are published in the southern region are: Port Pirie, Jamestown, Crystal Brook, Clare, Roseworthy and Snowtown.

== See also ==
- Regions of South Australia
