= Port Gawler, South Australia =

Town in South Australia

Port Gawler
- Town
- Coordinates: 34°38′52″S 138°28′15″E
- Country: Australia
- State: South Australia
- Region: Barossa Light and Lower North
- LGA: Adelaide Plains Council
- Location: 43 km (27 mi) N of Adelaide; 35 km (22 mi) w of Gawler; 11 km (6.8 mi) SW of Two Wells
- Established: By 1869 (town); June 1997 (locality)
- Abolished: 23 June 1960 (town)

Government
  - State electorate: Taylor
  - Federal division: Grey

Population
  - Total: 112 (SAL 2021)
- Time zone: UTC+9:30 (ACST)
  - Summer (DST): UTC+10:30 (ACST)
- Postcode: 5501
- County: Gawler
- Mean max temp: 22.7 °C (72.9 °F)
- Mean min temp: 11.2 °C (52.2 °F)
- Annual rainfall: 431.0 mm (16.97 in)
Localities around Port Gawler
Gulf St Vincent	Middle Beach	Two Wells
Gulf St Vincent	Port Gawler	Two Wells
Gulf St Vincent	Buckland Park	Riverlea Park

Port Gawler is a locality and former port on Gulf St Vincent on the central Adelaide Plains in South Australia. Port Gawler is located 43 kilometres (27 mi) north west of Adelaide in the Adelaide Plains Council local government area at the mouth of the Gawler River.

Port Gawler was named in 1867 and a government town surveyed around 1869, but was officially declared to have ceased to exist on 23 June 1960. The boundaries for the modern locality were created for the long established name in June 1997, incorporating both the former government town and the private subdivision of Milner.

== Local government ==
The first local government body established in the area was the District Council of Mudla Wirra, proclaimed in 1854. Mudla Wirra council encompassed those parts of the Hundred of Port Gawler and Hundred of Grace south of the River Light as well as all of the Hundred of Mudla Wirra. This included Port Gawler itself. In 1856 those parts in the hundreds of Grace and Port Gawler seceded to form the District Council of Port Gawler. In 1935 Port Gawler council amalgamated with Dublin and Grace councils to form the District Council of Mallala (initially called District Council of Light, much later called Adelaide Plains Council).

There is evidence of unidentified boat wreckage in the Gawler River estuary at Port Gawler. The only documentation of a shipwreck in the vicinity concerns that of the cutterYoung Recruit, which sank in about 6 fathoms there on 4 November 1902.

== See also ==
- Gawler River (South Australia)
