= Port Gawler =

Port Gawler may refer to:

- Port Gawler, South Australia, a locality and a former town
- Port Gawler Conservation Park, a former protected area in South Australia
- District Council of Port Gawler, a former local government area in South Australia
- Hundred of Port Gawler, a cadastral unit in South Australia

== See also ==
- Gawler (disambiguation)
