= Alma, South Australia =

Alma
- Town
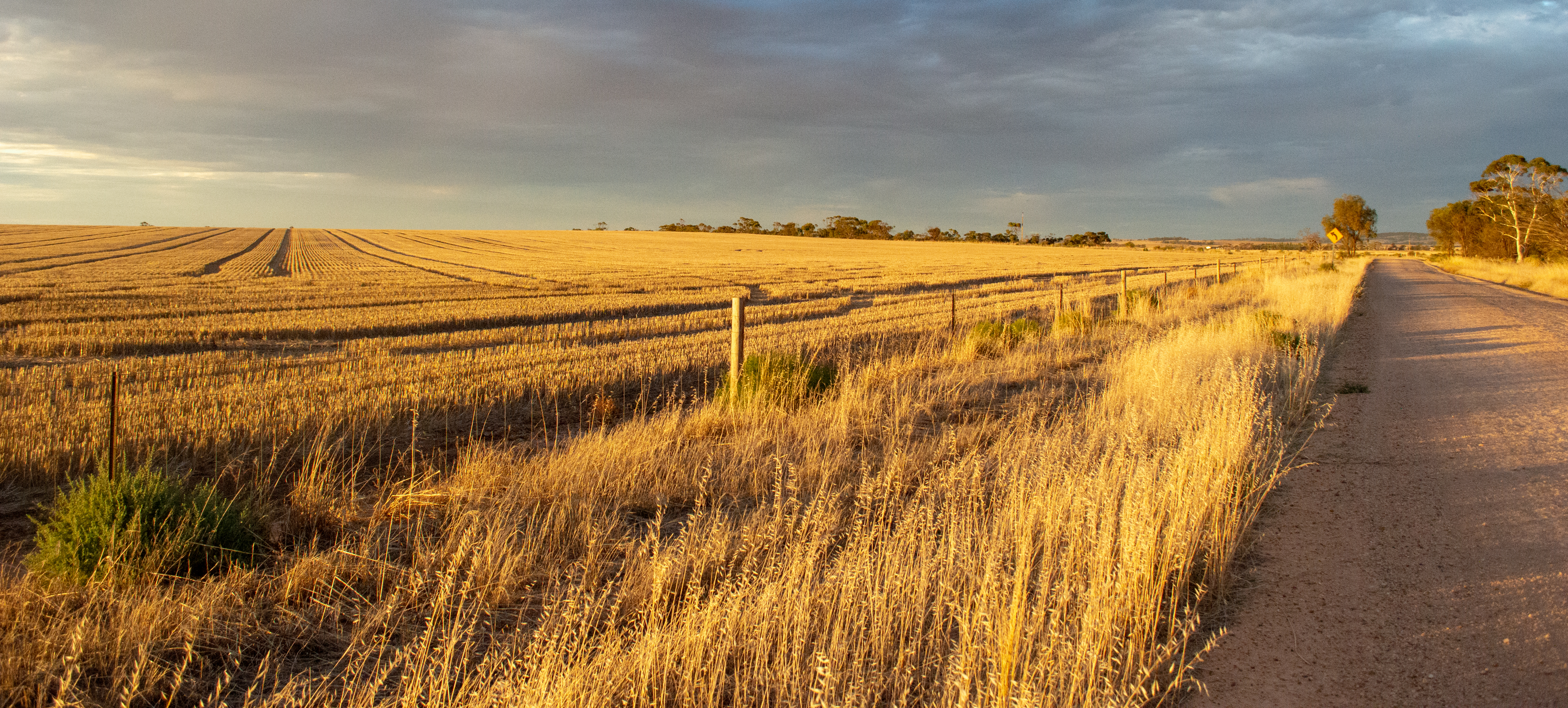
- Farmland in Alma

- Interactive map of Alma
- Coordinates: 34°16′S 138°38′E
- Country: Australia
- State: South Australia
- LGAs: Wakefield RC; Clare & Gilbert Valleys DC
- Location: 7 km (4.3 mi) E of Owen

Government
  - State electorate: Goyder
  - Federal division: Grey

Population
  - Total: 66 (SAL 2021)
- Time zone: UTC+9:30 (ACST)
  - Summer (DST): UTC+10:30 (ACDT)
- Postcode: 5401
Localities around Alma
| Balaklava | Salter Springs | Giles Corner |
| Owen | Alma | Tarlee |
| Stockyard Creek | Hamley Bridge | Stockport |

Alma is a small town in South Australia halfway between the Wakefield River, to the north, and River Light to the south. Alma, Alma South and Alma Plains were named for the cadastral Hundred of Alma in which they lie, which was in turn named after the Battle of the Alma, the site of an allied victory in the Crimean War.

Alma is located approximately 74 km from Adelaide and covers an area of 102.786 km^{2}. It has a recorded population of 66 residents.

== Local government ==
For about five years from the mid-1860s the township and surrounding locality was governed at the local level by the Stockport and Rhynie councils, seated to the southeast and northeast of Alma, respectively. The District Council of Alma Plains was proclaimed in 1870, severing portions of Stockport and Rhynie, to provide dedicated local government to Alma. The Alma Range to the east of the township formed a natural boundary with Rhynie and Stockport.

The council was amalgamated with Dalkey in 1932, bringing Alma under local governance of Owen Council. From 1983, Alma came under the local governance of the much larger District Council of Wakefield Plains when that council was formed by the amalgamation of Owen with Balaklava and Port Wakefield councils. The regional councils further coalesced in 1997 when Wakefield Plains amalgamated with Blyth-Snowtown to form the Wakefield Regional Council which presently governs Alma at the local level.

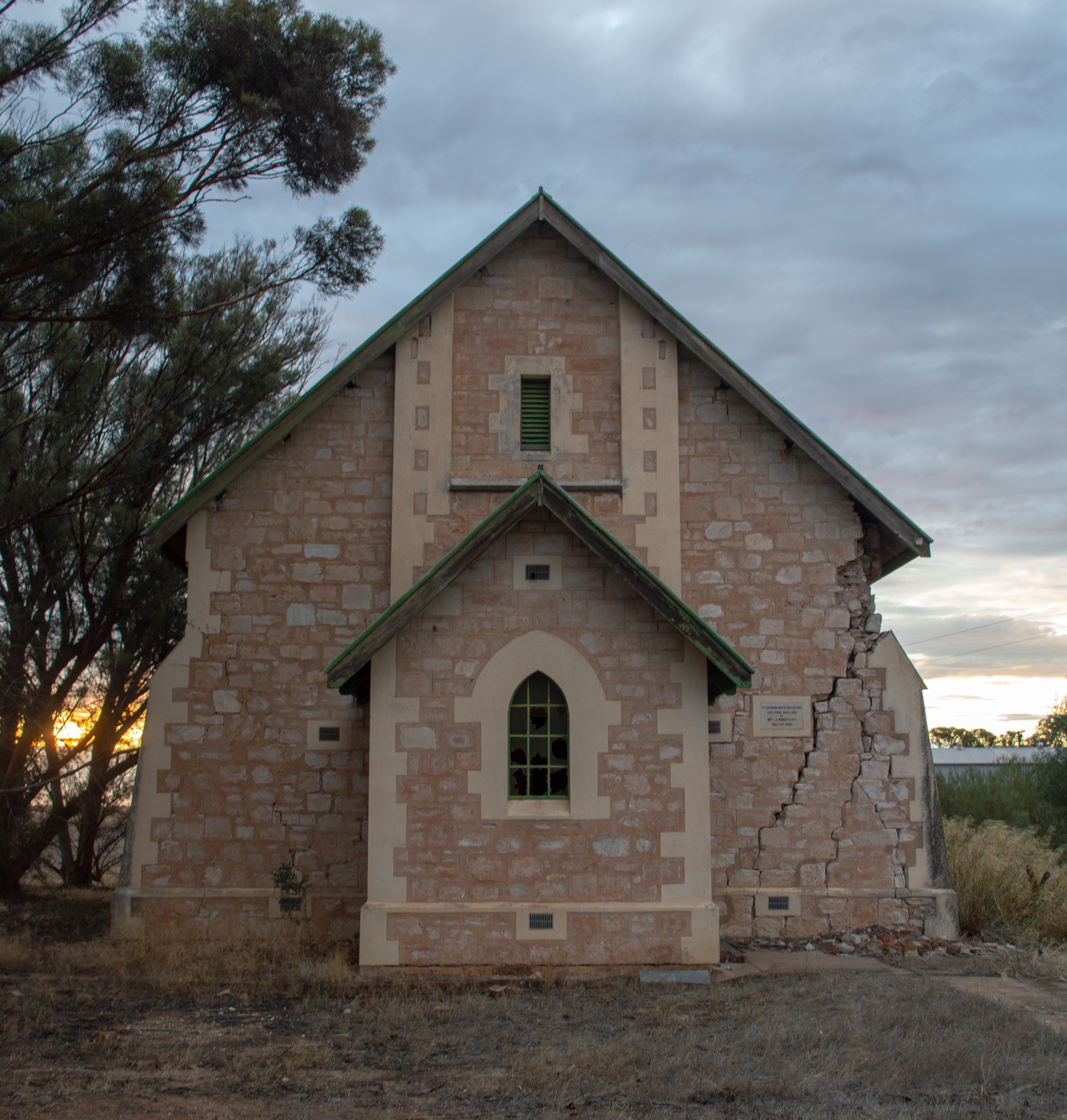
Former Congregational Church

== Churches ==
There are no longer any churches operating in the Alma area. There are or have been churches and cemeteries associated with several denominations:

- Church of Christ (1862–1938), corner of Branson Road and Alma South Road
- Congregational Church at Alma Plains (1865–1928), corner of Almond Tree Road and Freebairn Road
  - Replaced by new building in Alma township (corner of Alma Road and Almond Tree Road), 1928–1972
- Primitive Methodist Church (corner of Owen Road and McKenzie Road) original building 1866 replaced 1878

== Notable people ==
Notable from or who have lived in Alma include:

- Robert Caldwell, farmer and politician
- James Gilbert Woolcock, metallurgist, mining consultant, mining engineer
