= Gawler Ranges (disambiguation) =

Gawler Ranges is a mountain range in South Australia.

Gawler Ranges may also refer to the following places in South Australia.

- Gawler Ranges National Park, a protected area
- Gawler Ranges, South Australia, a locality
- Gawler Ranges Conservation Park, a protected area
- Gawler Ranges Important Bird Area, a designation associated with the Gawler Ranges National Park.

== See also ==
- Gawler Range Volcanics
- Gawler (disambiguation)
