= Port Gawler Conservation Park =

Protected area in South Australia

- IUCN category III (natural monument or feature)
- Location within South Australia
- Location: South Australia
- Nearest city: Port Gawler
- Coordinates: 34°40′12″S 138°26′23″E
- Area: 4.18 km^{2} (1.61 sq mi)
- Established: 11 February 1971
- Governing body: Department of Environment, Water and Natural Resources (2017)

Port Gawler Conservation Park (formerly Port Gawler National Park) was a protected area in the Australian state of South Australian located at the east side of Gulf St Vincent on the west side of the locality of Port Gawler. The conservation park covered an area of intertidal mangroves immediately south of Port Gawler beach.

The conservation park consists of land in Section 483 in the Hundred of Port Adelaide and Section 616 of the Hundred of Port Gawler. The land first received protected area status as the Port Gawler National Park proclaimed on 11 February 1971 under the National Parks Act 1966. On 27 April 1972, the national park was reconstituted as the Port Gawler Conservation Park under the National Parks and Wildlife Act 1972. Section 181 in the Hundred of Port Gawler was added to the conservation park prior to October 1980. It was abolished on 8 August 2017 and its land holding was transferred to the Adelaide International Bird Sanctuary National Park—Winaityinaityi Pangkara.

In 1980, the conservation park was described as follows:

A tidal flat featuring a mangrove (Avicennia marina) low woodland and small areas of samphire (Tecticornia spp.) shrubland at the mouth of the Gawler River. The park also includes a low shell-grit dune surrounded by mangroves but exhibiting a flora which includes dry-land elements such as Callitris preissii and Myoporum insulare... One of the larger areas of the Mangrove and Samphire association conserved in the state, an association that has been markedly depleted in South Australia. Port Gawler Conservation Park, in conjunction with other mangrove areas, is an important breeding and feeding ground for commercially important marine fauna, including sea garfish, silver whiting, blue swimmer crabs and western King prawns.

The conservation park was classified as an IUCN Category III protected area. In 1980, it was listed on the now-defunct Register of the National Estate.
