= Hundred of Alma =

Alma
- Cadastral division
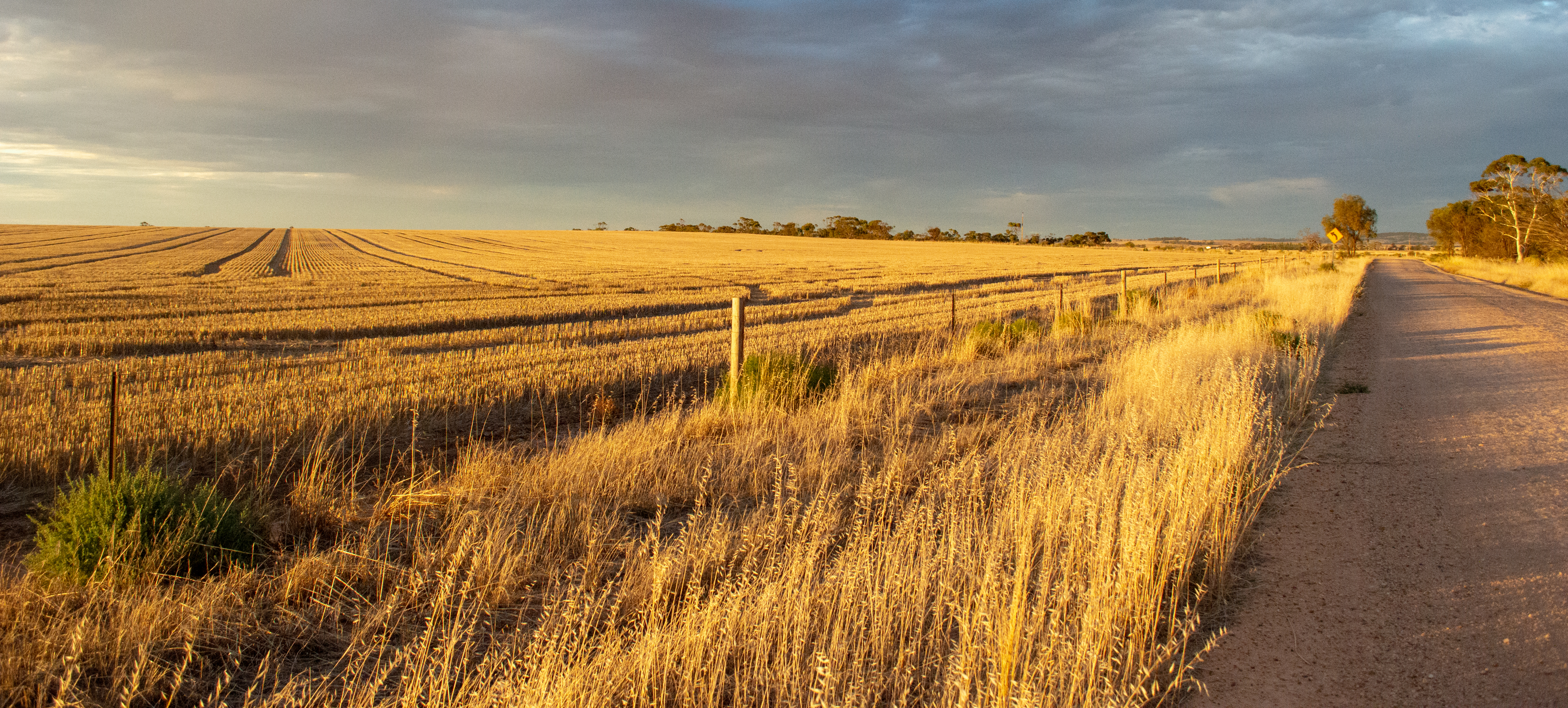
- Wheat in Alma

- Coordinates: 34.240°S 138.647°E
- Country: Australia
- State: South Australia
- Region: Northern Adelaide Plains
- Established: 22 May 1856

Area
  - Total: 360 km^{2} (138 sq mi)
- County: Gawler
Lands administrative divisions around Alma
Hall	Upper Wakefield	Saddleworth
Dalkey	Alma	Gilbert
Grace	Mudla Wirra	Light

The Hundred of Alma is a cadastral unit of hundred located on the northern Adelaide Plains of South Australia spanning the township of Alma and the Alma Plains. The hundred was proclaimed in 1856 in the County of Gawler and named by Governor Richard Graves MacDonnell for the River Alma on the Crimean Peninsula, the location of the Battle of the Alma, the first Allied victory in the Crimean War. The hundred is bounded on the north by the Wakefield River and on the south by the Light River

The Hundred of Alma includes all of the localities of Alma, Salter Springs, Woolshed Flat and parts of the localities of Hamley Bridge, Stockyard Creek, Undalya, Rhynie, Riverton, Giles Corner, Stockport. The largest town is now Hamley Bridge near the southern boundary.

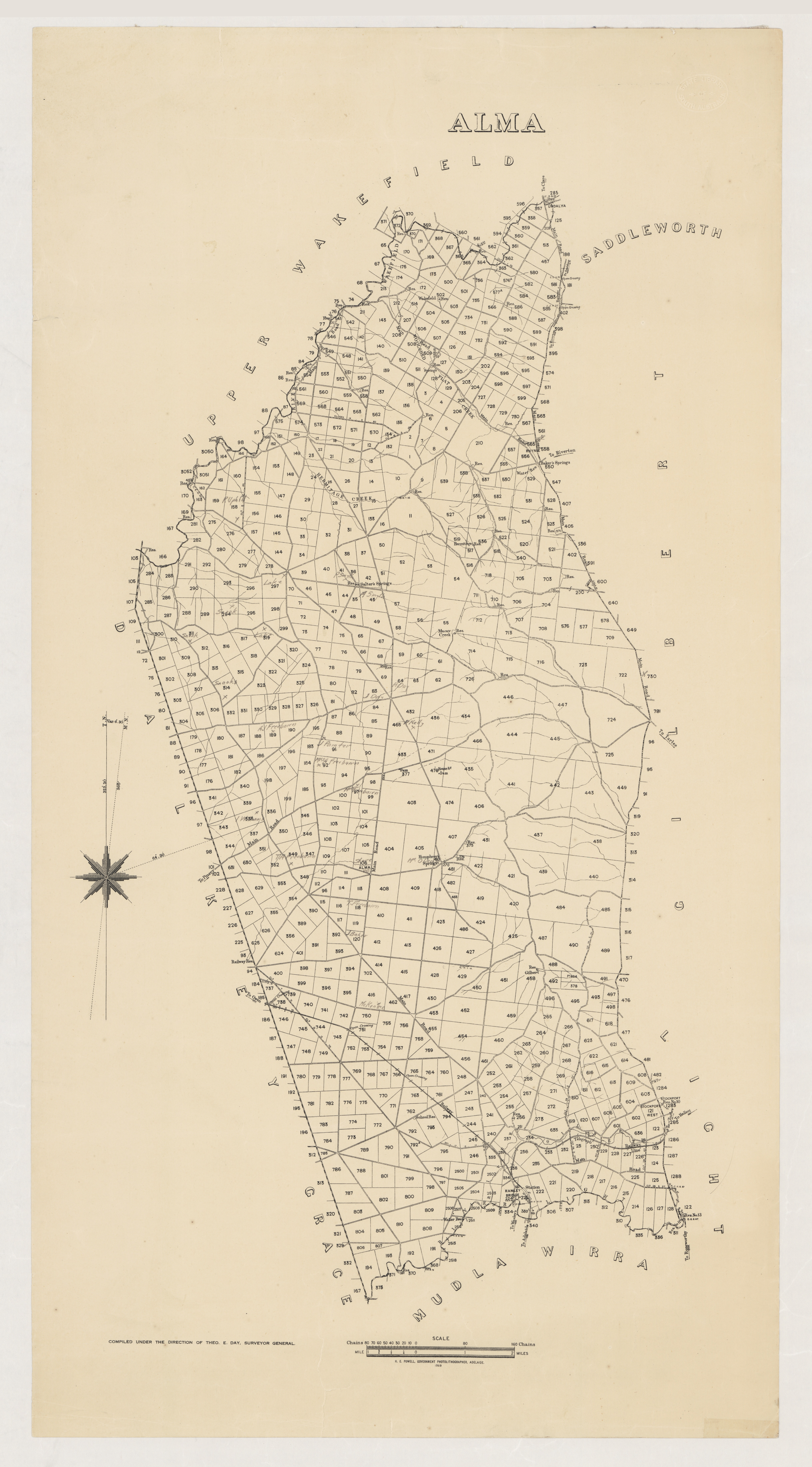
Plan of Hundred of Alma, 1929

== Local government ==
The District Council of Rhynie was the first local government body established within the hundred. It was proclaimed in October 1865 and included approximately the northern half of the hundred. Its establishment was closely followed by that of the District Council of Stockport just a month later. Stockport council covered approximately the southern half of the hundred as well as small parts of the Hundred of Gilbert and Hundred of Light easterly adjacent. The council area lay either side of the Gilbert River from Giles Corner in the north to the Gilbert's confluence with the River Light at Hamley Bridge in the south.

Fifteen years on, in 1870, the District Council of Alma Plains was established by severing the western halves of Rhynie and Stockport councils. This meant that the hundred was roughly split in half, vertically, by the Gilbert River, with Alma Plains council administering the west and Rhynie and Stockport continuing to administer the east.

In 1932 Alma Plains council was amalgamated with the westerly adjacent District Council of Dalkey to create the new District Council of Owen. In the same year the Stockport and Rhynie councils amalgamated with the District Council of Gilbert to their east to create the new District Council of Riverton. From this time local governance of the hundred was thus split between Owen in the west and Riverton in the east.

In 1983, Owen council became a part of the District Council of Wakefield Plains. Then in 1997, Wakefield Plains council itself became a part of the much larger Wakefield Regional Council. On the same day in 1997, Riverton council became a part of the much larger District Council of Clare and Gilbert Valleys, leaving local governance of the hundred still split down the middle with Wakefield in the west and Clare and Gilbert Valleys in the east.
