= Riverlea Park, South Australia =

Northern suburb of Adelaide, South Australia

Riverlea Park
- Suburb
- Interactive map of Riverlea Park
- Coordinates: 34.66°S 138.52°E
- Country: Australia
- State: South Australia
- LGA: City of Playford
- Location: 37 km (23 mi) north of Adelaide
- Established: 2022

Government
  - State electorate: Taylor
  - Federal division: Spence
- Postcode: 5120
Suburbs around Riverlea Park
Port Gawler	Two Wells
	Riverlea Park
	Buckland Park	Virginia

Riverlea Park is a northern suburb of Adelaide in South Australia. It was created by excluding part of the suburb of Buckland Park in February 2022.

The northern boundary of Riverlea Park is the Gawler River, and its eastern boundary is Port Wakefield Road.

Riverlea Park contains a large urban housing estate under development by Walker Corporation. The main entrance is controlled by a new set of traffic lights installed on Port Wakefield Road. At the time the suburb was created, 605 lots had been sold for housing. The remaining part of Buckland Park remains predominantly rural.
