= Hundred of Dalkey =

Dalkey
- Cadastral division
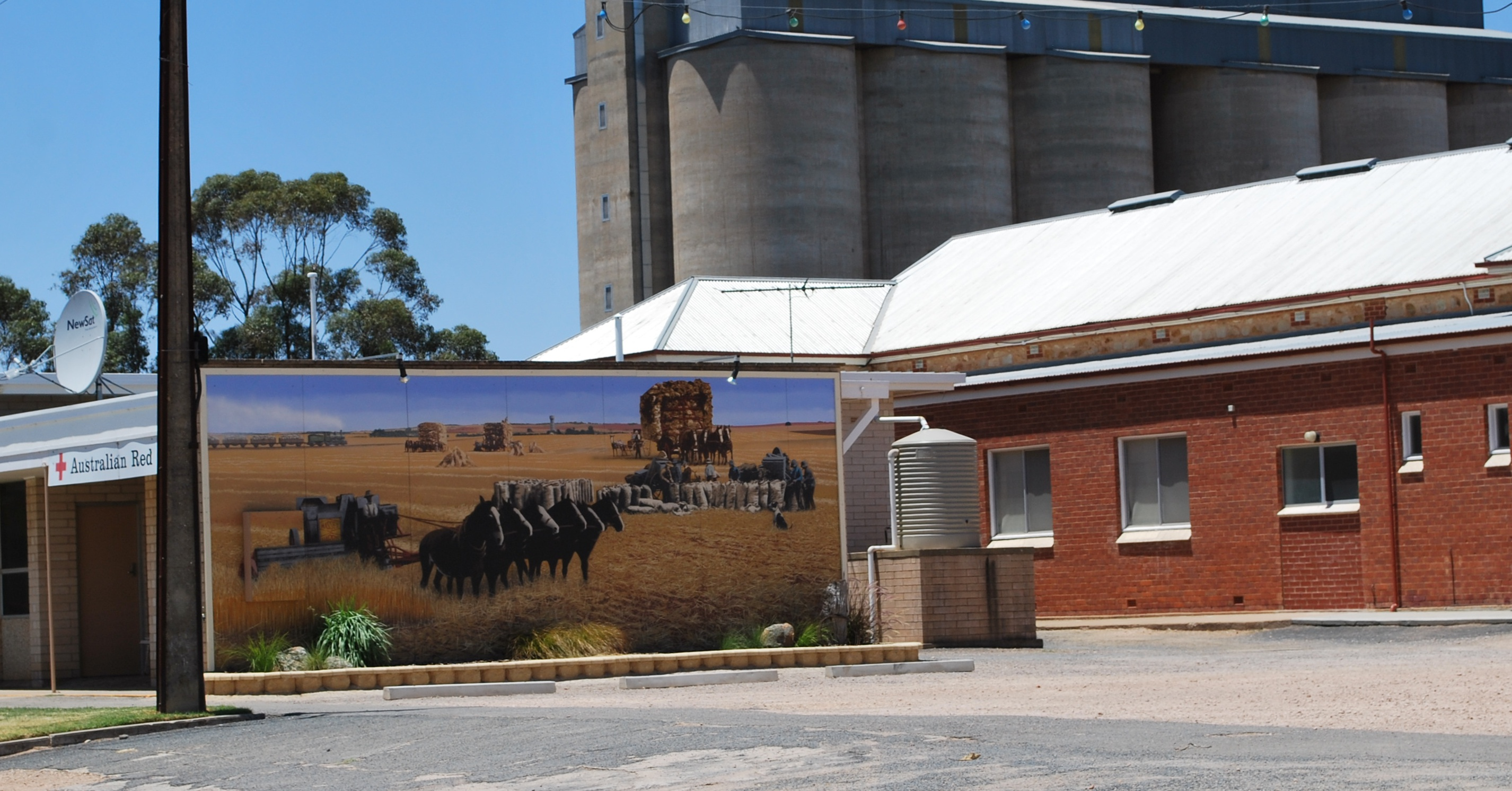
- Silos and harvest mural at Owen in the west of the hundred
- Country: Australia
- State: South Australia
- Region: Mid North
- Established: 22 May 1856

Area
  - Total: 280 km^{2} (109 sq mi)
- County: Gawler
Lands administrative divisions around Dalkey
Stow	Hall	Upper Wakefield
Balaklava	Dalkey	Alma
Dublin	Grace	Alma

The Hundred of Dalkey is a cadastral hundred located on the northern Adelaide Plains in South Australia, immediately south of the Wakefield River. It is one of the eight hundreds of the County of Gawler. It was named in 1856 by Governor Richard Graves MacDonnell for his hometown Dalkey, a seaside resort in Ireland.

The eastern outskirts of the township of Balaklava spills over the western boundary of the hundred (from the Hundred of Balaklava). Apart from the towns of Dalkey and east Balaklava, other localities within the hundred include: Owen, Stockyard Creek, Pinery and Hoskin Corner.

== Local government ==
The District Council of Dalkey was proclaimed incorporating the entirety of the hundred in March 1875 and existed until it merged with Alma Plains council in 1932 to form the District Council of Owen.

Following the 1983 merger of Owen council with the councils of Balaklava and Port Wakefield, the hundred of Dalkey was represented by the Owen and Balaklava wards in the new Wakefield Plains council.

Following the 1997 merger of Wakefield Plains council with Blyth Snowtown, the hundred of Dalkey was split between the Central and South wards of the new Wakefield Regional Council. Owen and Pinery became part of the South ward, and Dalkey, Erith and Hoskin Corner became part of the Central ward along with Balaklava.
