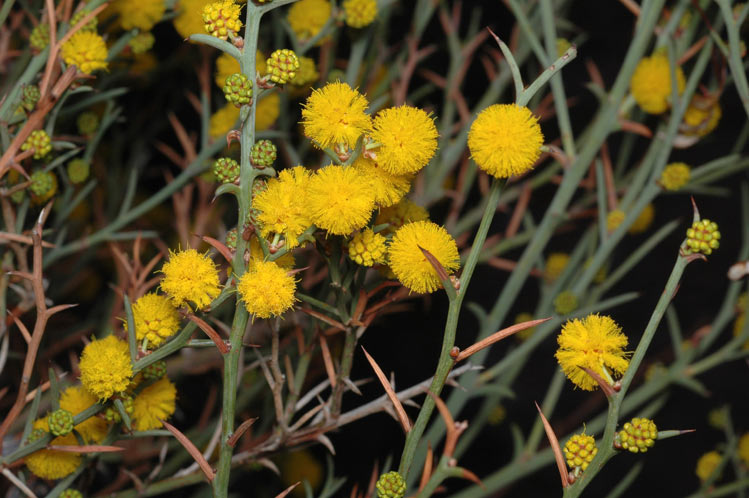
- In Mutawintji National Park

Scientific classification
- Kingdom: Plantae
- Clade: Tracheophytes
- Clade: Angiosperms
- Clade: Eudicots
- Clade: Rosids
- Order: Fabales
- Family: Fabaceae
- Subfamily: Caesalpinioideae
- Clade: Mimosoid clade
- Genus: Acacia
- Species: A. continua

Binomial name
- Acacia continua Benth.
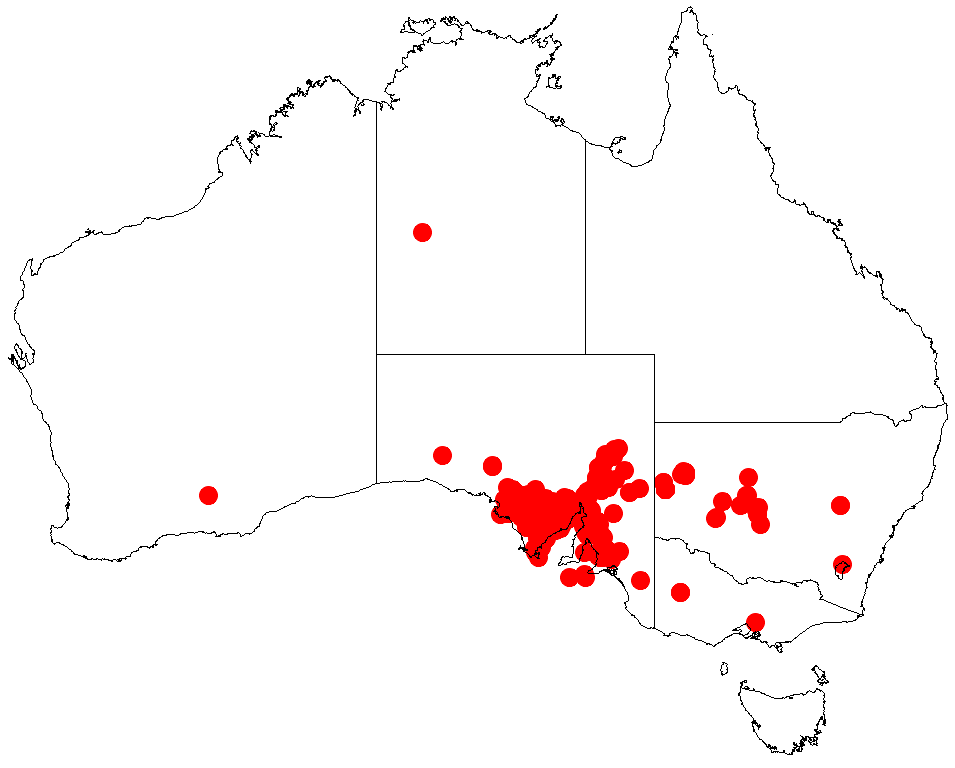
- Occurrence data from AVH

Synonyms
- Racosperma continuum (Benth.) Pedley; Acacia colletioides auct. non Benth.: Bentham, G. (May 1855); Acacia colletioides auct. non Benth.: Mueller, F.J.H. von (1863)

= Acacia continua =

Thorn wattle

Species of plant

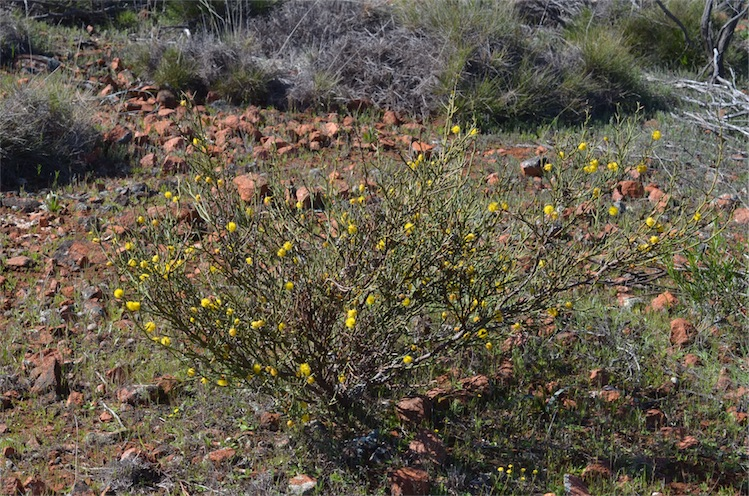
Habit in Gawler Ranges National Park

Acacia continua, commonly known as thorn wattle or thorny wattle, is a species of flowering plant in the family Fabaceae and is endemic to south-eastern continental Australia. It is an opening branching, rigid shrub with more or less terete, sharply pointed phyllodes that are continuous with the branchlets, spherical heads of golden yellow flowers and linear, curved to coiled, leathery pods.

== Description ==
Acacia continua is an openly-branched, rigid shrub that typically grows up to 2 m (6 ft 7 in) high and 0.7 m (2 ft 4 in) wide and has ribbed, glabrous branchlets. Its phyllodes are continuous with the branchlets, straight or with the ends turned down, 20–40 mm (0.79–1.57 in) long, 1.5–2 mm (0.059–0.079 in) in diameter and sharply pointed. The flowers are borne in one or two spherical heads in axils on a peduncle 2–6 mm (0.079–0.236 in) long with prominent dark brown bracts at the base. Each head is 6–10 mm (0.24–0.39 in) in diameter with about 30 golden yellow flowers. Flowering occurs from July to October, and the pods are linear, curved to once-coiled, constricted between and raised over the seeds, up to 80 mm (3.1 in) long and 3–4 mm (0.12–0.16 in) wide, leathery and glabrous. The seeds are elliptic, dull brown, 3–8 mm (0.12–0.31 in) long with a club-shaped aril.

== Taxonomy ==
Acacia continua was first formally described in 1864 George Bentham in his Flora Australiensis. The specific epithet is taken from the Latin word continua meaning uninterrupted, in reference to the phyllodes being continuous with the branchlets.

== Distribution and habitat ==
In New South Wales, A.continua is found in central and western parts on rocky ridges and watercourses in mallee and Callitris woodland. In South Australia the species often occurs on the Eyre Peninsula and Flinders and Mount Lofty Ranges, extending south to the coast. It is found growing on hard sandy alkaline or calcareous soils in open woodland, scrubland and Triodia grassland communities.

== See also ==
- List of Acacia species
