= Gawler River =

Gawler River may refer to:

- Gawler River (South Australia), a river in South Australia.
- Gawler River, South Australia, a town in South Australia.
- Gawler River (Tasmania), a river in Tasmania.

== See also ==
- Gawler (disambiguation)
