= Gawler Ranges Conservation Park =

Protected area in South Australia

- IUCN category VI (protected area with sustainable use of natural resources)
- Location within South Australia
- Location: South Australia
- Nearest city: Poochera
- Coordinates: 32.58°S 135.06°E
- Area: 154.80 km^{2} (59.77 sq mi)
- Established: 11 November 1993
- Governing body: Department for Environment and Water

Gawler Ranges Conservation Park (formerly the Gawler Ranges Conservation Reserve) is a protected area in the Australian state of South Australia on the Eyre Peninsula located about 28 kilometres (17 mi) north-west of the town centre in Poochera.

The conservation park is located to the south-west of the Gawler Ranges with the majority of its area being located within the gazetted locality of Bockelberg and with a smaller portion being located in the locality of Minnipa to the south.

The conservation park's name was originally approved by the Geographical Names Board as the Bockelberg Conservation Park but "due to legal processes", it was not constituted under the National Parks and Wildlife Act 1972 and was subsequently declared under the state's Crown Lands Act 1929 as the Gawler Ranges Conservation Reserve on 11 November 1993. Its name is derived from its “proximity” to the Gawler Ranges. As of 2006, it was intended that the conservation reserve would be incorporated in the Gawler Ranges National Park. It was eventually "redesignated" as the Gawler Ranges Conservation Park on 6 September 2012.

Flora found within the conservation park was described in 2001 as consisting of tree mallee dominated by red mallee (Eucalyptus oleosa) and gilja (Eucalyptus brachycalyx) with scattered patches of yorrell (Eucalyptus gracilis).

The conservation park is classified as an IUCN Category VI protected area.

== See also ==
- Protected areas of South Australia
- Gawler (disambiguation)
