= Hundred of Mudla Wirra =

Mudla Wirra
- Cadastral division
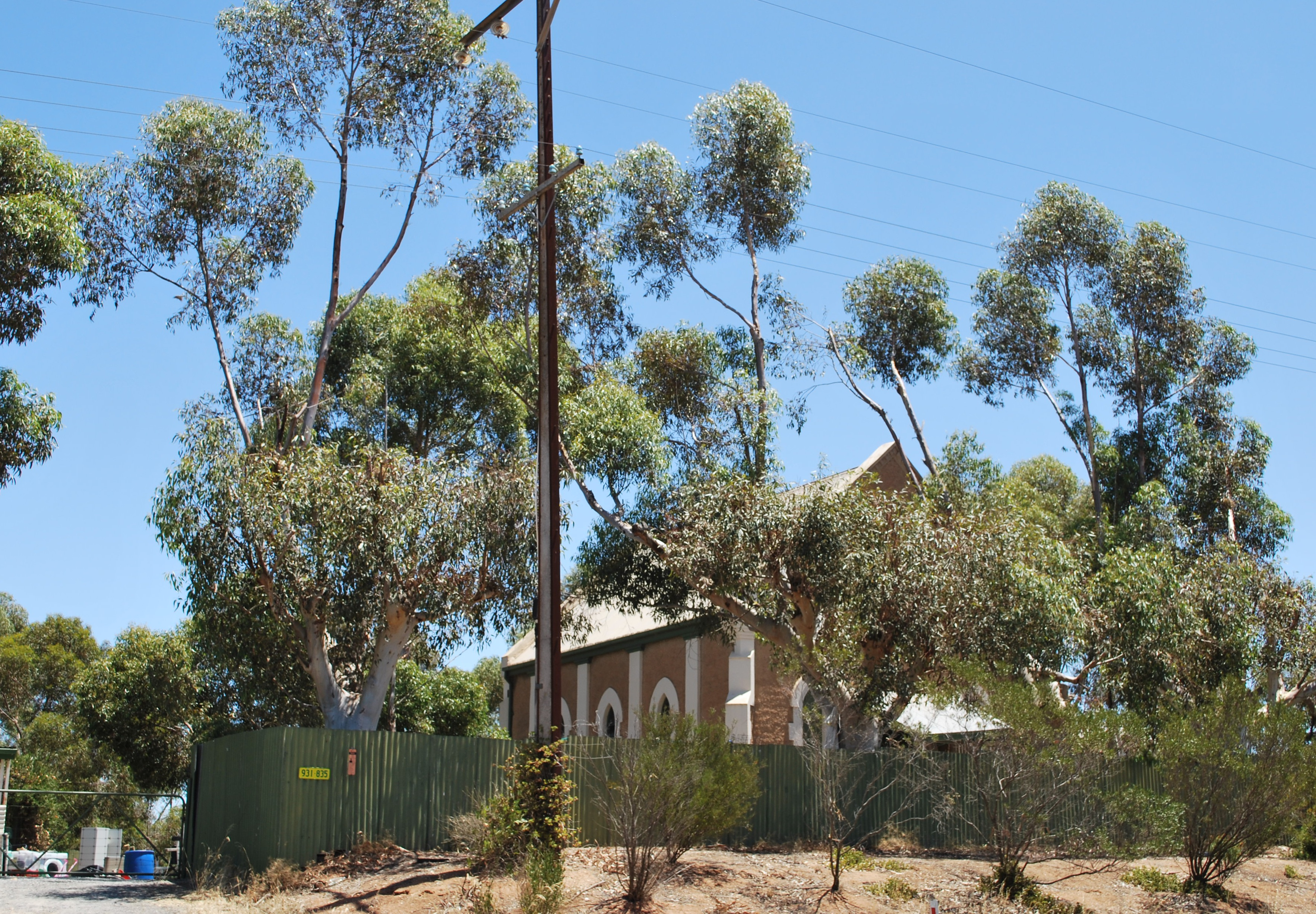
- Former church at Templers on the hundred's eastern boundary

- Coordinates: 34.501°S 138.690°E
- Country: Australia
- State: South Australia
- Region: Northern Adelaide Plains
- Established: 30 November 1847

Area
  - Total: 284 km^{2} (109.5 sq mi)
- County: Gawler
Lands administrative divisions around Mudla Wirra
Grace	Alma	Light
Gawler	Mudla Wirra	Nuriootpa
Munno Para	Munno Para	Barossa

The Hundred of Mudla Wirra is a cadastral unit of hundred located on the northern Adelaide Plains of South Australia, first proclaimed in 1847. The hundred is bounded on the north by the Light River and on the south by the Gawler River.

== History ==
The hundred was proclaimed on 29 November 1847 in the County of Gawler and named by Governor Frederick Robe, (at the same time as all the other Hundreds in Counties of Gawler, Light & Sturt were declared).

The name mudla wirra comes from the Kaurna language, but may have been misinterpreted in multiple sources, perhaps arising from the online version of Manning's Index. It has been reported that mudla means" implement", giving rise to the translation "a forest where implements are obtained", but in a newer publication (revised in 2012), Manning writes "Professor Tindale says that an alternative derivation is based on the word mudla meaning ‘nose’" (as in the Kaurna name for the Lefevre Peninsula, mudlanga), and other sources confirm this. Tindale and many others based their work on the work of German missionaries Teichelmann and Schürmann, who compiled a grammar and wordlist of the Kaurna language in 1840. In this work, mudla is recorded as meaning "nose", while mudli means implement.

== Local government ==
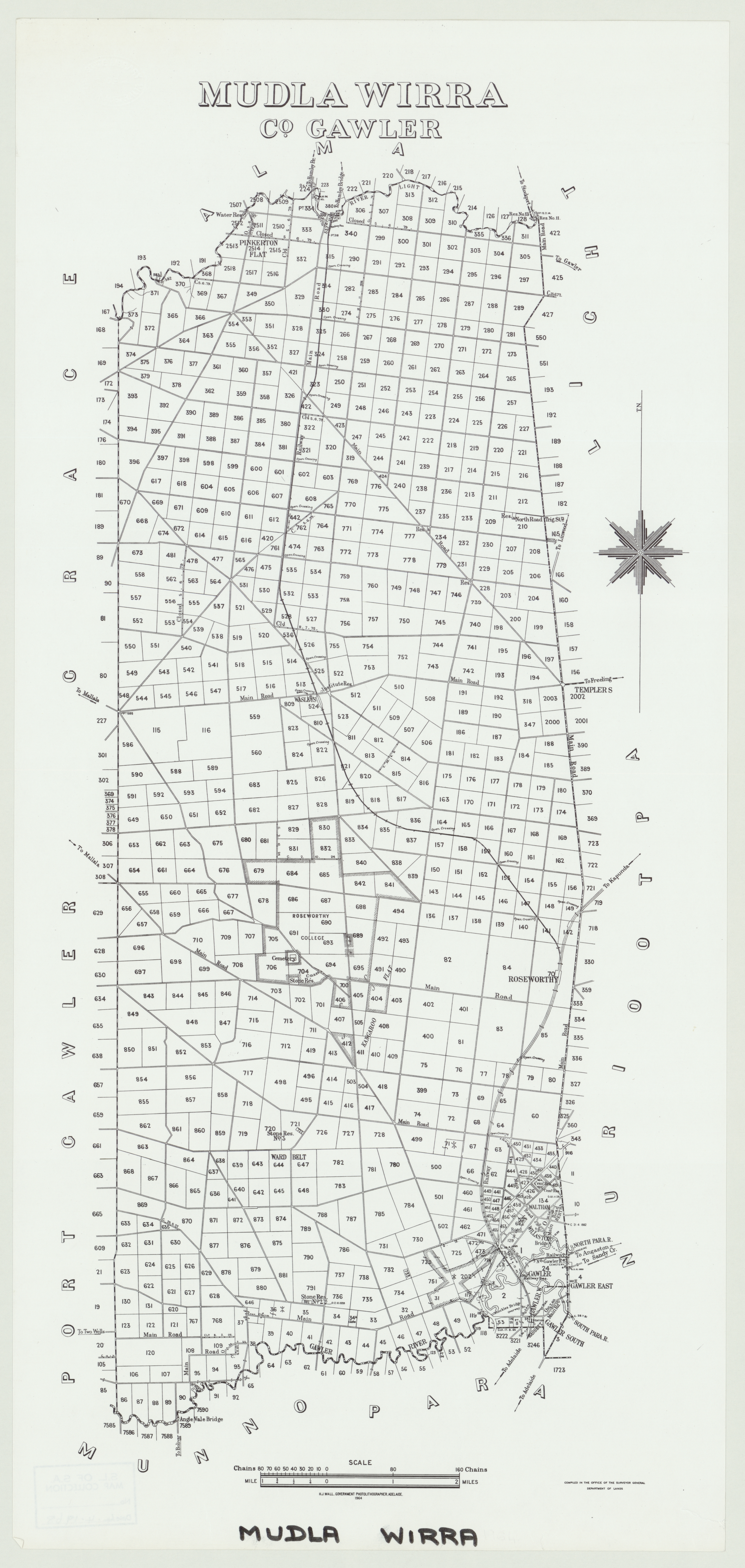
1964 cadastral map of the Hundred of Mudla Wirra

The first District Council of Mudla Wirra was established in 1854, bringing local government to the entire Hundred of Mudla Wirra and parts of the adjacent hundreds of Grace and Port Gawler. In 1856 the new District Council of Port Gawler assumed administration of those western parts outside the Hundred of Mudla Wirra. In 1857 the Town of Gawler was established at the south east corner of the hundred, annexing a small parts of Mudla Wirra.

In 1867 Mudla Wirra council split, horizontally, into the Mudla Wirra North and Mudla Wirra South, but the two were reunited as the second District Council of Mudla Wirra in 1933, bringing the hundred back under the administration of a single council body, apart from Gawler Town right at the south eastern fringe.

In 1977 the Mudla Wirra Council was amalgamated with the District Council of Freeling to form the District Council of Light. In 1996 the latter became a part of the much larger Light Regional Council, after combining with the District Council of Kapunda.

Being governed locally by the Light Regional Council since 1996, the hundred name has been preserved by being used for one of the council's four wards. The Mudla Wirra Ward covers the southern half of the hundred.

== Towns ==
Light Regional Council towns and localities in the hundred include: Hamley Bridge (south part), Linwood (west part), Magdala, Pinkerton Plains (east part), Woolsheds, Wasleys, Templers (west part), Reeves Plains (east part), Kangaroo Flat, Roseworthy (west part), Ward Belt, Gawler Belt, Gawler River and Buchfelde. Town of Gawler suburbs in the hundred include: Willaston, Reid, Gawler, Gawler West and Gawler South (west part).
