= Gawler (disambiguation) =

Gawler is a town in South Australia on the Gawler River. Gawler may also refer to:

== People ==
- Gawler (surname), people whose surname is Gawler
  - George Gawler (1795–1869), second Governor of South Australia

== Places ==
=== South Australia ===
- Gawler bioregion, a bioregion in South Australia
- Gawler craton, a geological formation in central South Australia
- Gawler Place, Adelaide, a street in the Adelaide city centre
- Gawler Ranges (disambiguation), places associated with the Gawler Ranges in South Australia
- Gawler River (South Australia) just north of the bounds of the Adelaide metropolitan area
  - Gawler River, South Australia, a small town on the north bank of the Gawler River
- Town of Gawler, local government area containing the town and suburbs

=== Tasmania ===
- Gawler, Tasmania, a suburb in the local government area of Central Coast Council (Tasmania)

== Railways ==
- Gawler railway line between Adelaide and the town of Gawler
  - Gawler Central railway station
  - Gawler Oval railway station
  - Gawler Racecourse railway station
  - Gawler railway station

== See also ==
- Gawler Bypass, road near the town of Gawler
- Gawler River (disambiguation)
- Port Gawler (disambiguation)
- Wheal Gawler, former mine in Mount Osmond, South Australia
