= Hundred of Port Gawler =

Port Gawler South Australia
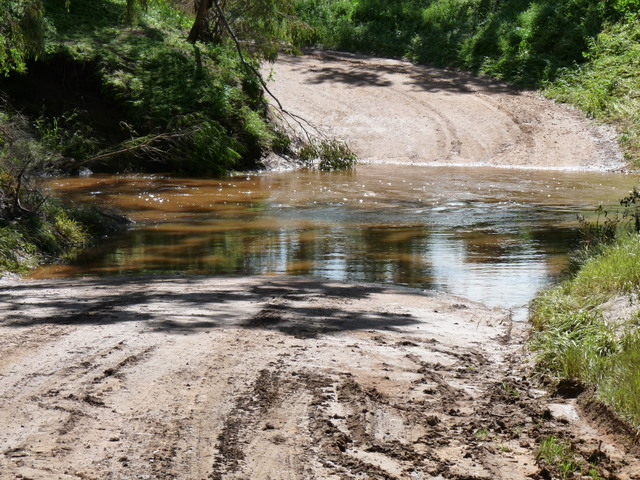
- Ford over Light River at Korunye

- Coordinates: 34°37′59″S 138°29′38″E
- Established: 7 August 1851
- County: Gawler
Lands administrative divisions around Port Gawler:
Dublin	Grace	Mudla Wirra
	Port Gawler	Mudla Wirra
	Port Adelaide	Munno Para

The Hundred of Port Gawler is a cadastral unit of hundred located on the central Adelaide Plains in South Australia and bounded on the south by the Gawler River. It is centred on the town of Two Wells with the locality of Port Gawler at the south western corner of its boundary. It is one of the eight hundreds of the County of Gawler. It was named in 1851 by Governor Henry Young either directly or indirectly after the former Governor George Gawler.

The following localities and towns of the Adelaide Plains Council area are situated inside (or largely inside) the bounds of the Hundred of Port Gawler:

- Port Gawler
- Two Wells
- Lewiston
- Middle Beach
- Lower Light (most part)
- Korunye (most part)
- Reeves Plains (most part)

== Local government ==
The first local government body established in the area was the District Council of Mudla Wirra, proclaimed in 1854. Mudla Wirra council encompassed those parts of the Hundred of Port Gawler and Hundred of Grace south of the River Light as well as all of the Hundred of Mudla Wirra. In 1856 those parts in the hundreds of Grace and Port Gawler seceded to form the District Council of Port Gawler.

North of the River Light it was not until 1873 that local government was formed by the establishment of the District Council of Dublin which encompassed both the Hundred of Dublin and that unincorporated north western part of the Hundred of Port Gawler.

In 1935 Port Gawler council amalgamated with Dublin and Grace councils to form the District Council of Mallala (initially called District Council of Light, much later called Adelaide Plains Council). This brought the entire hundred under the local governance of a single council body.

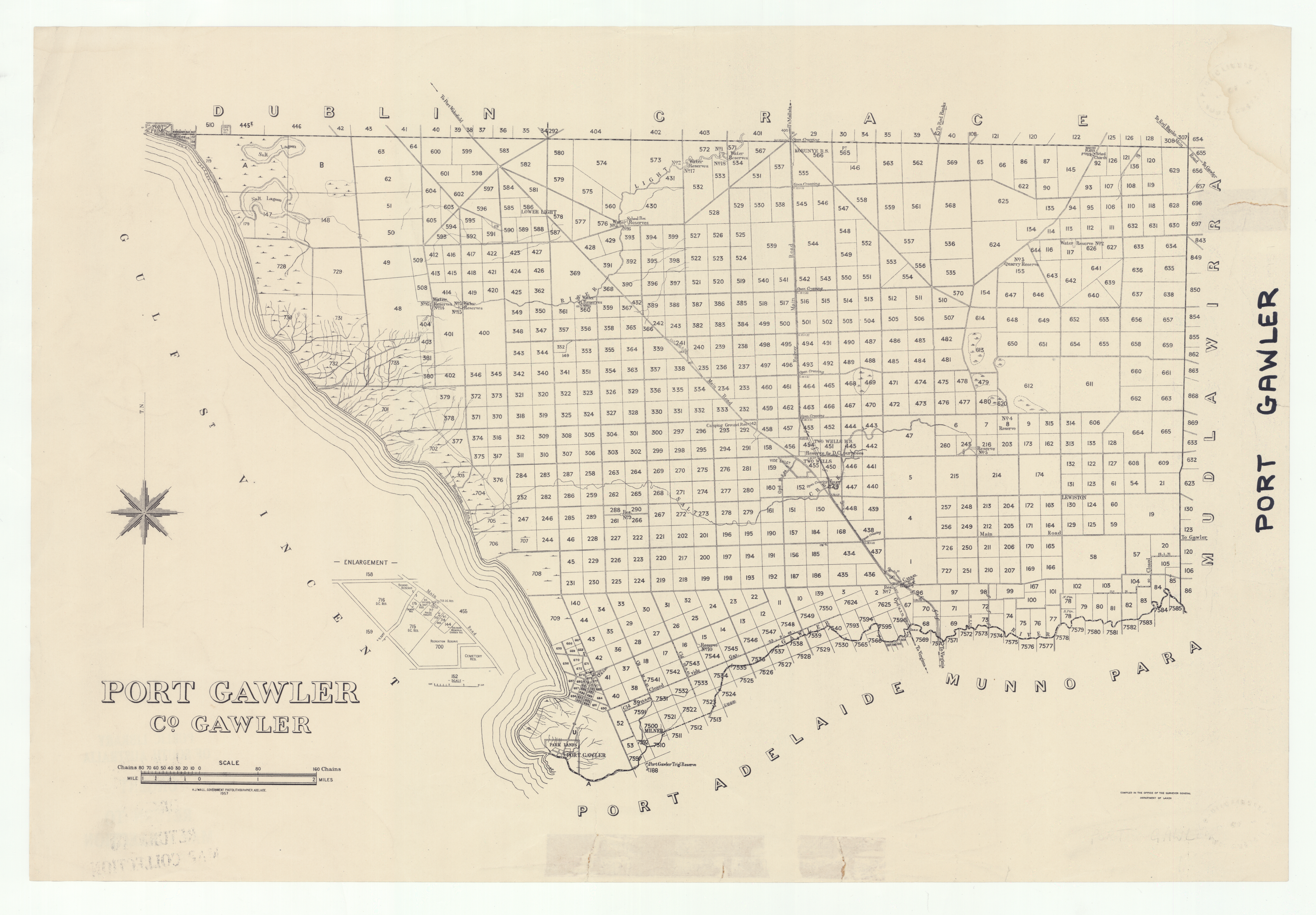
Hundred of Port Gawler, 1957

== See also ==
- Gawler River (South Australia)
- Lands administrative divisions of South Australia
