= Hundred of Grace =

Grace
- Cadastral division
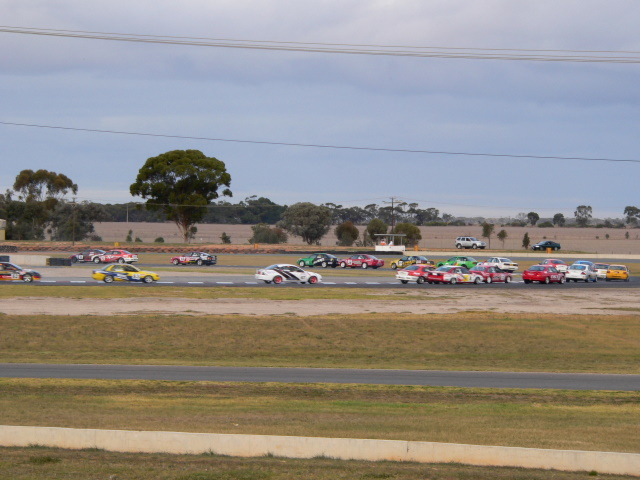
- Mallala Motor Sport Park in the north of the hundred

- Coordinates: 34.424°S 138.527°E
- Country: Australia
- State: South Australia
- Region: Northern Adelaide Plains
- Established: 22 May 1856

Area
  - Total: 320 km^{2} (123 sq mi)
- County: Gawler
Lands administrative divisions around Grace
Balaklava	Dalkey	Alma
Dublin	Grace	Mudla Wirra
Port Gawler	Port Gawler	Mudla Wirra

The Hundred of Grace is a cadastral unit of hundred located on the northern Adelaide Plains of South Australia spanning the township of Mallala and the Grace Plains. The hundred was proclaimed in 1856 in the County of Gawler and named by Governor Richard Graves MacDonnell after Grace Montgomery Farrell, wife of James Farrell, Dean of Adelaide. The hundred spans a significant portion of the lower Light River, which flows from north east to south west through the area.

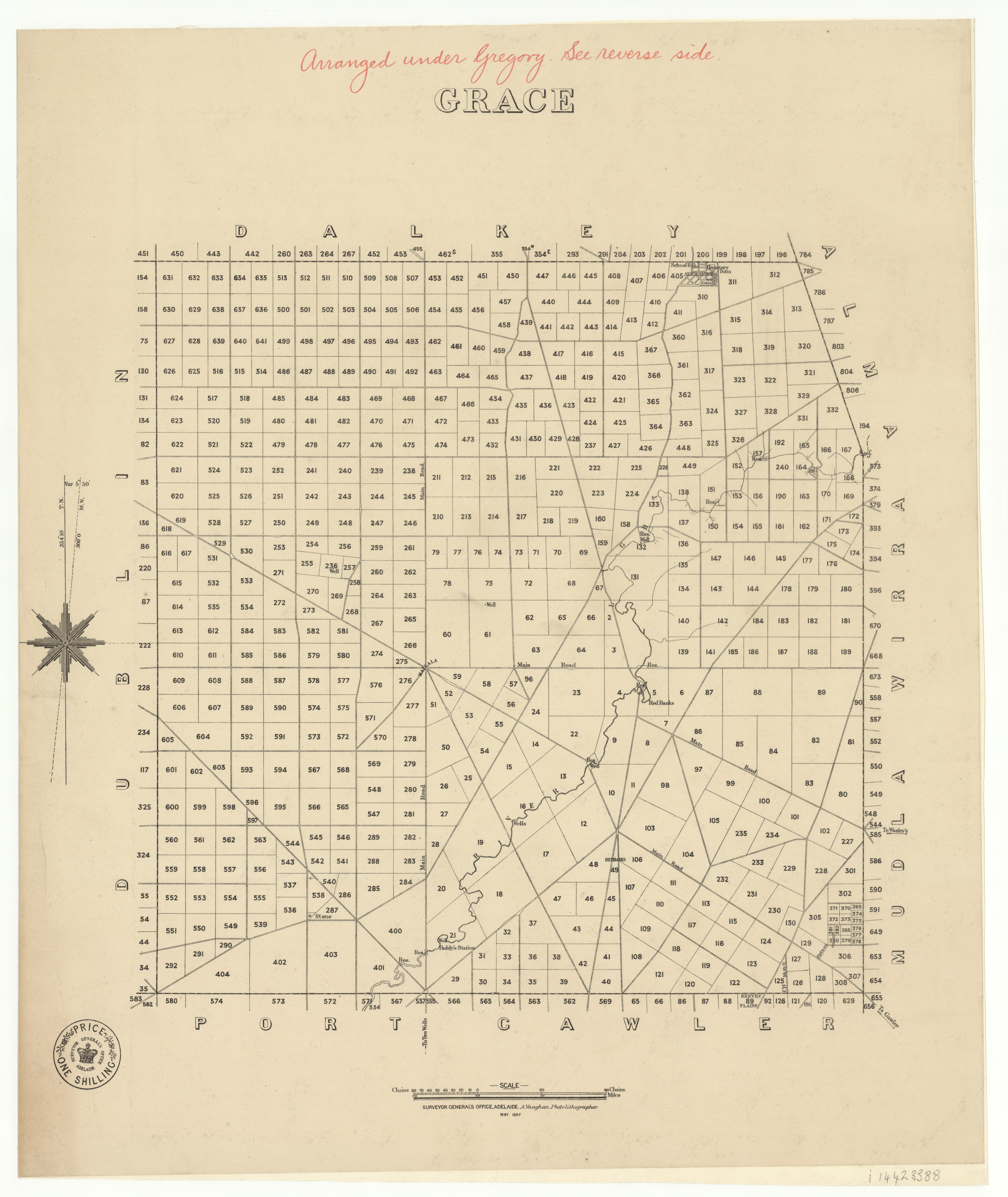
Plan of the Hundred of Grace, 1897

Apart from Mallala, the hundred includes the localities of Redbanks, Fischer, Barabba, Pinkerton Plains (most part) and Grace Plains (most part). The localities of Reeves Plains, Korunye and Lower Light cross over the southern border of the hundred.

== Local government ==
The District Council of Mudla Wirra was the first local government body established in the area. It was proclaimed in January 1854 and administered all of the county south of the Light River, including approximately the south eastern third of the Hundred of Grace. Less than three years later, in September 1856, the District Council of Port Gawler was established by secession from Mudla Wirra including the portion within the Hundred of Grace. In 1874, the District Council of Grace was established to administer the remainder of the hundred.

On 1 May 1935, the entire hundred came to be administered by a single local government body when Grace and Port Gawler councils were amalgamated with the District Council of Dublin (to the west) to create the new District Council of Light, subsequently renamed District Council of Mallala in 1937, and then Adelaide Plains Council in 2016.
