= District Council of Hall =

District Council of Hall South Australia
- Coordinates: 34°05′08″S 138°30′54″E
- Established: 1878
- Abolished: 1935
- Council seat: Halbury
LGAs around District Council of Hall:
Snowtown; Blyth	Blyth	Clare; Upper Wakefield
Balaklava	District Council of Hall	Upper Wakefield
Balaklava	Dalkey; Owen	Alma Plains; Owen

The District Council of Hall was a local government area in South Australia from 1878 to 1935.

== History ==
The District Council of Hall was officially proclaimed on 14 November 1878 as constituting the entire Hundred of Hall. It was divided into five wards:

- Hoyleton, centred on the township of Hoyleton in the north east of the hundred
- Halbury, centred on the township of Halbury in the centre of the hundred
- Wakefield, in the south of the hundred beside the Wakefield River
- Woodlands, centred on the locality of Woodlands in the north west of the hundred
- Watchman's Plains, centred on the locality of Watchman at Watchman's Plain in the west of the hundred

In 1911 a part of the western ward of Watchman's Plains was severed from the Hall council and annexed by the District Council of Balaklava.

From 1930 to 1934, the local government commission appointed under the Local Government Areas Re-arrangement Act, 1929, had proposed several recommendations on amalgamating the district of Hall. Despite being consistently opposed by residents of Hall, the commission declared in 1934 that the Hall district would be amalgamated with the councils of Blyth and Balaklava. On 21 March 1935 it was promulgated that, effective 1 May 1935, the Hoyleton and Woodlands wards in the north would go to Blyth and be known there as the new ward of Hoyleton, and that the remainder would go to Balaklava and constitute the new wards of Halbury and Wakefield.

== Neighbouring local government ==
The following adjacent local government bodies co-existed with the Hall council:

- District Council of Blyth (established in 1872) lay immediately north and north west.
- District Council of Clare (established in 1853) and the District Council of Upper Wakefield lay north east.
- District Council of Upper Wakefield (established 1854) lay immediately east.
- District Council of Alma Plains (established 1870) lay south east across the Wakefield River until it became part of District Council of Owen in 1932.
- District Council of Dalkey (established 1875) lay immediately south across the Wakefield River until it became part of Owen council in 1932.
- District Council of Balaklava (established 1877) lay west and south west.
- District Council of Snowtown (established 1888) lay north west from 1889 when the Hundred of Everard was severed from Blyth council and annexed by Snowtown.
