= Buckland Park, South Australia =

Buckland Park
- Suburb
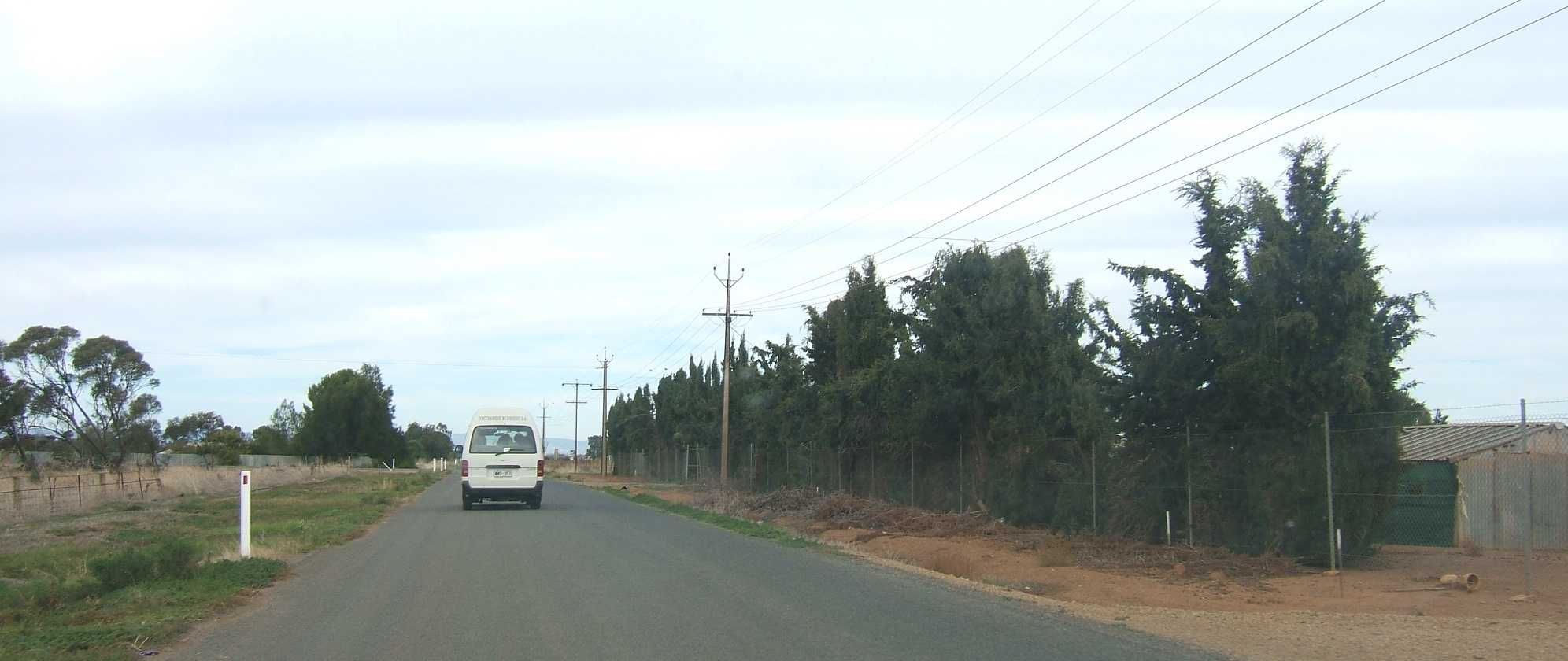
- Street in Buckland Park

- Interactive map of Buckland Park
- Coordinates: 34.68382°S 138.51192°E
- Country: Australia
- State: South Australia
- City: Adelaide
- LGA: City of Playford
- Location: 30 km (19 mi) N of Adelaide city centre

Government
  - State electorate: Taylor
  - Federal division: Spence

Population
  - Total: 99 (SAL 2021)
- Postcode: 5120
Suburbs around Buckland Park
Port Gawler	Two Wells	Riverlea Park
Gulf St Vincent	Buckland Park	Virginia
	St Kilda	Waterloo Corner

Buckland Park is a suburb on the northern rural outskirts of Adelaide, the capital city of South Australia. Port Wakefield Road, the main highway north from Adelaide, passes the eastern boundary. The northern boundary is the Gawler River, and the western side is Gulf St Vincent. Buckland Park is named after an early pioneer homestead in the area.

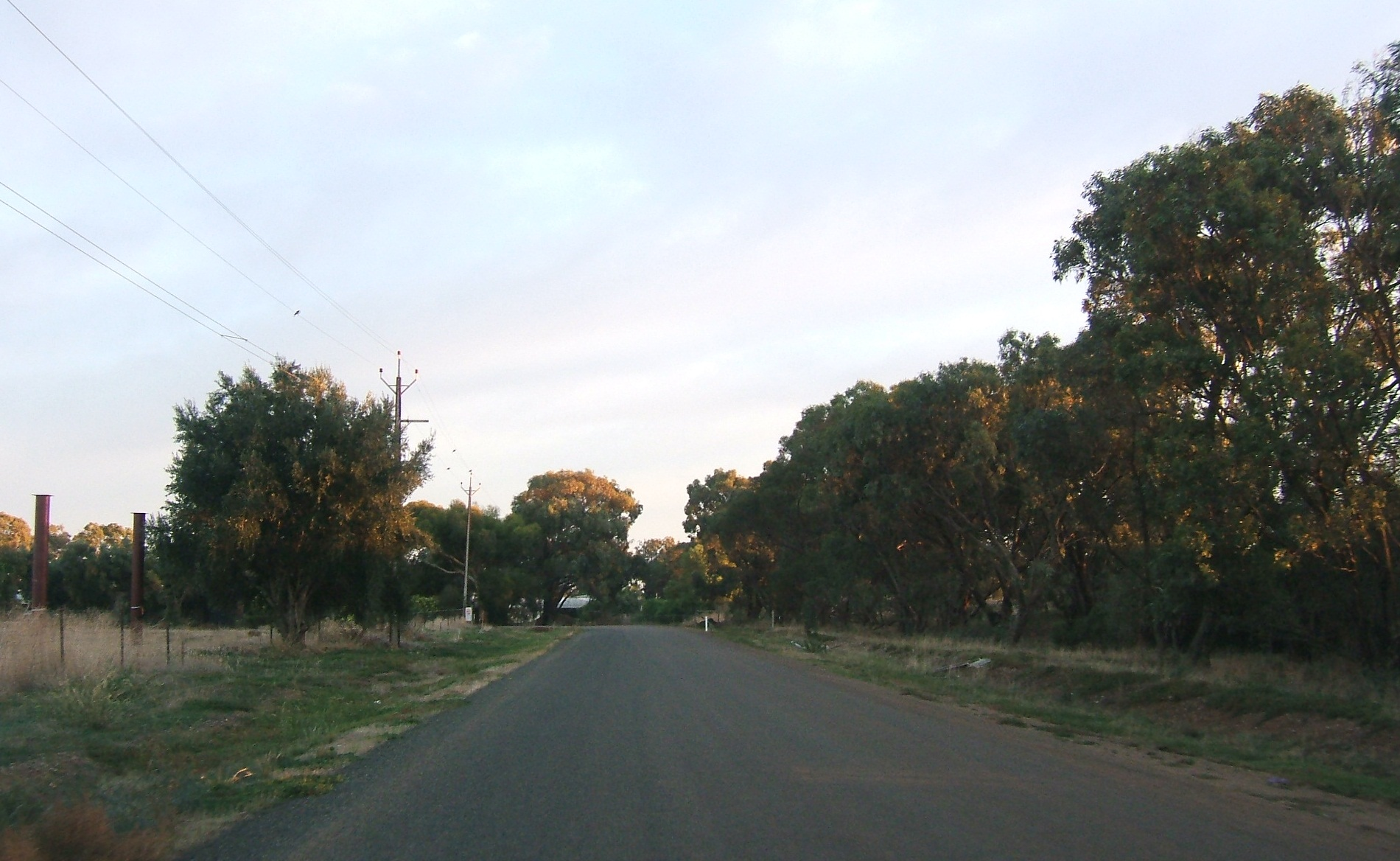
Street in Buckland Park

== Industry ==
Market gardening is the main activity as the soil is predominantly on the flood plain of the lower Gawler River. Buckland Park is one of the sites of the Adelaide region weather radar.

== Housing development ==
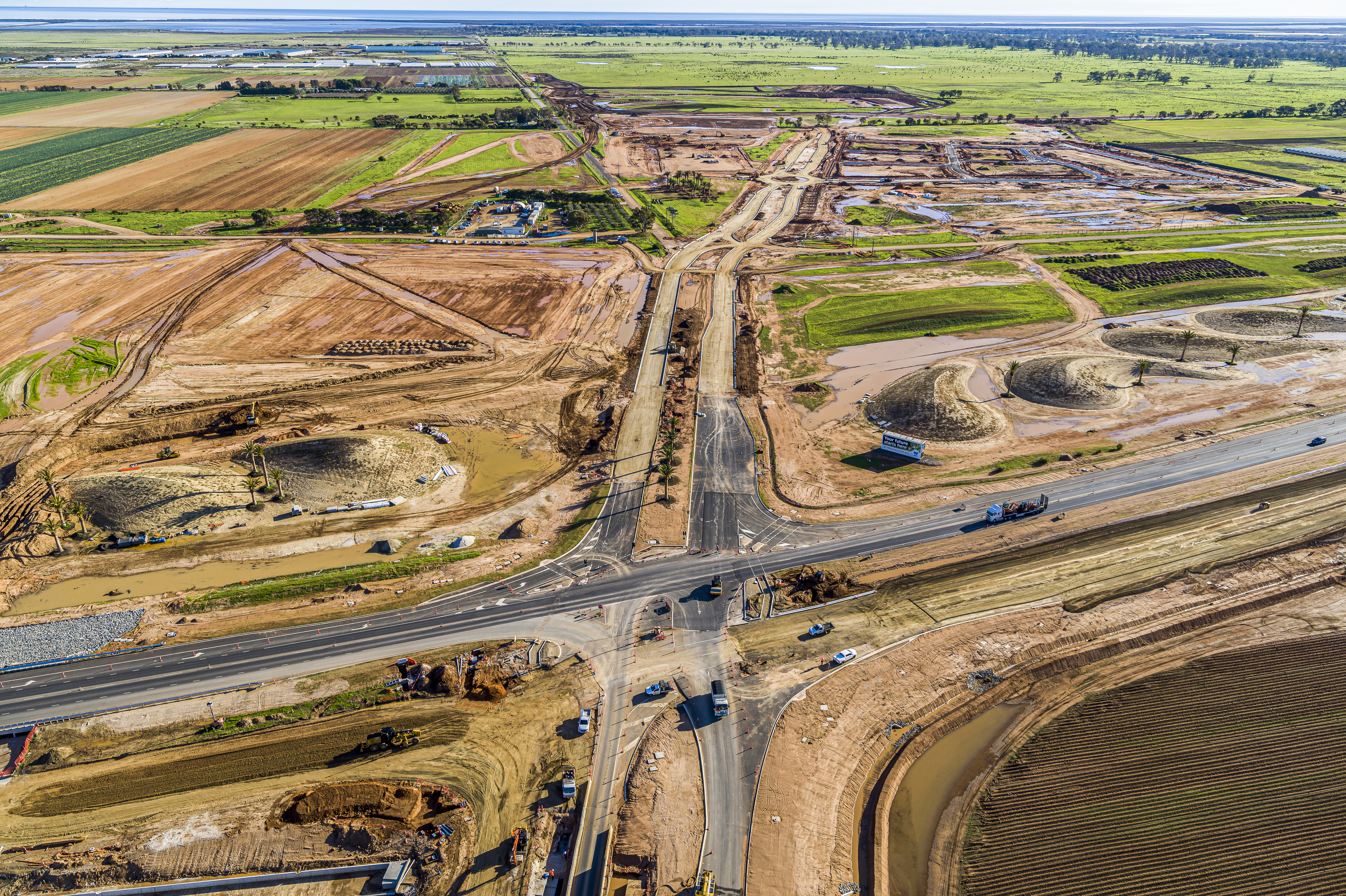
Construction of Riverlea Masterplanned Community in Buckland Park

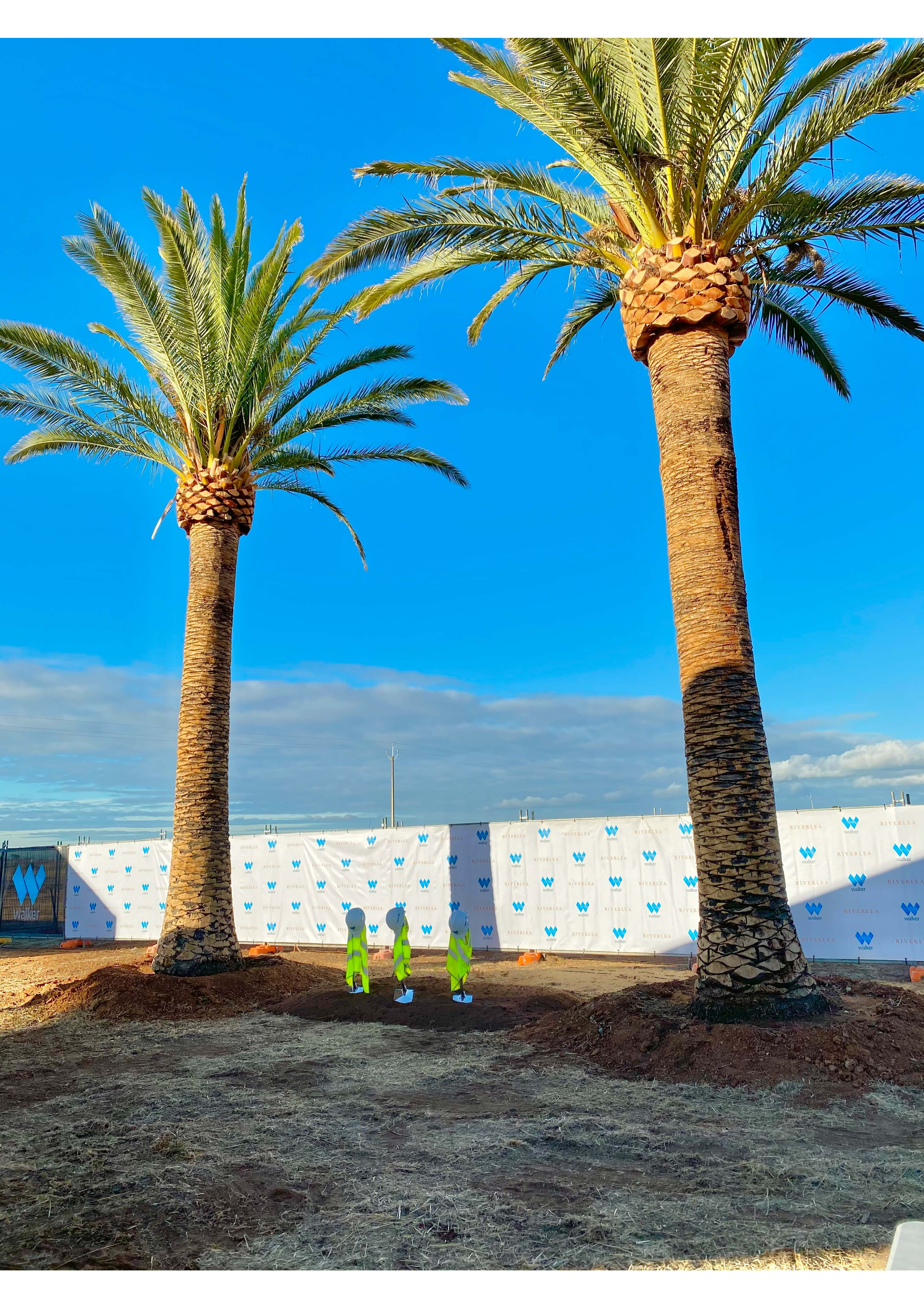
Groundbreaking event at the Riverlea Masterplanned Community

There is some construction taking place here. Walker Corporation proposed to develop a large housing development in the area with up to 33,000 residents by 2036, however some critics are concerned about the isolation from the rest of Adelaide and the threat of flooding. The project was first supported by the state government in 2007. In 2019, the approval was extended again, with a requirement to commence substantial work on the site by October 2021. Construction on the development officially began on 26 February 2021, with the first land settlements anticipated to occur by the end of September 2021.

On 24 February 2022, the urban development was cut out of the rural locality and named Riverlea Park.
