= County of Gawler =

Gawler South Australia
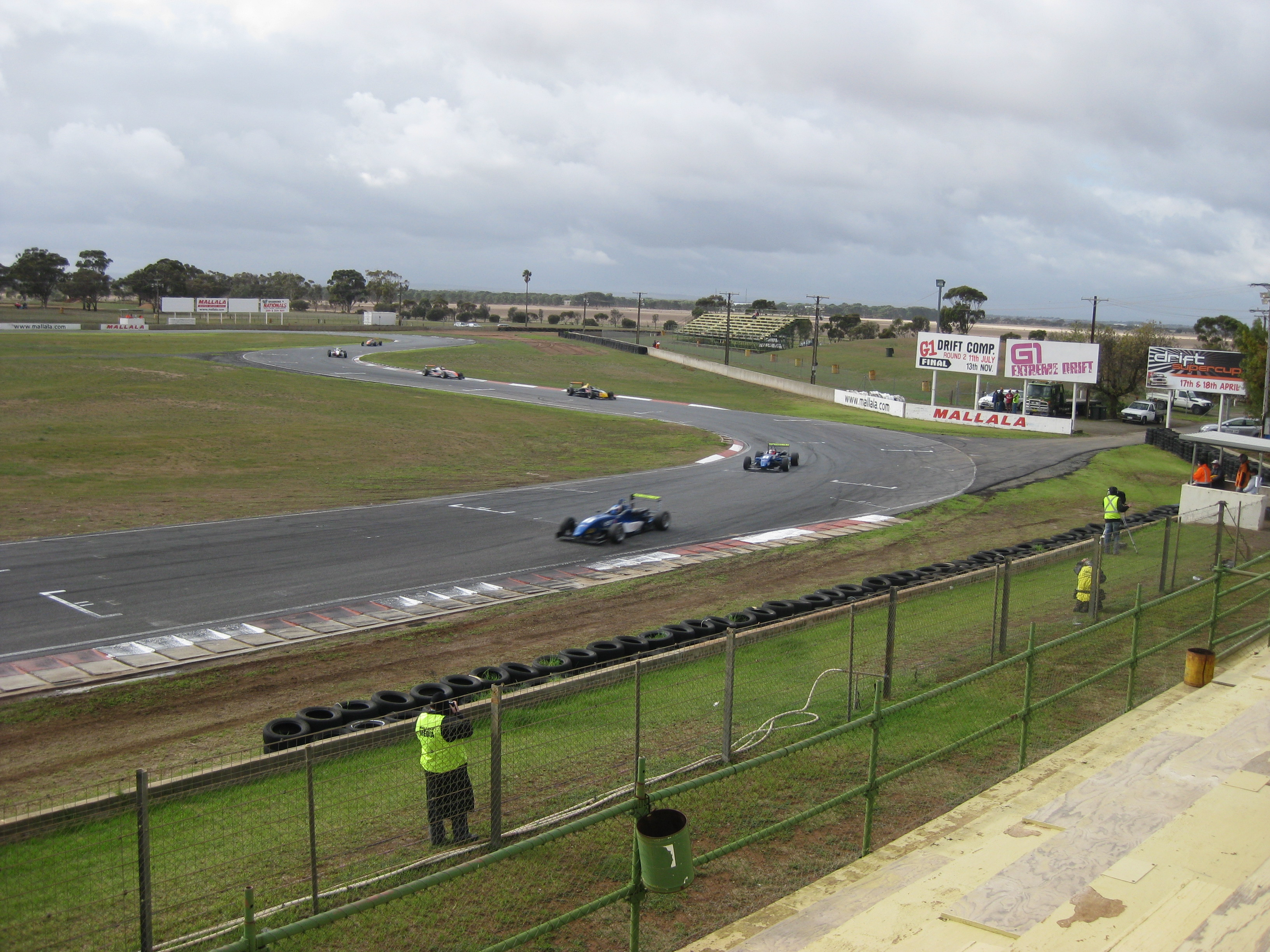
- Mallala Motor Sport Park at Mallala in the Hundred of Grace

- Coordinates: 34.37°S 138.49°E
- Established: 1842
- Area: 2,404 km^{2} (928.2 sq mi)
- LGA(s): Adelaide Plains Council; Wakefield Regional Council; Light Regional Council
Lands administrative divisions around Gawler:
Daly	Stanley	Burra
Fergusson	Gawler	Light
Gulf St Vincent	Adelaide	Adelaide

The County of Gawler is one of the 49 cadastral counties of South Australia. It was proclaimed in 1842 by Governor George Grey and named for the former Governor George Gawler. It is bounded by the Wakefield River in the north, Gulf St Vincent in the west, the approximate path of Horrocks Highway in the east, and the Gawler River in the south.

== Hundreds ==
The County of Gawler is divided into the following hundreds:

- In the north of the county, from east to west, the Hundred of Alma, Hundred of Dalkey, Hundred of Balaklava and Hundred of Inkerman lie on the south bank of the Wakefield River, spanning from Undalya to the river mouth at Port Wakefield.
- In the centre of the county the Hundred of Dublin lies west, on the coast of Gulf St Vincent, and the Hundred of Grace lies at the centre, spanning a significant portion of the lower Light River.
- In the south west and south east of the county, respectively, the Hundred of Port Gawler and Hundred of Mudla Wirra lie on the north bank of the Gawler River.
