= District Council of Upper Wakefield =

District Council of Upper Wakefield South Australia
- Coordinates: 34°01′38″S 138°41′08″E
- Established: 19 October 1854
- Abolished: 5 July 1970
- Council seat: Auburn
- State electorate(s): Burra and Clare (1854–1862); Stanley (1862–1875); Wooroora (1875–1938)
LGAs around District Council of Upper Wakefield:
| Blyth | Clare | Clare |
| Hall; Blyth | Upper Wakefield | Stanley; Saddleworth |
| Dalkey; Balaklava | Rhynie; Alma Plains | Saddleworth |

The District Council of Upper Wakefield was a local government area in South Australia centred on the town of Auburn from 1854 until 1970.

== History ==
The District Council of Upper Wakefield was proclaimed on 19 October 1854 by secession of the Hundred of Upper Wakefield from the District Council of Clare, which had been established in the preceding year.

In 1970 the council amalgamated with the District Council of Saddleworth to form the District Council of Saddleworth and Auburn.

== Chairs ==
Incomplete list:

- Joseph Stear Cole (1854–?)
- James English (c1883–?)
- J. J. Duncan
- J. Robertson (1901–1904)
- J. G. Williams (1904–?)
- E. W. Castine (1907)
- D. Garrett (1907–Sep 1922)
- G. W. Parker (1922–1923)
- B. H. Roberts (1924–1933)
- G. W. Williams (1934–1935)
