= Gawler (surname) =

Gawler is a surname, and may refer to:

- George Gawler (1795–1869), governor of South Australia;
- Henry Gawler (1766–1852), English barrister;
- Henry Gawler (lawyer) (1827–1894), son of George Gawler, later returned to South Australia as a lawyer;
- Ian Gawler (born 1950), Australian author;
- John Bellenden Ker Gawler (c.1764–1842), English botanist;
- John Cox Gawler (1830–1882), British Israelite author.
