= District Council of Alma Plains =

- Local government area
- Coordinates: 34°20′04″S 138°43′55″E
- Country: Australia
- State: South Australia
- Established: 1870
- Abolished: 1932
- Council seat: Alma
LGAs around District Council of Alma Plains
Hall; Balaklava	Upper Wakefield	Saddleworth
Dalkey	District Council of Alma Plains	Rhynie
Grace	Stockport	Stockport

The District Council of Alma Plains was a local government area in South Australia seated at Alma from 1870 to 1932.

== History ==
The District Council of Alma Plains was proclaimed on 8 December 1870 in spite of opposition from Stockport and Rhynie council members representing the interests of ratepayers in those townships west of the Alma Range ridge line. The new district enclosed the west of the Hundred of Alma and was carved from north west of Stockport district and west of Rhynie district, with the new eastern boundary of Alma Plains lying approximately on the ridge line of the Alma Range. The inaugural councillors were John Laurie, David Smyth, James Day, John Connell, and Gavin Freebairn.

The Alma Plains council ceased to exist in 1932 when it was amalgamated with the District Council of Dalkey to form the new District Council of Owen. The old Dalkey council seat was retained at Owen.
