= James Gilbert Woolcock =

James Gilbert Woolcock (7 November 1874 – 14 March 1957) was an Australian company director, metallurgist, mining consultant, mining engineer and public servant.

== Early life ==
James Woolcock was born on 7 November 1874 in Alma, South Australia, the third of ten children. His father was Cornwall schoolmaster Richard Woolcock and his mother was South Australian-born Caroline (née Bottrill). Woolcock attended the Adelaide-based Unley High School and the South Australian School of Mines and Industries. In 1894, he was employed by the Department of Mines and was soon appointed battery manager of the state's gold treatment plant in Mount Torrens in the Adelaide Hills. He resigned from his job in November 1898 and moved back to Adelaide.

== Career ==
Woolcock began mining for gold in Victoria and found a job as an essayer on the Princess Royal mine in Norseman, Western Australia, while managing two other small mines in Tarcoola and Deloraine. He was also the director of mining company South Australian Barytes Limited from 1946 to 1957, and oversaw the development of its mine and treatment plant in Blinman and Quorn respectively.

== Personal life and death ==
Woolcock married Jane Johnston on 13 September 1899 at the Christian Chapel in Norwood. They had four sons. Johnston died in 1838, after which Woolcock moved to Reynella, where he died on 14 March 1857. He was buried at the Mitcham cemetery in Adelaide.

== See also ==
- Edward Henry Rennie
- Francis James Gillen
- Henry Yorke Lyell Brown
