= District Council of Dublin =

District Council of Dublin South Australia
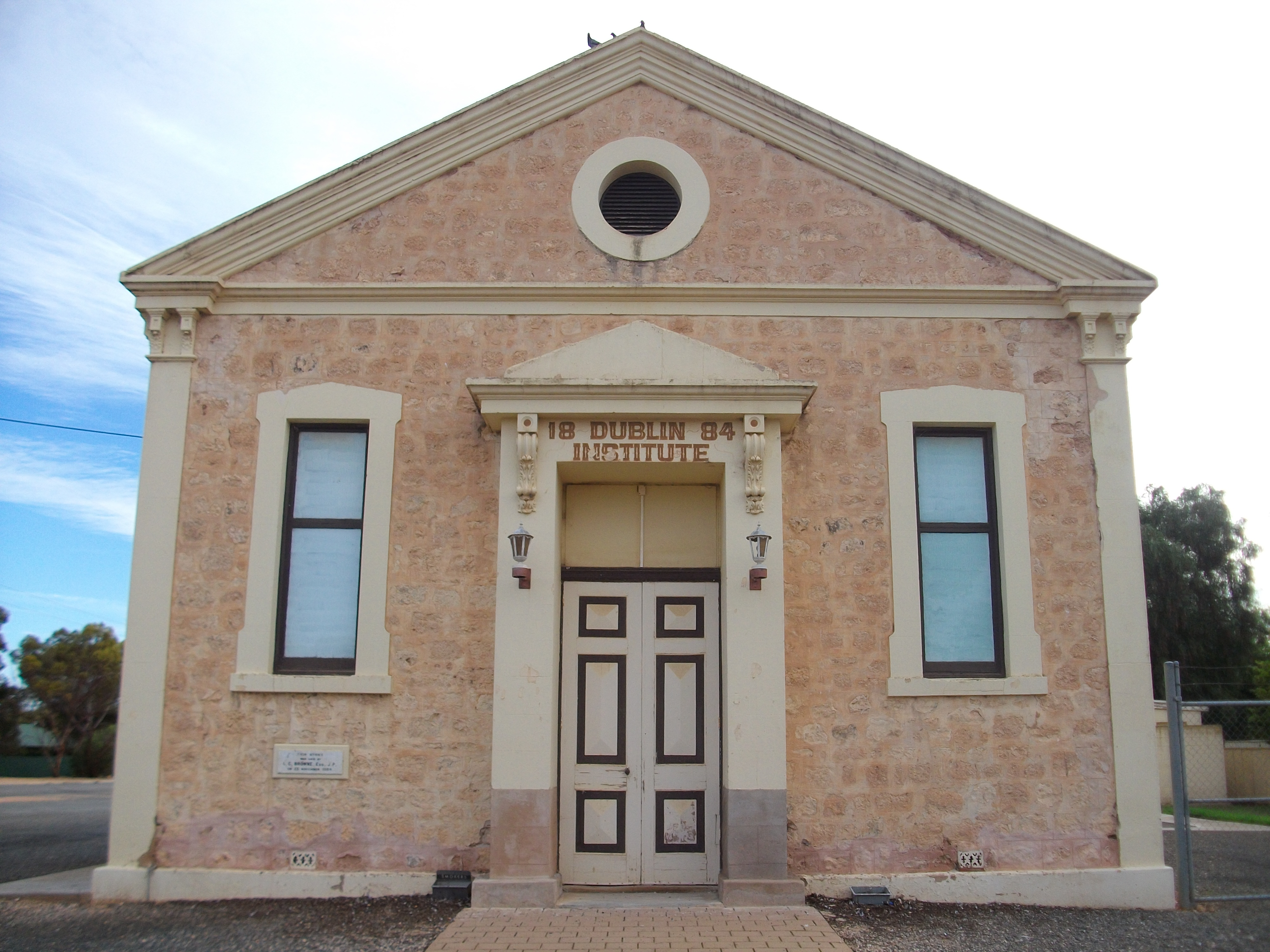
- Dublin Institute, built 1884

- Coordinates: 34°27′07″S 138°20′54″E
- Established: 1873
- Abolished: 1935
- Council seat: Dublin
LGAs around District Council of Dublin:
Port Wakefield	Balaklava	Dakley
	District Council of Dublin	Grace
	Port Gawler	Port Gawler

The District Council of Dublin was a local government area in South Australia from 1873 to 1935, seated at Dublin.

== History ==
The council was proclaimed on 27 November 1873. Its jurisdiction consisted of the whole Hundred of Dublin as well as that portion of the Hundred of Port Gawler north of the River Light. The inaugural councillors in 1873 were proclaimed as Noble Johnson, Weatherall Lindsay, William Wilson, John Lines, Richard J Loveday, and George Arnold.

On 1 May 1935, it was amalgamated with the district councils of Port Gawler (to the south) and Grace (to the east) to create the District Council of Light. The new district council was subsequently renamed as the District Council of Mallala in 1937 and again as the Adelaide Plains Council in 2016.

== Chairmen ==
The following persons were elected to serve as chairman of the district council for the following terms:

- Not known 1873-75
- R.J. Loveday 1875-76
- N. J. W. Lindsay 1876-77
- J. Porter 1877-80
- W. Simmons 1880-82
- N. J. W. Lindsay 1882-84
- H. White 184-87
- F. Diment 1887-88
- W. Chapman 1888-90
- W.H. Baker 1890-92
- G.M. Johnson 1892-94
- W.H. Baker 1894-98
- D. Parker 1898-99
- W.H. Baker 1899-1907
