= District Council of Dalkey =

- Local government area
- Coordinates: 34°15′38″S 138°30′00″E
- Country: Australia
- State: South Australia
- Established: 1875
- Abolished: 1932
- Council seat: Owen

Area
  - Total: 280 km^{2} (110 sq mi)
LGAs around District Council of Dalkey
Balaklava	Hall	Upper Wakefield
Balaklava	District Council of Dalkey	Rhynie; Alma Plains
Dublin	Grace	Stockport; Alma Plains

The District Council of Dalkey was a local government area seated at Owen in South Australia from 1875 to 1932.

== History ==
The District Council of Dalkey was officially proclaimed as incorporating the entire Hundred of Dalkey on 25 March 1875. The five inaugural councillors appointed on the date of the proclamation were John Fisher, Edward George Gibbs, Isaiah Hill, Richard Keane Spotswood, and Gottlieb Trager.

In 1882 a council chamber was opened for the Dalkey council in Owen.

The Dalkey council ceased to exist in 1932 when it was amalgamated with the District Council of Alma Plains to form the new District Council of Owen, but the new council seat was kept at Owen.

== Neighbouring local government ==
The following adjacent local government bodies co-existed with the Dalkey council:

- District Council of Hall lay immediately north across the Wakefield River from its establishment in 1878.
- District Council of Upper Wakefield (established 1854) lay north east across the Wakefield River .
- District Council of Rhynie (established 1866) lay immediately east until the creation of Alma Plains council in 1870.
- District Council of Stockport (established 1865) lay south east until the creation of Alma Plains council in 1870.
- District Council of Grace (established 1874) lay immediately south and south east.
- District Council of Dublin (established 1873) lay south west.
- District Council of Balaklava lay immediately west from its establishment in 1877, and north west from Balaklava's annexation of the Hundred of Stow in 1878.
