= Gawler Ranges National Park =

National park in South Australia

- IUCN category VI (protected area with sustainable use of natural resources)
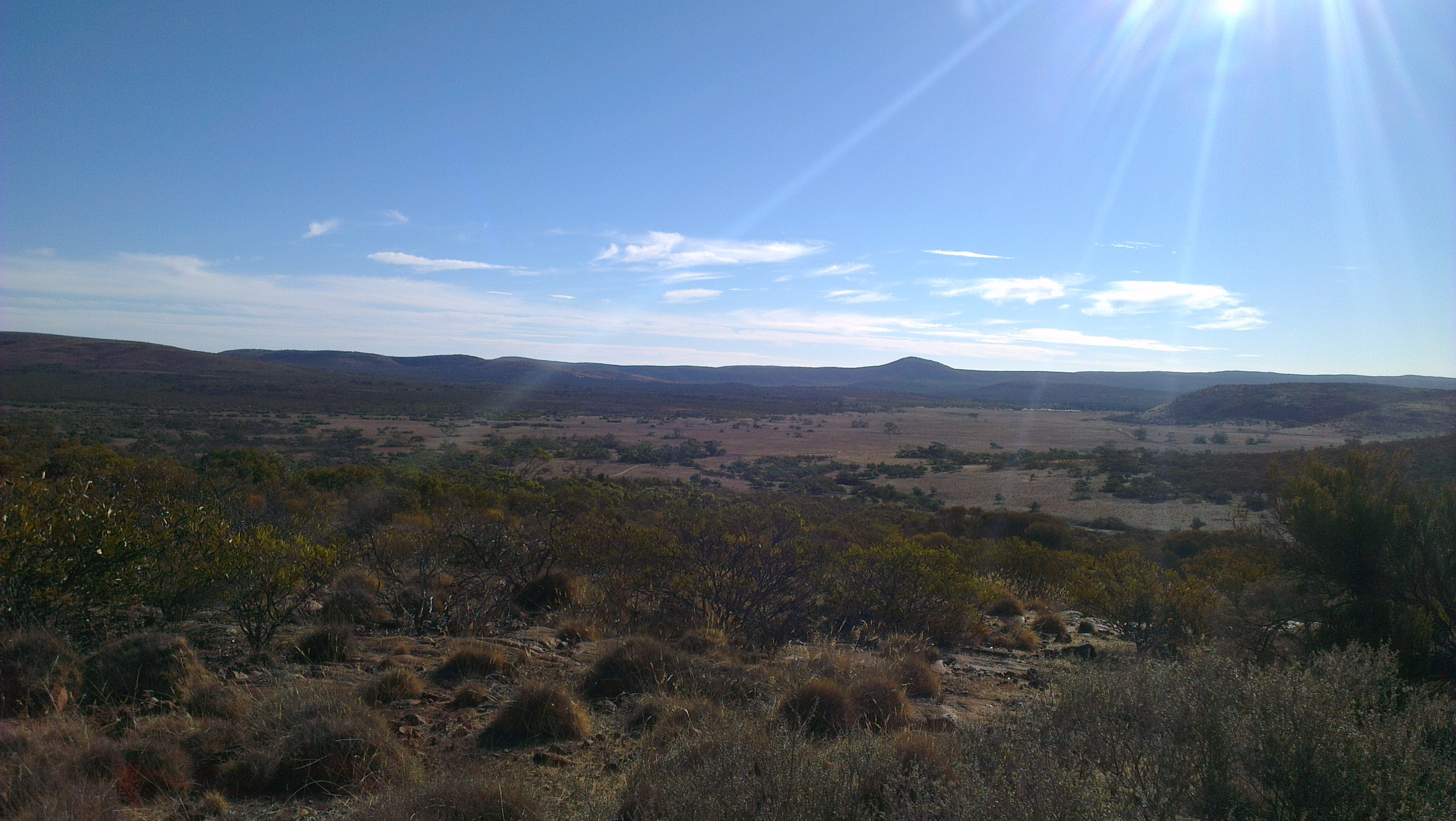
- The Conical Hill Track

- Location within South Australia
- Location: South Australia
- Nearest city: Wudinna
- Coordinates: 32°33′14″S 135°27′50″E
- Area: 1,628.75 km^{2} (628.86 sq mi)
- Established: 15 January 2002
- Governing body: Department for Environment and Water
- Website: Official website

Gawler Ranges National Park is a 1,633 km^{2} (631 sq mi) protected area lying 350 km (217 mi) north-west of Adelaide in the northern Eyre Peninsula of South Australia. It is known for its spectacular rock formations.

== History ==
The national park originated as the 1,200 km^{2} (463 sq mi) Paney Station pastoral lease, which was acquired in 2000 by the South Australian Government with assistance from the Australian Government. In 2001 some 420 km^{2} (162 sq mi) of the adjacent Scrubby Peak Station was acquired and added to the national park.

== Access ==
The national park is 40 km (25 mi) north of Wudinna, 40 km (25 mi) north-east of Minnipa and is accessible using high ground clearance two wheel drive vehicles via the gravel roads from Kimba, Wudinna or Minnipa.

Camping is permissible and encouraged at several campgrounds. Although some have toilets, there are minimal other facilities and visitors are encouraged to take adequate food, water, fuel and firewood with them.

== Features ==
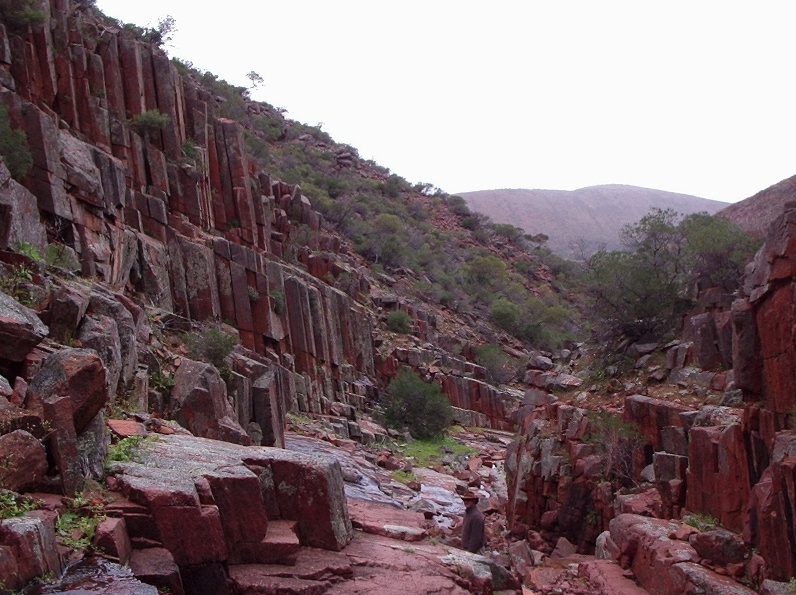
The Organ Pipes in the Gawler Ranges

Historic sites in the national park include the Old Paney Homestead, the Policemans Point precinct, Stone Dam, and Pondanna Outstation, where agriculture was attempted in the early 20th century. Notable landmarks are Paney Bluff, Mount Allalone, Mount Sturt, Conical Hill and Scrubby Peak. Other scenic sites are Kolay Mirica Falls, the Organ Pipes and Yandinga Gorge.

== Environment ==
Some 21 rare and endangered animal and plant species including the yellow-footed rock-wallaby can be found in the national park. Another larger mammal is the southern hairy-nosed wombat. Some 140 species of birds have been recorded in the national park. The area covered by the national park has been identified by BirdLife International as an Important Bird Area (IBA) because it supports populations of the vulnerable malleefowl, the Gawler Ranges subspecies of the short-tailed grasswren, rufous treecreeper, blue-breasted fairy-wren, purple-gaped honeyeater and western yellow robin.

== See also ==
- Protected areas of South Australia
- Gawler (disambiguation)
