= District Council of Port Gawler =

District Council of Port Gawler South Australia
- Coordinates: 34°35′41″S 138°31′02″E
- Established: 1856
- Abolished: 1935
- Council seat: Two Wells
LGAs around District Council of Port Gawler:
Dublin	Grace	Mudla Wirra; Mudla Wirra North
	District Council of Port Gawler	Mudla Wirra; Mudla Wirra South
	Munno Para West	Munno Para West

The District Council of Port Gawler was a local government area in South Australia from 1856 to 1935. It was proclaimed on 11 September 1856 after being severed from the District Council of Mudla Wirra.

Its jurisdiction consisted of most of the Hundred of Port Gawler, excluding that land in the north west corner north of the River Light, and a south-east portion of the Hundred of Grace which fell south of the River Light. It was thus bounded on the north by River Light, on the south by River Gawler, the west by Gulf St Vincent and on the east by the eastern borders of the cadastral hundreds.

The district council's seat was located in the township of Two Wells.

On 1 May 1935, it was amalgamated with the district councils of Dublin and Grace to create the District Council of Light. The new district council was subsequently renamed as the District Council of Mallala in 1937 and again as the Adelaide Plains Council in 2016.

== Chairmen ==
The following persons were elected to serve as chairman of the district council for the following terms:

- C. Temby (1872–73)
- T. Cowan (1873–75)
- R. Day (1875–77)
- C. Temby (1877–81)
- R. Gilks (1881–84)
- H. Secomb (1884–87)
- S. Condon (1887–88)
- H. Secomb (1888–90)
- T. Hatcher (1890–92)
- W. B. Cowan (1892–98)
- H. W. Wilson (1898–1900)
- W. H. Wasley (1900–01)
- W. B. McCord (1901–02) (3 months only)
- W. B. Cowan (1901–03)
- H. W. Wilson (1903–13)
- H. J. Wasley (1913–15)
- J. Rowe (1915–17)
- T. W. Day (1917–25)
- S. A. Wasley (1925–27)
- E. A. Brooks (1927–29)
- E. H. Green (1929–31)
- H. H. Loller (1931–33)
- A. A. Wilson (1933–35)
