= District Council of Grace =

District Council of Grace South Australia
- Coordinates: 34°26′16″S 138°30′27″E
- Established: 1874
- Abolished: 1935
- Council seat: Mallala
LGAs around District Council of Grace:
Balaklava	Dalkey	Alma Plains
Dublin	District Council of Grace	Port Gawler; Mudla Wirra North
Dublin	Port Gawler	Port Gawler

The District Council of Grace was a local government area in South Australia from 1874 to 1935, seated at Mallala.

== History ==
The council was proclaimed on 2 April 1874. Its jurisdiction consisted of the north west two thirds of the Hundred of Grace as the portion of the hundred south of the River Light had already been incorporated into the District Council of Port Gawler in 1856. The inaugural councillors in 1874 were proclaimed as Thomas Sutton, William Bartlett, Samuel Chivell, George Marshman, and Bryan McHugh, the elder.

On 1 May 1935, it was amalgamated with the district councils of Port Gawler (to the south) and Dublin (to the west) to create the District Council of Light. The new district council was subsequently renamed as the District Council of Mallala in 1937 and again as the Adelaide Plains Council in 2016.

== Chairmen ==
The following persons were elected to serve as chairman of the district council for the following terms:

- W. Bartlett (1874)
- H.B. Moody (1874-75)
- B. McHugh (1875-76)
- G. Marshman (1876-79)
- N.J.W. Lindsay (1879-80)
- G. Marshman (1880-82)
- J. Jeffries (1882-83)
- J. Forbes (1883-85)
- G. Marshman (1885-86)
- R. Butler (1886-94)
- G. Marshman (1894-1913)
- J. Nairne (1913-20)
- A.H. Marshman (1920-29)
- P.J. Brady (1929-35)
