= Gawler River (South Australia) =

River in South Australia

Gawler Metta Watte
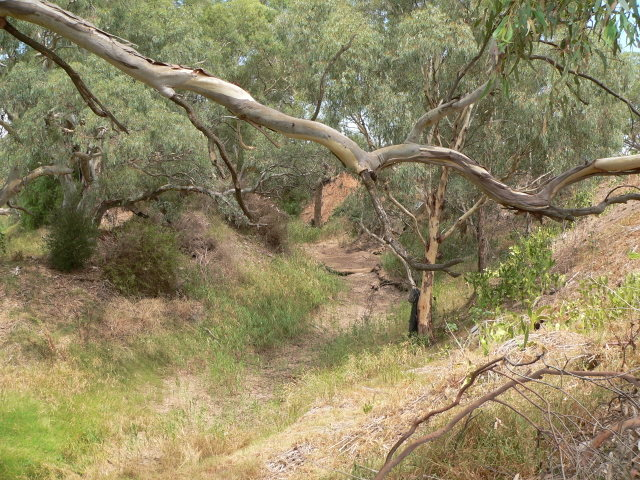

- Location of the river mouth in South Australia

Location
- Country: Australia
- State: South Australia
- Region: Mid North
- District: Adelaide Plains
- Towns: Gawler, Angle Vale, Virginia

Physical characteristics
- Source confluence: South Para River and North Para River
  - location: Gawler
  - elevation: 52 m (171 ft)
- Mouth: Gulf St Vincent
  - location: between Port Gawler and Buckland Park
  - coordinates: 34°40′30″S 138°28′25″E
  - elevation: 0 m (0 ft)
- Length: 41 km (25 mi)
- Basin size: 883 km^{2} (341 sq mi)
- Discharge
  - location: Port Gawler
  - average: 10.3 gigalitres per year (8,400 acre-feet per year)

Basin features
- National park: Adelaide International Bird Sanctuary

The Gawler River is a river in the Adelaide Plains district of the Mid North region in the Australian state of South Australia.

The district surrounding the river produces cereal crops and sheep for both meat and wool, as well as market gardens, almond orchards and vineyards.

== Course and features ==
Formed by the confluence of the North Para and South Para Rivers in the town of Gawler, the river flows generally west onto the Adelaide Plains. The mouth is in the Adelaide International Bird Sanctuary National Park—Winaityinaityi Pangkara, which consists primarily of mangroves in the tidal flats as the river empties into Gulf St Vincent. The outflow represents the boundary between the suburbs of Port Gawler on the northern bank and Buckland Park on the southern bank. The river descends 50 metres (160 ft) over its 41-kilometre (25 mi) course.

The Angle Vale Bridge, located over the river on Heaslip Road in Angle Vale, was a laminated timber deck arch bridge built in 1876. It was the only surviving bridge of its type in Australia. The bridge collapsed in 2023, due to heavy rainfall.

== Flooding ==
The Gawler is subject to periodic flood events and the cause of occasional flash flooding (during 1:10 to 1:50 year flood events). Major overtopping in large floods occurs along much of the river length. Significant flooding commences within Gawler township from both the North and South Para Rivers.

=== Angle Vale ===
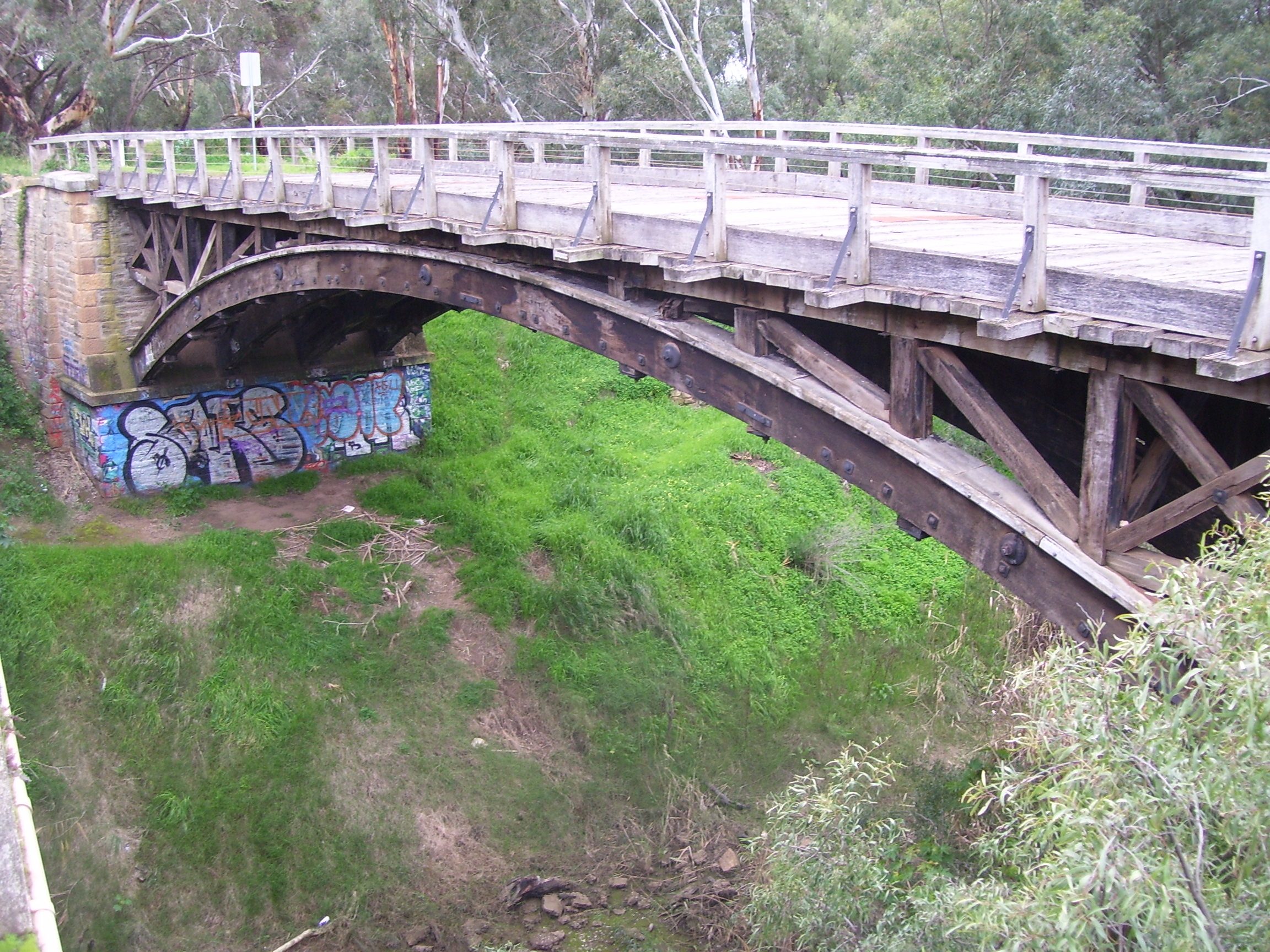
Angle Vale Bridge

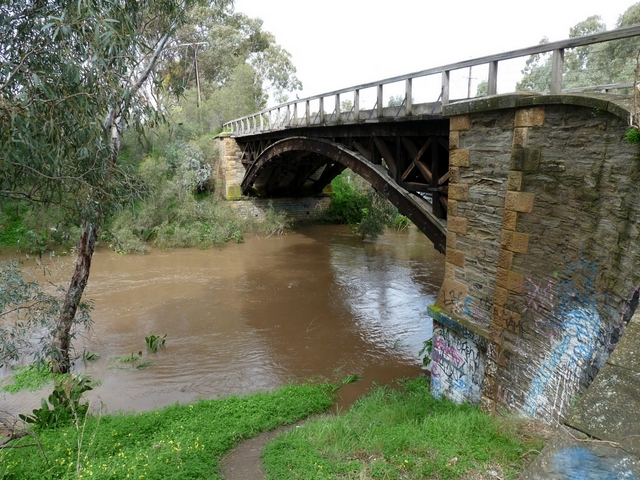
September 2010

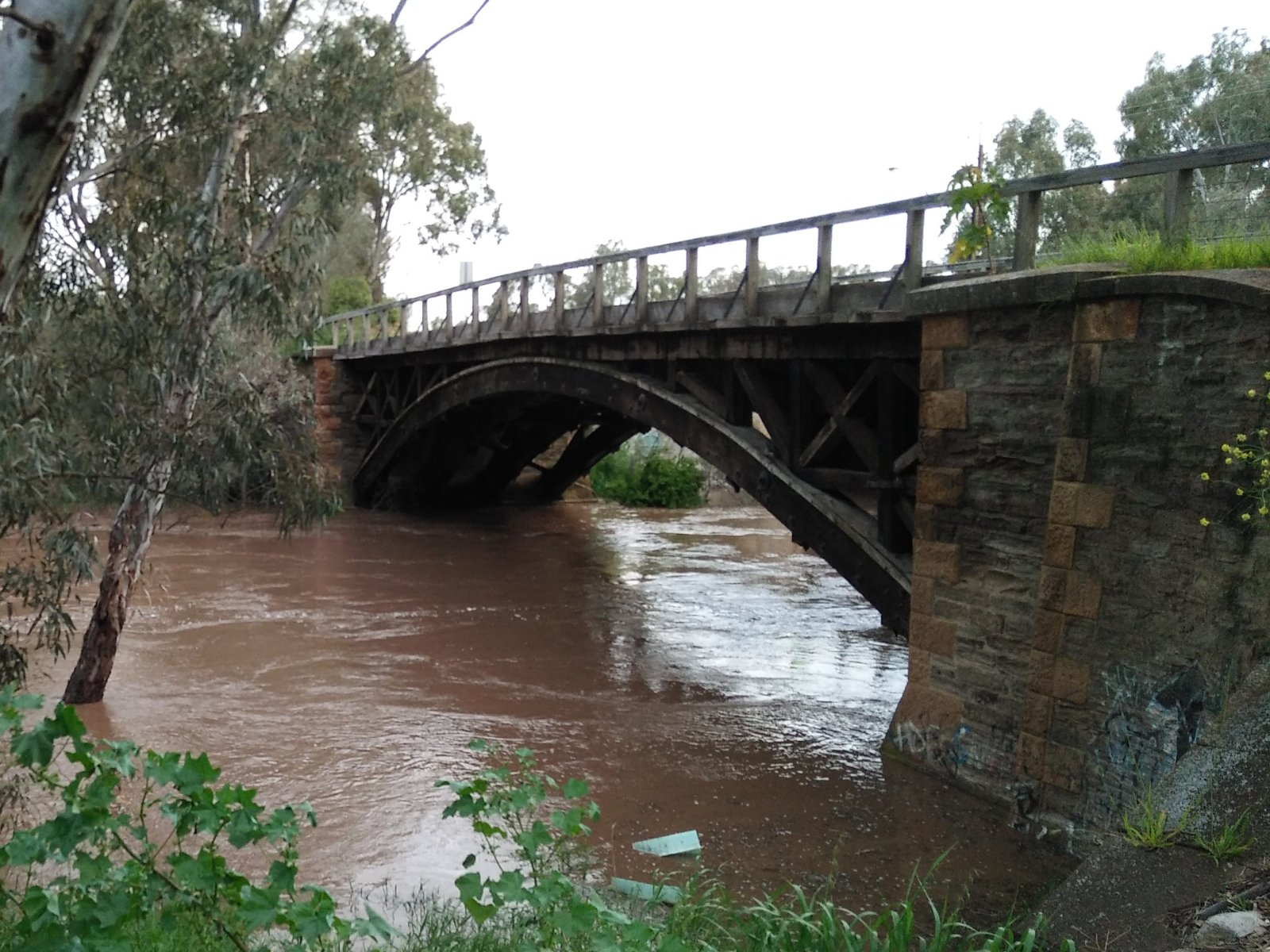
September 2016
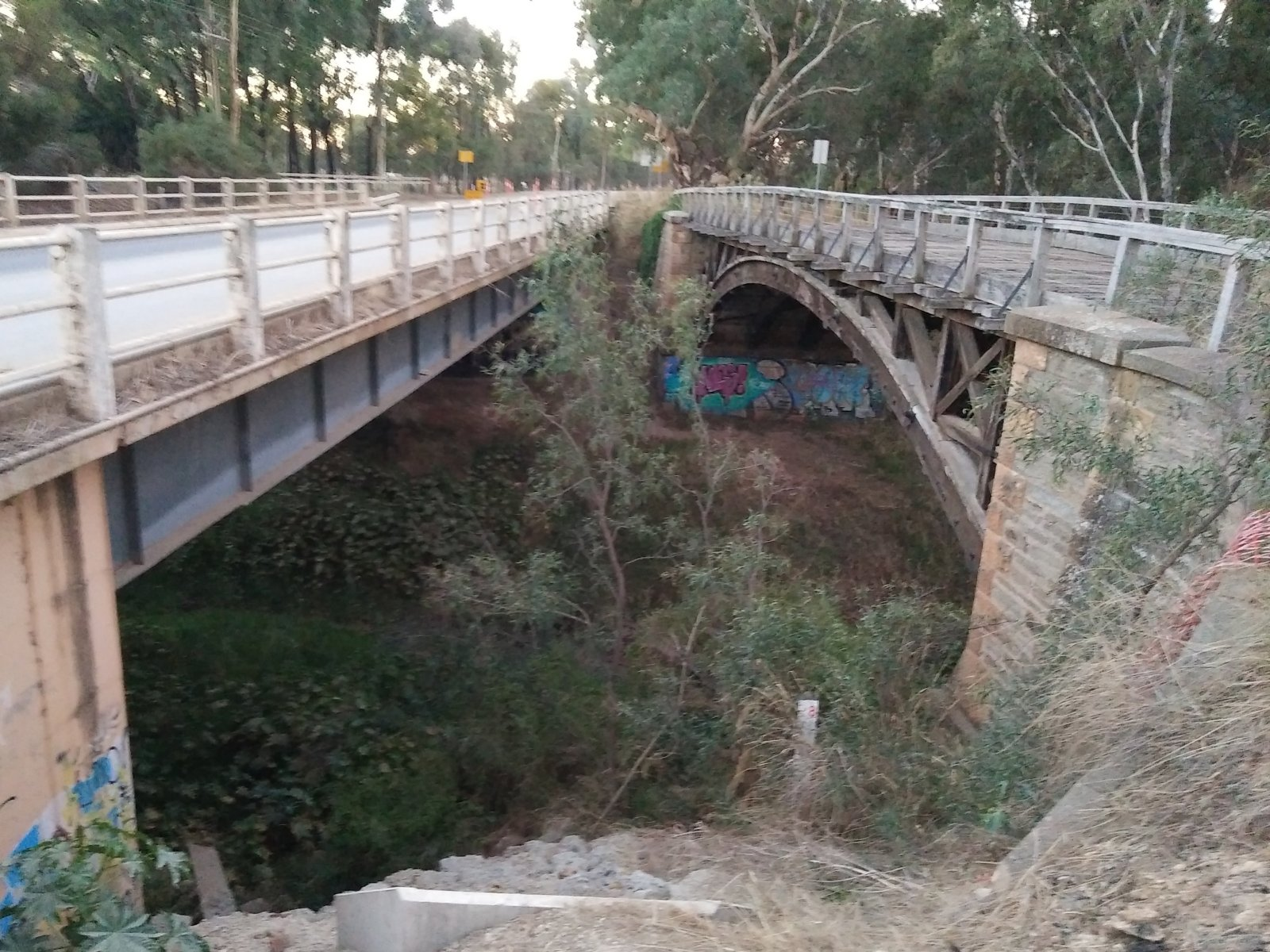
Heaslip Road Bridge

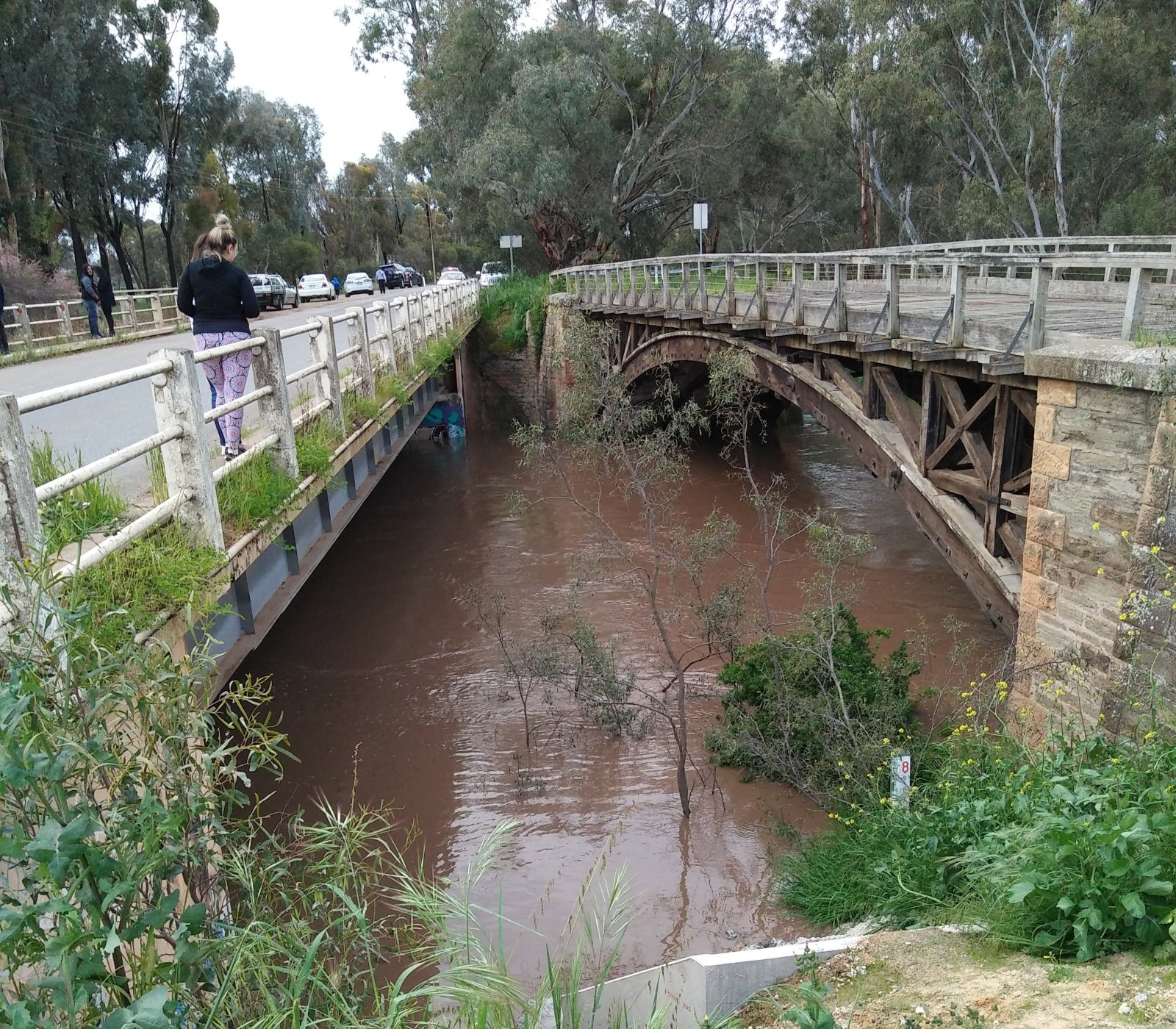
September 2016

=== Baker Road ford, Virginia ===
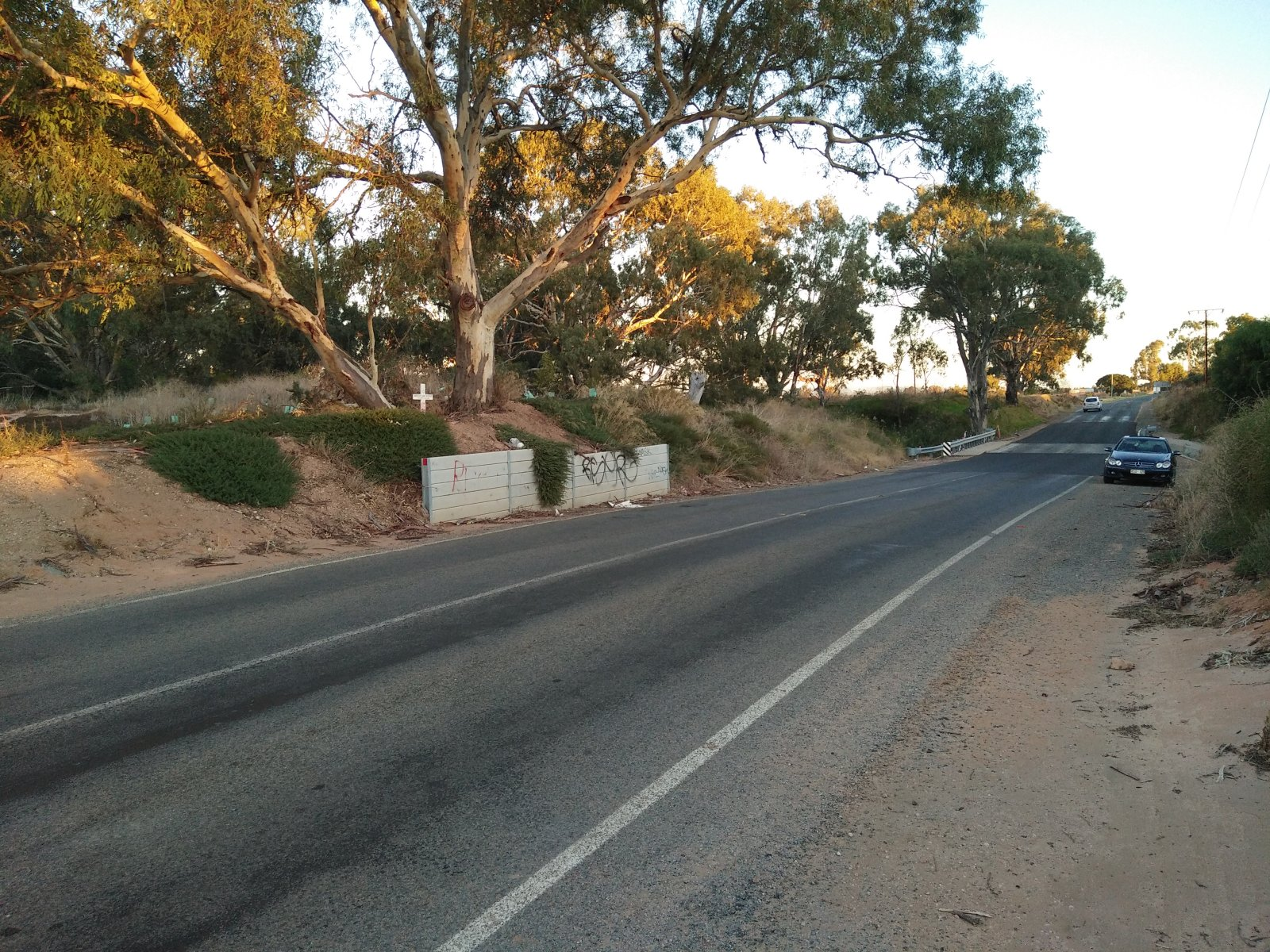

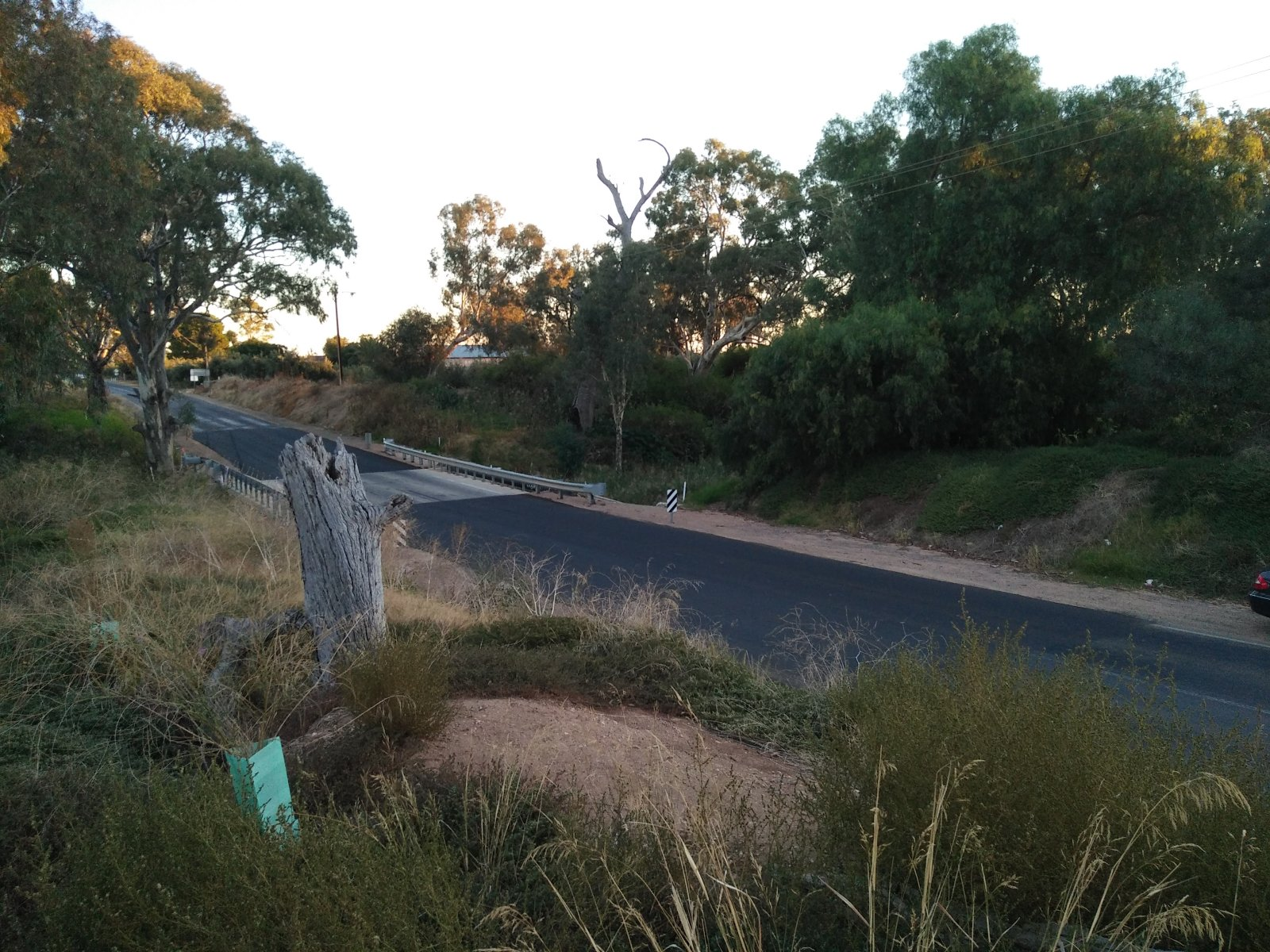

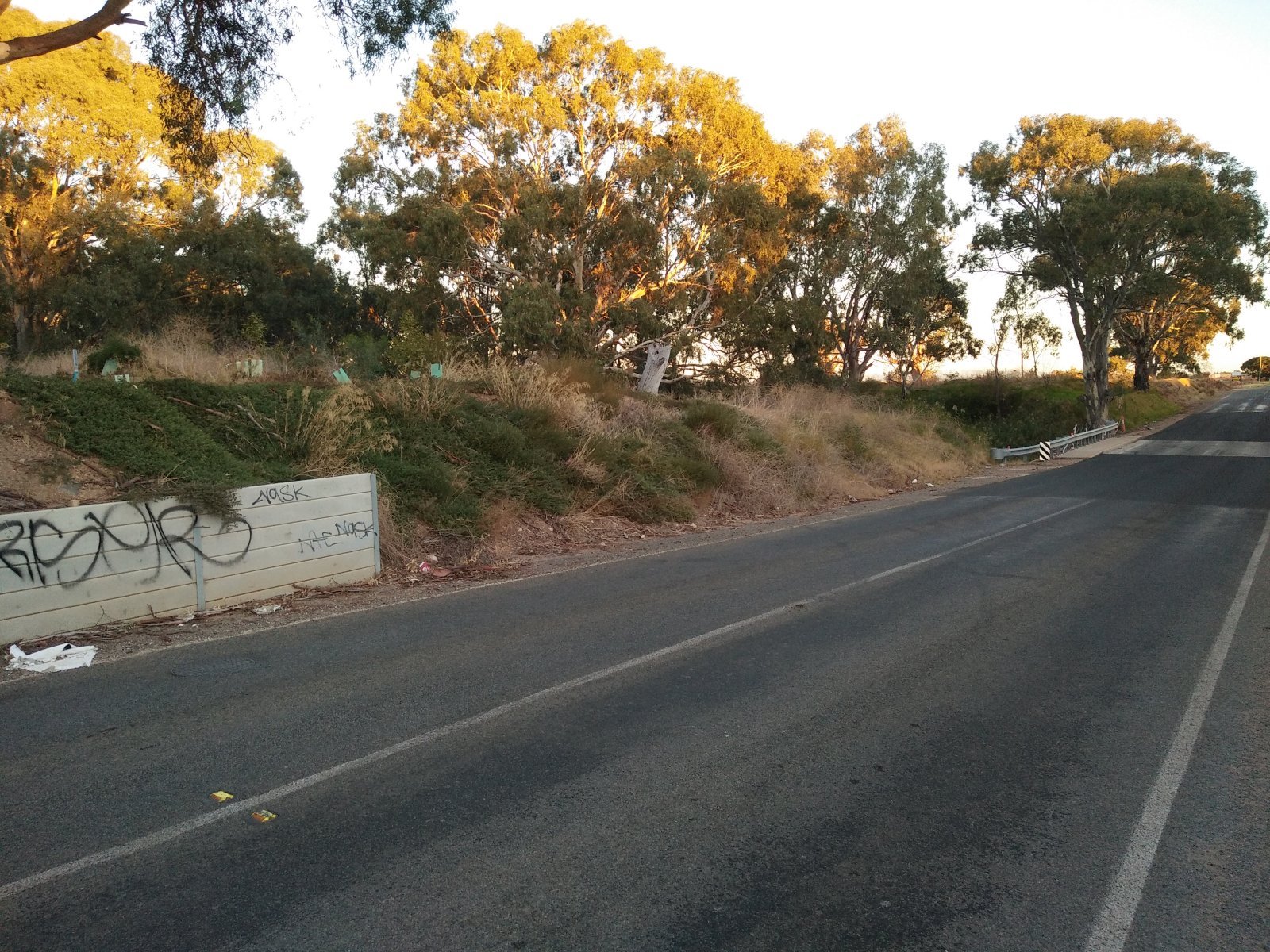

September 2016

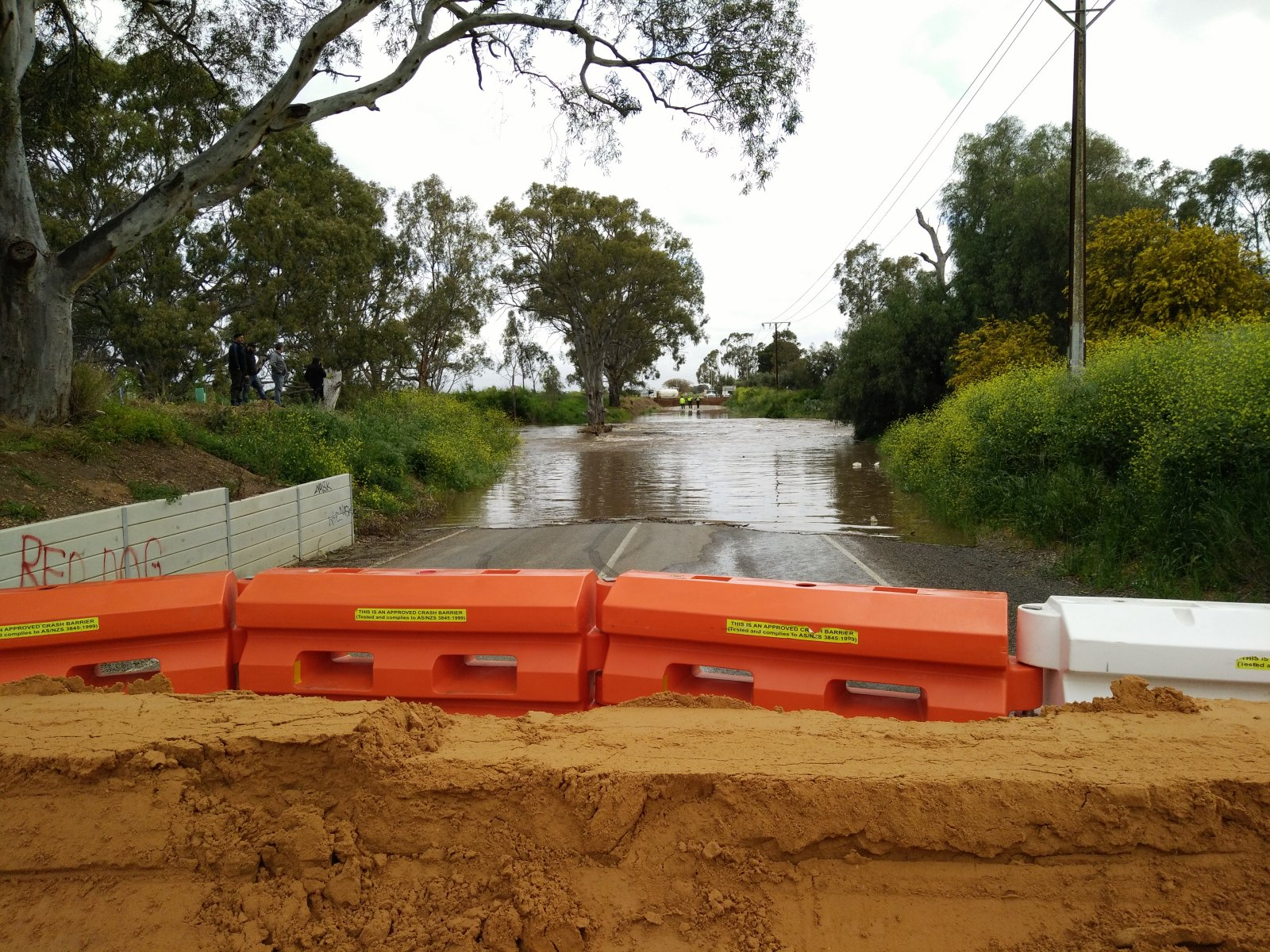

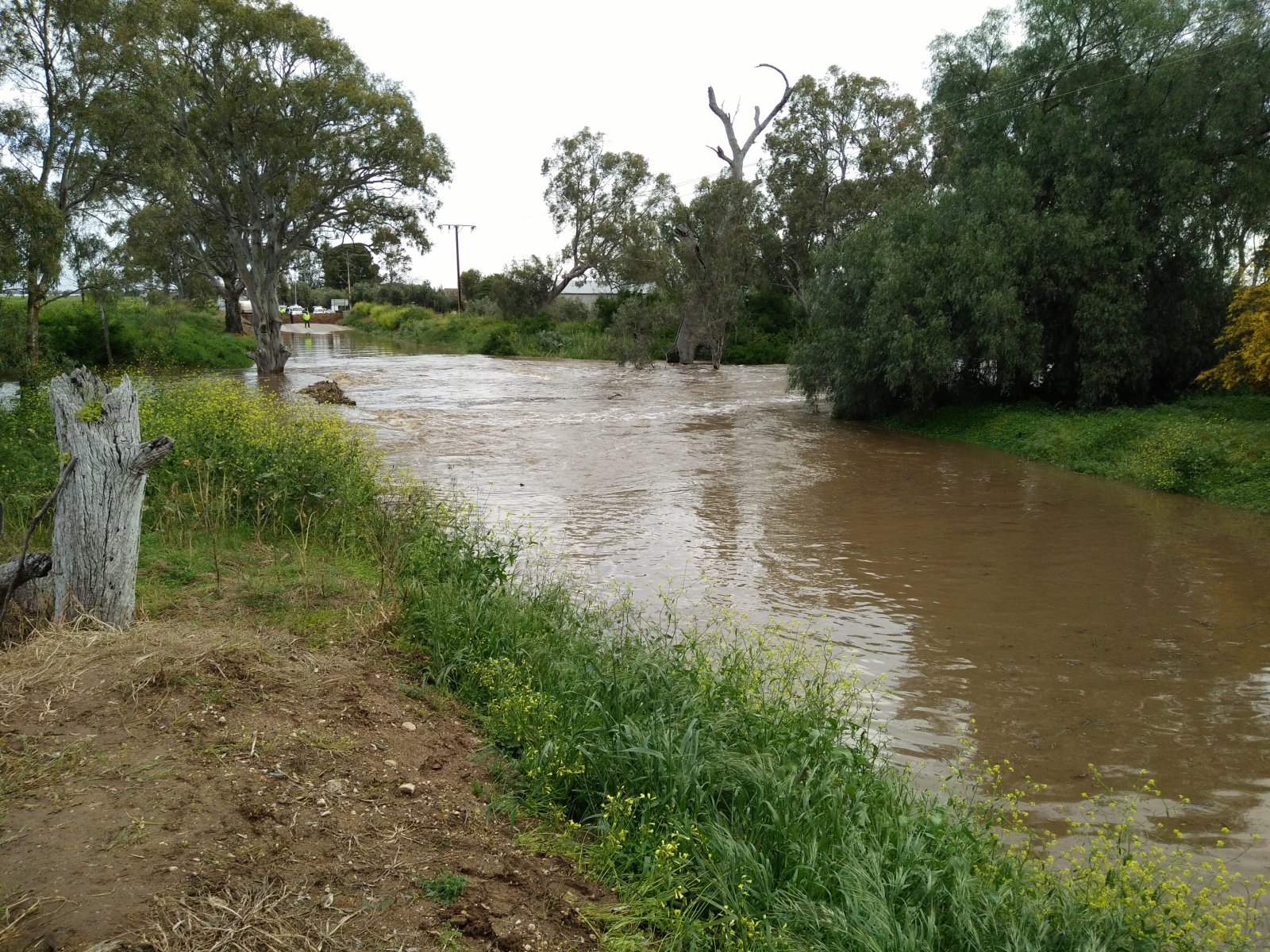

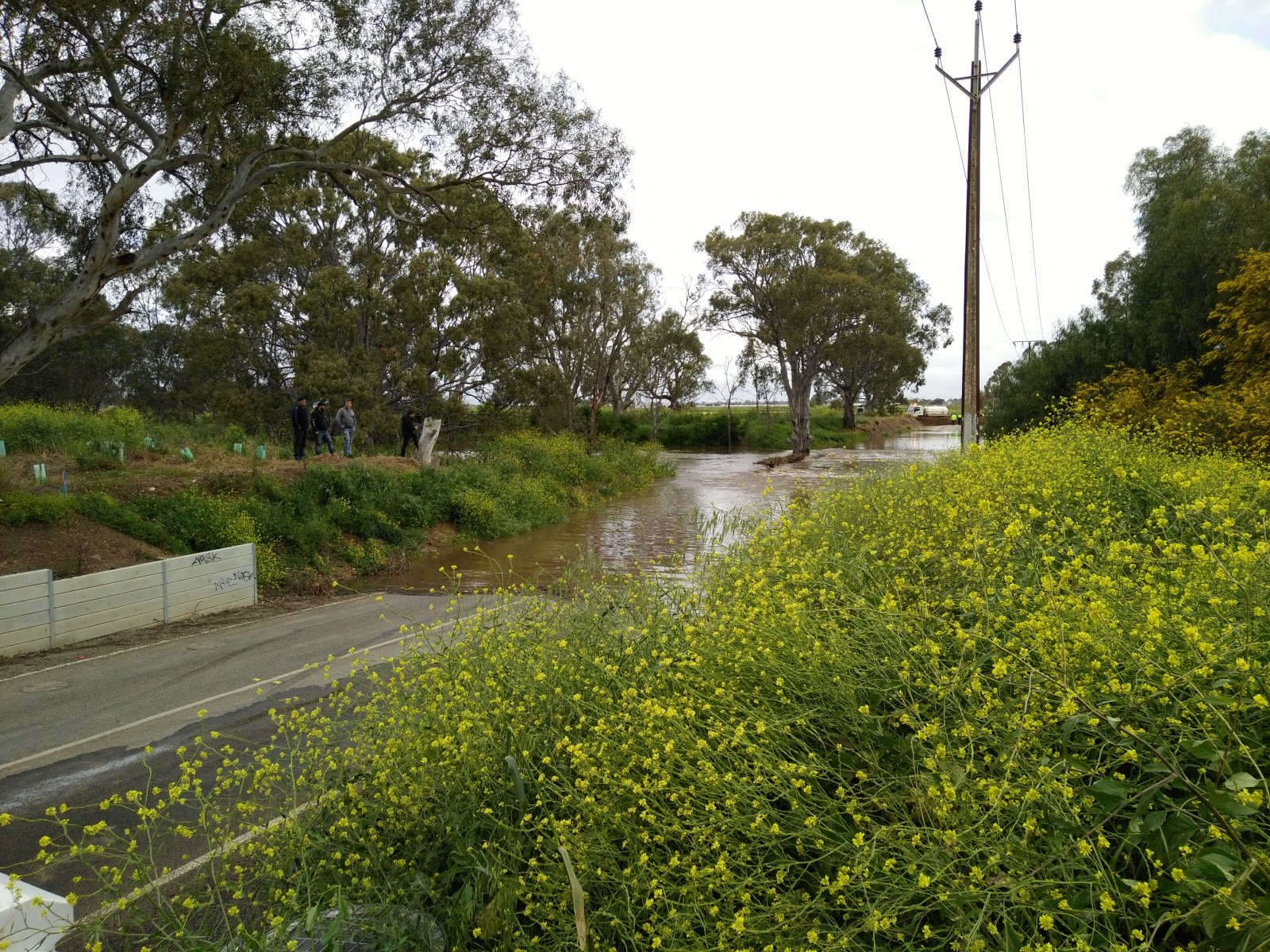

== See also ==
- Rivers of South Australia
