= District Council of Blyth =

District Council of Blyth South Australia
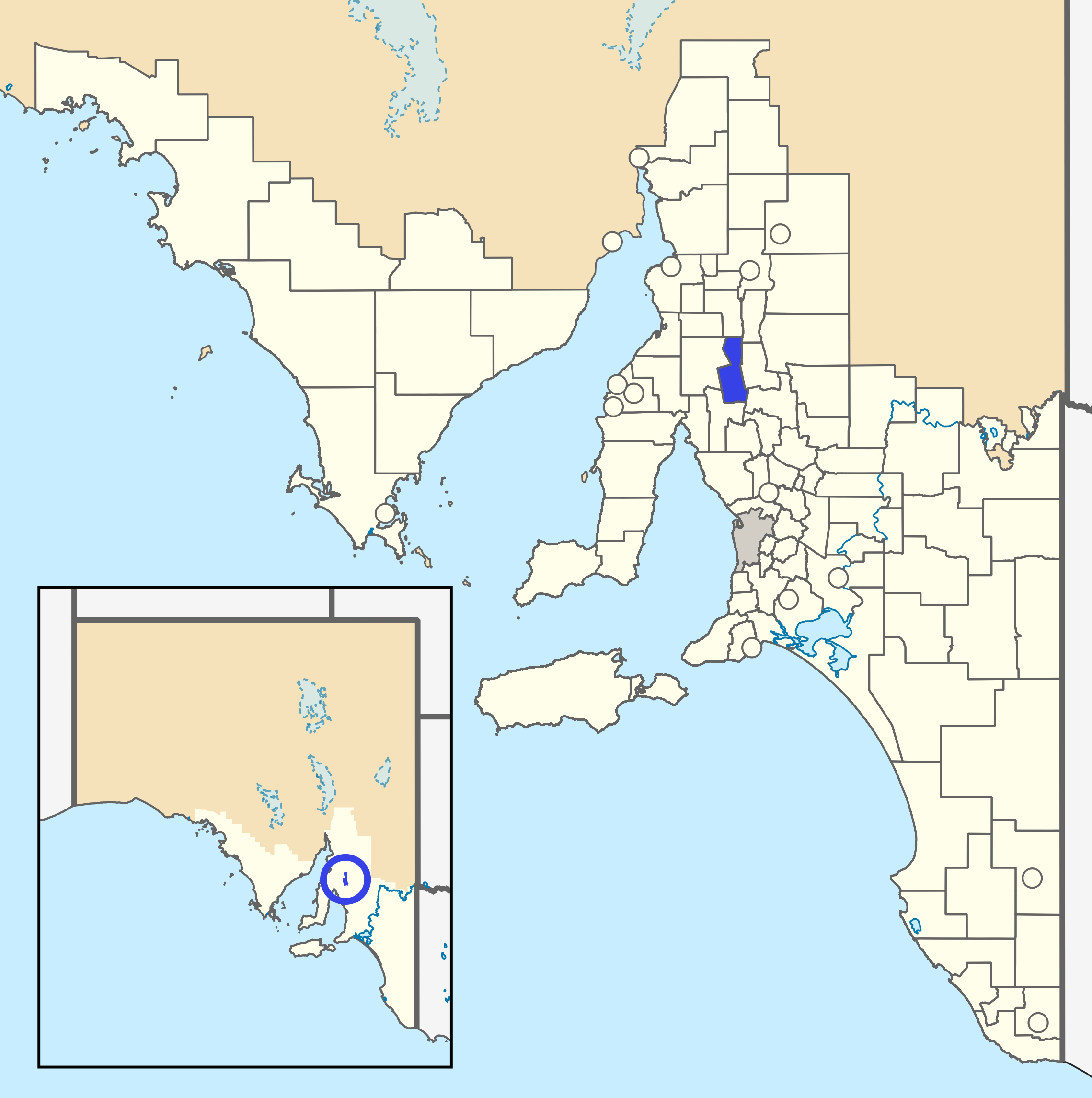
- The District Council of Blyth as it was prior to disestablishment (blue)
- Coordinates: 33°50′50″S 138°29′20″E
- Established: 1872
- Abolished: 1987
- Council seat: Blyth
LGAs around District Council of Blyth:
Broughton/Redhill (1935–1987); Snowtown (1888–1987)	Hill Rivers (1888–1935); Georgetown (1935–1987)	District Council of Hutt and Hill Rivers (1885–1935); Spalding (1935–)
Snowtown (1889–1987)	District Council of Blyth	Clare (1872–1987); Upper Wakefield (1872–1970)
Balaklava (1877–1983); Wakefield Plains (1983–1987)	Hall (1878–1935); Balaklava (1935–1983); Wakefield Plains (1983–1987)	Upper Wakefield (1872–1970); Saddleworth and Auburn (1970–1987)

The District Council of Blyth was a local government area in South Australia from 1872 to 1987 seated at Blyth in the Mid North.

== History ==
The District Council of Blyth was officially proclaimed on 11 January 1872 as constituting the entirety of the Hundred of Blyth. Five inaugural councillors were appointed at the time of proclamation: Edward Lawson, Henry Longmire, John Shepherd, Thomas Roberts and George Semmens.

In January 1888 the council gained the Hundred of Everard under the District Councils Act 1887 before losing it again in September 1889 to the District Council of Snowtown.

In 1935, as a result of the statewide consolidation of local government areas, the Blyth council annexed most of the Hundred of Hart (east of the Gladstone railway line) from the District Council of Hutt and Hill Rivers and the two northern wards of the District Council of Hall (Hoyleton and Woodlands). From the Hutt and Hill Rivers annexation the new wards of Anama (north east) and Hart (north west) were created, and from the Hall annexation the new ward of Hoyleton (south) was created. The remainder of the new Blyth council area was to be split between three other wards: Blyth (centre east), Central (centre west), and Kybunga (centre south east).

On 9 December 1987, the council was amalgamated with the District Council of Snowtown to form the new District Council of Blyth-Snowtown.

== Neighbouring local government ==
The following adjacent local government bodies co-existed with the Blyth council:

- District Council of Hutt and Hill Rivers lay north east from its establishment in 1885. It lay immediately north from 1888, when the Hundred of Hart was incorporated into that council, until 1935, when the south part of the Hundred of Andrews became part of the District Council of Spalding.
- District Council of Clare (established in 1853) lay immediately east.
- District Council of Upper Wakefield (established 1854) lay south east. From 1970, following the amalgamation of Upper Wakefield and Saddleworth councils, the District Council of Auburn and Saddleworth lay south east.
- District Council of Hall lay immediately south from its establishment in 1878 until it was split between Blyth and Balaklava councils in 1935.
- District Council of Balaklava (established 1877) lay south west from 1878 when the Hundred of Stow was incorporated into Balaklava council, and lay south and west from 1935 when the Hundred of Hall was split between Blyth and Balaklava councils. From 1983, following the amalgamation of Balaklava council with Port Wakefield and Owen councils, the District Council of Wakefield Plains lay south and west.
- District Council of Snowtown lay north west from its establishment in 1888 and lay north and west from 1889 when the Hundred of Everard was severed from Blyth council and annexed by Snowtown.
