= Hundred of Boucaut =

Boucaut
- Cadastral division
- Coordinates: 33.72°S 138.33°E
- Country: Australia
- State: South Australia
- Region: Mid North
- LGA(s): Wakefield
- Established: 25 July 1867

Area
  - Total: 280 km^{2} (107 sq mi)
- County: Stanley
Lands administrative divisions around Boucaut
Redhill	Koolunga	Yackamoorundie
Barunga	Boucaut	Hart
Cameron	Everard	Blyth

The Hundred of Boucaut is a cadastral unit of hundred located in the Mid North of South Australia. It is one of the 16 hundreds of the County of Stanley. It was named in 1867 by Governor Dominick Daly after parliamentarian James Boucaut.

The Hundred of Boucaut spans the western half of the town of Brinkworth, most of Condowie, and the eastern halves of Burnsfield and Lake View.

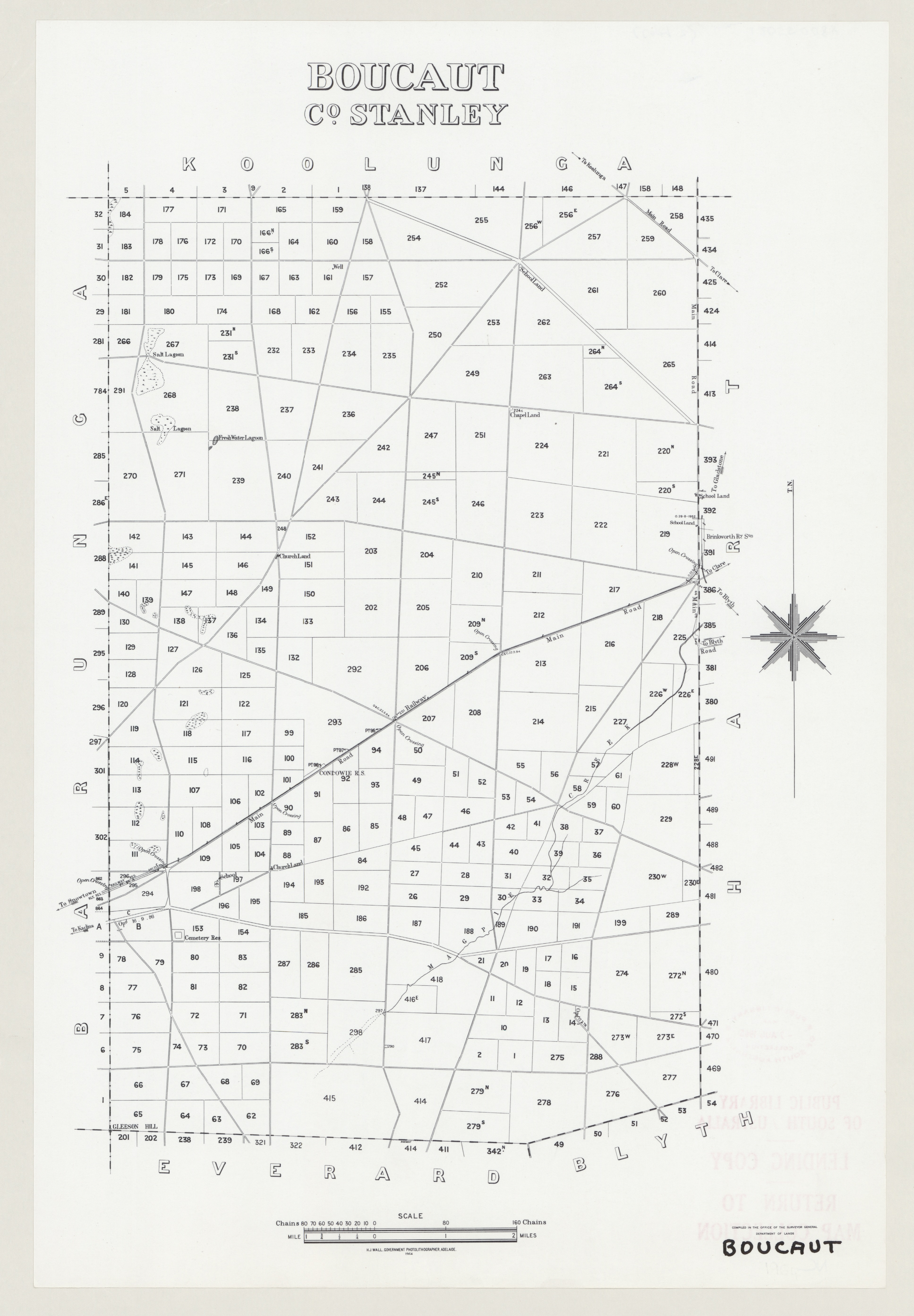
Plan of the Hundred of Boucaut, 1964

== Local government ==
In 1887 the District Council of Snowtown was established, along with many other new local government bodies in South Australia, by the District Councils Act 1887, incorporating the entirety of the Hundred of Boucaut as well as the neighbouring Hundred of Barunga, in which the town of Snowtown lies. Boucaut became a ward within the Snowtown council and retained its status as a ward in the consolidated District Council of Blyth-Snowtown following the 1987 amalgamation. Following the 1997 amalgamation of Blyth-Snowtown and Wakefield Plains councils the hundred has been a part of the much larger North ward of the Wakefield Regional Council.

== See also ==
- Lands administrative divisions of South Australia
