= District Council of Wakefield =

District Council of Wakefield could refer to multiple current and former municipalities in the vicinity of the lower Wakefield River in South Australia:

- District Council of Port Wakefield (1878-1983)
- District Council of Wakefield Plains (1983-1997)
- Wakefield Regional Council (established 1997)
