= Hundred of Goyder =

Goyder
- Cadastral division
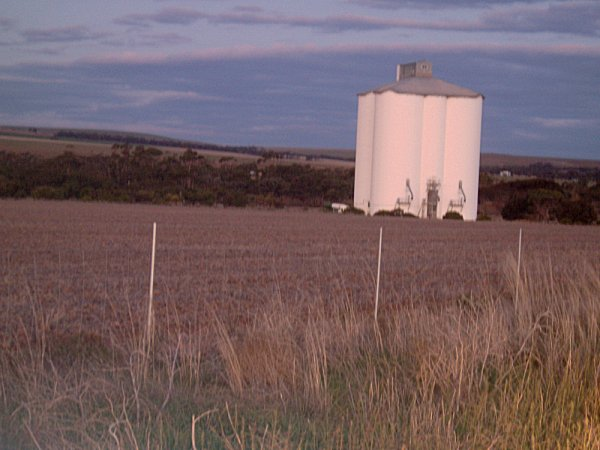
- Grain silo at Nantawarra in the north of the hundred

- Coordinates: 34.070°S 138.219°E
- Country: Australia
- State: South Australia
- Region: Mid North
- LGA(s): Wakefield
- Established: 26 June 1862

Area
  - Total: 258 km^{2} (99.5 sq mi)
- County: Stanley
Lands administrative divisions around Goyder
Cameron	Cameron; Everard	Everard
Kulpara	Goyder	Stow
Clinton	Inkerman	Balaklava

The Hundred of Goyder is the cadastral unit of hundred on the northern Adelaide Plains centred on the locality of Goyder. It is one of the 16 hundreds of the County of Stanley. It was named in 1862 by Governor Dominick Daly after George Goyder, famed South Australian surveyor. In addition to the localities of Goyder and Beaufort, most of Nantawarra lies within the Hundred of Goyder. The portions of Port Wakefield and Bowmans north of the Wakefield River are also inside the hundred, and small parts of the localities of South Hummocks and Mount Templeton cross the western and eastern of boundaries of the hundred, respectively.

== Local government ==
On 14 November 1878 an eastern strip of the Hundred of Goyder was annexed to the District Council of Balaklava along with the Hundred of Stow, following petitioning by resident landowners, and became the new Stow ward of that council. Days later the new District Council of Port Wakefield was proclaimed and incorporated the remainder of the Hundred of Goyder, bringing the whole hundred under local governance.

In 1983 the two local governing bodies in the hundred were amalgamated (along with the District Council of Owen) to form the District Council of Wakefield Plains. Goyder was a constituent ward of the Wakefield Plains council represented by a single councillor.

From 1997 following the amalgamation of Wakefield Plains and Blyth-Snowtown councils, the Hundred of Goyder was split between the much larger North and Central wards of Wakefield Regional Council, with Goyder and Beaufort falling in the Central ward and Nantawarra falling in the North ward.

== See also ==
- Lands administrative divisions of South Australia
