= Hundred of Yackamoorundie =

Yackamoorundie
- Cadastral division
- Coordinates: 33.55°S 138.48°E
- Country: Australia
- State: South Australia
- LGA(s): Northern Areas Council
- Established: 18 February 1869

Area
  - Total: 230 km^{2} (88 sq mi)
- County: Stanley
Lands administrative divisions around Yackamoorundie
Narridy	Bundaleer	Reynolds
Koolunga	Yackamoorundie	Andrews
Boucaut	Hart	Milne

The Hundred of Yackamoorundie is a cadastral unit of hundred in the County of Stanley, South Australia.

The main town of the hundred is Yacka, which was named after the hundred, the hundred in turn being named after Yackamoorundie Creek. The bounded locality of Gulnare, which overlaps the hundred's northern border is the only other town or locality within the hundred. Rising north of Caltowie in the Hundred of Caltowie, the Yackamoorundie Creek, a tributary of the Rocky River, flows briefly through the hundred near Gulnare, at which point it makes a significant change from flowing southwards to flowing westwards.

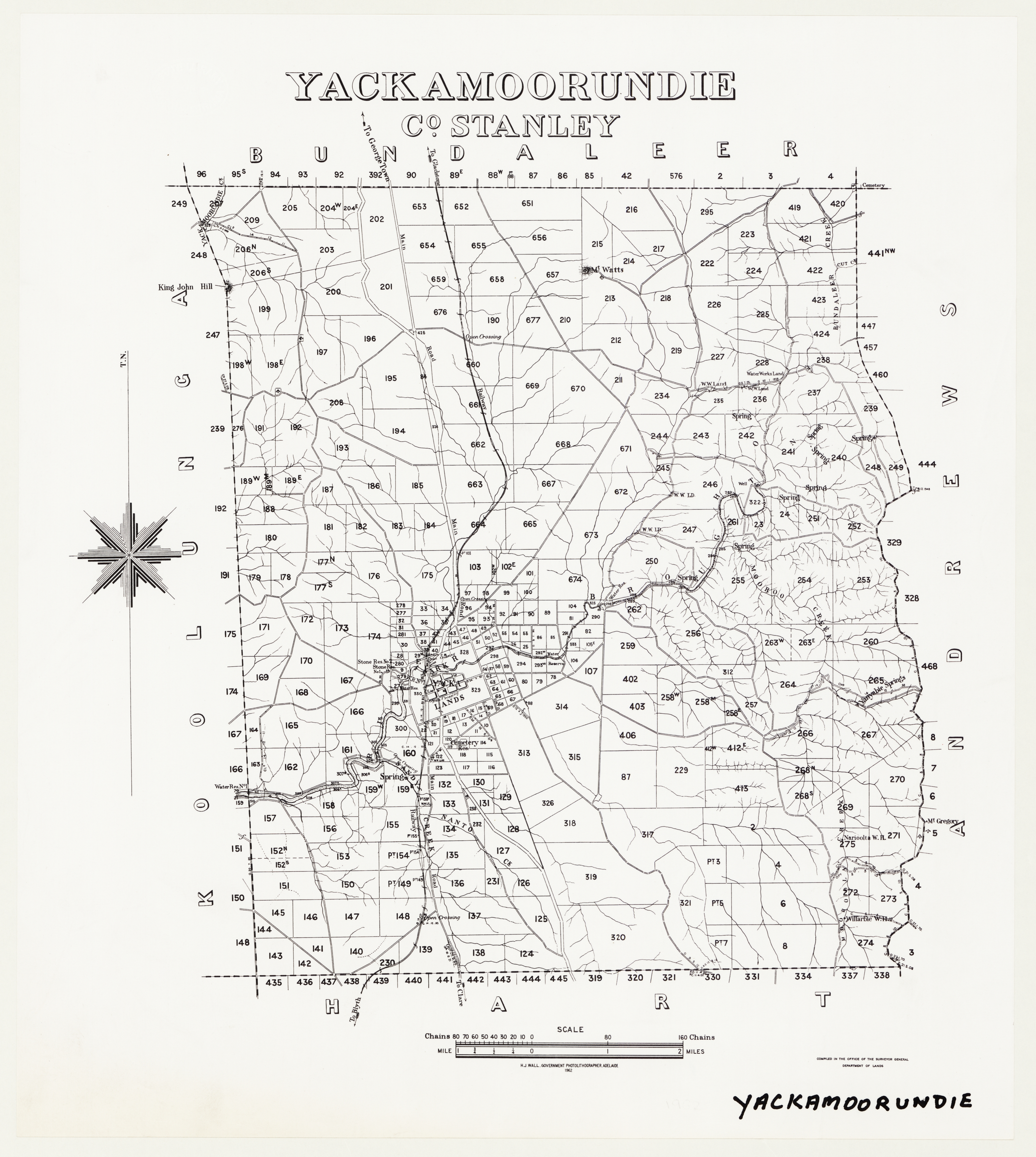
Plan of the Hundred of Yackamoorundie in 1962

The indigenous place name yackamoorundie or jakaramurundi is officially thought to mean "sister to the big river", the Yackamoorundie Creek flowing from this point on a roughly parallel course to the bigger River Broughton, which passes east to west through the centre of the hundred and ultimately receives the Yackamoorundie Creek flows. South Australian historian Geoffrey Manning instead records that the place name means "sandy plain country" and suggests a completely different etymology for the town of Yacka.

== History ==
The hundred was proclaimed on 18 February 1869 by Governor James Fergusson. In 1888 the hundred was annexed by the District Council of Georgetown, bringing local government to the hundred. In 1988 the Georgetown council became part of the new District Council of Rocky River by amalgamation with neighbouring councils. Then, in 1997, the Rocky River council itself amalgamated with the Jamestown and the Spalding councils, bringing the hundred under local governance of the new Northern Areas Council.

== See also ==
- Lands administrative divisions of South Australia
