= Hundred of Hall =

Hall
- Cadastral division
- Coordinates: 34.06°S 138.50°E
- Country: Australia
- State: South Australia
- Region: Mid North
- LGA(s): Wakefield
- Established: 23 February 1860

Area
  - Total: 150 km^{2} (56 sq mi)
- County: Stanley
Lands administrative divisions around Hall
Everard	Blyth	Clare
Stow	Hall	Upper Wakefield
Balaklava	Dalkey	Alma

The Hundred of Hall is the cadastral unit of hundred on the northern Adelaide Plains centred on the town of Halbury. It is one of the 16 hundreds of the County of Stanley. It was named in 1860 after parliamentarian George Hall (1851-1867). The main localities in the hundred are Halbury and Hoyleton with parts of Balaklava, Stow, Watchman and Kybunga, also within the hundred bounds.

== Local government ==
On 14 November 1878, the District Council of Hall was established, bringing local government to the hundred, following petitioning by resident landowners. The five wards of Hall council were Hoyleton, Halbury, Wakefield, Woodlands and Watchman's Plains. The Watchman's Plains ward was moved to the District Council of Balaklava in 1911, the Halbury and Wakefield wards to the same in 1935, and the Hoyleton and Woodlands wards to the District Council of Blyth also in 1935.

From 1935 to 1997, the north and south parts of the hundred were locally governed by separate bodies: The south by Balaklava council then the District Council of Wakefield Plains from 1983; the north by Blyth council then the District Council of Blyth-Snowtown from 1987. In 1997 the merger of Wakefield Plains and Blyth-Snowtown councils brought the whole hundred back under the governance of a single local government with the creation of the Wakefield Regional Council. Since 1997, most of the hundred has been in the North ward of Wakefield council, with a south western portion near to the township of Balaklava being in the Central ward.

== See also ==
- Lands administrative divisions of South Australia
