= Hundred of Blyth (South Australia) =

Blyth South Australia
- Coordinates: 33°50′S 138°29′E
- Established: 23 February 1860
- Area: 295 km^{2} (113.9 sq mi)
- LGA(s): Wakefield
- Region: Mid North
- County: Stanley
Lands administrative divisions around Blyth:
Boucaut	Hart	Milne
Everard	Blyth	Clare
Stow	Hall	Upper Wakefield

The Hundred of Blyth is a cadastral unit of hundred on the northern Adelaide Plains of South Australia centred on the township of Blyth. It is one of the 16 hundreds of the County of Stanley. It was named in 1860 by Governor Richard MacDonnell after Arthur Blyth who arrived in South Australia as a teenager in 1839 and went on to become a local businessman, parliamentarian and thrice the premier of South Australia.

Apart from the town of Blyth the locality of Kybunga is also in the hundred, and the historic settlement of Bowillia is on the eastern boundary of the hundred.

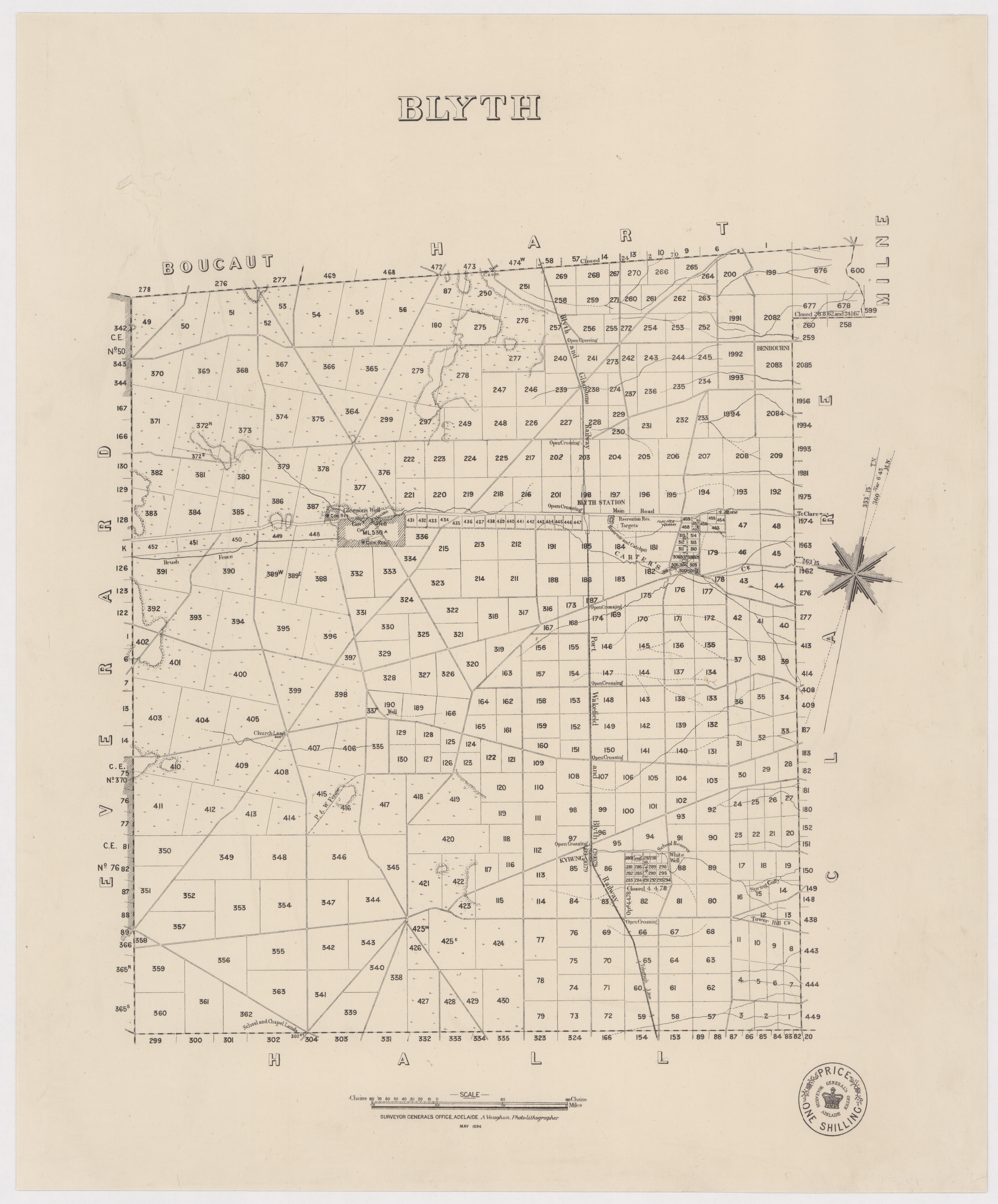
Hundred of Blyth, 1894

== Local government ==
On 11 January 1872 the District Council of Blyth was established, bringing local government to the hundred. Following the amalgamation in 1987 of Blyth council with the District Council of Snowtown the hundred became part of the District Council of Blyth-Snowtown, being still divided into the three wards of Blyth, Central and Kybunga. From 1997, the entire hundred became part of the North ward of the Wakefield Regional Council, following the amalgamation of Blyth-Snowtown council with the District Council of Wakefield Plains.

== See also ==
- Lands administrative divisions of South Australia
