= Hundred of Cameron =

Cameron
- Cadastral division
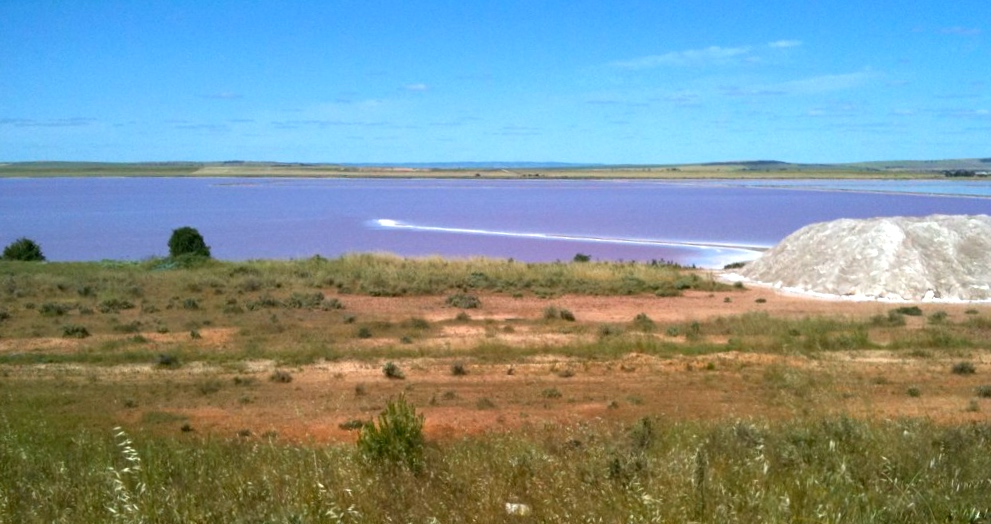
- Lake Bumbunga, Lochiel at the centre of the hundred

- Coordinates: 33.89°S 138.17°E
- Country: Australia
- State: South Australia
- Region: Mid North
- LGA: Wakefield
- Established: 18 February 1869

Area
  - Total: 306 km^{2} (118 sq mi)
- County: Daly
Lands administrative divisions around Cameron
Wiltunga	Barunga	Boucaut
Ninnes	Cameron	Everard
Kulpara	Goyder	Stow

The Hundred of Cameron is a cadastral unit of hundred located in the Mid North of South Australia centred on Lake Bumbunga. The northern Hummock Range occupies much of the western half of the area and the Adelaide-Port Augusta railway line runs near and parallel to the eastern boundary. It is one of the 16 hundreds of the County of Daly. It was named in 1869 by Governor James Fergusson for early pioneer Hugh Cameron.

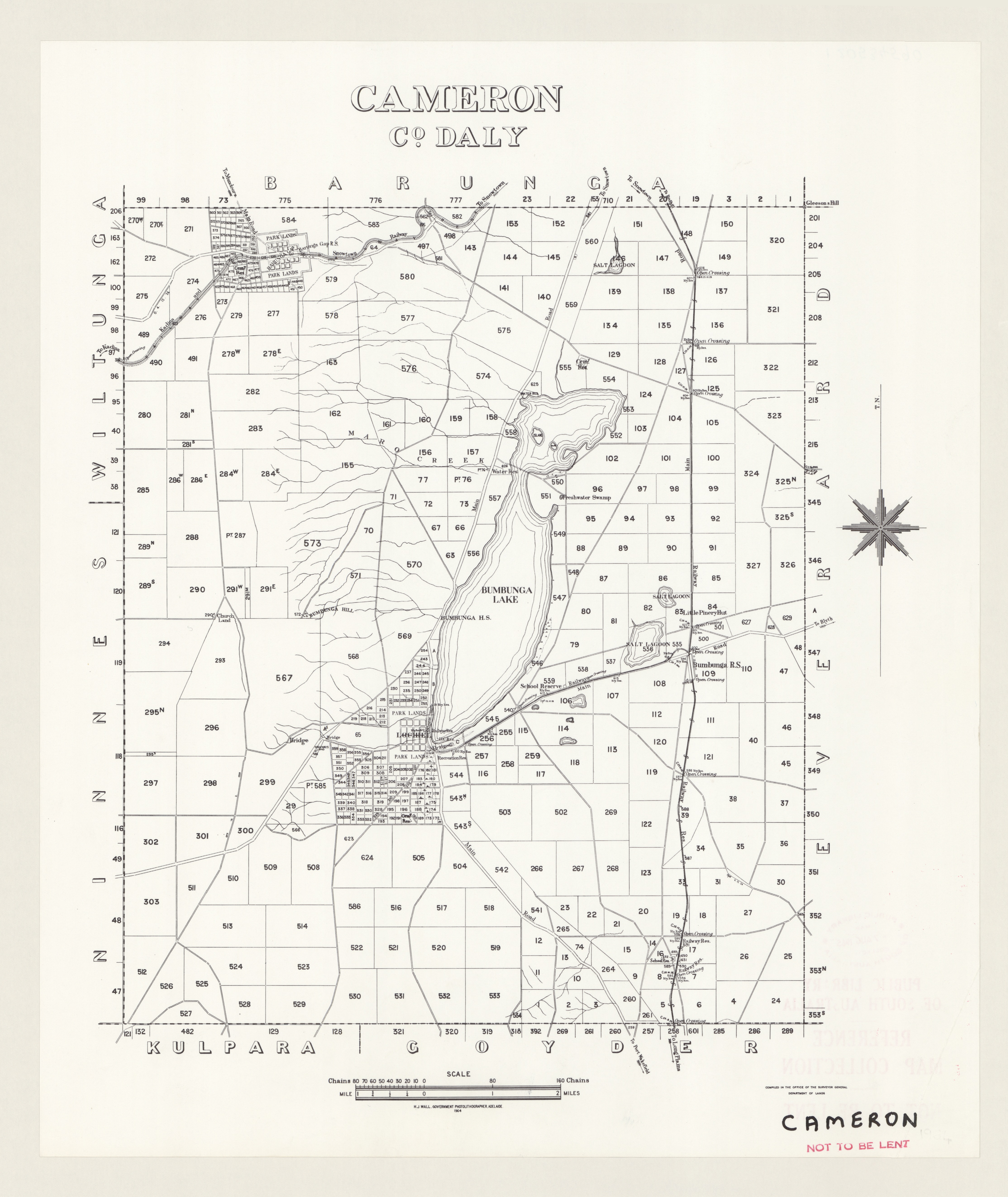
Plan of the Hundred of Cameron in 1964

The town of Lochiel, most of the locality of Bumbunga and the southern half of the locality of Barunga Gap are situated inside the bounds of the hundred.

== Local government ==
In 1888 the Hundred of Cameron was annexed to the District Council of Port Wakefield as part of the District Councils Act 1887. On 6 February 1890, following much vibrant discussion by ratepayers as to the pros and cons, the hundred was formally severed from the council of Port Wakefield and annexed to the District Council of Snowtown as the new Cameron ward.

In 1987 it retained its status as a ward in the consolidated District Council of Blyth-Snowtown before being reunited, for the purposes of local governance, with Port Wakefield following the amalgamation of Blyth-Snowtown and Wakefield Plains council into the new Wakefield Regional Council in 1997. Since then, the hundred has been a part of the much larger North ward of the Wakefield council.

== See also ==
- Lands administrative divisions of South Australia
