= Everard Central, South Australia =

Everard Central South Australia
- Coordinates: 33°57′55″S 138°18′59″E
- Population: 33 (SAL 2016)
- Postcode(s): 5461
- Location: 108 km (67 mi) N of Adelaide
- LGA(s): Wakefield Regional Council
- Region: Mid North
- State electorate(s): Frome
- Federal division(s): Grey
Localities around Everard Central:
Snowtown	Condowie	Hart, Blyth
Bumbunga	Everard Central	Bowillia
Nantawarra	Mount Templeton, Whitwarta	Stow

Everard Central (33°58′S 138°19′E; postcode: 5461) is a locality in South Australia's Mid North. The locality is situated in approximately the southern two thirds of the cadastral Hundred of Everard.

== Hundred of Everard ==
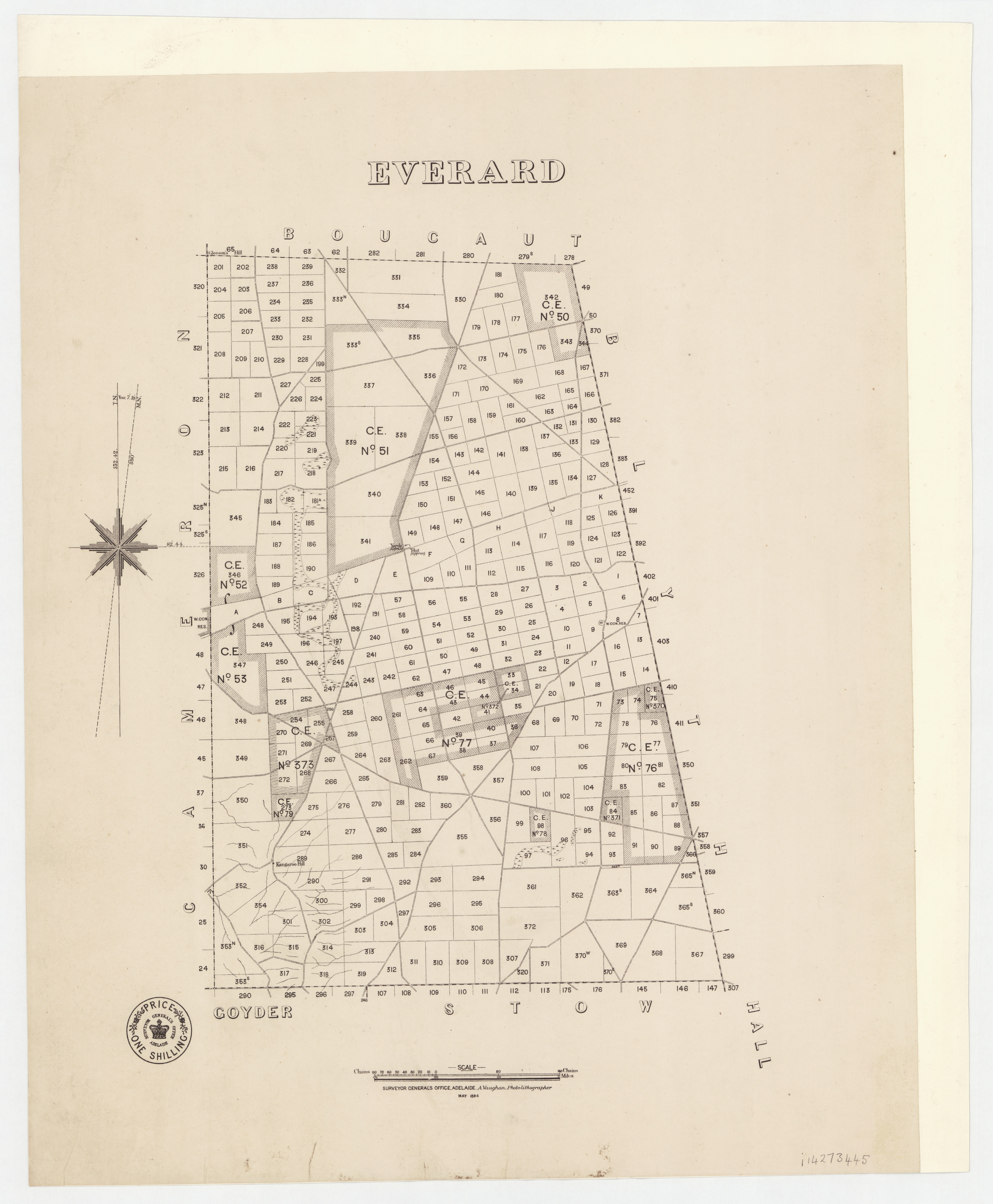
Hundred of Everard, 1894

Everard South Australia
- Population: 33 (SAL 2016)
- Established: 24 May 1867
- Area: 215 km^{2} (83.0 sq mi)
- County: Stanley
Lands administrative divisions around Everard:
Barunga	Boucaut	Hart
Cameron	Everard	Blyth
Goyder	Stow	Hall

The Hundred of Everard is the cadastral unit of hundred on the northern Adelaide Plains containing the Everard Central locality. It is one of the 16 hundreds of the County of Stanley. It was named in 1867 by Governor Dominick Daly after William Everard (1819–1889), a South Australian parliamentarian. The southern third of the locality of Condowie is also situated inside the bounds of the Hundred of Everard.

=== Local government ===
In 1888 the Hundred of Everard was annexed to the District Council of Blyth as part of the District Councils Act 1887. Not long after, on 26 September 1889, the hundred was severed from Blyth council and annexed instead to the District Council of Snowtown as the Everard ward.

In 1912, at the instigation of resident landowners, a southern portion of the hundred south of Everard Road and including the Everard Central township, was severed from Snowtown council and added to the District Council of Balaklava as part of its Stow ward. From 1987, following the merging of Snowtown and Blyth councils, the larger north part of the hundred retained is ward status with 2 council representatives in the Blyth-Snowtown council. From 1997, following the Blyth-Snowtown amalgamation with the District Council of Wakefield Plains, the entire hundred became part of the much larger North ward of the Wakefield Regional Council.

== Geology ==
Everard Central contains a series of ephemeral salt lake basins. The lunette formations at the basin edges contain deposits of gypsum. Gypsum for agricultural use is mined at the site, with 35,000 tonnes being obtained by G.J. Mills and McArdle in 2002.

== See also ==
- List of cities and towns in South Australia
- Lands administrative divisions of South Australia
