= District Council of Snowtown =

District Council of Snowtown South Australia
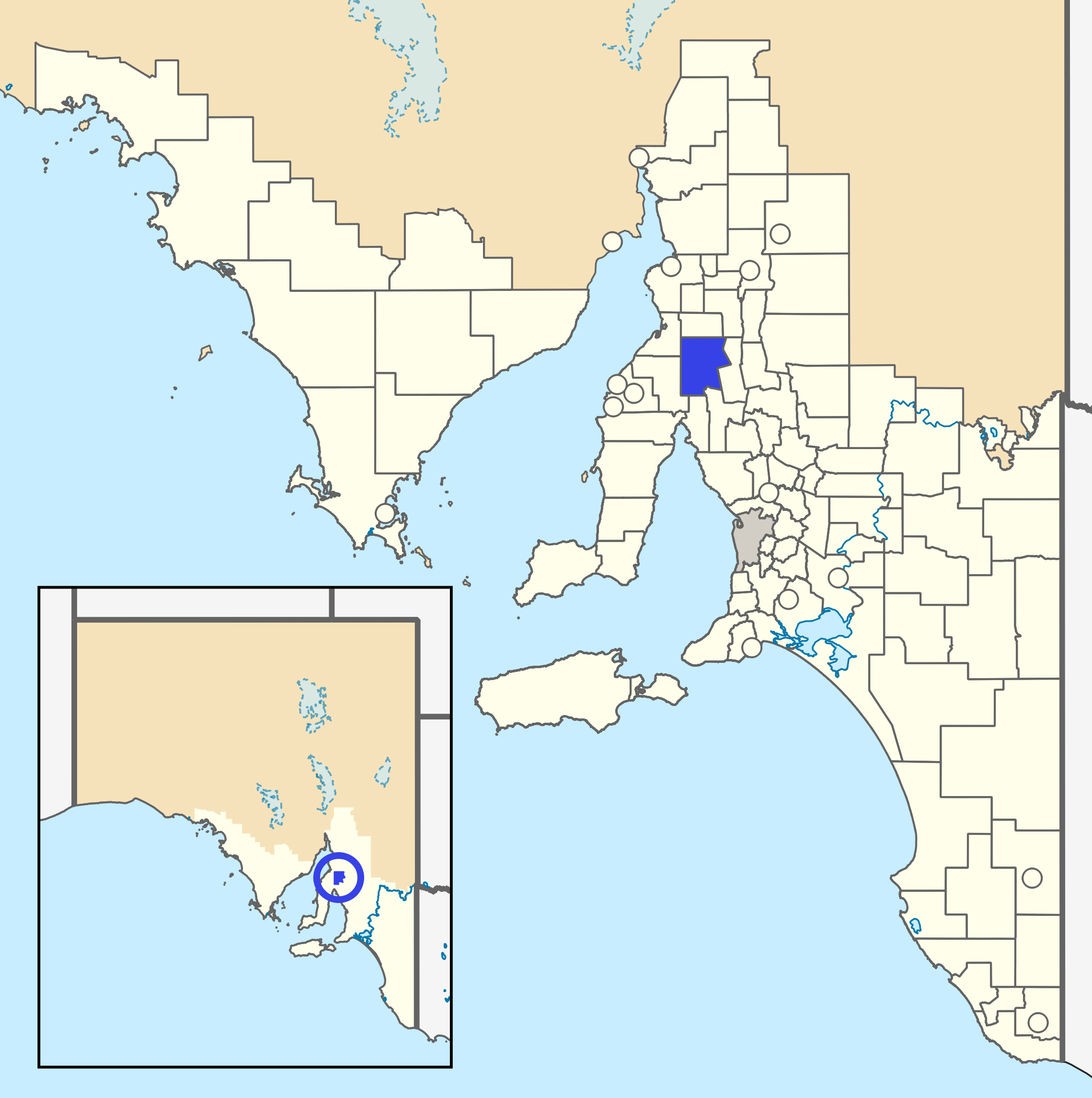
- The District Council of Snowtown as it was prior to disestablishment (blue)
- Coordinates: 33°46′58″S 138°12′55″E
- Established: 1888
- Abolished: 1987
- Council seat: Snowtown
LGAs around District Council of Snowtown:
Broughton/Redhill (1888-1892); Mundoora/Port Broughton (1892-1987)	Broughton/Redhill (1888-1987)	Georgetown (1888-1987)
Ninnes/Bute (1888-1987)	District Council of Snowtown	Hutt and Hill Rivers (1888-1935); Blyth (1888-1987)
Ninnes/Bute (1888-1987); Kulpara (1888-1932)	Port Wakefield (1888-1983); Wakefield Plains (1983-1987)	Hall (1888-1935); Balaklava (1888-1987)

The District Council of Snowtown was a local government area in South Australia from 1888 to 1987.

== History ==
The District Council of Snowtown was officially proclaimed on 5 January 1888 by the District Councils Act 1887 as constituting the Hundreds of Barunga and Boucaut.

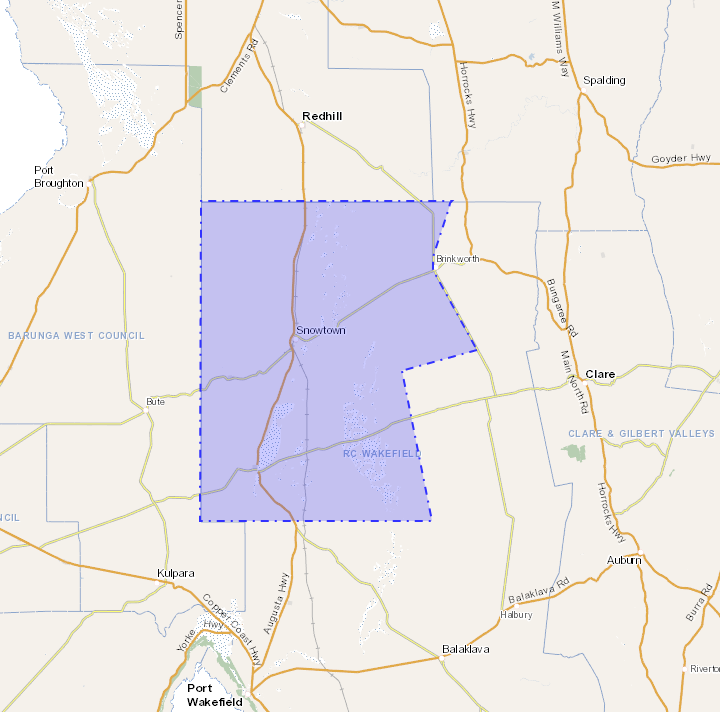
Map of District of Snowtown boundaries within the state's Mid North as at 1909

The council was headquartered at the new government town of Snowtown and six inaugural councillors were appointed by proclamation on 19 January 1888: Joseph Turner, William Henry Hall, David Edward Paterson, Joseph Harris, Daniel Painter, and John Shepherd, junior.

In 1889 and 1890 the council expanded south, gaining the Hundred of Everard from the District Council of Blyth on 26 September 1889 and the Hundred of Cameron from the District Council of Port Wakefield on 6 February 1890.

On 8 April 1909 the council expanded slightly east to gain the south west portion of the Hundred of Hart (land west of the Gladstone-Brinkworth rail line) from the District Council of Hutt and Hill Rivers.

On 8 December 1987, the council was amalgamated with the District Council of Blyth to form the new District Council of Blyth-Snowtown.

== Neighbouring local government ==
The following adjacent local government bodies co-existed with the Snowtown council:

- District Council of Broughton (established 1888 and renamed District Council of Redhill in 1912) lay immediately north. Until 1892 it also lay north west, prior to the annexation of the Hundred of Wokurna to the new District Council of Mundoora (later called District Council of Port Broughton).
- District Council of Georgetown (established 1876) lay north east.
- District Council of Blyth (established 1872) and District Council of Hutt and Hill Rivers (established 1885) lay immediately east until the latter was disestablished in 1935 and the Hundred of Hart (adjacent to Snowtown council's Boucaut ward) was annexed by Blyth council.
- District Council of Hall (established 1878) lay south east until it was split between Blyth and Balaklava councils in 1935.
- The District Council of Balaklava (established 1877) and District Council of Port Wakefield (established 1878) lay immediately south. From 1983 the District Council of Wakefield Plains lay to the south, following the amalgamation of Balaklava, Port Wakefield and Owen councils.
- District Council of Kulpara (established 1878) lay south west. From 1932 Bute council lay south west, following its annexation of the eastern part of the Hundred of Kulpara.
- District Council of Ninnes (established 1885 and renamed District Council of Bute in 1933) lay immediately west.
