= District Council of Blyth-Snowtown =

District Council of Blyth-Snowtown South Australia
- Coordinates: 33°46′58″S 138°12′55″E
- Established: 1987
- Abolished: 1997
- Council seat: Balaklava
LGAs around District Council of Blyth-Snowtown:
Port Broughton	Crystal Brook-Redhill	Rocky River
Bute	Blyth-Snowtown	Clare
Bute	Wakefield Plains	Saddleworth and Auburn

The District Council of Blyth-Snowtown (established as the District Council of Blyth and Snowtown) was a local government area in South Australia from 1987 until 1997.

On 9 December 1987 the council was established by the amalgamation of the District Council of Blyth and the District Council of Snowtown, having been promulgated by the state government on 9 July 1987.

At its establishment the council consisted of 16 councillors representing 11 wards. The ward boundaries were unchanged from those of the two constituent councils. Former Snowtown wards were Barunga (2 members), Boucaut (2 members), Snowtown (2 members), Cameron (2 members) and Everard (2 members). Former Blyth wards were Anama (1 member), Hart (1 member), Blyth (1 member), Central (1 member), Kybunga (1 member) and Hoyleton (1 member).

On 1 July 1997 the council was merged with the District Council of Wakefield Plains to form the new Wakefield Regional Council, with the entire former council area forming the large part of the North ward in the new council.

== See also ==
- Hundred of Barunga
- Hundred of Boucaut
- Hundred of Cameron
- Hundred of Everard
- Hundred of Blyth
- Hundred of Hart
- Hundred of Hall
