= Hundred of Stanley =

Stanley
- Cadastral division
- Coordinates: 33.908°S 138.821°E
- Country: Australia
- State: South Australia
- Region: Mid North
- LGA(s): Clare and Gilbert Valleys
- Established: 7 August 1851

Area
  - Total: 234 km^{2} (90.5 sq mi)
- County: Stanley
Lands administrative divisions around Stanley
Clare	Hanson	Apoinga
Clare; Upper Wakefield	Stanley	Apoinga
Upper Wakefield	Saddleworth	Waterloo

The Hundred of Stanley is a cadastral unit of hundred in the northern Mount Lofty Ranges. It is one of the 16 hundreds of the County of Stanley.

The following localities and towns of the Clare and Gilbert Valleys council area are situated inside (or largely inside) the bounds of the hundred: Stanley, Black Springs, Mintaro (part), Farrell Flat (part) and Manoora (part)

== History ==
The hundred was proclaimed in 1851 by Governor Henry Young and named after its parent County of Stanley, which itself was named after Edward Smith-Stanley, a British parliamentarian who had, in 1842, advocated financial support for the province of South Australia.

The first local government bodies within the hundred were the District Council of Stanley and District Council of Black Springs, established in 1868.

Both councils ultimately became a part of the District Council of Clare. Clare council in turn ultimately became part of the much larger District Council of Clare and Gilbert Valleys by amalgamation with councils to its south in 1997.

== See also ==
- Lands administrative divisions of South Australia
