= Corporation and District Council of Clare =

District Council of Clare
- Local government area
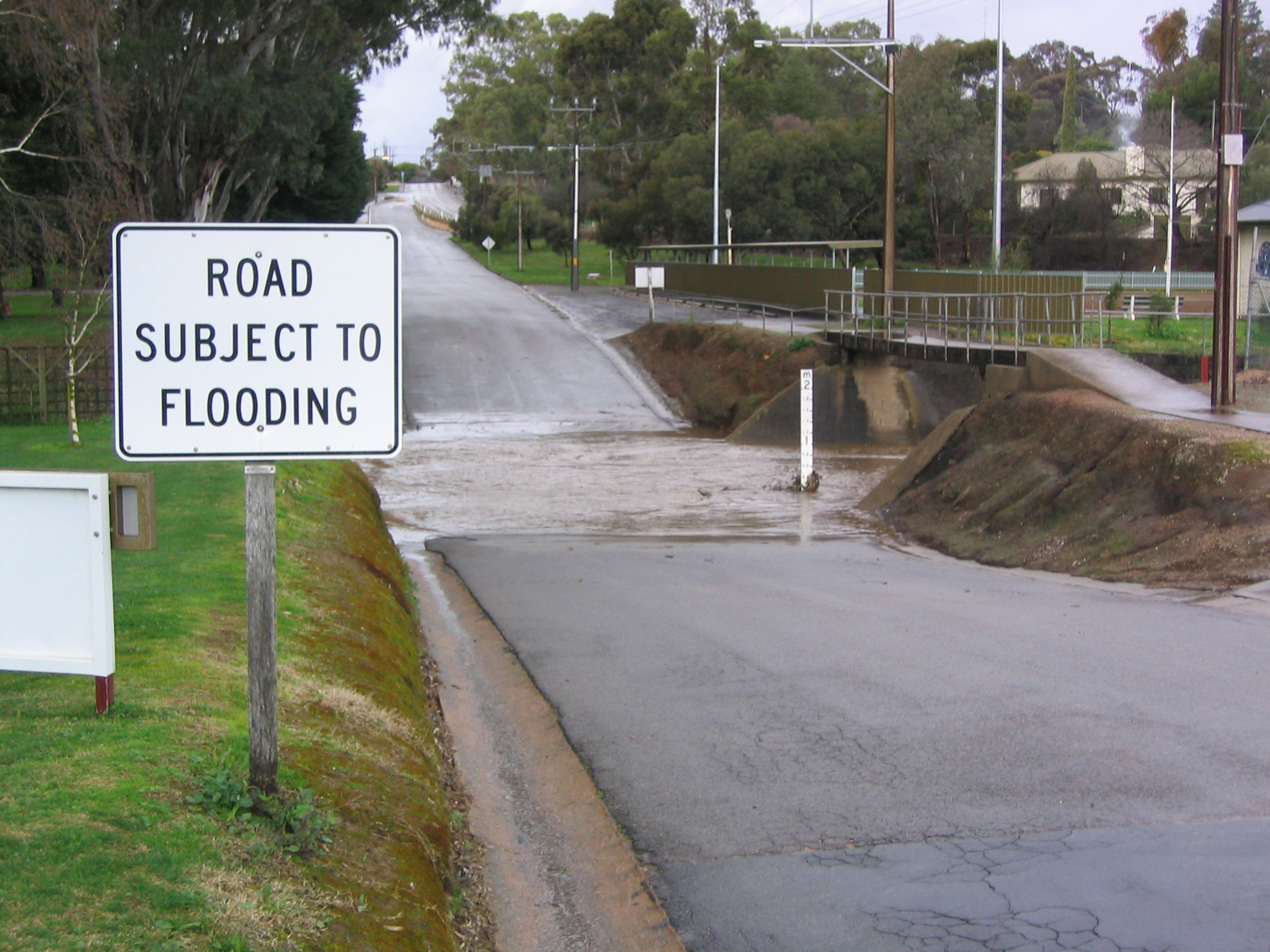
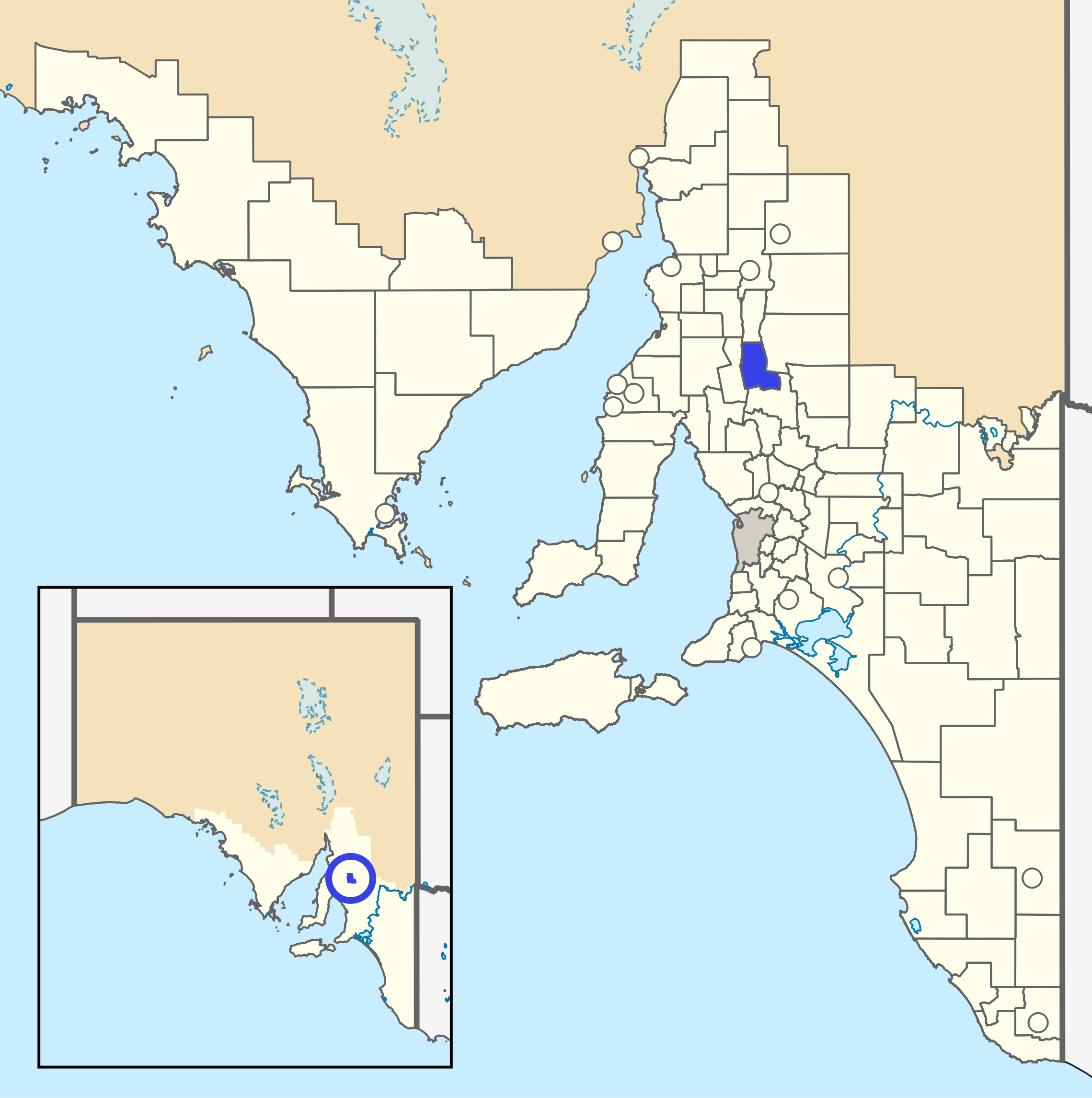
- Suburban ford of the Hutt River in Clare The District Council of Clare as it was prior to disestablishment (blue)
- Coordinates: 33°50′0″S 138°36′0″E
- Country: Australia
- State: South Australia
- Established: 20 July 1853
- Abolished: 1997
- Council seat: Clare

Area
  - Total: 662 km^{2} (256 sq mi)

Population
  - Total(s): 5,800 (1936)
  - Density: 8.76/km^{2} (22.69/sq mi)
LGAs around District Council of Clare
Hutt and Hill Rivers; Georgetown; Rocky River	Hutt and Hill Rivers; Spalding	Hanson; Burra Burra
Blyth	District Council of Clare	Hanson; Burra Burra; Stanley; Robertstown
Hall; Blyth	Upper Wakefield; Auburn; Saddleworth; Saddleworth and Auburn	Upper Wakefield; Stanley; Robertstown

The Corporation and District Council of Clare were twin local government areas in South Australia centred on the town of Clare. The district council existed from 1853 until 1997, while the town corporation existed from 1868 until 1969.

== History ==
The District Council of Clare was proclaimed in 1853 and the council area was specified as the entirety of the hundreds of Clare and the Upper Wakefield. The inaugural councillors were Edward Gleeson, founder of Clare, William Slater, Dr. Charles Webb, Anton Sotolowsky and Patrick Butler.

The following year, in October 1854, the District Council of Upper Wakefield seceded from Clare district to provide dedicated local government to the Hundred of Upper Wakefield.

In April 1868, the township of Mintaro in the south east of the district seceded from Clare to form part of the new District Council of Stanley. Later that year the township of Clare also seceded from the district as the Corporation of Clare. The corporation was a separate local government body working closely with the district council for just over 100 years before the two civic bodies rejoined in 1969.

In 1932 the district council annexed the District Council of Stanley to the south east, and three years later annexed the northerly adjacent Hundred of Milne from the abolished District Council of Hutt and Hill Rivers. In 1936 the corporate township was reported as being 500 acres (200 ha) in size while the surrounding district, which was to remain stable in extent for more than a half century, was reported as being 162,000 acres (660 km^{2}).

In 1997 Clare council amalgamated with the District Council of Saddleworth and Auburn and District Council of Riverton to the south to form the new District Council of Clare and Gilbert Valleys.
