= Anama, South Australia =

Anama South Australia
- Coordinates: 33.6898°S 138.5674°E
- Population: 7 (SAL 2021)
- Postcode(s): 5464
- Location: 18 km (11 mi) north of Clare
- LGA(s): District Council of Clare and Gilbert Valleys
- Region: Mid North
- County: Stanley
- State electorate(s): Frome
- Federal division(s): Grey
Localities around Anama:
Marola	Euromina	Andrews
Marola	Anama	Hilltown
Hart	Bungaree	Barinia

Anama is a locality in the Mid North region of South Australia, north of Clare. It was the name of a pastoral run in the early days of the colony and continues as the name of the cattle stud in the same place. It was part of the Bungaree Station owned by George Charles Hawker and remains in the same family, five generations later. After George Hawker had died, his surviving sons divided the property in 1906, and Anama became the property of Walter Hawker.

In the early days of white settlement in South Australia, pastoral runs in the "waste lands" (not surveyed for agriculture) could be registered based on rough descriptions of natural features. As the colony grew, the squatters' runs were called in by the government and the land was surveyed into smaller lots and auctioned to farmers. Some of this land was also bought freehold by the former squatters to continue their pastoral activities as well as branching into cereal crops and more intensive agriculture.

The Anama run was offered for sale in 1861 by James C Hawker acting as executor for the estate of Charles Lloyd Hawker. At that time, it included: "20,002 SHEEP. 37 HORSES. 30 CATTLE. 140 SQUARE MILES IN THE RUN. 3,156 ACRES PURCHASED LAND. 720 ACRES OF PADDOCK, FENCED IN. The RUN is WELL WATERED by the RIVER BROUGHTON, which runs through the centre of the Run. Also by the ANAMA CREEK." The Broughton River is now further north than the modern locality of Anama, which surrounds the original homestead. The boundaries of the current Bounded Locality of Anama were set in January 2001.

There was a government town named Anama 7 kilometres (4.3 mi) southwest of the modern locality of Anama on the boundary of Hart and Rochester. Surveyed in 1865, but never proclaimed or developed, it officially ceased to exist in 1924. Similar to the modern locality, the 1865 town was named for the pastoral run owned by George Hawker.

== See also ==
- District Council of Hutt and Hill Rivers
