= Hundred of Stow =

Stow
- Cadastral division
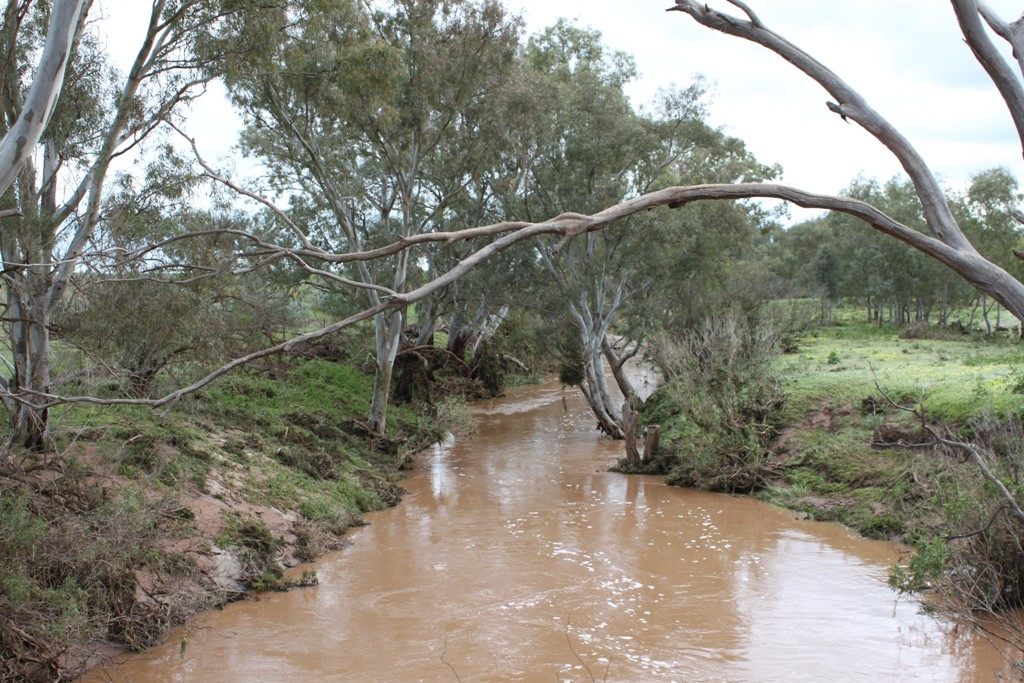
- Wakefield River in flood on the south border of the hundred at Whitwarta

- Coordinates: 34.05°S 138.36°E
- Country: Australia
- State: South Australia
- Region: Mid North
- LGA(s): Wakefield
- Established: 26 June 1862

Area
  - Total: 150 km^{2} (56 sq mi)
- County: Stanley
Lands administrative divisions around Stow
Everard	Everard	Blyth
Goyder	Stow	Hall
Inkerman	Balaklava	Dalkey

The Hundred of Stow is the cadastral unit of hundred on the northern Adelaide Plains. It is one of the 16 hundreds of the County of Stanley. It was named in 1867 by Governor Dominick Daly after Randolph Isham Stow (1828–1878), twice Attorney-General of South Australia. Parts of the localities of Mount Templeton, Stow, Whitwarta, Watchman and Balaklava are within the hundred.

== Local government ==
On 14 November 1878, the entire Hundred of Stow was annexed to the District Council of Balaklava along with an eastern strip of the Hundred of Goyder, following petitioning by resident landowners.

The hundred was locally governed by District Council of Wakefield Plains from 1983 following the amalgamation of Balaklava council with Port Wakefield and Owen councils. In 1997 the merger of Wakefield Plains and Blyth-Snowtown councils brought hundred under the governance of Wakefield Regional Council with the North ward and Central ward boundary passing east to west through the middle of the hundred.

== See also ==
- Lands administrative divisions of South Australia
