= Booyoolie =

Booyoolie may refer to:

- Hundred of Booyoolie, a cadastral division in the Mid North of South Australia
  - Gladstone, South Australia, formerly known as the Government Town of Booyoolie
  - District Council of Booyoolie a historic local government body associated with the hundred
