= District Council of Laura =

Former local government area of South Australia from 1932 to 1988

Coordinates: 33°11′S 138°18′E

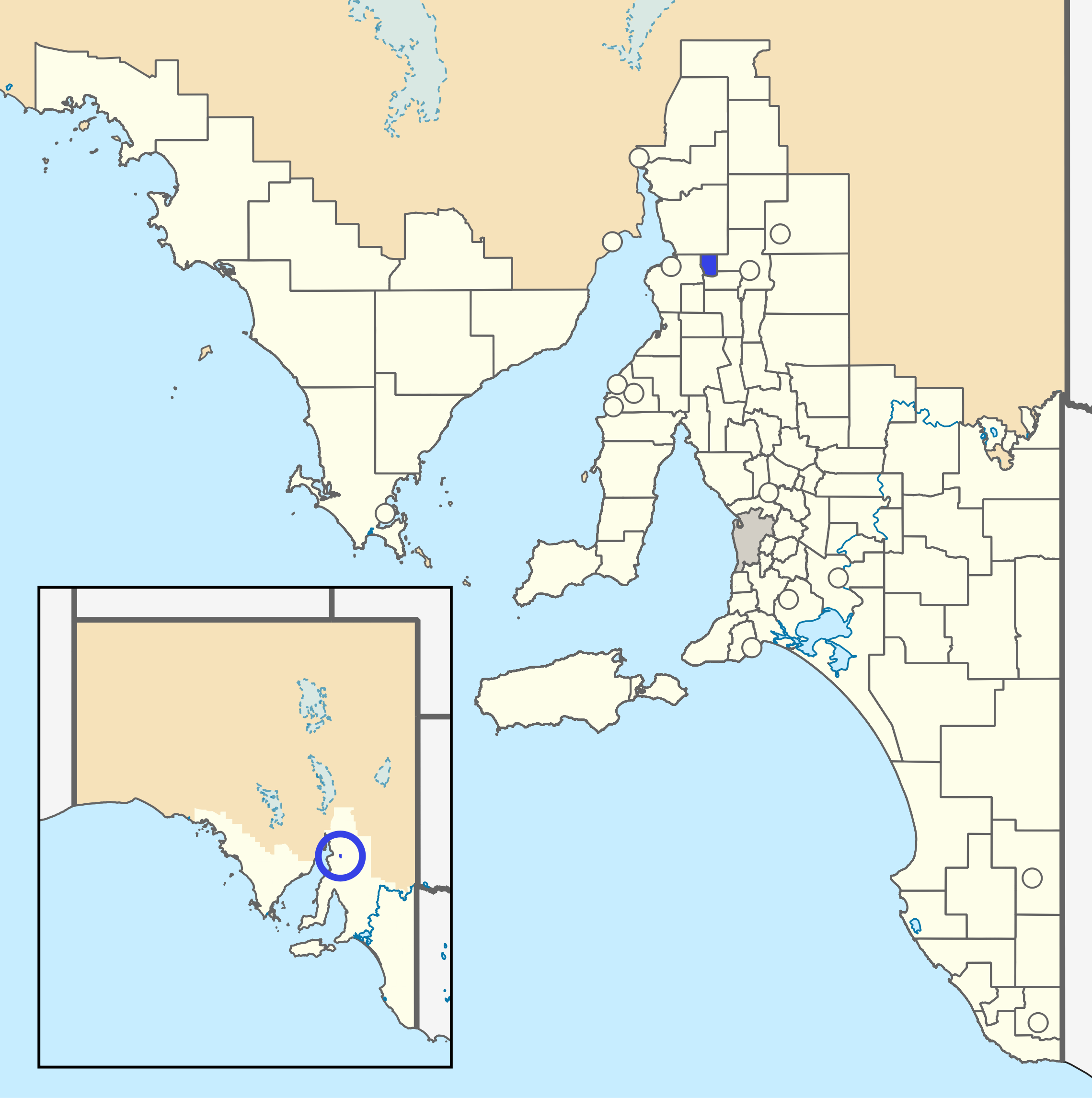
The District Council of Laura as it was prior to disestablishment (blue)

The District Council of Laura was a local government area in South Australia. It was created on 1 May 1932 with the amalgamation of the Corporate Town of Laura and the District Council of Booyoolie. It reunited the whole cadastral Hundred of Booyoolie within the same district council, as had previously been the case when the Booyoolie council was first proclaimed in 1876. The Laura merger had occurred after a much broader 1931 merger proposal, which would have seen the Corporate Town of Laura, District Council of Gladstone, Corporate Town of Gladstone and District Council of Caltowie merge into a drastically enlarged District Council of Booyoolie, was abandoned after meeting strong opposition from both the Laura and Gladstone communities.

The council chambers were initially located in the Laura Town Hall, which had formerly been the Laura Institute. It was divided into six wards, each electing one councillor: East Laura, North Laura and West Laura Wards in Laura itself, and South (later Pine Creek), Stone Hut and Whyte Cliff Wards in the rural areas. The council area had a total population of 1,062 persons in 1936. The earlier town hall was replaced by a new Civic Centre in 1968. Amongst the council's later projects was a 1980s-era collaboration with the South Australian Housing Trust to build a number of pensioner cottages in the town. The council ceased to exist on 1 May 1988 when it merged with the District Council of Georgetown and the District Council of Gladstone to form the short-lived District Council of Rocky River.

== Chairmen ==
- John Leo Kennedy (1932)
- John Holbeach Acott (1922-1933)
- George Edwin Cleggett (1933-1936)
- John Leo Kennedy (1936-1939)
- George William Smith (1939-1943)
- Victor Walter Blesing (1944-1948)
- Charles Amey (1948-1953)
- Louis Ernest Karger (1953-1954)
- Charles Amey (1954-1956)
- Charles Leonard Smith (1956-1957)
- William Mark Coe Weston (1957-1960)
- Norman Theodore Pech (1960-1966)
- George William Paxton Smith (1966-1967)
- Brian Robert Middlemiss (1967-1973)
- Vernon William Charles Taylor (1973-1977)
- Max Erwin Zanker (1977-1982)
- Peter Edwin Hill (1982-1983)
- Allan Glen Woolford (1983-?)
