= Hart, South Australia =

Hart
- Town
- Coordinates: 33°45′23″S 138°26′20″E
- Country: Australia
- State: South Australia
- LGA: Wakefield Regional Council
- Location: 8 km (5.0 mi) south of Brinkworth; 11 km (6.8 mi) north of Blyth; 20 km (12 mi) northwest of Clare; 24 km (15 mi) east of Snowtown; 146 km (91 mi) north of Adelaide

Government
  - State electorate: Electoral district of Frome
  - Federal division: Division of Grey
- Elevation: 182 m (597 ft)

Population
  - Total: 45 (2016 census)
- Postcode: 5464
Localities around Hart
	Brinkworth, Rochester	Marola, Anama
Condowie	Hart	Bungaree
	Blyth	Benbournie

Hart is a locality in the Mid North region of South Australia. The boundaries were formalised in January 2000 for the long established name for the area. There was a railway siding at Hart on the Gladstone railway line. The major industry in the area is cereal crop growing.

== Name ==
The Hundred of Hart (part of the cadastral system in South Australia) was proclaimed in 1864 and named after Captain John Hart, a member of the colony's parliament and the Treasurer at the time (and later Premier).

== Geography ==
The Hundred of Hart lies on the plains and western slope of the Yackamoorundie Range (known as the Middle Range at the time the Hundred was proclaimed). The eastern boundary of the Hundred is about 11 1/4 miles (18.1 km) along the crest of the range, mostly above 400 metres (1,300 ft) altitude, running roughly north–south. The southern boundary is part of the northern boundary of the Hundred of Blyth. The northern and western boundaries were arbitrary straight lines running true west and true south. The northern boundary is about 8 1/2 miles (13.7 km) long. The western boundary is now mostly followed by a road, which includes the main street of Brinkworth and is below 200 metres (660 ft) altitude. The current Bounded Locality of Hart occupies almost the southern half of the Hundred.

There was a Government Town named Anama surveyed in 1865, which was not fully developed, and officially ceased to exist in 1924. It was named for a local property owned by George Charles Hawker, near what is now the boundary of Hart and Rochester, both in the Hundred of Hart. The railway station may have been named for this Government Town on some maps, rather than for the Hundred district it was in.

== School and church ==
Hart previously had a school which operated from 1895 to 1922. One of the notable former pupils was Sir Lyell McEwin, who had been born in the area. The residents of the district had been petitioning the government to provide a school, however they eventually erected a stone building to serve as a community hall, for uses including a public school and religious worship.

The Annie McEwin Snow Presbyterian Memorial Church opened in 1923. It was named in honour of Alexander Lyell McEwin Snr's daughter who had died after a brief illness, aged only 30. Construction was funded by him and her father-in-law. It stands adjacent to the Hart hall which had also been the school. It closed in 1976 and is now a private residence.

== Hart Field Site ==
Hart Field Site is a 40-hectare (99-acre) agronomic field trial site where broadacre crops and cropping techniques are tested. The site is owned by the Hart Field-Site Group, established as a committee in 1982. The group bought this permanent site in 2000 with the financial support of Wakefield Regional Council, the group having previously used privately owned land near the current site.
