= District Council of Gladstone =

Former local government area of South Australia

Coordinates: 33°16′0″S 138°21′00″E

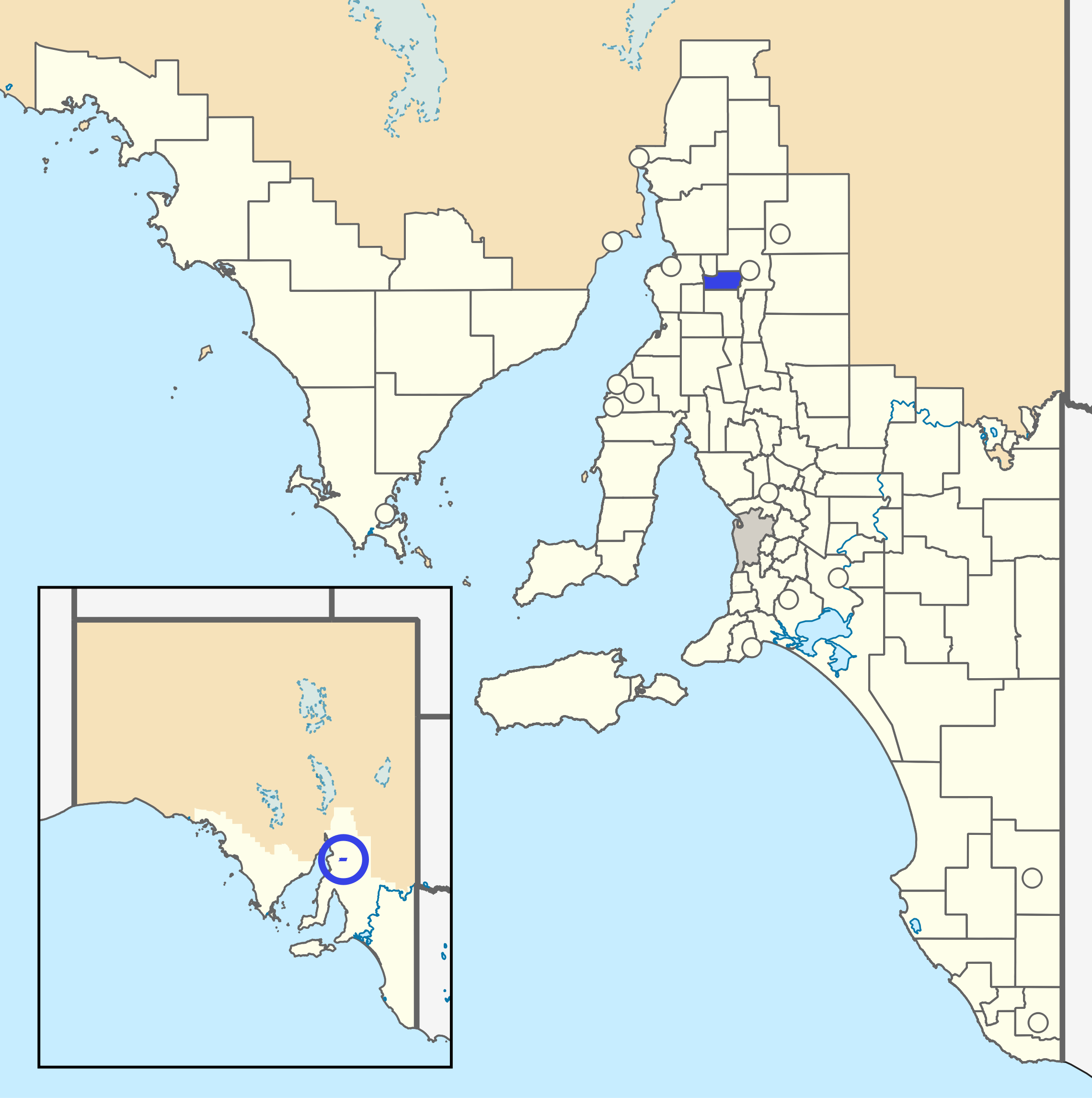
The District Council of Gladstone as it was prior to disestablishment (blue)

The District Council of Gladstone was a local government area in South Australia. It was proclaimed on 10 August 1876 as the District Council of Yangya, named for the cadastral Hundred of Yangya, but was renamed Gladstone after its main town on 14 August 1879. Gladstone had been built as a private township very close to the hundred boundary, and the adjacent government township of Booyoolie, built not long after, was in the adjacent Hundred of Booyoolie, and formed as the separate District Council of Booyoolie, dividing the twin towns (later merged into modern Gladstone in 1939) into two separate municipalities based on their respective hundreds. It gained the Booyoolie township from that council in 1879, and acquired the remainder of what had been the southern portion of the Booyoolie council on 12 August 1880. It then gained the remainder of the Hundred of Yangya under the District Councils Act 1887.

A ward system was first introduced in 1881, with three wards (Gladstone, Eastern and Western) each electing two councillors. The town of Gladstone separated as the Corporate Town of Gladstone on 8 March 1883, and the Gladstone ward was dropped. It regained the town of Gladstone in 1933 when the Corporate Town was amalgamated back into the District Council. The post-1933 ward structure saw three town wards (North, East and West) and four rural wards (Manatoo, Rocky River, Yackamoorundie and Yangya). In 1939, it purchased the assets of the Gladstone Institute, whose trustees had been unable to fund the cost of continued maintenance. The institute library operated until 1983, when it was replaced by the Flinders Mobile Library, an initiative of several surrounding councils. The council ceased to exist in 1988 when it merged with the District Council of Georgetown and the District Council of Laura to form the District Council of Rocky River.

== Chairmen ==
- G. M. Growden (1887)
- H. W. Hughes (1889)
- E. Cue (1893)
- G. Flavel (1913)
- A. B. Blesing (1925–1926)
- William Stanley Bennett (1928–1938)
- John Frederick O'Neill (1938–1946)
- Charles Hurtle Lines (1946–1947)
- Jonathan Wyatt Prior (1947–1952)
- Arthur Roy Treasure (1952–1963)
- Harry Tancred Harslett (1963–1965)
- Stanley Kenton Moore (1965–1972)
- Robert Edgar Heaslip (1972–1973)
- Garth Lorimore Zerbe (1973–1977)
- Donald Ian Blesing (1977–1978)
- Triantaphylos Vasios (1978–1980)
- Garth Lorimore Zerbe (1980–1981)
- Melville Jonathan Prior (1981–?)
