= District Council of Hutt and Hill Rivers =

Former local government area in South Australia

The District Council of Hutt and Hill Rivers was a local government area in South Australia. It was established on 30 July 1885 and included the entirety of the Hundred of Milne as well as the south half of the Hundred of Andrews. It gained the Hundred of Hart in January 1888 following the passage of the District Councils Act 1887. The municipality had no township within its boundaries, so a council chambers was built at Bungaree; the building survives today and is used for tourist accommodation. In 1909, a section was severed and added to the District Council of Snowtown. It was abolished in 1935 following a Local Government Commission report that advocated cutting the number of municipalities in South Australia from 196 to 142, with Hutt and Hill Rivers being divided between the adjacent District Council of Spalding (Hundred of Andrews south portion), District Council of Clare (Hundred of Milne) and the remainder (Hundred of Hart) to the District Council of Blyth.

== Chairmen ==
- James Maitland (1897–1899)
- S. K. Walker (1901)
- John Noble (1904–1908)
- Alexander Lyell McEwin (1910, 1918)
- F. F. Chomley (1935)

== See also ==
- District Council of Spalding
