= District Council of Booyoolie =

Former local government area of South Australia

Coordinates: 33°11′00″S 138°18′00″E

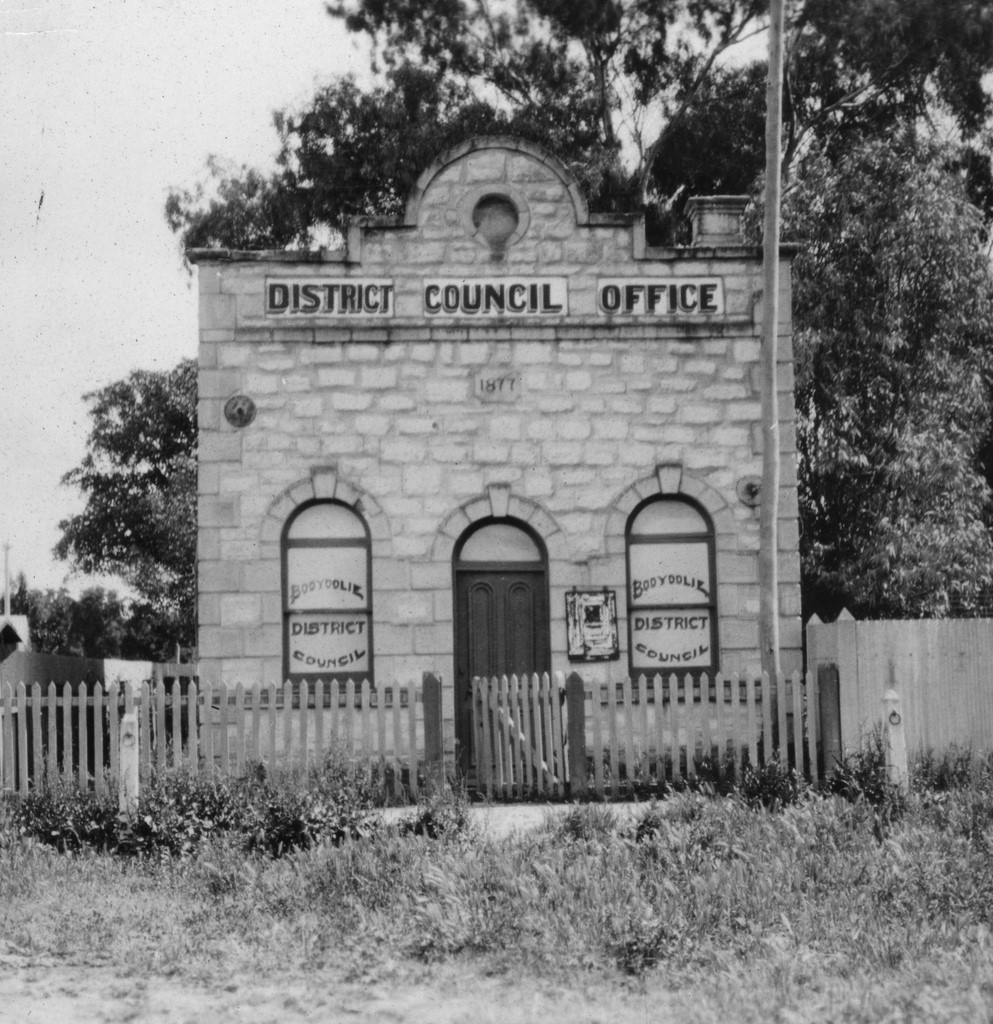
The 1877 council office, c. 1936

The District Council of Booyoolie was a local government area in South Australia. It was proclaimed on 2 March 1876 and comprised the entire cadastral Hundred of Booyoolie. It included at its inception the government town of Booyoolie (which had been built on the opposite side of the railway line from the private township of Gladstone), North Gladstone, Laura and Stone Hut. It was divided into five wards (North, South, Central, Lower and Booyoolie), each electing one councillor. In September 1876, the council decided to construct a council office and chamber at Laura.

The township of Booyoolie was severed and annexed by the District Council of Yangya in 1879, and the broader southern portion of the council was added to the renamed District Council of Gladstone on 12 August 1880, in each case following representations from local residents. Having already been substantially reduced in size by the Gladstone area changes, the district lost a significant portion of its remaining ratepayers when the township of Laura separated as the Corporate Town of Laura on 22 June 1882, leaving it representing a nearly entirely rural area. As their office fell within the boundaries of the new Laura municipality, it was the subject of a dispute over its ownership; however, the Booyoolie council continued to meet at Laura. The Booyoolie council would operate out of a Herbert Street office for many years, but by the 1920s, the council offices were located in Hughes Street, opposite the Laura Courthouse.

A 1931 amalgamation proposal suggested that the Corporate Town of Laura, the District Council of Gladstone, the Corporate Town of Gladstone and part of the District Council of Caltowie should merge into a drastically larger Booyoolie council; however, this was abandoned following local opposition. The council ceased to exist on 1 May 1932 when, in a much smaller merger, it was amalgamated with the Corporate Town of Laura to form the District Council of Laura.

== Chairmen ==
- John Cook (1876–1877)
- T. W. Higgins (1916–1917)
- J. F. Heath (1920–1921)
- R. Cleggett (1925)
- A. A. Holland (1928)
- C. Amey (1930–1932)
