= District Council of Balaklava =

District Council of Balaklava South Australia
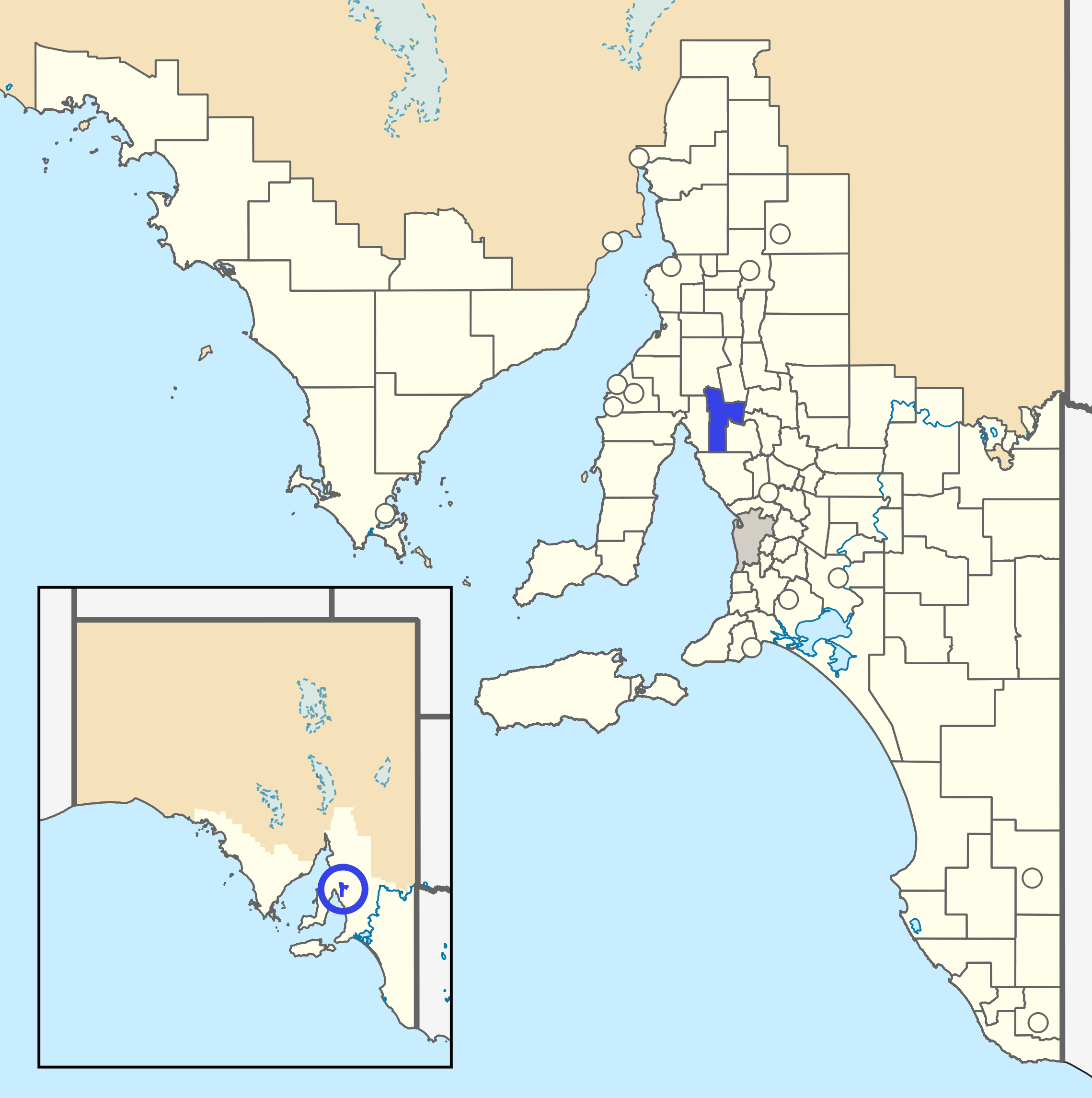
- The District Councl of Balaklava as it was prior to disestablishment
- Coordinates: 34°08′46″S 138°24′47″E
- Established: 1877
- Abolished: 1983
- Council seat: Balaklava
- State electorate(s): Wooroora
LGAs around District Council of Balaklava:
Snowtown; Port Wakefield	Snowtown	Blyth; Hall; Auburn; Saddleworth and Auburn
Port Wakefield	District Council of Balaklava	Dalkey
Dublin; Mallala	Dublin; Mallala	Grace; Mallala

The District Council of Balaklava was a local government area seated at Balaklava in South Australia from 1877 to 1983.

== History ==
The District Council of Balaklava was officially proclaimed as incorporating the entire Hundred of Balaklava on 20 December 1877. The council was divided into five wards: Township, East, North, West and South. The five inaugural councillors appointed on the date of the proclamation were John Verco, J.P. (Township ward), August Winter (East ward), George Hicks (North ward), Samuel Alderman (West ward), and Robert Frederick Ware (South ward).

On 14 November 1878, the entire Hundred of Stow was annexed to the Balaklava council along with an eastern strip of the Hundred of Goyder, following petitioning by resident landowners.

In 1911 a part of the western ward of Watchman's Plains was severed from the District Council of Hall and annexed by Balaklava council.

In 1912, at the instigation of resident landowners, a southern portion of the Hundred of Everard south of Everard Road and including the Everard Central township, was severed from the District Council of Snowtown and added to the Balaklava council as part of its Stow ward.

In 1935 Balaklava council gained the new wards of Halbury and Wakefield in the south half of the Hundred of Hall from the defunct Hall council as part of the statewide consolidation of local government bodies that occurred that year.

In 1983 the Balaklava council ceased to exist when it amalgamated with the councils of Port Wakefield and Owen to form the District Council of Wakefield Plains, but the council seat remained in the town of Balaklava.

== Neighbouring local government ==
The following adjacent local government bodies co-existed with the Balaklava council:

- District Council of Snowtown (established 1888) lay immediately north from 1889, when the Hundred of Everard was annexed by that council, and north west from 1890 when the Hundred of Cameron was also annexed by that council.
- District Council of Blyth (established 1872) lay north east from 1878 when the Hundred of Stow was annexed to Balaklava council, stretching the boundary much further north.
- The District Council of Hall also lay north east across the Wakefield River from its establishment in 1878. From 1935, following the annexation by Balaklava of the south parts of the Hall council, the District Council of Auburn, later the District Council of Saddleworth and Auburn, lay north east.
- District Council of Dalkey (established 1875), later the District Council of Owen lay immediately east, the latter amalgamating with Balaklava in 1983.
- District Council of Grace (established 1874) lay south east until in 1935 it became part of the District Council of Mallala (initially called District Council of Light and much later called Adelaide Plains Council).
- District Council of Dublin (established 1873) lay south and south west until it became part of the District Council of Mallala in 1935.
- District Council of Port Wakefield lay west and north west from its establishment in 1878 until amalgamating with Balaklava in 1983.
