= Hundred of Clare =

Clare
- Cadastral division
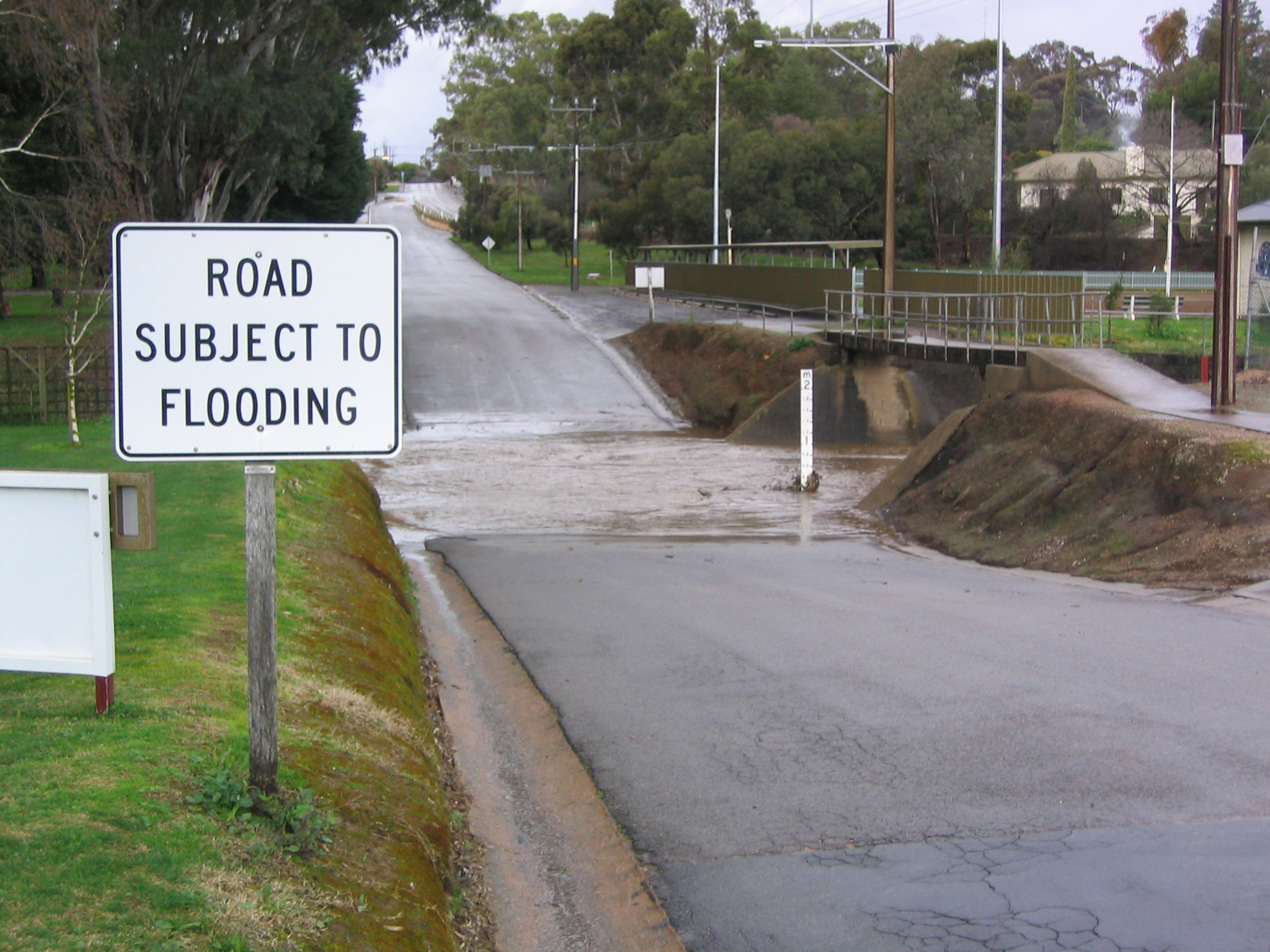
- Flooded street in Clare

- Coordinates: 33.85°S 138.64°E
- Country: Australia
- State: South Australia
- Region: Mid North
- LGA(s): Clare and Gilbert Valleys
- Established: 1850

Area
  - Total: 280 km^{2} (110 sq mi)
- County: Stanley
Lands administrative divisions around Clare
Hart	Milne	Hanson
Blyth	Clare	Hanson; Stanley
Hall	Upper Wakefield	Stanley

The Hundred of Clare is a cadastral unit of hundred in the northern Mount Lofty Ranges centred on the town of Clare. It is one of the 16 hundreds of the County of Stanley.

== History ==
The hundred was proclaimed in 1850 by Governor Henry Young and named after the existing locality of Clare, itself named by Edward Burton Gleeson in 1838 after his home, County Clare in Ireland.

The first local government within the hundred was the District Council of Clare, established in 1853. The township seceded from the district council as a corporate municipality in 1868, only to re-amalgamate with the district just over a hundred years later, in 1969. Ultimately the hundred became part of the much larger District Council of Clare and Gilbert Valleys by amalgamation in 1997 with district councils to the south.

== Localities ==
Apart from Clare itself, the following localities and towns of the Clare and Gilbert Valleys council area are situated inside (or largely inside) the bounds of the hundred: Armagh, Benbournie, Boconnoc Park, Emu Flat, Gillentown, Hill River (most part), Penwortham, Polish Hill River, Spring Farm, Sevenhill, Spring Gully and Stanley Flat (most part).

== See also ==
- Lands administrative divisions of South Australia
