= Brinkworth, South Australia =

Brinkworth
- Town
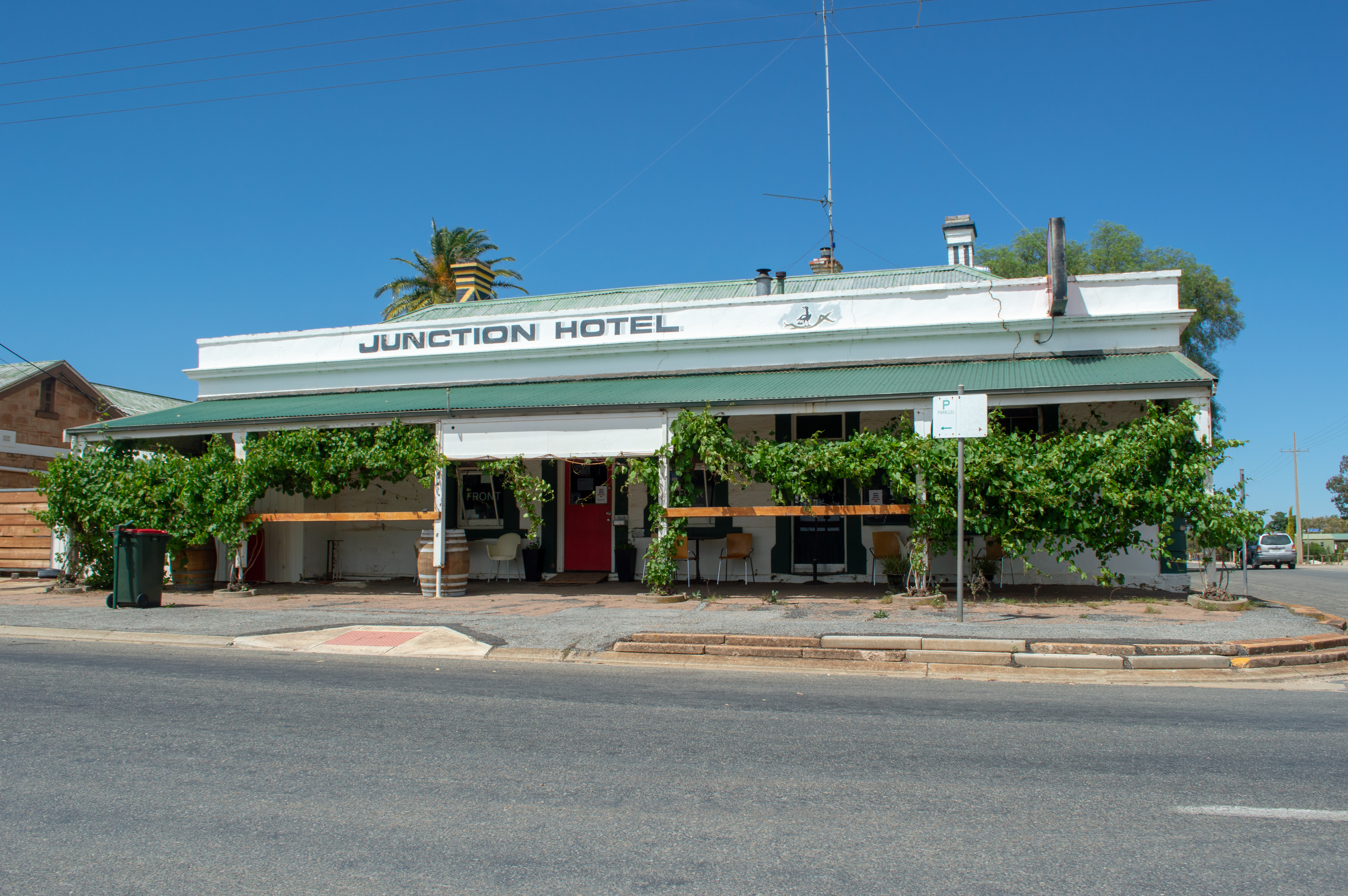
- The Junction Hotel, Brinkworth

- Coordinates: 33°41′0″S 138°24′0″E
- Country: Australia
- State: South Australia
- LGA: Wakefield Regional Council
- Location: 19 km (12 mi) north of Blyth; 21 km (13 mi) NE of Snowtown; 31 km (19 mi) NW of Clare; 55 km (34 mi) south of Gladstone; 153 km (95 mi) north of Adelaide
- Established: 1892

Government
  - State electorate: Narungga
  - Federal division: Grey
- Elevation: 122 m (400 ft)

Population
  - Total: 401 (2016 census)
- Postcode: 5464
Localities around Brinkworth
Lake View	Koolunga; Yacka	Marola
Burnsfield	Brinkworth	Rochester
Condowie	Blyth	Hart

Brinkworth (postcode 5464) is a town in the Mid North region of South Australia with a current population of 243. It is 31 km (19 mi) north west of the regional centre of Clare.

The Brinkworth area was first settled in the 1860s and the town laid out in 1892. Brinkworth is named after the early landowner, George Brinkworth.

== Transport ==
Brinkworth was a junction on the Gladstone railway line from Hamley Bridge to Gladstone in the north. The other line from Brinkworth went through Snowtown to Kadina and Wallaroo. Both were originally built as narrow gauge 1,067 mm (3 ft 6 in). These lines were converted to broad gauge 1,600 mm (5 ft 3 in) in 1927. The Hamley Bridge-Gladstone railway line closed in May 1988. The remaining Kadina-Brinkworth railway line closed in March 1993. The railway lines and yards have since been demolished.

== Governance ==
Brinkworth is in the local government area of Wakefield Regional Council, the state electoral district of Narungga and the federal division of Grey.
