= Condowie, South Australia =

Condowie South Australia
- Coordinates: 33°44′1″S 138°19′48″E
- Population: 62 (2016 census)
- Postcode(s): 5464
- Location: 135 km (84 mi) N of Adelaide; 23 km (14 mi) NE of Lake Bumbunga
- LGA(s): Wakefield Regional Council
- State electorate(s): Frome
- Federal division(s): Grey
Localities around Condowie:
Burnsfield		Brinkworth
Snowtown	Condowie	Hart
Bumbunga	Everard Central	Blyth

Condowie is a locality in South Australia's Mid North. The locality is named for an Aboriginal word meaning "good water".

Condowie was a stop on the Brinkworth–Kadina railway line which opened in 1894 and closed in 1990. It was midway between Snowtown and Brinkworth.

== See also ==
- List of cities and towns in South Australia
