= District Council of Rocky River =

District Council of Rocky River South Australia
- Coordinates: 33°16′0″S 138°21′0″E
- Established: 1988
- Abolished: 1997
- Council seat: Gladstone
LGAs around District Council of Rocky River:
| Port Germein; Mount Remarkable | Port Germein; Mount Remarkable | Jamestown |
| Crystal Brook-Redhill | District Council of Rocky River | Jamestown; Spalding |
| Blyth-Snowtown | Blyth-Snowtown | Clare |

The District Council of Rocky River was a local government area in South Australia from 1988 to 1997, seated at Gladstone.

== History ==
The council came into existence on 1 May 1988 with the amalgamation of the District Council of Georgetown, District Council of Gladstone and District Council of Laura. It had nine members divided amongst three wards (Georgetown, Gladstone and Laura), each returning three councillors. It was relatively short-lived, as on 3 May 1997 it merged with the District Council of Jamestown and the District Council of Spalding to create the Northern Areas Council. Its principal office was located in Gladstone.

== See also ==
- Rocky River (South Australia)
