= Corporate Town of Gladstone =

Local government area in South Australia

Coordinates: 33°16′0″S 138°21′0″E

The Corporate Town of Gladstone was a local government area in South Australia, centred on the town of Gladstone. It was proclaimed on 8 March 1883, separating the township from the surrounding District Council of Gladstone. It was divided into three wards at its inception (North, East and West), each represented by two councillors. In 1923, it covered an area of 2,243 acres, with a capital value of £137,740. In 1924, it transferred ownership of the Town Hall and the Soldiers' Memorial to the Gladstone Institute. It ceased to exist on 15 May 1933 when it merged back into the District Council. It was expressed at the time that there was local regret at the loss of the distinct town council, but that a decline in rates and reductions in state government expenditure had made it a necessity.

== Mayors ==
- Oliver Horner (1883–1884)
- J. J. Bonnar (1884–1885)
- C. W. Hamilton (1885–1886)
- B. J. Knight (1886–1889)
- R. McDougall (1889–1891)
- A. C. Catt (1891–1895)
- H. Crabb (1895–1896)
- D. Coe (1896–1897)
- W. Hancock (1897–1902)
- J. R. Creber (1902–1904)
- C. Budge (1904–1905)
- P. R. Lee (1905)
- W. Odgers (1906–1909)
- C. H. Chancellor (1909–1910)
- J. H. Sargent (1910–1912)
- J. A. Gallasch (1912–1913)
- J. Eley (1913–1914)
- Walter Langdon Parsons (1914–1916)
- F. C. Grubb (1916–1917)
- E. A. Gale (1917–1920)
- R. E. Lines (1920–1921)
- E. A. Gale (1921–1923)
- W. Odgers (1923–1924)
- C. O. Bennett (1924–1927)
- H. T. Harslett (1927–1929)
- J. W. MacNamee (1929–1932)
- F. C. Grubb (1932–1933)
