= District Council of Port Wakefield =

District Council of Port Wakefield South Australia
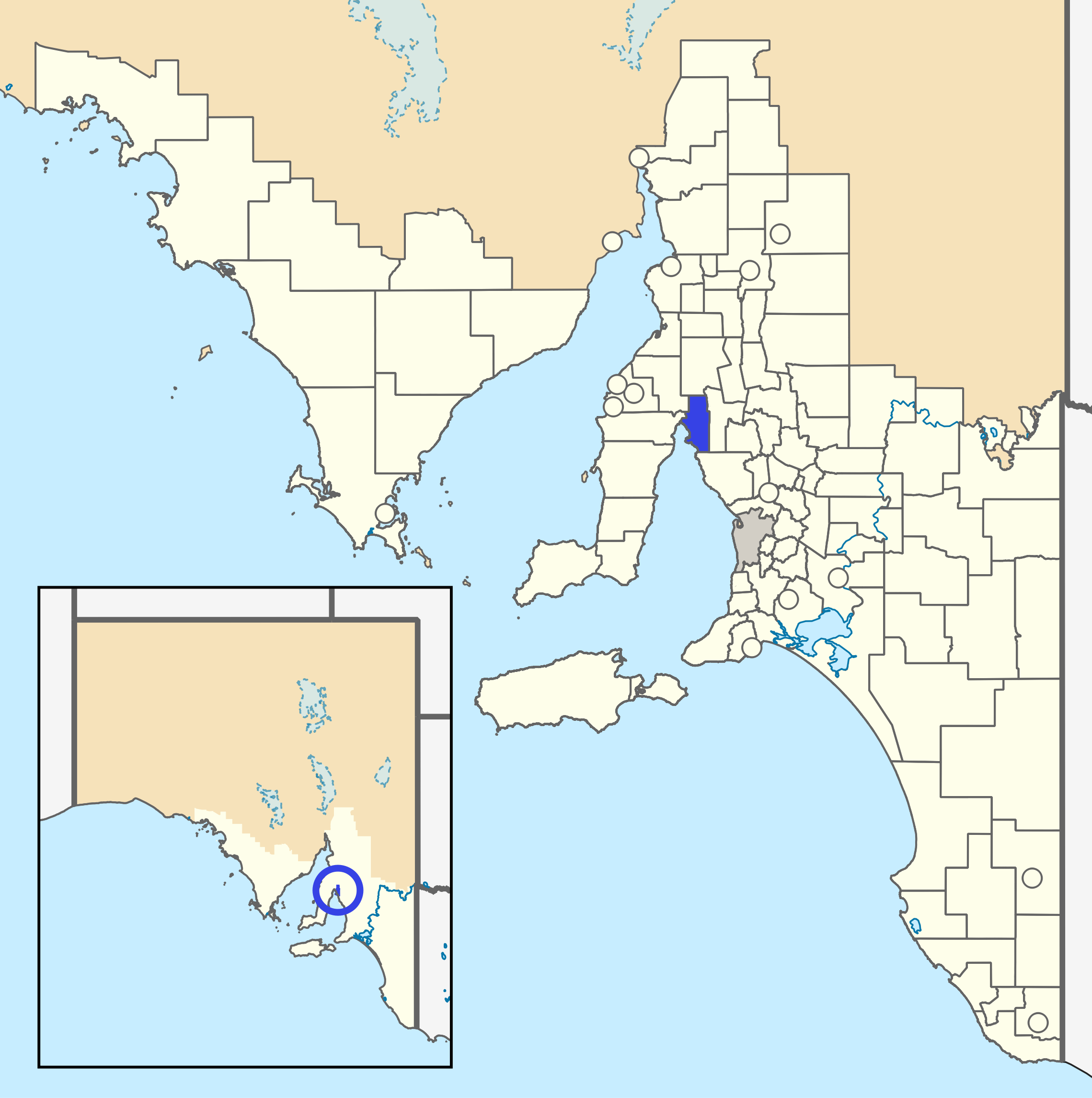
- The District Council of Port Wakefield as it was prior to disestablishment (blue)
- Coordinates: 34°11′02″S 138°09′01″E
- Established: 1878
- Abolished: 1983
- Council seat: Port Wakefield
LGAs around District Council of Port Wakefield:
| Kulpara (1878-1932); Ninnes/Bute (1932-1983) | Snowtown (1888-1983) | Blyth (1888); Snowtown (1888-1983) |
| Clinton (1878-1983) | District Council of Port Wakefield | Balaklava |
| Dublin; Mallala | Dublin (1878-1935); Mallala (1935-1983) | Dublin (1878-1935); Mallala (1935-1983) |

The District Council of Port Wakefield was a local government area seated at Port Wakefield in South Australia from 1878 to 1983.

== History ==
The District Council of Port Wakefield was officially proclaimed along with its new neighbouring councils, Kulpara and Clinton, on 28 November 1878. It incorporated the entire Hundred of Inkerman as well as the western two thirds of the Hundred of Goyder and a small coastal portion of the Hundred of Clinton near the Wakefield port. The five inaugural councillors appointed on the date of the proclamation were John Rumble, John Smart, Richard Forrest, George Mayfield, and George F. Mills.

In 1888 the council annexed the previously unincorporated Hundred of Cameron as part of the District Councils Act 1887, but it was severed and annexed by the Snowtown council just two years later.

In 1983 the Port Wakefield council ceased to exist when it amalgamated with the councils of Balaklava and Owen to form the District Council of Wakefield Plains.

== Neighbouring local government ==
The following adjacent local government bodies co-existed with the Port Wakefield council:

- District Council of Snowtown lay immediately north from its establishment in 1888 and north east from its annexation of the Hundred of Everard in 1889, the District Council of Blyth having laid north east of Port Wakefield council for the year of 1888.
- The District Council of Balaklava lay immediately east until amalgamating with Port Wakefield council in 1983.
- District Council of Dublin (established 1873) lay south and south east until it became part of the District Council of Light, later called Mallala council, in 1935.
- District Council of Clinton (established 1878 at the same time as Port Wakefield) lay west of the boundary near the town of Port Wakefield.
- District Council of Kulpara (established 1878 at the same time as Port Wakefield) lay north west. From 1932, following the annexation of the eastern part of the Hundred of Kulpara by the District Council of Ninnes (later called District Council of Bute), the latter lay north west.
