= District Council of Georgetown =

Coordinates: 33°22′0″S 138°24′0″E

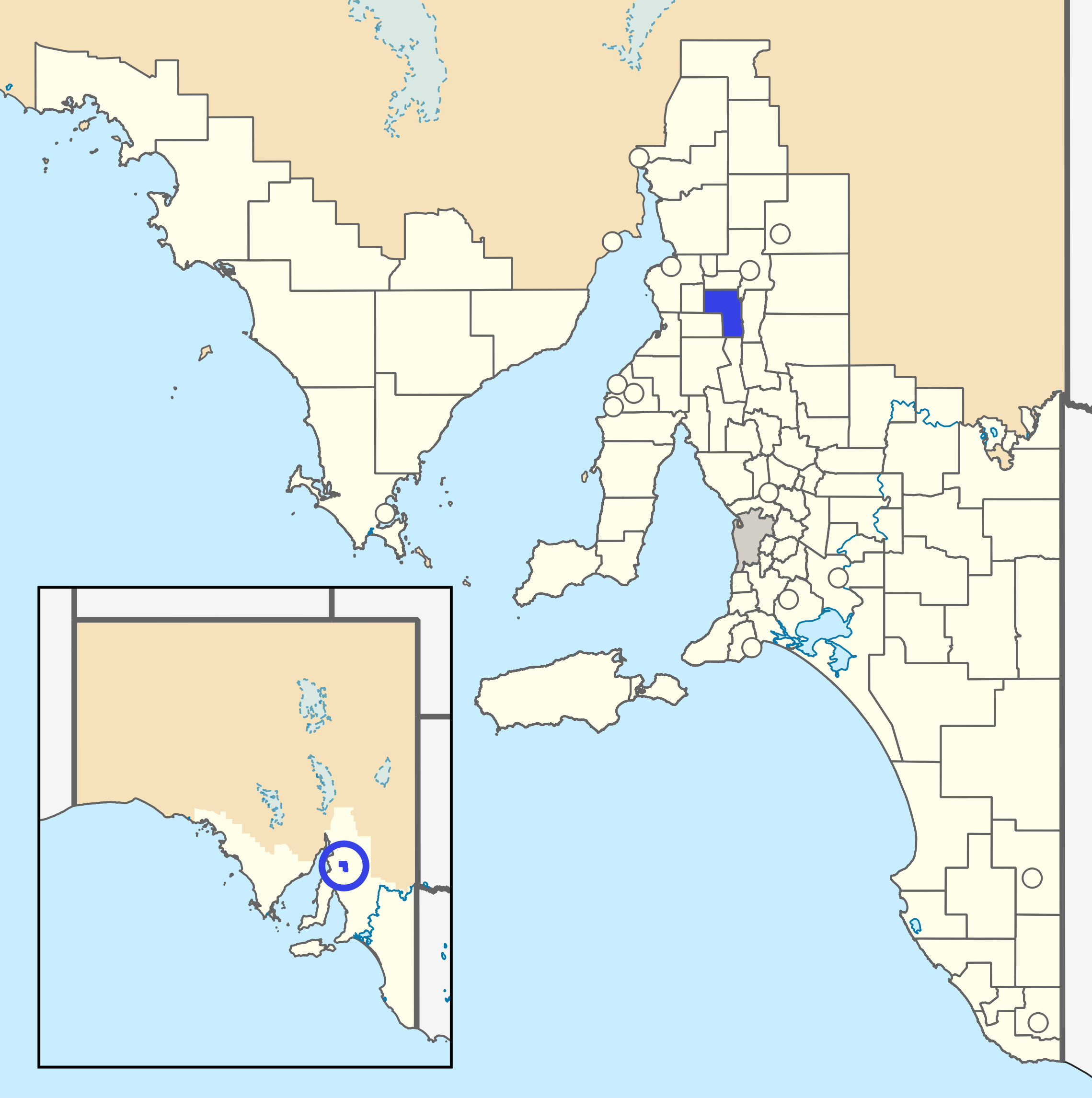
The District Council of Georgetown as it was prior to disestablishment (blue)

The District Council of Georgetown was a local government area in South Australia, centred on the town of Georgetown.

== History ==
It was proclaimed on 2 March 1876 as the District Council of George Town, encompassing the cadastral Hundred of Bundaleer. The District Councils Act 1887 expanded the council in two directions by amalgamating the District Council of Narridy (incorporating the Hundred of Narridy) to the west and annexing the Hundred of Yackamoorundie to the south. All three hundreds had been proclaimed in 1869 following the passage of the Strangways Land Act opening those lands up for closer settlement. It was subdivided into three wards later in 1888 (Georgetown, Narridy and Yacka). A redistribution of the ward system in 1921 created a fourth ward (Gulnare).

By 1936, the council controlled an area of 260 square miles, including what the Civic Record described as "some of the finest cereal-growing areas in South Australia". It was responsible for 360 miles of roads within the district in that year, including 32 miles of main roads. It had also undertaken beautification schemes in Georgetown and Yacka, including plantations of gum trees. A new council chambers was built in 1958, replacing an earlier building, followed by the construction of a council depot in 1968. The council was also involved in providing new community halls at Georgetown and Gulnare, as well as a range of recreation facilities at Georgetown, Gulnare and Yacka.

The Georgetown area declined in significance throughout the twentieth century, and the council ceased to exist in 1988 when it amalgamated with the District Council of Gladstone and District Council of Laura to form the short-lived District Council of Rocky River.

Long-serving state MP John Lyons was the council chairman for 25 years.

== Chairmen ==
- John Lyons (1924-1946)
- Ernest Smart (1946-1947)
- Marno Ross Reid (1948-1956)
- Eric Hamilton Smith (1956-1963)
- Sydney Leonard Sergeant (1964-1966)
- Colin Fleming Smart (1967-1980)
- Bertram Leonard Smart (1981-1982)
- Keith Prosser Bowman (1982-?)
