= District Council of Spalding =

Former local government area of South Australia

Coordinates: 33°29′0″S 138°36′0″E

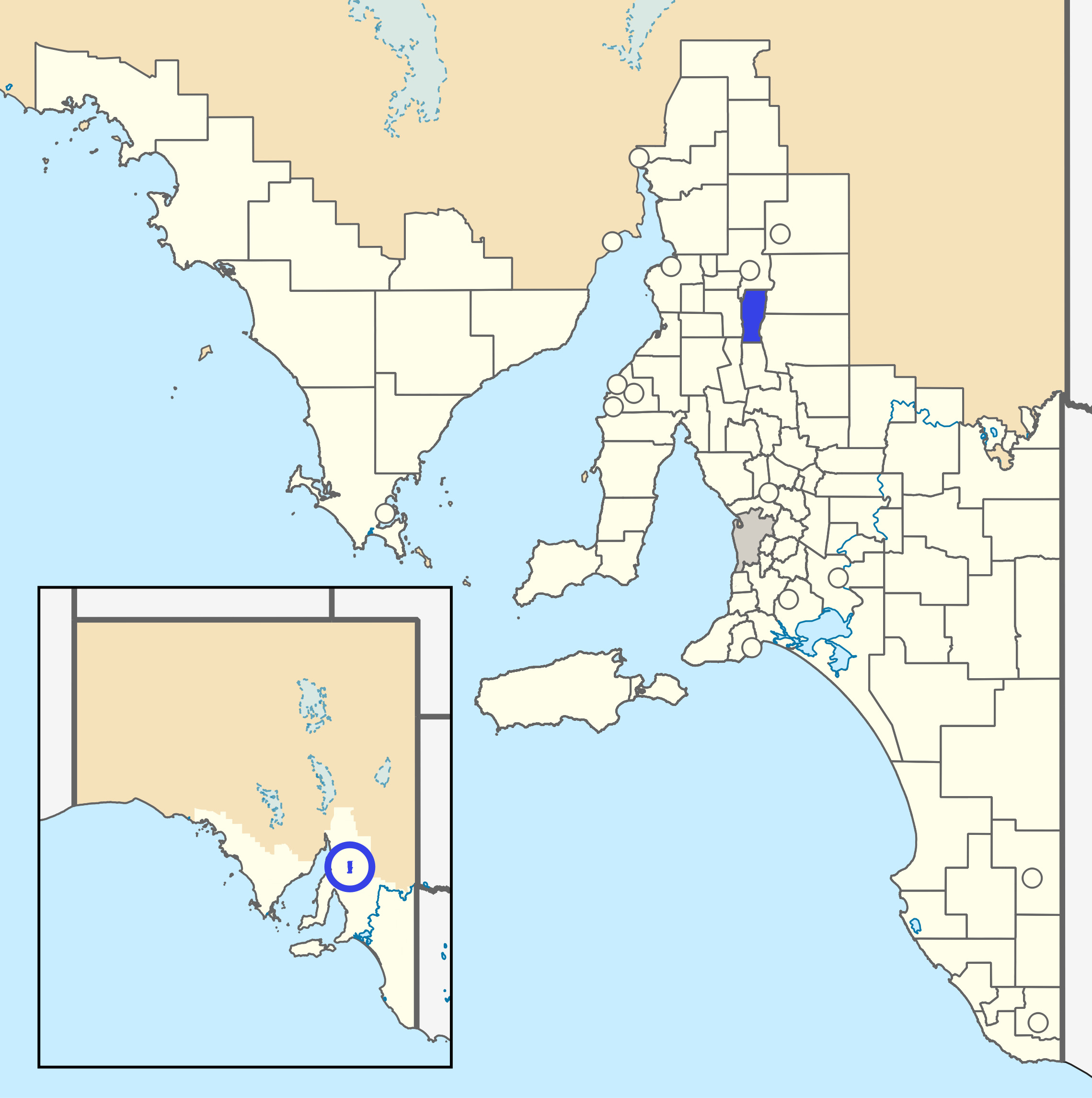
The District Council of Spalding as it was prior to disestablishment (blue)

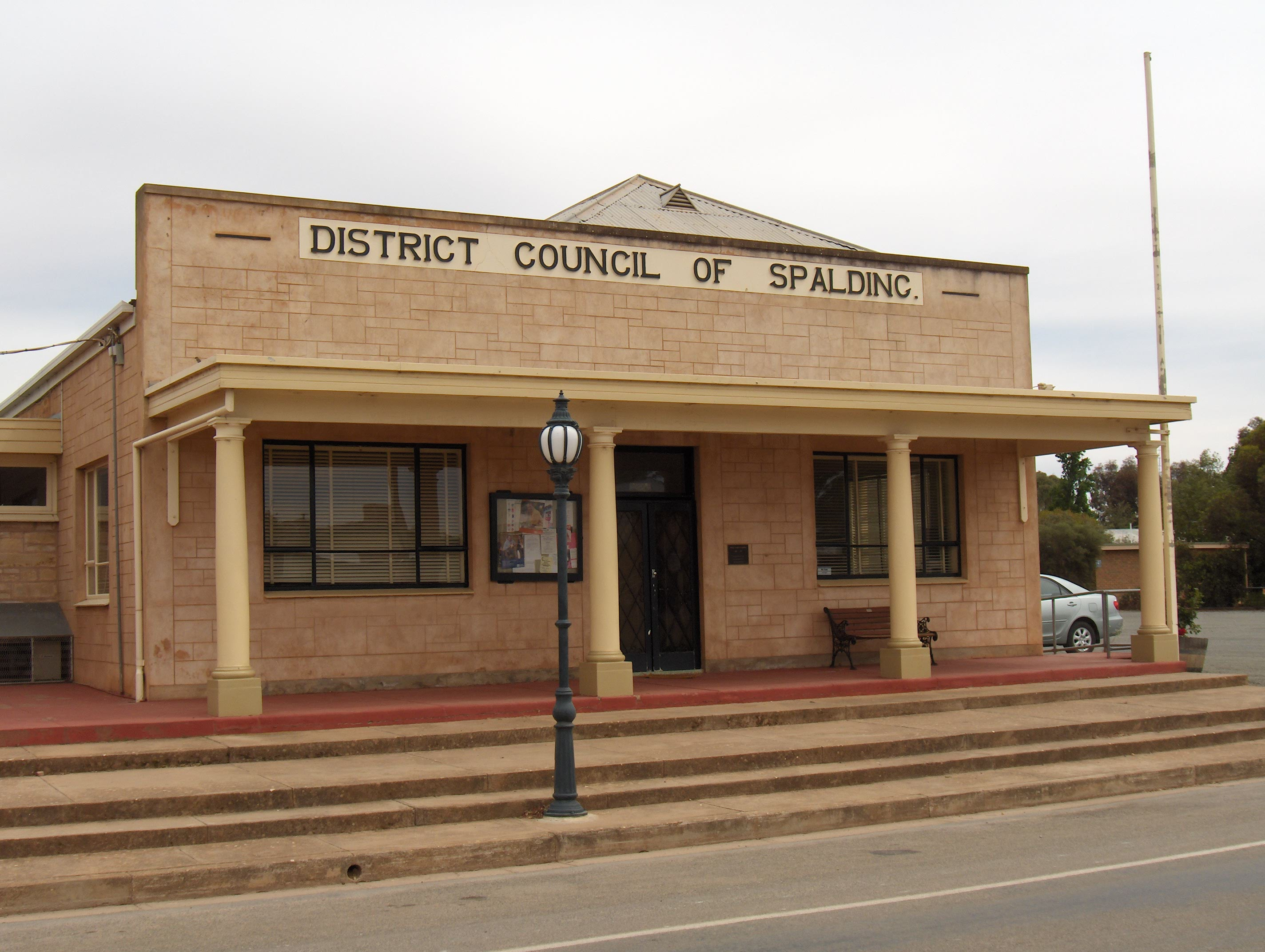
The former council chambers of the District Council of Spalding

The District Council of Spalding was a local government area in South Australia, centred on the town of Spalding. It was proclaimed on 30 July 1885 by Governor William C. F. Robinson, comprising the Hundreds of Reynolds and Andrews as far south as the northern boundary of Euromina. It followed significant agitation by residents for a local municipality, with the boundaries having been the subject of some dispute.

In the 1920s, the council was responsible for constructing and completely financing a bridge across the Broughton River. On 21 March 1935, following the abolition of the District Council of Hutt and Hill Rivers and its division among the surrounding councils, Spalding acquired the remainder of the Hundred of Andrews. In 1936, the municipality was reported to cover 240 square miles, and was described as "one of the most prosperous districts in the state". The council was divided into four wards: Central, North and South (two councillors) and Spalding (one councillor).

The council undertook public film screenings for many years. It operated the former Spalding hospital building as a surgery for visiting doctors, and was involved in the construction of the Soldiers' War Memorial and the Bowling Club. In 1984, it opened a mobile library service to replace the institute library. In 1985, the council published a centennial history: Centenary: The District Council of Spalding 1885-1985, followed by A Pictorial History of Spalding and District in 1991.

In 1986, the council covered a largely rural area of 525 square kilometres, with a population of 550, 250 of them in the township of Spalding itself. The area population had decreased from 1100 in the 1920s and 705 in 1965. The main primary production in the area was grain (chiefly barley and oats) production and sheep The District Council of Spalding existed until 3 May 1997, when it merged with the District Council of Jamestown and District Council of Rocky River to form the Northern Areas Council.

== Chairmen ==
- John Stanley Davies (1925-1926)
- F. Trengove (1929-1930)
- John Stanley Davies (1930-1941)
- Patrick William Donnellan (1941-1946)
- John Stanley Davies (1946-1951)
- Kenneth Samuel Trengove (1951-1956)
- Ernest Allen (1956-1964)
- Kenneth Samuel Trengove (1964-1968)
- Donald Ellis Wilsdon (1968-1974)
