= Wakefield Regional Council =

Coordinates: 34°08′51″S 138°24′56″E

- Local government area
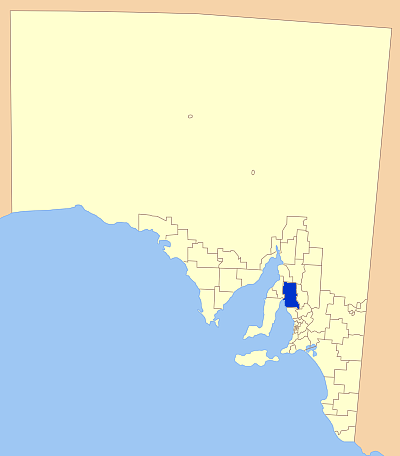
- Location of Wakefield Regional Council

- Interactive map of Wakefield Regional Council
- Country: Australia
- State: South Australia
- Region: Yorke and Mid North
- Established: 1 July 1997
- Council seat: Balaklava

Government
  - Mayor: Rodney Reid
  - State electorate: Frome, Narungga
  - Federal division: Grey

Area
  - Total: 3,469.4 km^{2} (1,339.5 sq mi)

Population
  - Total: 6,780 (LGA 2021)
  - Density: 1.95/km^{2} (5.1/sq mi)
- Website: Wakefield Regional Council
LGAs around Wakefield Regional Council
Barunga West	Port Pirie	Northern Areas
Yorke Peninsula	Wakefield Regional Council	Clare and Gilbert Valleys
Gulf St Vincent	Adelaide Plains	Light

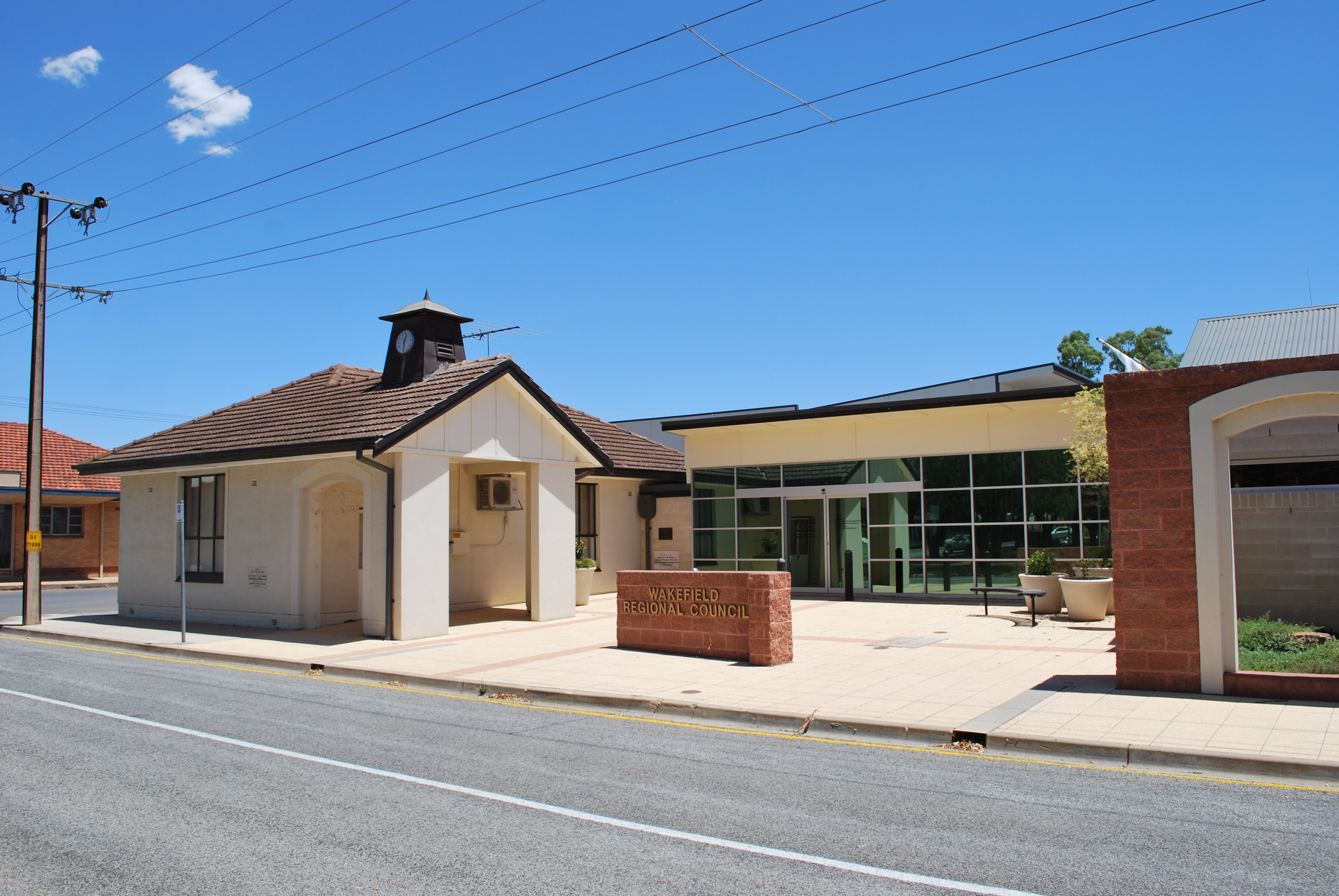
Offices in Balaklava

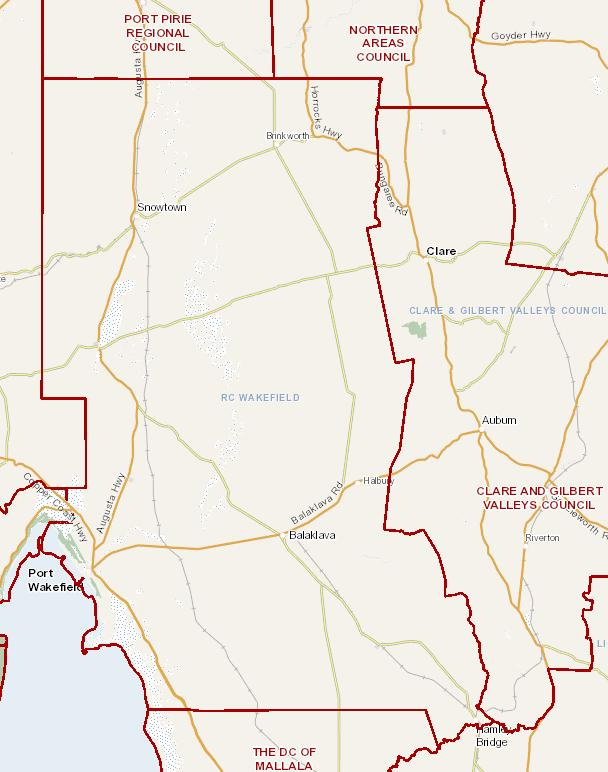
Map of the boundaries of Wakefield Regional Council

Wakefield Regional Council is a local government area in the Yorke and Mid North region of South Australia. The council seat is at Balaklava.

== Geography ==
The Wakefield Regional Council includes the towns and localities of Avon, Balaklava, Barunga Gap, Beaufort, Blyth, Bowillia, Bowmans, Brinkworth, Bumbunga, Burnsfield, Condowie, Dalkey, Erith, Everard Central, Goyder, Hart, Hope Gap, Hoskin Corner, Inkerman, Kallora, Kybunga, Lake View, Lochiel, Marola, Mount Templeton, Nantawarra, Owen, Pinery, Port Wakefield, Proof Range, Rochester, Saints, Snowtown, Stockyard Creek, Stow, Watchman and Whitwarta, and parts of Alma, Barabba, Bute, Grace Plains, Halbury, Hamley Bridge, Hoyleton, Long Plains, Mundoora, Salter Springs, South Hummocks, Wild Horse Plains, and Wokurna.

On the west side of the Wakefield Regional Council's area is the coastal fringe along the north east of Gulf St Vincent and the Hummocks and Barunga ranges. The area spans wide fertile plains to the north Mount Lofty Ranges on its eastern border. Immediately to the east of the Hummocks and Barunga ranges are a series are low-lying salt lakes, of which Lake Bumbunga is the largest. The Wakefield River, from which the council name derives, flows from east to west across the council region approximately a third of the way from south to north border. A portion of the River Light and its confluence with the Gilbert River forms the south eastern border of the council area.

== History ==
The Wakefield Regional Council came into being on 1 July 1997, as a result of the amalgamation of the former District Council of Blyth-Snowtown and the District Council of Wakefield Plains.

The amalgamation occurred when much of the boundary reform of the local government was coming from the State Government as a result of various provisions contained in the "Local Government Act 1934". As a result, the number of local councils in South Australia was reduced from 118 to 68 by the deadline of 30 June 1999.

The area falling under Wakefield Regional Council has been much affected by local government boundary changes that have taken place since the early 1980s. Prior to 1983, five district councils had served the area currently covered by the council since the previous major consolidation of local government bodies in 1935. The district councils in the area prior to 1983 were the District Council of Balaklava, the District Council of Blyth, the District Council of Owen, the District Council of Port Wakefield and the District Council of Snowtown.

The wards of the new Wakefield Regional Council completely erased the old ward boundaries. The entirety of the former Blyth and Snowtown councils as well as small parts of the former Balaklava and Port Wakefield councils became the new North ward. Most of the former Port Wakefield and Balaklava councils became the new Central ward. And the approximate area of the former Owen council became the new South ward.

== Transport ==
The Wakefield Regional Council is well served by a developed transport and communication networks. The main roads, which include the Princes Highway, are all sealed and there are well maintained minor gravel roads. There is no rail service for passengers in the council area, but it is traversed by the Adelaide-Port Augusta railway line.

== Demographics ==
The population of Wakefield Regional Council is 6,756 (2009 estimate).

The council recorded a net decrease in its population of 4.2% between 1991-2001, about 27 people per annum. In 2001, the median age of the population was 39, an increase of 5 years since 1991, indicating a trend towards an ageing population.

The council's geographical area covers 3,469.4 square kilometres (1,339.5 sq mi) in which 2,695 kilometres (1,675 mi) of road existed at 30 June 2002. As at 1 July 2005, the total assessed value within the council area was $1,354,733,680 (capital value).

== Councillors ==
Ward	Councillor	Notes
Mayor	Rodney Reid	
South	Peter Bowyer	
South	Barry Smith	
North	Darryl Ottens	Deputy Mayor
North	Greg Stevens	
North	John Wood	
Central	David Lamond	
Central	Malcolm May	
Central	Richard Pain	
Central	Terry Williams	

The Wakefield Regional Council has a directly-elected mayor.
