= County of Stanley (South Australia) =

Stanley
- Cadastral division
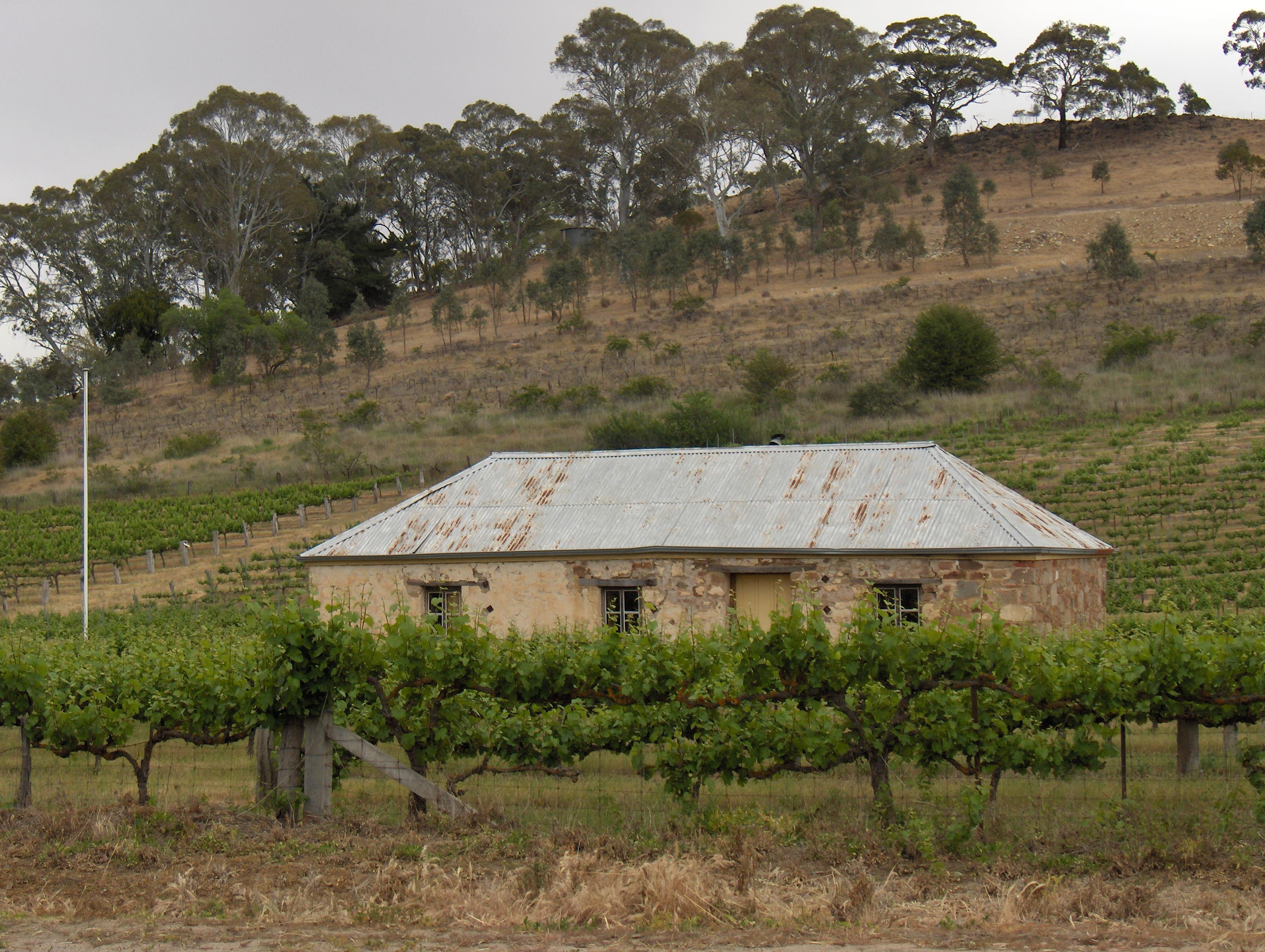
- Cottage among grape vines at Penwortham in the Hundred of Clare

- Coordinates: 33.80°S 138.58°E
- Country: Australia
- State: South Australia
- LGA(s): Wakefield Regional Council; District Council of Clare and Gilbert Valleys; Regional Council of Goyder; Northern Areas Council; Port Pirie Regional Council
- Established: 1842

Area
  - Total: 4,080 km^{2} (1,574 sq mi)
Lands administrative divisions around Stanley
Victoria	Victoria	Kimberley
Daly	Stanley	Burra
Fergusson	Gawler	Light

The County of Stanley is one of the 49 cadastral counties of South Australia. It was proclaimed by Governor George Grey and named for Edward Stanley, Secretary of State for the Colonies from 1841 to 1845, who, in 1842, had advocated financial support for South Australia. It is roughly bounded by the Wakefield River in the south, the approximate path of the Barrier Highway in the east, latitude 33°28' S in the north and longitudes 138°08' to 138°15' E in the west.

== Hundreds ==
The county is divided into 16 hundreds.

- In the county's north west is the Hundred of Koolunga, and, in the north, the Hundred of Yackamoorundie and Hundred of Andrews.
- In the county's north east, on the western slopes of the northern Mount Lofty Ranges are the Hundred of Ayers and Hundred of Hanson.
- In the county's west are the Hundred of Boucaut, Hundred of Hart, Hundred of Everard and Hundred of Blyth.
- In the county's south west, on the lower right bank of the Wakefield River are the Hundred of Goyder, Hundred of Stow and Hundred of Hall.
- In the county's south east, spanning the Clare Valley are the Hundred of Milne, Hundred of Clare, Hundred of Stanley and Hundred of Upper Wakefield.

== See also ==
- Stanley Flat, locality in the Hundred of Clare
- Stanley, locality in the Hundred of Stanley
- Stanley Football Association, historic sporting organisation spanning much of the county
