= District Council of Wakefield Plains =

District Council of Wakefield Plains South Australia
- Coordinates: 34°08′51″S 138°24′56″E
- Established: 1983
- Abolished: 1997
- Council seat: Balaklava
- State electorate(s): Custance; Goyder
LGAs around District Council of Wakefield Plains:
| Bute | Blyth-Snowtown | Saddleworth and Auburn |
| Bute | District Council of Wakefield Plains | Riverton |
| | Mallala | Light |

The District Council of Wakefield Plains was a local government area in South Australia from 1983 to 1997, seated at Balaklava.

== History ==
The District Council of Wakefield Plains was established on 1 July 1983 as a result of the amalgamation of the District Council of Balaklava, the District Council of Owen and the District Council of Port Wakefield. It was divided into seven wards: Balaklava (3 councillors), Hamley (2 councillors), Port Wakefield (2 councillors), and Avon, Goyder, Owen and Stow-Hall (1 councillor each). Margaret Gleeson, the last Balaklava chairman, was elected interim chairman until elections were held, and was succeeded by Reginald Shepherd, the last Port Wakefield chairman, following October elections.

It amalgamated with the former District Council of Blyth-Snowtown to form the Wakefield Regional Council with effect from 1 July 1997.

=== Chairmen and mayors ===
- Margaret Gleeson (1983)
- Reginald Ernest Shepherd (1983–1989)

== Projects ==
Among the projects undertaken by the council were the renovations of the historic Balaklava Town Hall, Old River Light Road Bridge at Hamley Bridge and the old Owen Post Office, the construction of a sports complex at Balaklava, implementation of drainage schemes in Hamley Bridge and Balaklava, and the creation of Jubilee 150 public housing in Owen, Hamley Bridge, Port Wakefield and Balaklava.
