= Hundred of Dublin =

Dublin
- Cadastral division
- Coordinates: 34°27′0″S 138°21′0″E
- Country: Australia
- State: South Australia
- Region: Northern Adelaide Plains
- Established: 22 May 1856

Area
  - Total: 310 km^{2} (119.5 sq mi)
- County: Gawler
Lands administrative divisions around Dublin
Inkerman	Balaklava	Dalkey
Gulf St Vincent	Dublin	Grace
Gulf St Vincent	Port Gawler	Port Gawler

The Hundred of Dublin is a cadastral unit of hundred located on the northern Adelaide Plains of South Australia spanning the township of Dublin and surrounds. It is one of the eight hundreds of the County of Gawler. It was proclaimed in 1856 by Governor Anthony Musgrave and named by Governor Richard Graves MacDonnell after Dublin, Ireland, where he was born.

The following localities and towns of the Adelaide Plains Council area are situated inside (or largely inside) the bounds of the Hundred of Dublin:

- Dublin
- Thompson Beach
- Webb Beach
- Parham
- Windsor
- Calomba
- Wild Horse Plains (southern half)
- Long Plains (southern half)

== See also ==
- District Council of Dublin
- Lands administrative divisions of South Australia
