= Hundred of Balaklava =

Balaklava
- Cadastral division
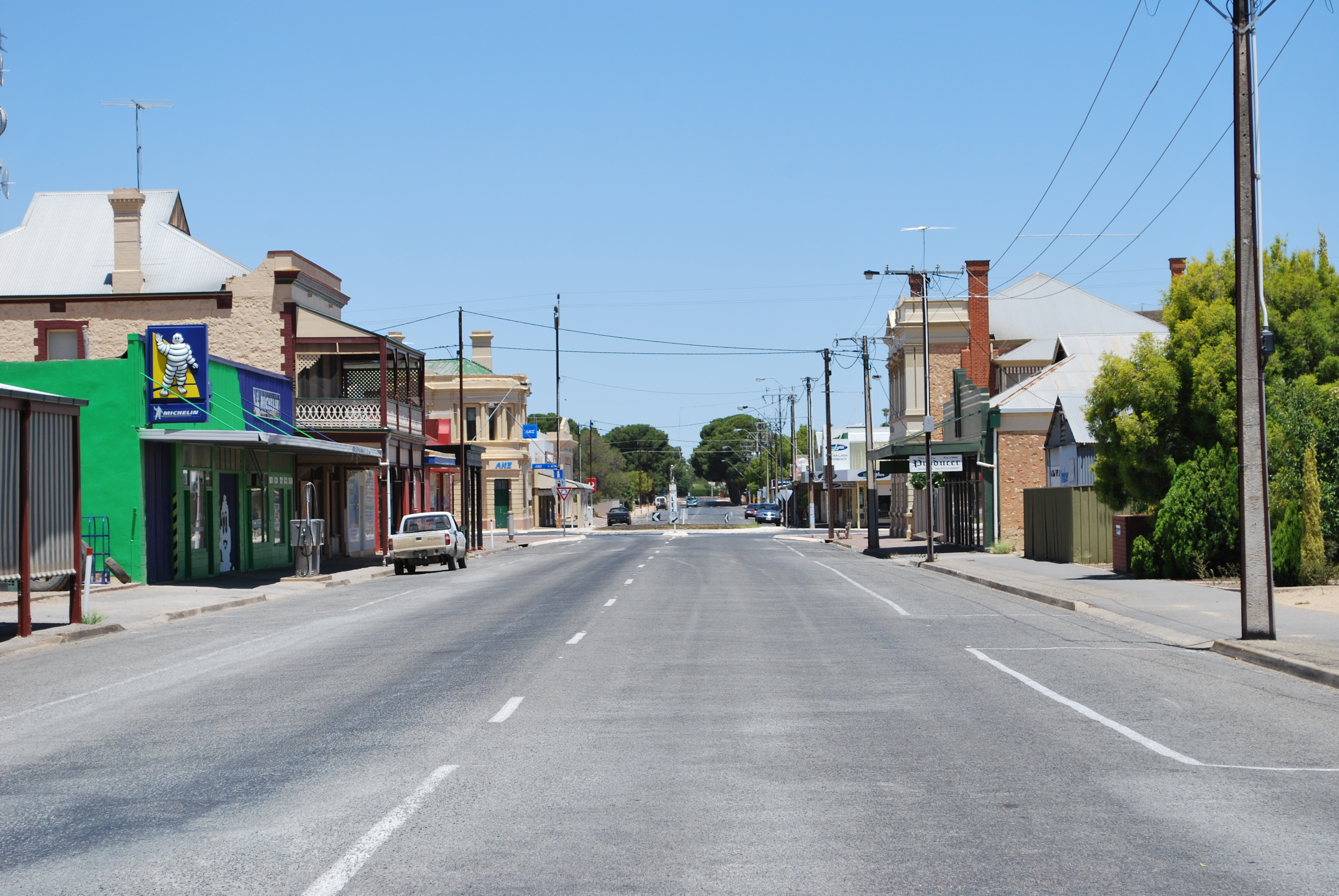
- Balaklava main street at the northeast corner of the hundred

- Coordinates: 34.231°S 138.358°E
- Country: Australia
- State: South Australia
- Region: Mid North
- Established: 22 May 1856

Area
  - Total: 280 km^{2} (110 sq mi)
- County: Gawler
Lands administrative divisions around Balaklava
Goyder	Stow	Hall
Inkerman	Balaklava	Dalkey
Dublin	Dublin	Grace

The Hundred of Balaklava is a cadastral unit of hundred located on the northern Adelaide Plains in South Australia immediately south of the Wakefield River. It is one of the eight hundreds of the County of Gawler. It was named in 1856 by Governor Dominick Daly after the Crimean War Battle of Balaklava. The township of Balaklava is at the extreme north east corner of the hundred.

The following localities of the Wakefield council area are situated inside (or largely inside) the bounds of the Hundred of Balaklava:

- Balaklava (western quadrant south of Wakefield River only)
- Saints
- Erith
- Kallora (eastern half)
- Avon
- Pinery (western half)
- Long Plains (northern half)

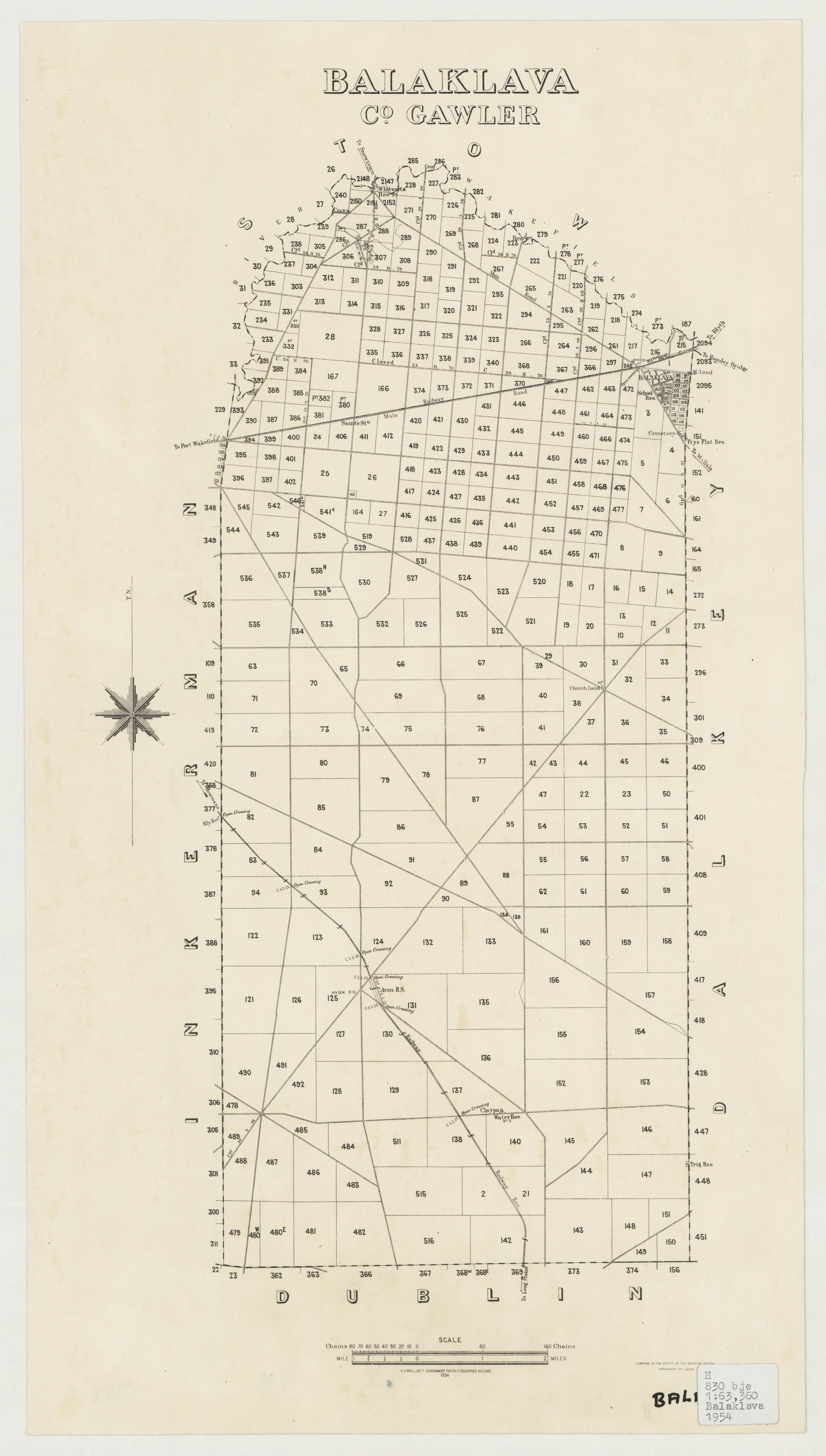
Plan of the Hundred of Balaklava, 1954

== Local government ==
The District Council of Balaklava was established circa 1870, bringing local government to the hundred. In 1983 the Balaklava council amalgamated with the neighbouring District Council of Port Wakefield and District Council of Owen to bring the hundred under the governance of the new District Council of Wakefield Plains. In 1997 Wakefield Plains and the District Council of Blyth-Snowtown were amalgamated bringing the hundred under the governance of the new Wakefield Regional Council.

== See also ==
- Lands administrative divisions of South Australia
