= Hundred of Inkerman =

Inkerman South Australia
- Coordinates: 34.24°S 138.24°E
- Established: 22 May 1856
- Area: 228 km^{2} (88.0 sq mi)
- Region: Mid North
- County: Gawler
Lands administrative divisions around Inkerman:
Kulpara	Goyder	Stow
Clinton	Inkerman	Balaklava
Gulf St Vincent	Dublin	Dublin

The Hundred of Inkerman is a cadastral unit of hundred located on the northern Adelaide Plains in South Australia and bounded on the north by the Wakefield River. It is one of the eight hundreds of the County of Gawler. It was named in 1856 by Governor Richard MacDonnell after the Crimean War Battle of Inkerman.

The following localities and towns of the Wakefield Council area are situated inside (or largely inside) the bounds of the Hundred of Inkerman:

- Wild Horse Plains (northern half)
- Inkerman
- Kallora (western half)
- Proof Range
- Port Wakefield
- Bowmans (southern half)

== Local government ==
On 28 November 1878 the District Council of Port Wakefield was established, incorporating the entire Hundred of Inkerman as well as the western two thirds of the Hundred of Goyder and a small coastal portion of the Hundred of Clinton near the Wakefield port.

In 1983 the Port Wakefield council amalgamated with the councils of Balaklava and Owen bringing the hundred under the local governance of the District Council of Wakefield Plains. Then in 1997 Wakefield Plains and Blyth-Snowtown councils merged bringing the hundred into the much larger Wakefield Regional Council as a part of its Central ward.

== See also ==
- Lands administrative divisions of South Australia
