= Inkerman, South Australia =

Inkerman
- Town
- Coordinates: 34.27696268°S 138.23681511°E
- Country: Australia
- State: South Australia
- Region: Mid North
- LGA: Wakefield Regional Council

Government
  - State electorate: Narungga
  - Federal division: Grey

Population
  - Total: 26 (2016 census)
- Postcode: 5550
- County: Gawler
Localities around Inkerman
Port Wakefield	Port Wakefield; Kallora	Kallora
Proof Range	Inkerman	Avon
Wild Horse Plains	Wild Horse Plains	Long Plains

Inkerman is a locality in South Australia beside Port Wakefield Road between Port Wakefield and Dublin. The town is named for the Hundred of Inkerman, the cadastral unit at the centre of which the town lies. The hundred was named in 1856 by proclamation of Governor Richard MacDonnell after the Crimean War Battle of Inkerman.
