= Pinery, South Australia =

Pinery
- Town
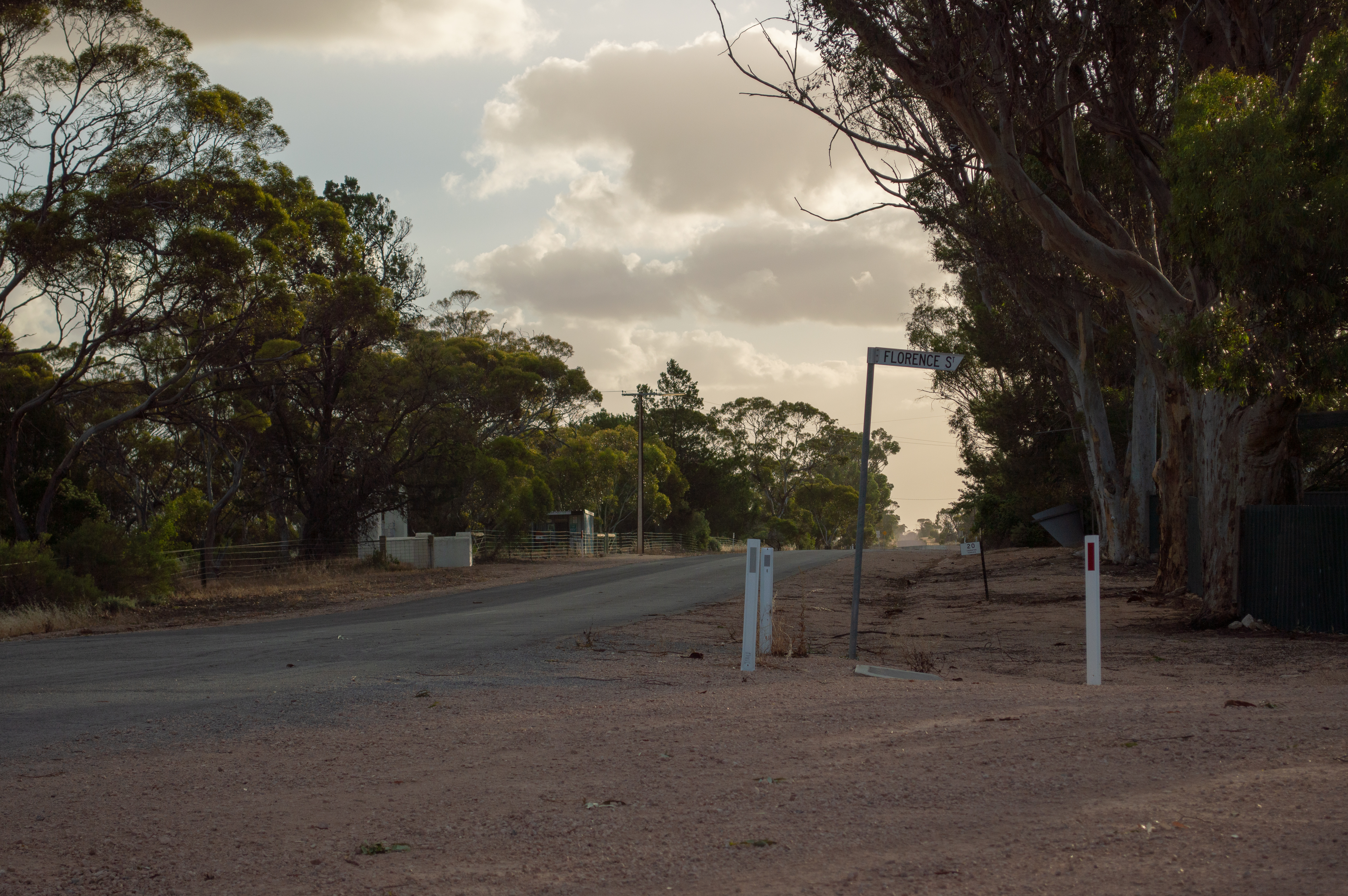
- Corner of Thornton Road and Florence Street

- Coordinates: 34°18′34″S 138°27′26″E
- Country: Australia
- State: South Australia
- LGA: Wakefield Regional Council
- Location: 70 km (43 mi) N of Adelaide

Government
  - State electorate: Narungga
  - Federal division: Grey

Population
  - Total: 87 (SAL 2021)
- Postcode: 5460
Localities around Pinery
Kallora; Port Wakefield	Balaklava; Erith	Owen
Avon; Long Plains	Pinery	Owen
Windsor	Calomba, Mallala	Grace Plains; Hamley Bridge

Pinery is a locality in South Australia's lower Mid North. At the 2006 census, Pinery had a population of 279 but the locality was included with the town of Owen in the 2011 census (population 634) and residents were not counted separately. Both of those were a much larger area than the area which had 102 residents in 2016.

== See also ==
- List of cities and towns in South Australia
- 2015 Pinery bushfire
