= Owen, South Australia =

Owen
- Town
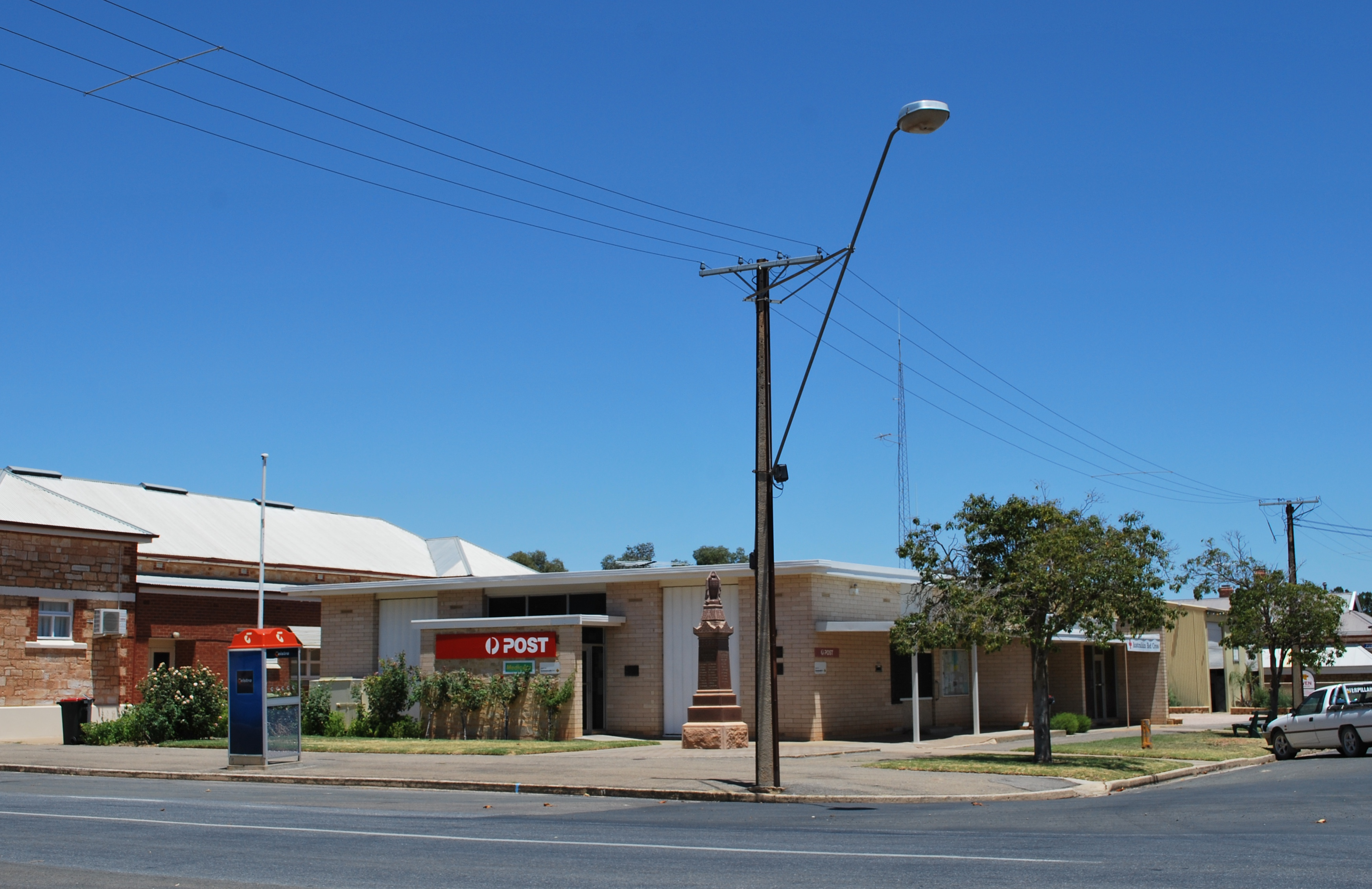
- Post office and war memorial

- Coordinates: 34°16′S 138°32′E
- Country: Australia
- State: South Australia
- LGA: Wakefield Regional Council
- Location: 80 km (50 mi) N of Adelaide; 18 km (11 mi) southeast of Balaklava; 22 km (14 mi) north of Mallala; 18 km (11 mi) northwest of Hamley Bridge

Government
  - State electorate: Goyder
  - Federal division: Grey

Population
  - Totals: 261 (town centre) (2016 census); 511 (district) (2016 census)
- Time zone: UTC+9:30 (ACST)
  - Summer (DST): UTC+10:30 (ACDT)
- Postcode: 5460
- Gazetted: 1 May 1879
Localities around Owen
Hoskin Corner, Balaklava	Halbury	Salter Springs
Pinery, Erith	Owen	Alma
Grace Plains	Barabba	Stockyard Creek

Owen (postcode 5460) is a rural community in the heart of the Adelaide Plains. Owen is 46 metres (150 ft) above sea-level and receives a reliable 416 mm (16.4 in) of rain annually. First settled in about 1865, it is about 80 km (50 mi) north of Adelaide in South Australia and is approximately 40 minutes by road to the nearest main regional centre of Gawler. It is in the Wakefield Regional Council.

== Establishment ==
Owen was gazetted as a town on 1 May 1879 in conjunction with the construction of the Balaklava railway line between Hamley Bridge and Balaklava. There was a second railway siding about 4 kilometres (2.5 mi) northwest of the Government Town of Owen named Woods. The small village by this station is now considered to be part of Owen. At the 2016 census, Owen had a population of 261 in the town and 511 including the surrounding farmland.

The railway station at Stockyard Creek was originally larger than the one at Owen, as Stockyard Creek station was closer to the older town of Alma. However the railway did not go through Alma, and gradually the commercial centre in the area moved from Alma to Owen.

== Overview ==
Owen has a community Church, post office, bowling club, Country Fire Service (CFS) station, primary school, public swimming pool, hotel, children's playground and a golf course. In its heyday in the 1950s, Owen also had a bank, police station, drapery and a butcher.

The countryside surrounding Owen was once largely given over to sheep and cattle grazing. However, since the early 1990s the area has become better known for cropping (wheat, barley, canola, beans and, more recently, olives). The Adelaide-Balaklava broad-gauge railway line passed through Owen and the railway yard is marked by concrete grain silos typical of this region. The town's other main feature is a typical 1940s large concrete water tower of 98 feet (30 m) in height.

The drift to country living and the expanding Adelaide city environs has seen a number of young families moving into the town. New homes are being established at the rate of 1–2 per year – a veritable building boom given the almost 40 years in which only a handful of homes were built in the town. In 1997, the primary school had only 35 pupils. By 2005, this number had risen to over 50, a sure sign of a stable future. Owen's hosts annual small-horse carriage driving championships which are held on the town's oval around Easter time.

== Media ==
Owen's local newspaper is the Plains Producer, founded in 1903 and published in Balaklava.

Owen was also home to the short-lived Owen's Weekly and Dalkey District Courier (3 October – 21 November 1908), which was printed in parallel with the Hamley Bridge Express (3-31 October 1908) by T.W. Broadway. Each was printed in their respective town, and with different mastheads but the same content.

== Gallery ==
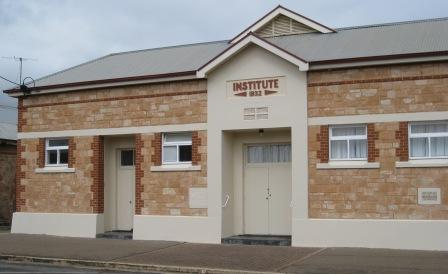
Owen Institute

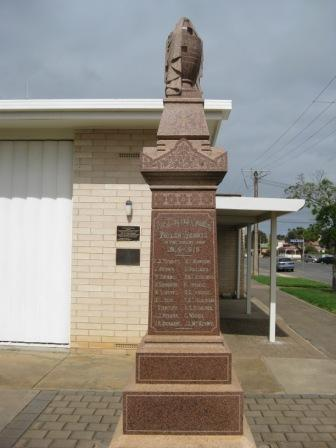
War memorial

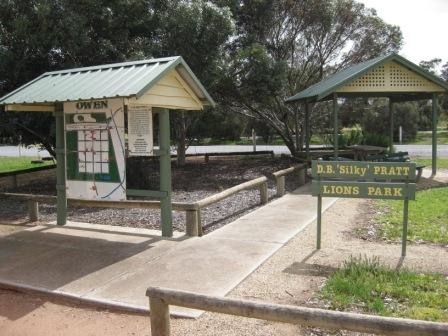
Lions Park

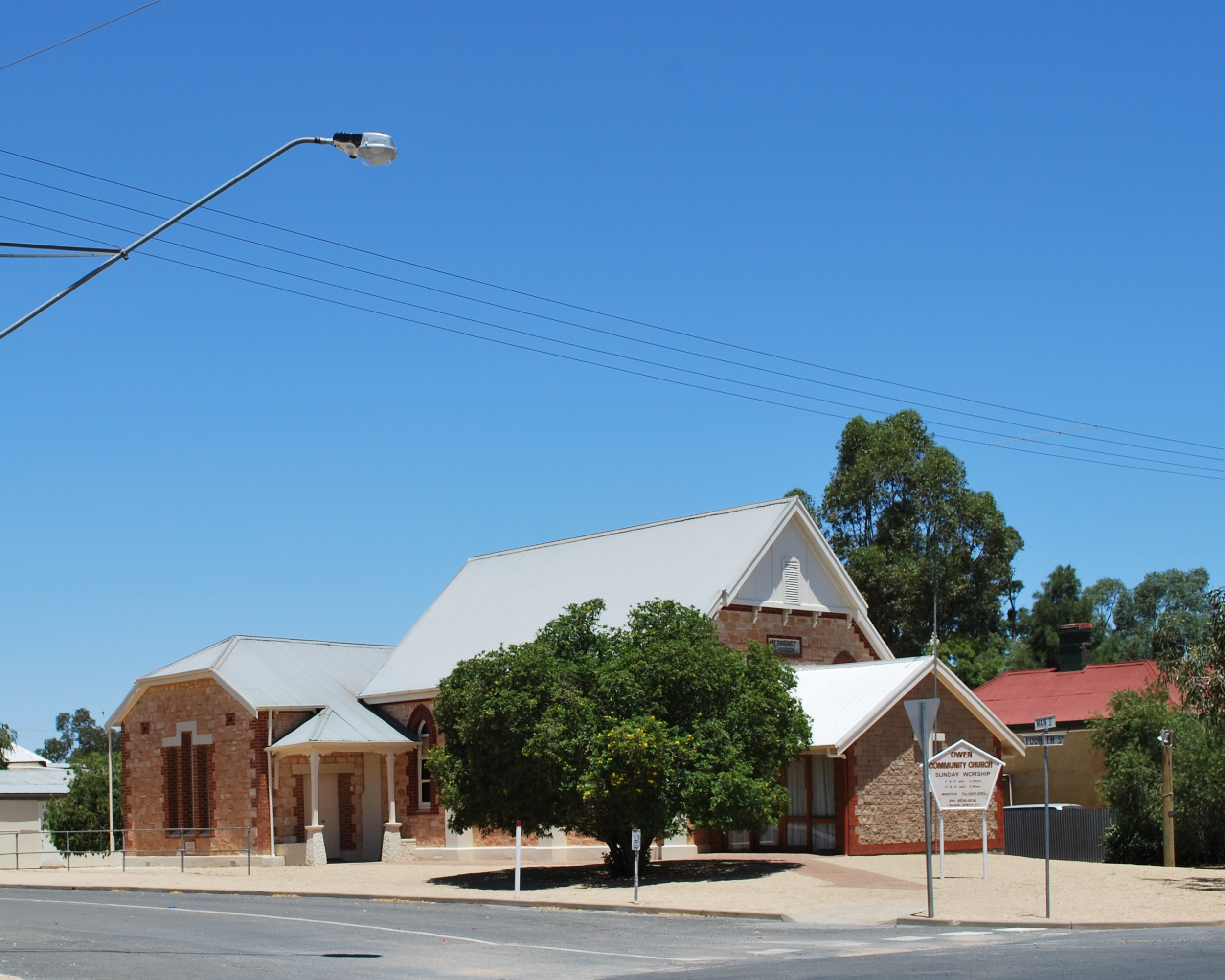
Church

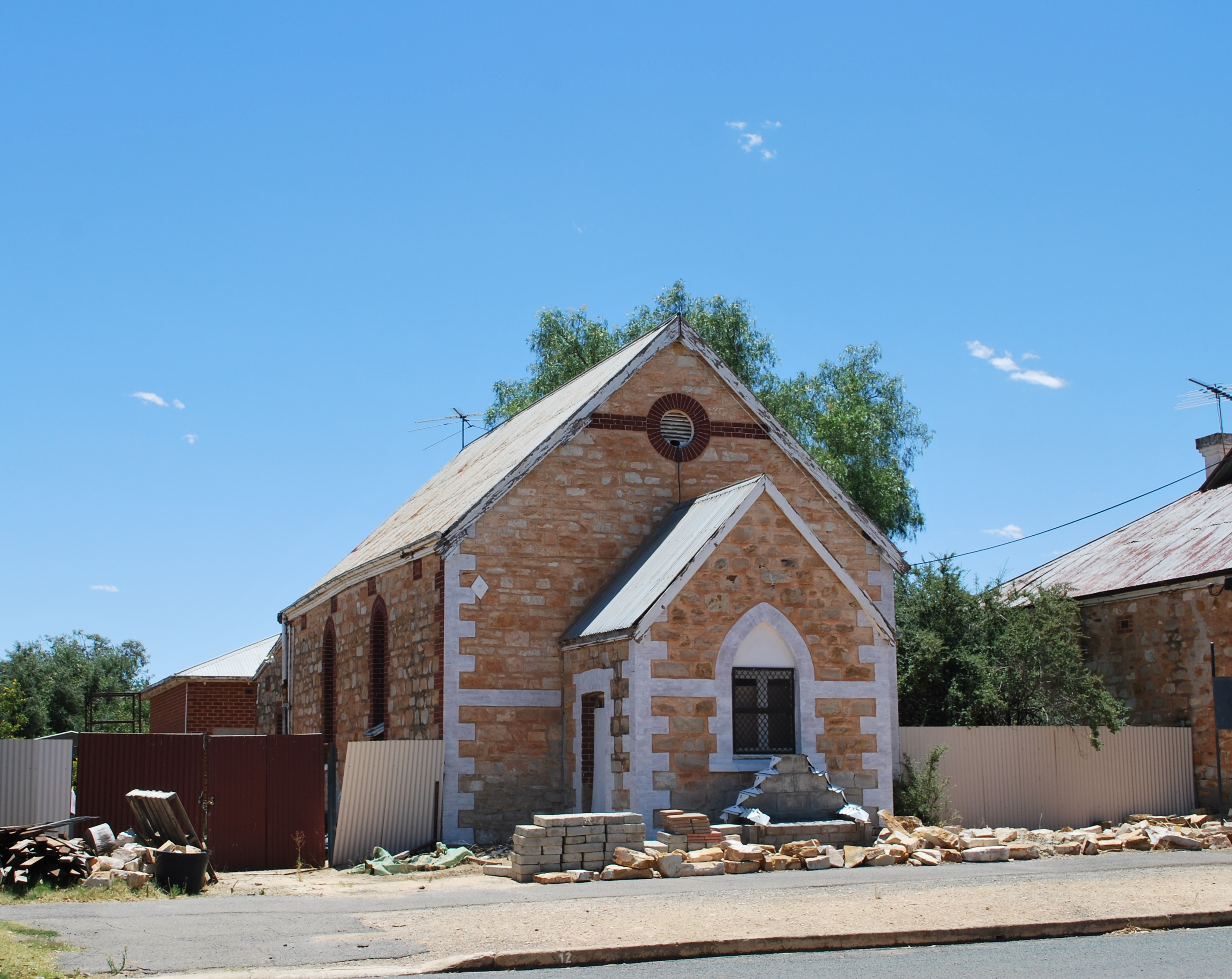
Community Church

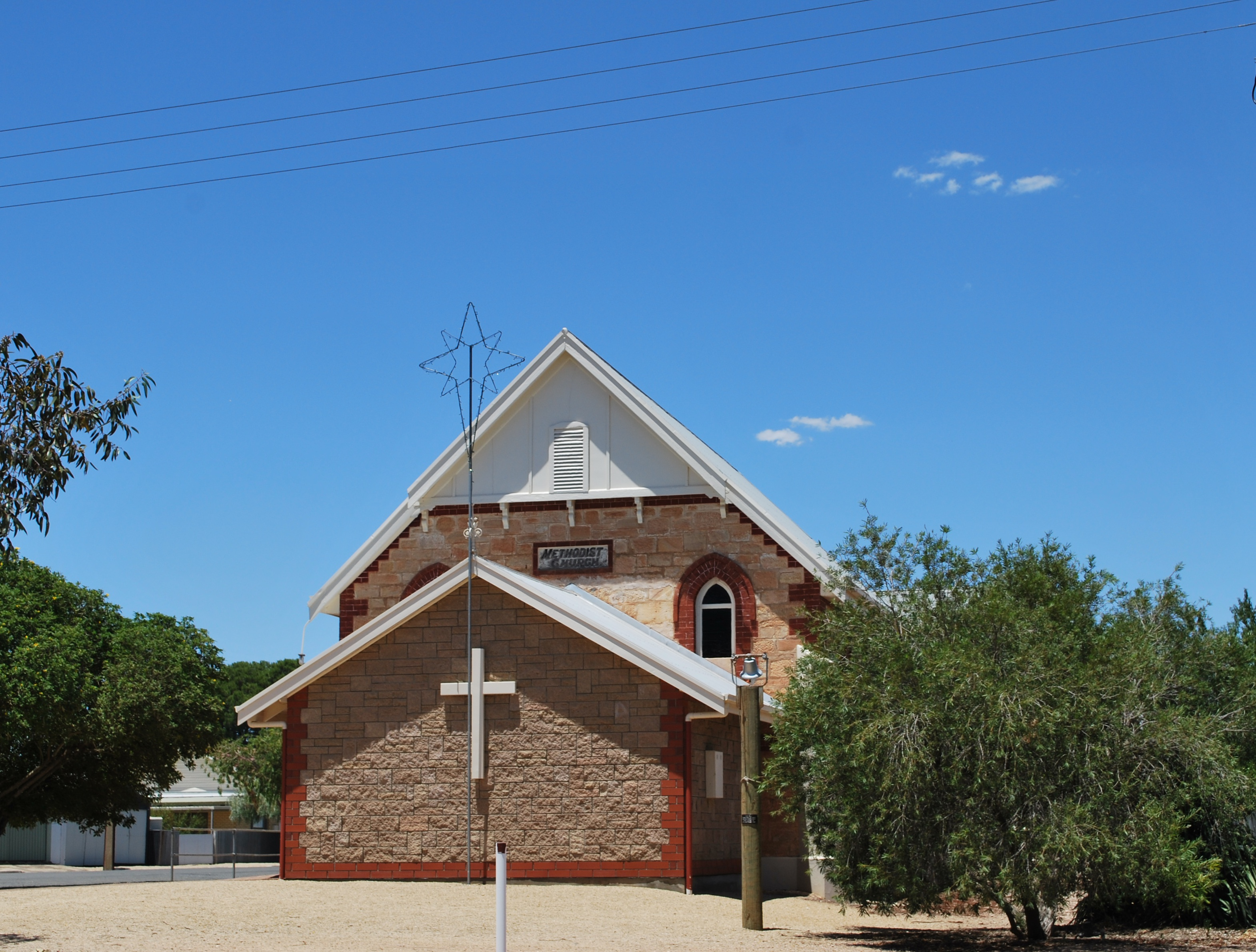
Methodist Church

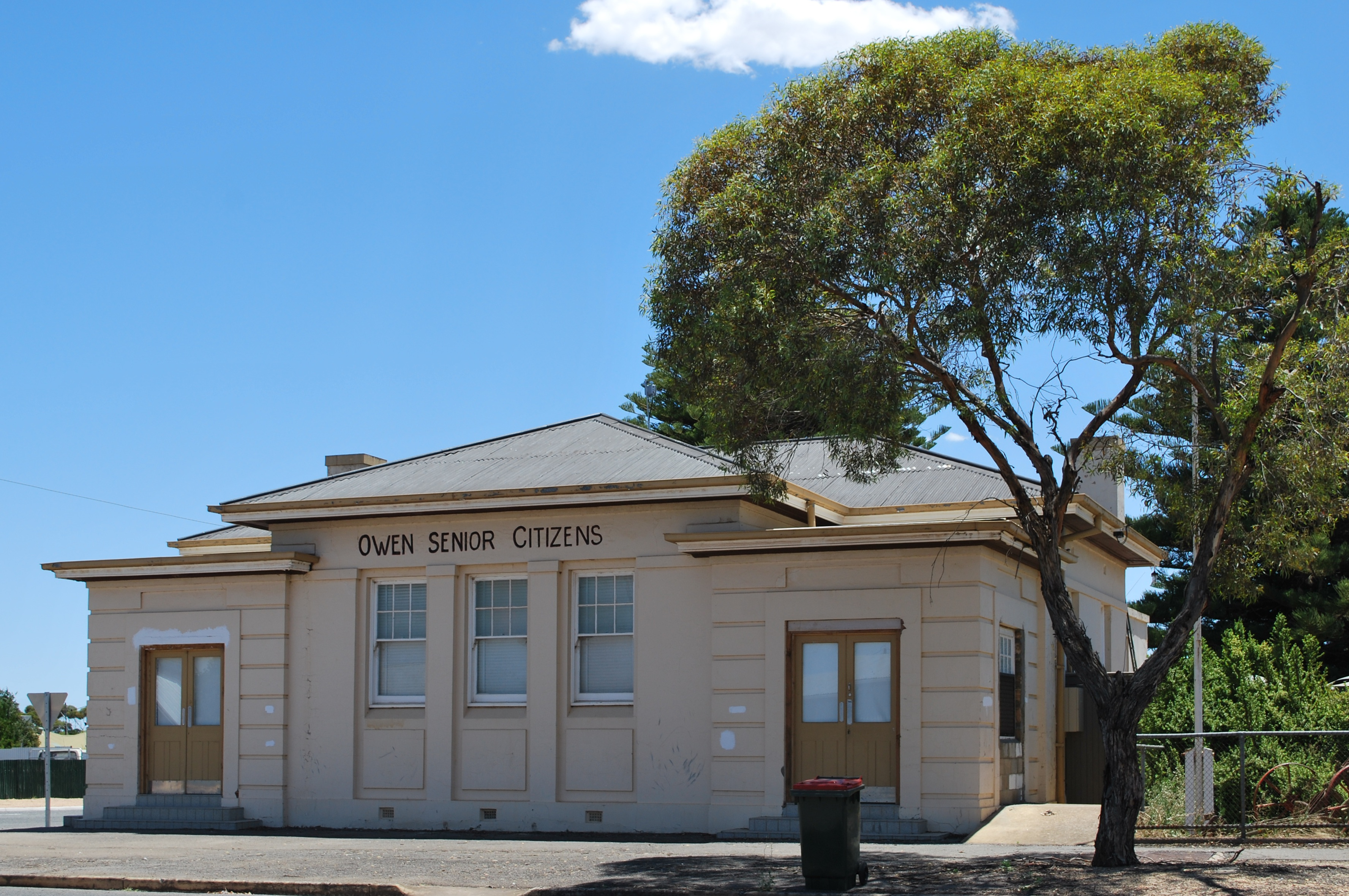
senior citizen Hall

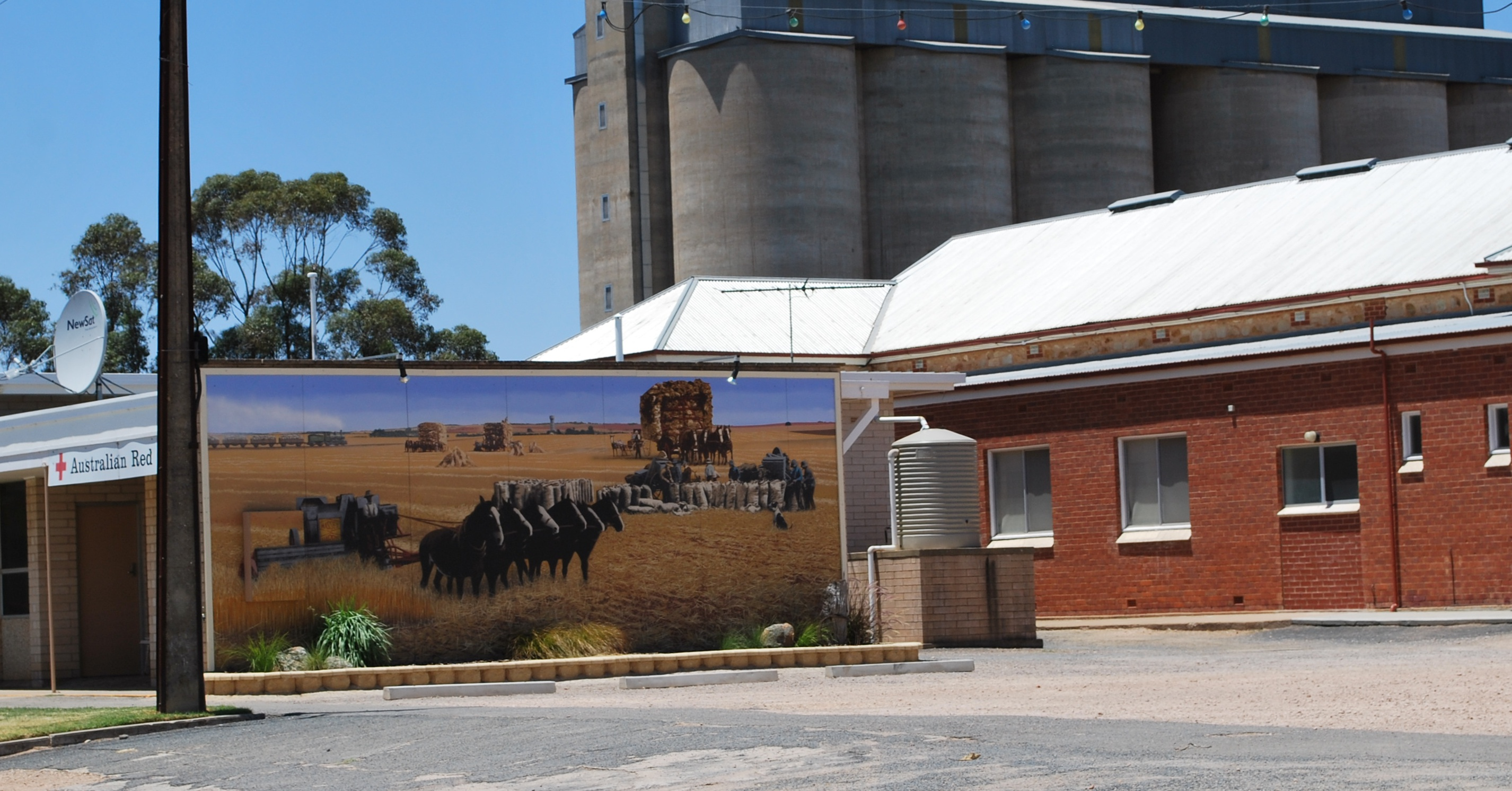
Silos

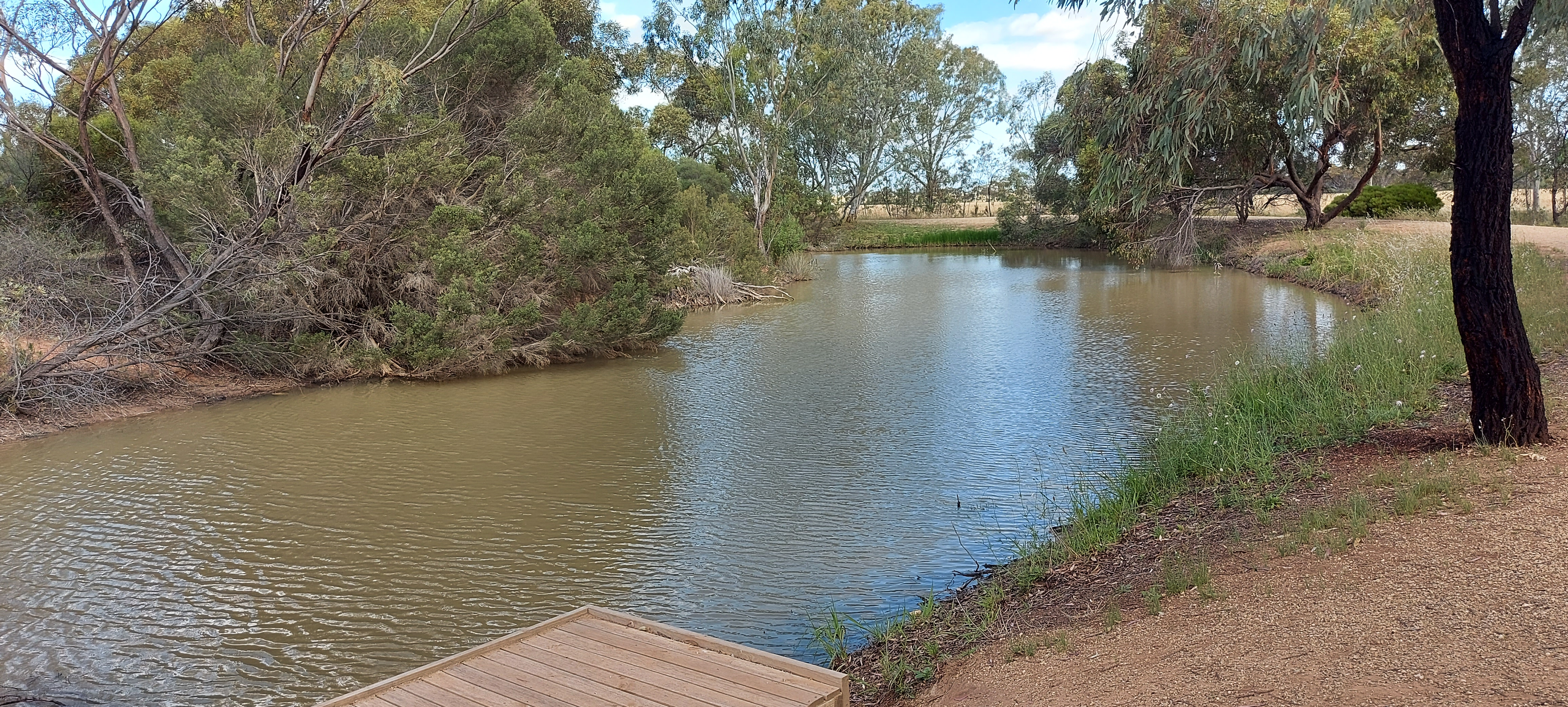
Owen Wetlands

== Notable people ==
- Steele Hall, a former premier of South Australia and then federal politician came from Owen.
- Pru Goward, long-serving Australian Federal Government Commissioner for Sex Discrimination, came from Owen.
