= Grace Plains, South Australia =

Grace Plains
- Town
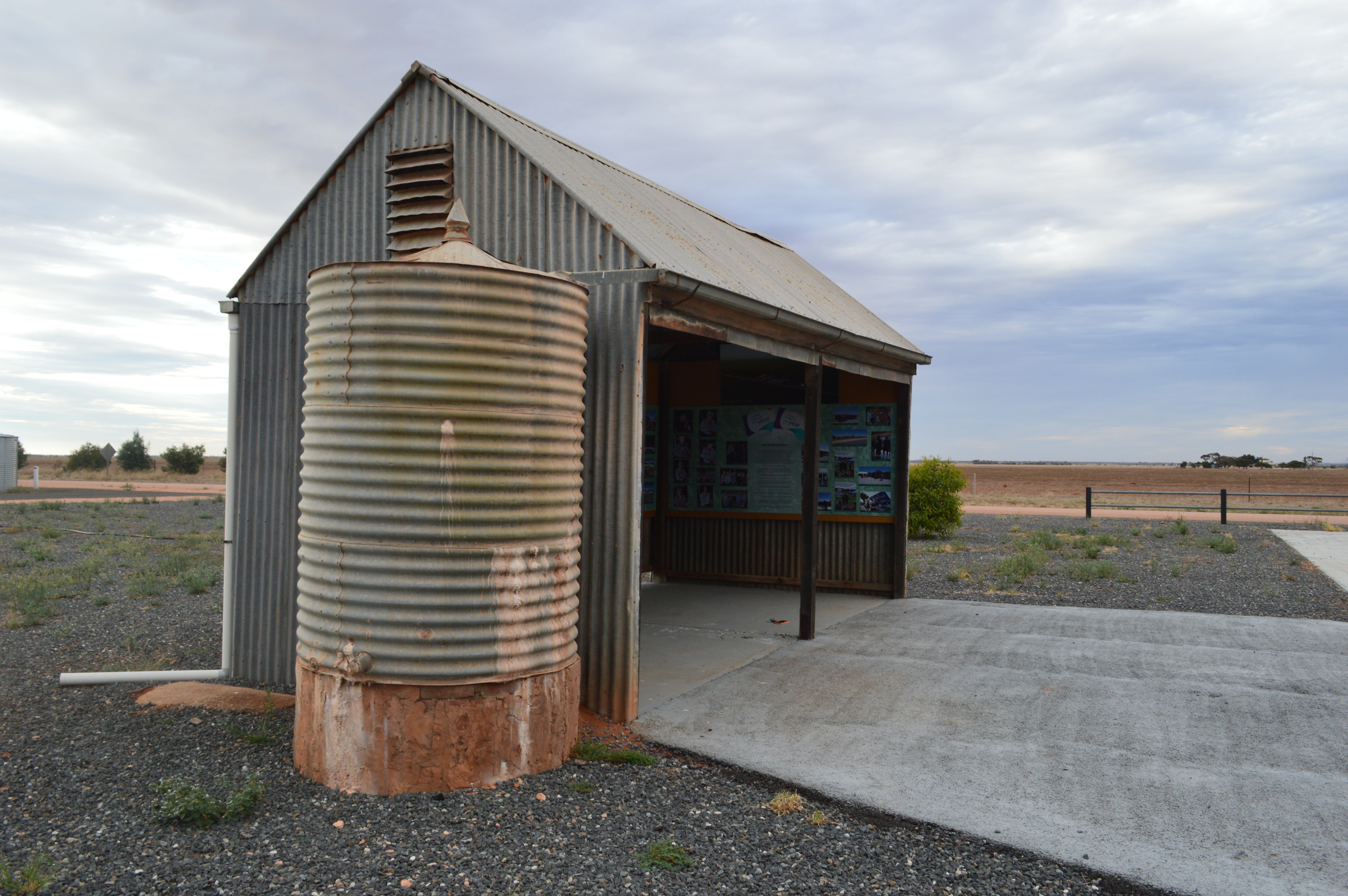
- Pinery Fire Memorial, Grace Plains

- Coordinates: 34.367°S 138.467°E
- Country: Australia
- State: South Australia
- LGA: Adelaide Plains Council Wakefield Regional Council
- Location: 64 km (40 mi) north of Adelaide

Government
  - State electorate: Frome Narungga
  - Federal division: Grey

Population
  - Total: 61 (SAL 2021)
- Time zone: UTC+9:30 (ACST)
  - Summer (DST): UTC+10:30 (ACST)
- Postcode: 5502
- Mean max temp: 23.6 °C (74.5 °F)
- Mean min temp: 9.7 °C (49.5 °F)
- Annual rainfall: 389.0 mm (15.31 in)
Localities around Grace Plains
Pinery	Pinery; Owen	Barabba
Calomba	Grace Plains	Barabba
Calomba	Mallala	Barabba
- Location; Coordinates; Adjoining localities Climate

Grace Plains is a rural locality in South Australia on the northern Adelaide Plains about 64 kilometres (40 mi) north of the state capital of Adelaide. It is divided between the Adelaide Plains Council and the Wakefield Regional Council. The formal boundaries were established in June 1997 for the long established local name with respect of the section in the District Council of Mallala (now Adelaide Plains Council); the portion in the Wakefield council was added in January 2000. It is named after Grace Montgomery Farrell, widow of Rev C. B. Howard, the first South Australian Colonial Chaplain; she later married James Farrell, Dean of Adelaide.

The first school started in 1865 in a building constructed to be both the school and the Primitive Methodist church. Grace Plains School opened in 1894 and closed in 1969. It also had a Methodist (originally Bible Christian) Church, which opened in 1868 and closed in 1971. The church is now a private residence and the former school was destroyed in the 2015 Pinery bushfire. The former recreation reserve 'Moquet Lee' is located behind the church where there is also the Grace Plains cemetery.

Grace Plains Post Office opened in October 1879 and closed on 3 April 1884. It reopened on 22 September 1897 and closed on 30 September 1903.
