= Erith, South Australia =

Erith South Australia
- Coordinates: 34.2173°S 138.401670°E
- Population: 51 (SAL 2021)
- Postcode(s): 5461
- Location: 8 km (5 mi) south of Balaklava; 25 km (16 mi) north of Mallala; 90 km (56 mi) north of Adelaide
- LGA(s): Wakefield Regional Council
- State electorate(s): Goyder
- Federal division(s): Grey
Localities around Erith:
Bowmans	Balaklava	Dalkey
Kallora	Erith	Hoskin Corner
Avon	Pinery	Owen

Erith is a locality on the northern Adelaide Plains in the Mid North of South Australia. It is on the road northwest from Owen towards Bowmans and Port Wakefield.

The Erith primary school opened in 1877 but has since closed sometime after 1949.
