= Windsor, South Australia =

Windsor
- Town
- Coordinates: 34.42°S 138.331°E
- Country: Australia
- State: South Australia
- LGA: Adelaide Plains Council
- Location: 61 km (38 mi) N of Adelaide; 34 km (21 mi) SE of Port Wakefield; 18 km (11 mi) W of Mallala

Government
  - State electorate: Narungga
  - Federal division: Grey

Population
  - Total: 133 (SAL 2021)
- Postcode: 5501
Localities around Windsor
Gulf St Vincent	Wild Horse Plains	Long Plains
Gulf St Vincent	Windsor	Calomba
Parham, Webb Beach	Dublin	Dublin

Windsor is a locality in South Australia. It is on the northern Adelaide Plains adjacent to Port Wakefield Road, 34 km southeast of Port Wakefield. The township is largely bypassed by Port Wakefield Road.

The township was a private subdivision by George Baker c.1876. By 1876 there was a store and by 1878 there was a school and Primitive Methodist Church, now Uniting Church. The Uniting Church held its last service in the building on 25 October 2020.

In 1884 the Windsor Institute was built, and has served the community as a hall and library for over 130 years. The town had an oval with concrete cricket pitch opposite the school and tennis courts, on Windsor Road. The oval, established by 1883 and used by the Windsor Cricket Club, was also used until the 1960s by the school. The football club joined with Wild Horse Plains to for United in 1921. The school and local football team colours were double blue. The tennis club commenced in 1880s.

A post office (1877-1982) and store (1877-1985) operated from 1877 closing after the township was bypassed by Port Wakefield Road. The Windsor School closed in 1971.

The district was part of sheep grazing leases from mid nineteenth century. George Baker took up the land in the area in 1860. After the district was surveyed and sold, settlers established mixed farms. This continued until the 1970s with mixed farming, growing grain, lambs, pigs, eggs, poultry and cream. In early days grain was taken to Parham for dispatch to Adelaide. There was a "Windsor Separator" brand of butter. The press is retained by Clark family members.

== See also ==
- Adelaide International Bird Sanctuary National Park—Winaityinaityi Pangkara
