= Balaklava, South Australia =

Balaklava
- Town
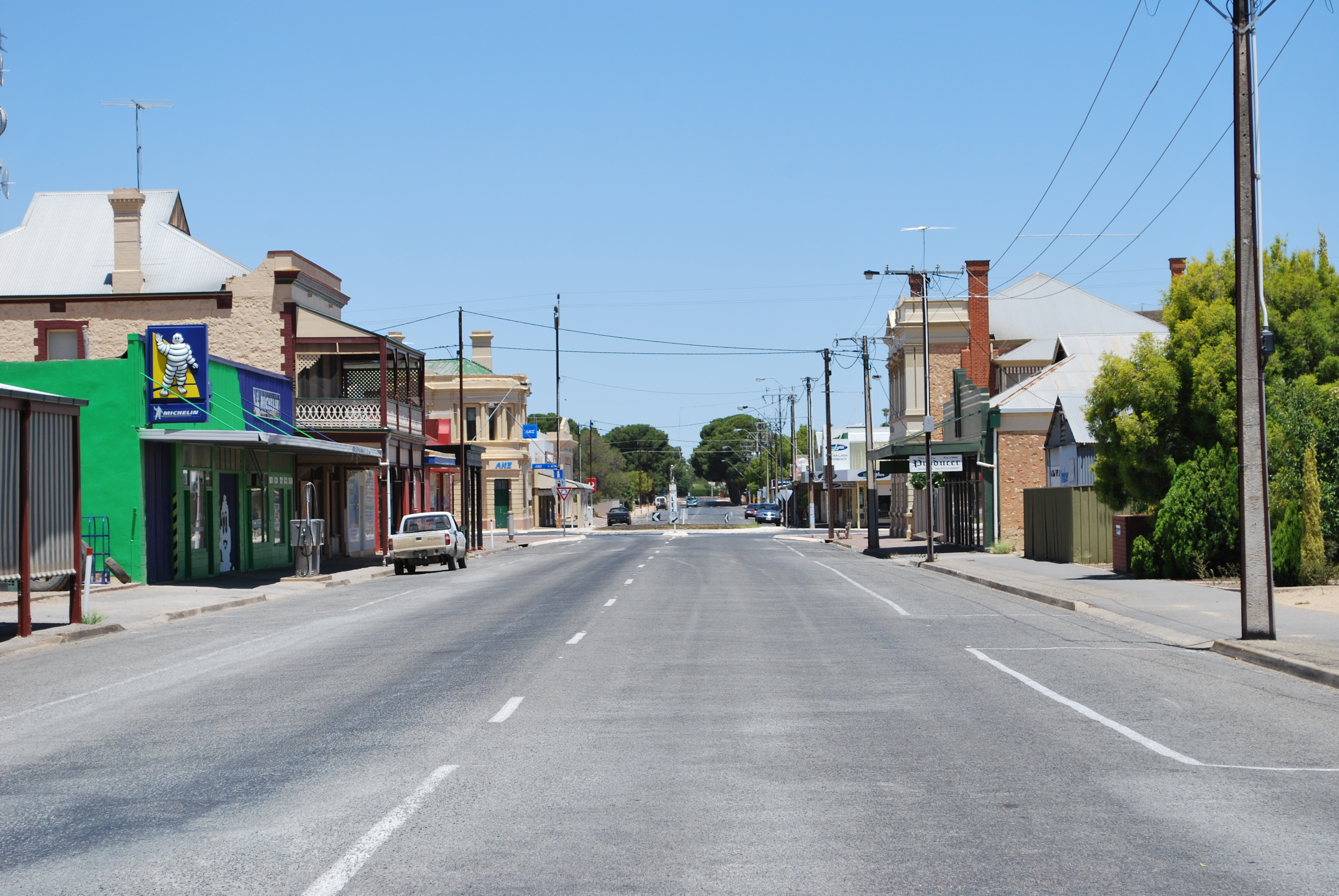
- Shops in the main street of Balaklava

- Coordinates: 34°08′56″S 138°24′52″E
- Country: Australia
- State: South Australia
- Region: Mid North
- LGA: Wakefield Regional Council
- Location: 92 km (57 mi) north of Adelaide; 35 km (22 mi) west of Auburn
- Established

Government
  - State electorate: Narungga
  - Federal division: Grey
- Elevation (railway station): 68 m (223 ft)

Population
  - Total: 1,956 (UCL 2021)
- Time zone: UTC+9:30 (ACST)
  - Summer (DST): UTC+10:30 (ACST)
- Postcode: 5461
Localities around Balaklava
Whitwarta	Watchman	Halbury
Whitwarta; Saints; Kallora	Balaklava	Halbury; Owen
Kallora	Erith; Dalkey; Hoskin Corner	Owen

The town of Balaklava (population 2048, postcode 5461) is located in South Australia, 92 kilometres north of Adelaide in the Mid North region. It is on the south bank of the Wakefield River, 25 kilometres (16 miles) east of Port Wakefield.

== History ==
Since prehistoric times the Balaklava district has been near the boundaries of the Kaurna and Peramangk peoples. The first Europeans to traverse the district were John Hill and Thomas Burr on 29 April 1840. They discovered Diamond Lake and encamped near Owen. The first European settlers in the area were James and Mary Dunn who in 1850 opened a hotel to service bullock teamsters carting copper ore upon the Gulf Road between the Burra mine and the export port of Port Wakefield.

The Gulf Road copper ore traffic came to a sudden end in 1857 when a railway connected Gawler to Port Adelaide which provided a more economic path for exporting the ore. The teamster's loads were replaced by a flow of pastoral produce to Port Wakefield, mainly wool and grain. The town was laid out by Charles Fisher in 1869 and named it after the Hundred of Balaklava which in turn was named for the Battle of Balaklava. He built large grain stores on the tramway from Hoyleton to the port at Port Wakefield, intending to encourage farmers to settle near the town. The first Hotel erected in the new township of Balaklava was the Balaklava Hotel, later called the Royal. Thomas Saint borrowed the finances from Thomas James Manton and applied for the Hotel Keepers Licence on 17 November 1870 and was granted licence No.17 of 1871 on 4 April 1871.

Balaklava was first on the 1,067 mm (3 ft 6 in) narrow gauge Port Wakefield railway line which was an isolated horse-drawn tramway inland through Balaklava to Hoyleton. This was eventually taken over by South Australian Railways and converted to steam, as well as being extended at both ends. Balaklava was later considered to be on the Gladstone railway line, with a junction to Port Wakefield. The line to Balaklava from Hamley Bridge (connecting to Adelaide) opened in 1878. It was converted to 1,600 mm (5 ft 3 in) broad gauge in 1927. The Port Wakefield railway line was closed and removed. The last freight on the line was bulk grain in 2004.

As the Balaklava railway station was originally on the Port Wakefield to Hoyleton line, before the railway from Hamley Bridge was built, and that line entered the town from the southeast, trains travelling using the route between Gladstone and Adelaide needed to change direction at Balaklava, as both the north and south lines entered the station from the east, with Port Wakefield being to the west.

The name of the town was originally spelled Balaclava.

Balaklava is home to long time nuclear veteran campaigner Avon Hudson.

Steele Hall, premier of South Australia in 1968–70 and later a federal politician, was born in Balaklava and attended Balaklava High School.

== Geography ==
Neighbouring townships to Balaklava include:

- Auburn
- Blyth
- Clare
- Halbury
- Mallala
- Owen
- Port Wakefield
- Snowtown
- Hamley Bridge

== Governance ==
Balaklava is the administrative centre for local government seat of Wakefield Regional Council and is located in the state electoral district of Frome and the federal electoral division of Grey.

== Education ==
The township of Balaklava has four education institutions:

- Balaklava Community Children's Centre
- Balaklava Primary School
- Balaklava High School
- Balaklava Horizon Christian School

== Media ==
The local newspaper is the Plains Producer, which has been published in the region since 25 September 1903. Throughout its life, it evolved through a series of name changes:

- originally known as Central Advocate
- renamed on 10 September 1909 to Wooroora Producer (subtitled: "incorporating the Central Advocate and The Hamley Bridge Express")
- renamed on 4 July 1940 to The Producer (subtitled: "with which is incorporated "The Central Advocate" and "Hamley Bridge Express"")
- publication ceased for five years, from 19 June 1941, and resumed as a "Post-War Series" on 4 July 1946
- renamed to Plains Producer in 1983

Another publication, Two Wells and Districts Echo, is also printed in the town. The main office for Papers & Publications, which produces both publications, is on Howe Street.

== Art and sports ==
Balaklava Racing Club founded in 1903, boasts the longest straight in SA, holding 13 race meets throughout the year with the highlight being the Balaklava Cup

The Balaklava Cup horse racing carnival is on the first Wednesday each September.

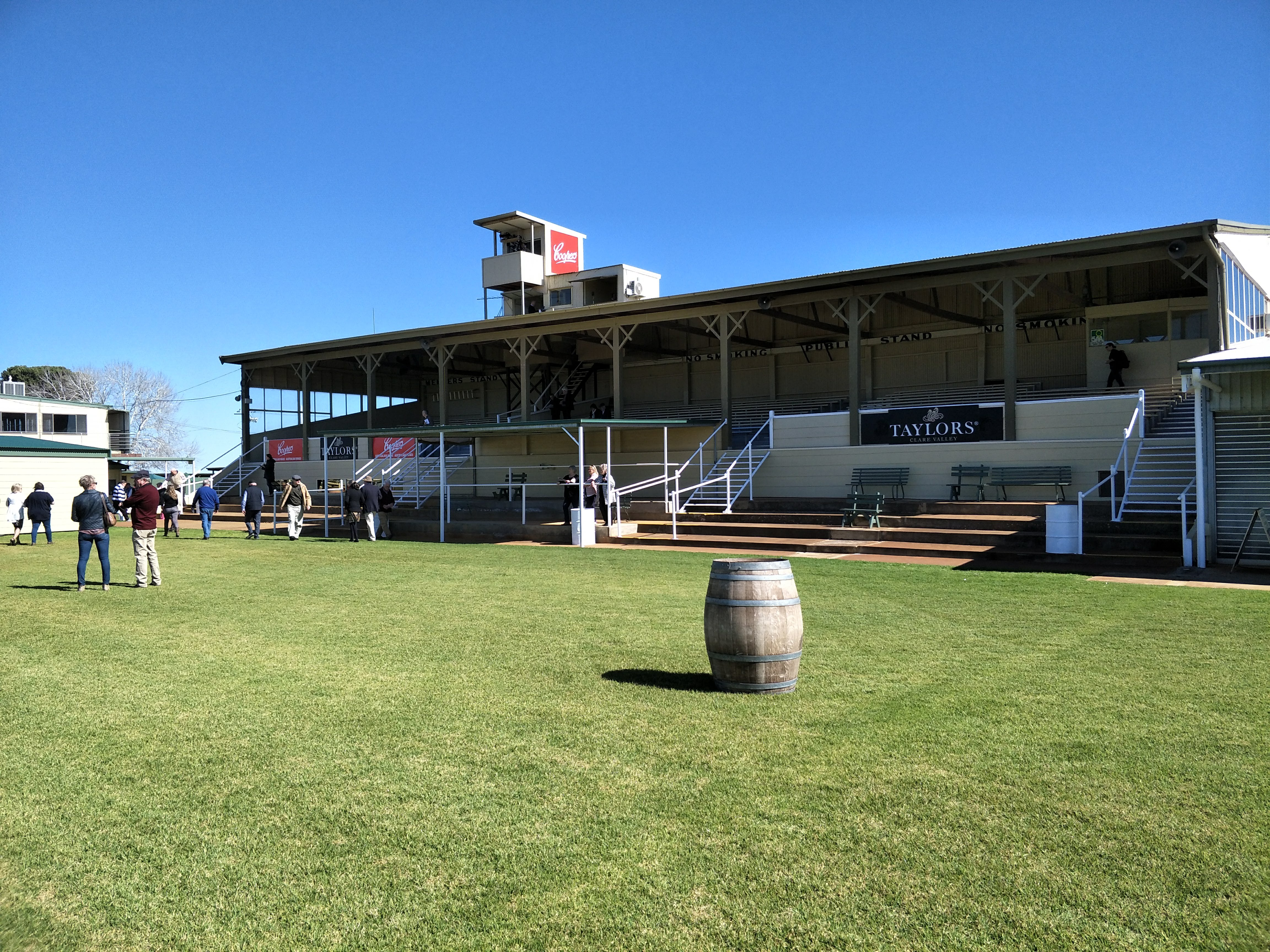
Balaklava Racecourse Heritage Grandstand Today

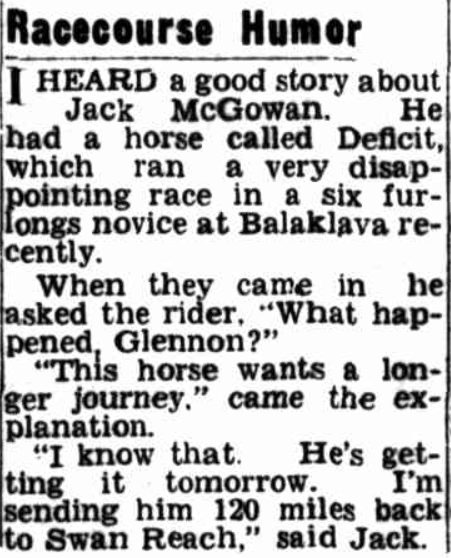
Jacks Humor at the Balaklava Races. Story about Racing Legend Jack McGowan at the Balaklava Races, published in the Adelaide Chronicle in 1952. (See Brooklyn Park for information about Jack).

It also has an agricultural show in September each year. This major event showcases the regions many achievements, in agriculture, horse riding, baking, art and the local schools achievements as well as many fun things for the family to enjoy.

Balaklava is well known throughout the South Australian music, drama and school communities for its interest and support in the performing arts. The Balaklava Eisteddfod Society holds its own music and speech/drama Eisteddfod every year in late July/early August. It has been running since 1997 and is a major event for the township.

The Balaklava Community Arts group has been running since 1982 and has always been very supportive of the visual and performing arts. The Balaklava Courthouse Gallery began within the ranks of Balaklava Community Arts and now holds widely known exhibitions and competitions in visual arts. The Balaklava Community Arts group continues to nurture the local artistic talents and entertain the community with performing arts by both local and visiting artists, promoting the arts to the wider community.

Balaklava has several sporting facilities and clubs with regular competitions, such as the local basketball and tennis in summer, local football and netball in winter, and the squash courts which open all year. The football oval and basketball, netball and tennis courts are centralised at one location. Balaklava has its own pool, open from November through to April each year.

The Balaklava Golf Club is an 18-hole 5,987-metre (19,642 ft) championship golf course fully watered year round and has clubhouse facilities. The Balaklava Gliding Club is located at Whitwarta, 10 kilometres (6.2 mi) north-west of the township. Flying operations are normally on every weekend or by prior arrangement.

== Gallery ==
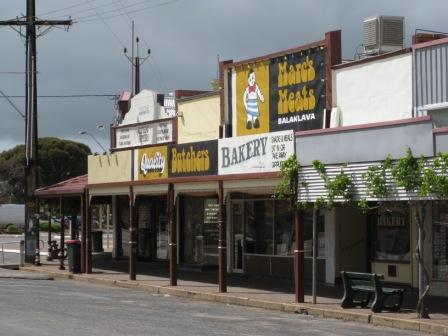
Shops in the main square

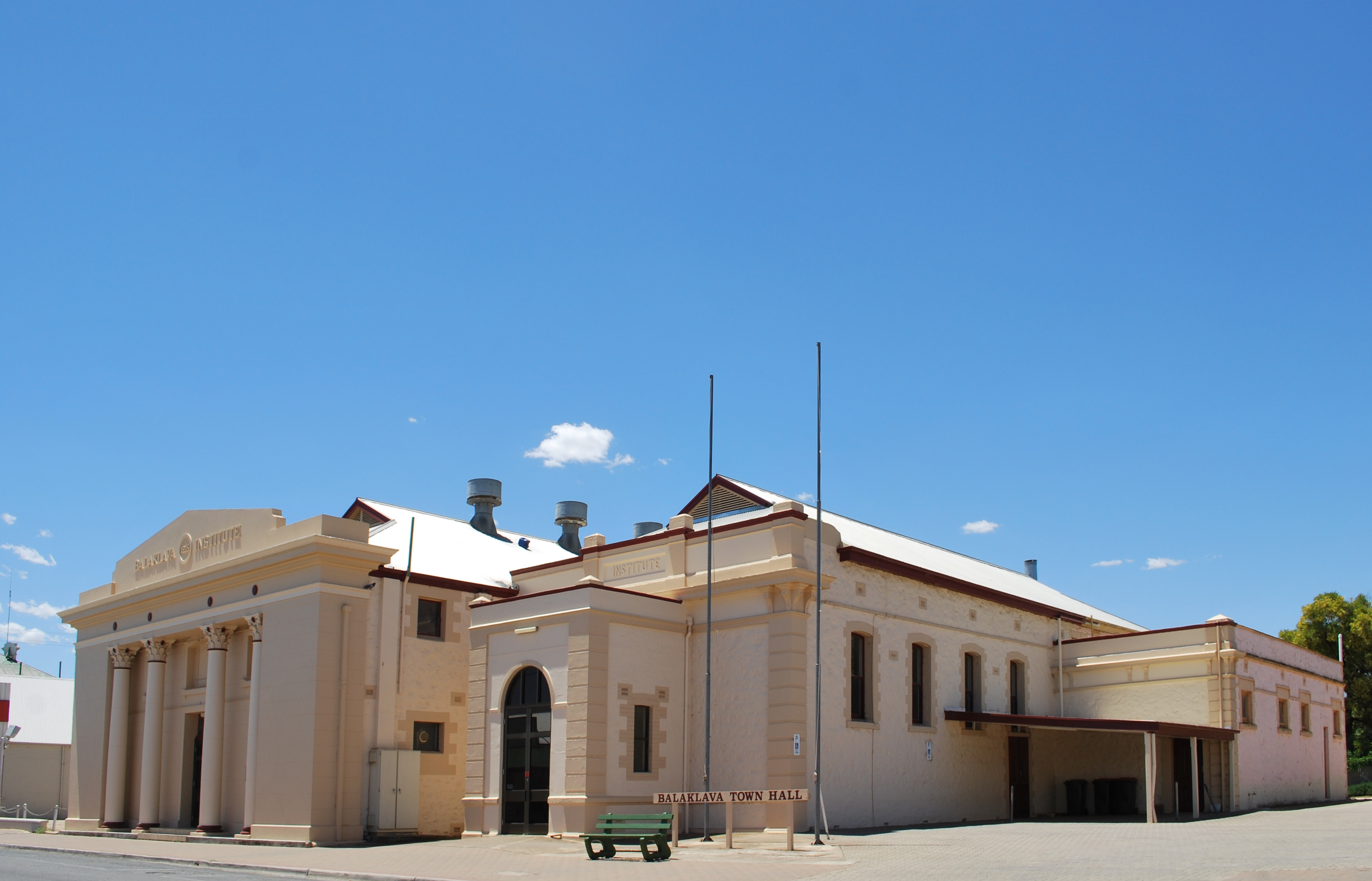
Town hall and institute

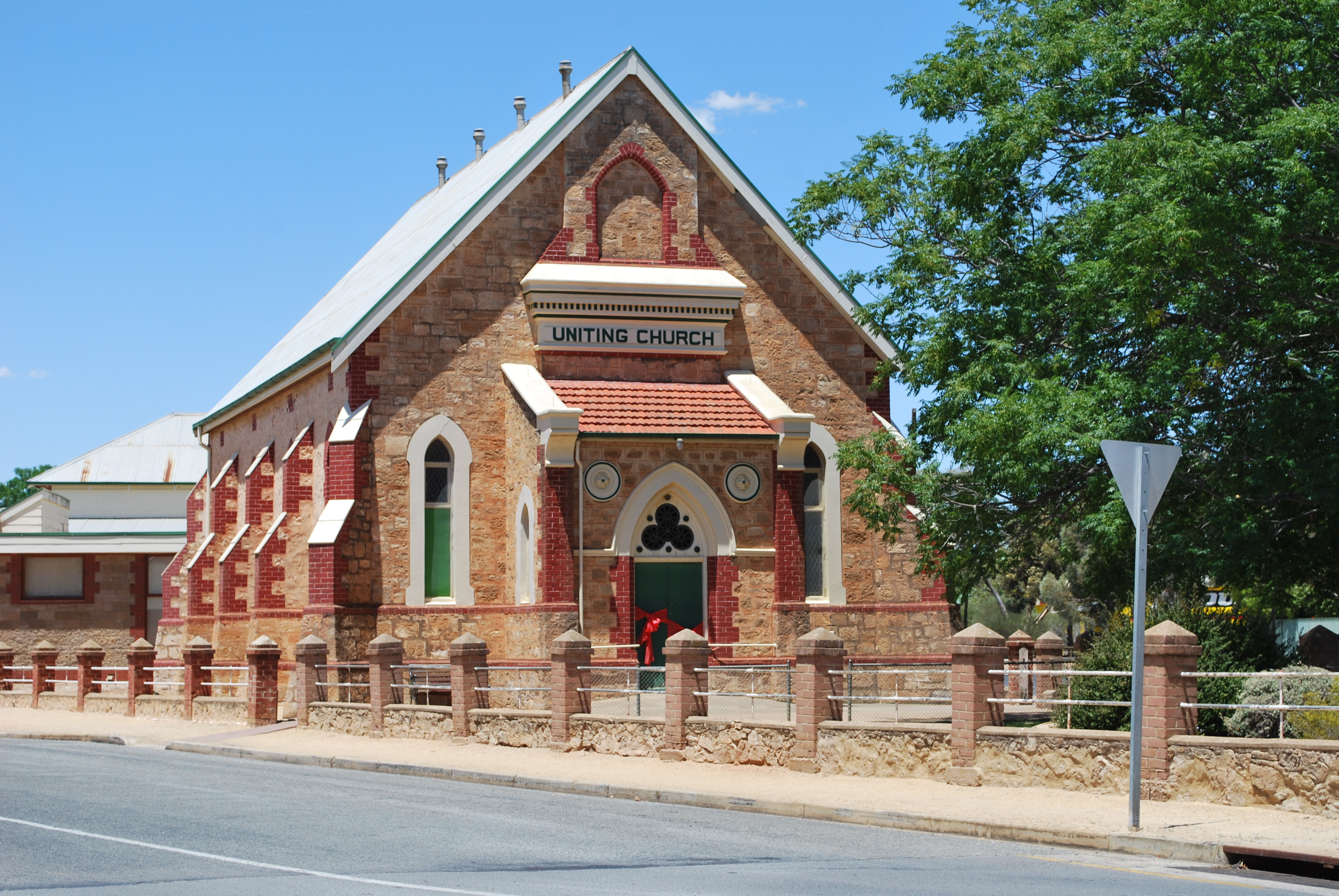
Uniting church

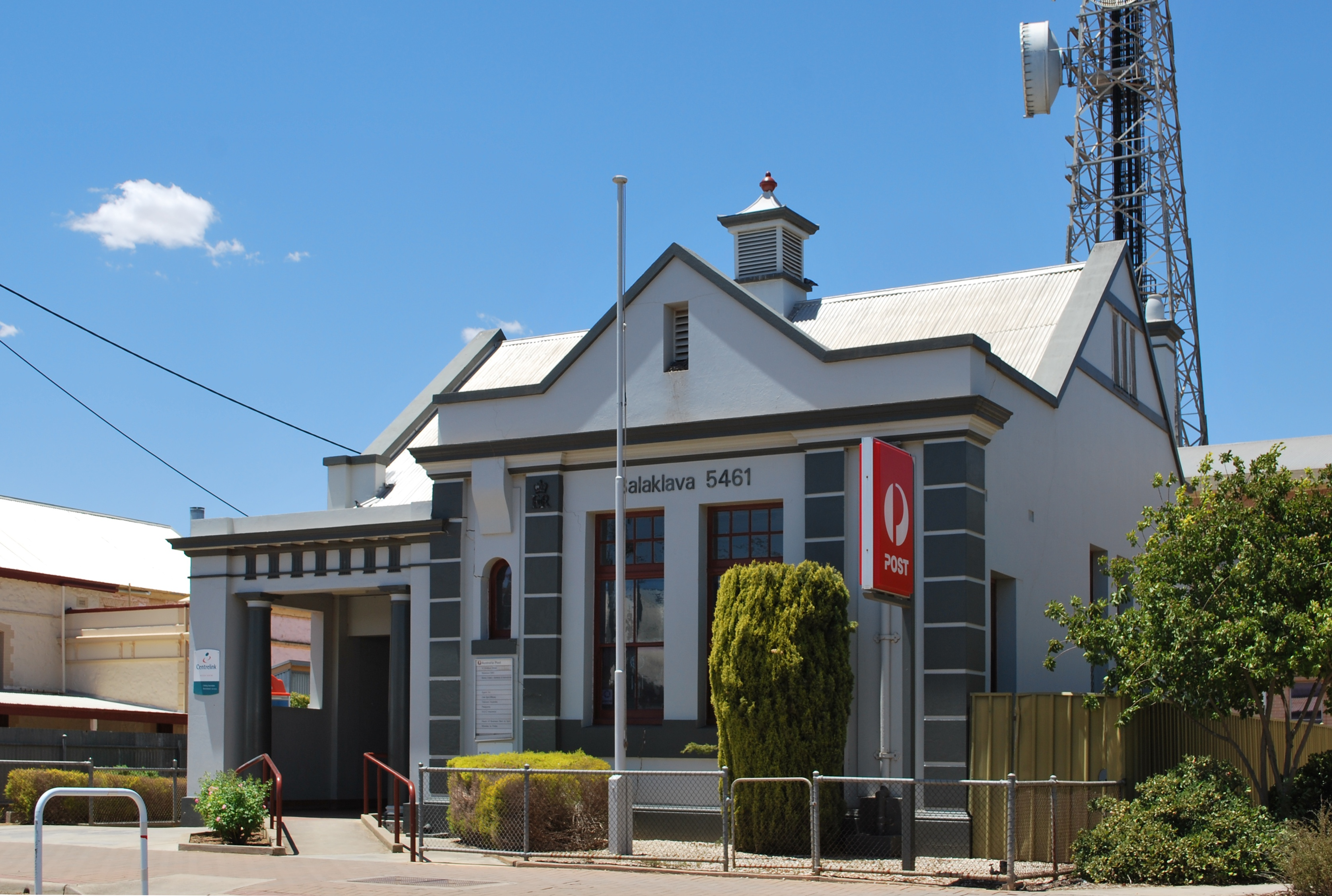
Post office

== See also ==
- List of cities and towns in South Australia
- Lands administrative divisions of South Australia
