= Dublin, South Australia =

Dublin
- Town
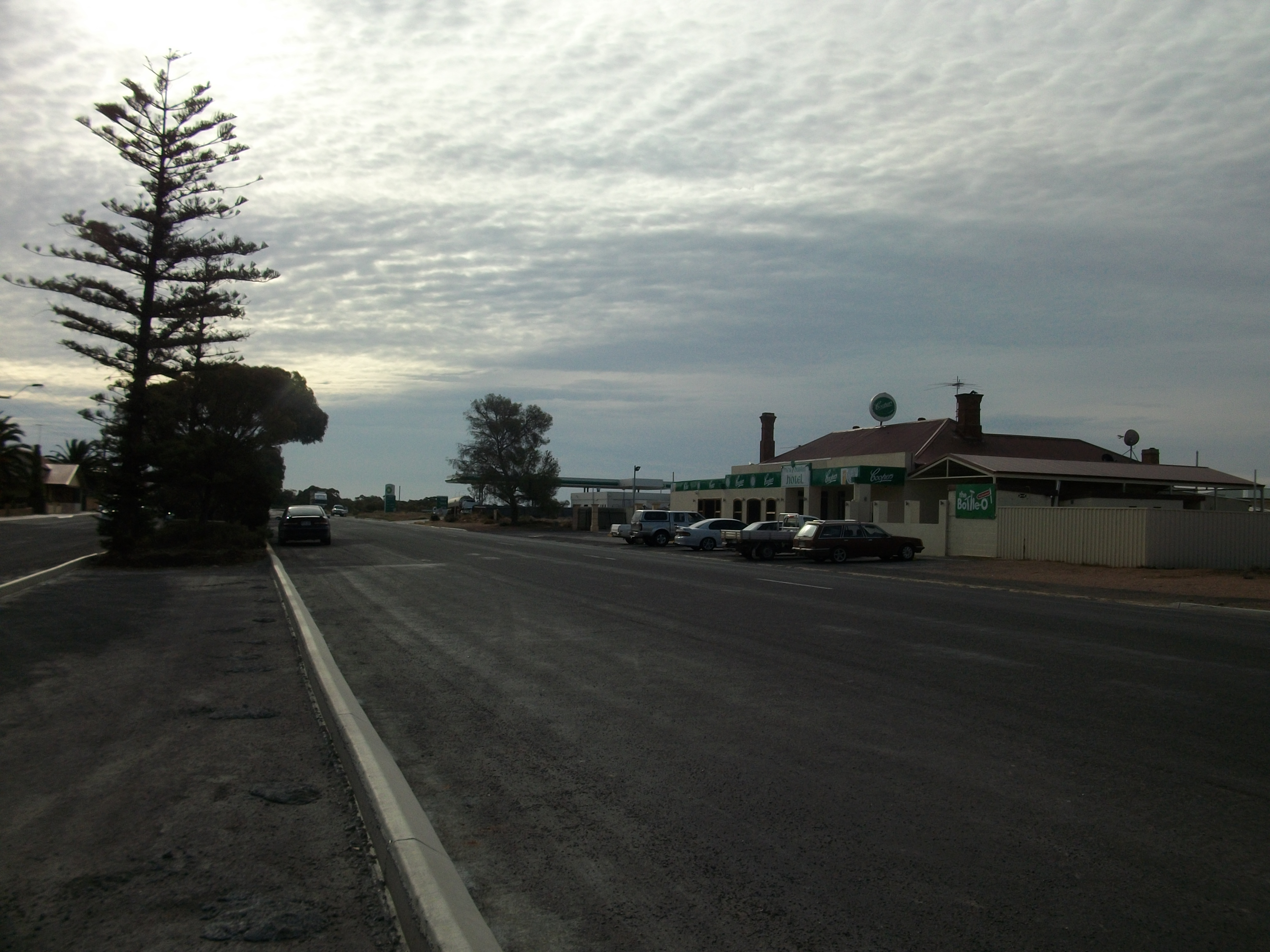
- Dublin South Australia

- Coordinates: 34°27′0″S 138°21′0″E
- Country: Australia
- State: South Australia
- Region: Northern Adelaide Plains
- LGA: Adelaide Plains Council
- Location: 61 km (38 mi) N of Adelaide; 45 km (28 mi) NW of Gawler; 16 km (9.9 mi) W of Mallala

Government
  - State electorate: Narungga
  - Federal division: Grey

Population
  - Total: 405 (SAL 2021)
- Postcode: 5501
- County: Gawler
Localities around Dublin
Parham	Windsor	Calomba
Webb Beach/Gulf St Vincent	Dublin	Mallala
Thompson Beach	Lower Light	Lower Light

Dublin is a small town on the Adelaide Plains in South Australia, 61 kilometres (38 mi) north of the state capital, Adelaide. Situated on Highway 1, the town is surrounded by farmland and rural industry. Along with nearby Windsor, the area is home to a growing commuter population. At the 2006 census, Dublin had a population of 241.

Dublin is in the federal Division of Grey, the state electoral district of Narungga and the Adelaide Plains Council. Dublin lies in the cadastral Hundred of Dublin which was named in 1856 after the Irish capital, Dublin.

The South Australian Livestock Exchange saleyards are located southeast of the township, replacing earlier saleyards closer to Adelaide at Gepps Cross in 1999 for sheep, lambs and pigs, and 2003 for cattle.

There were two schools, one in the town and another at Stony Point junction. The Stony Point School was on the corner of Dublin Road, Windsor Road and Shannon Road from 1876 to 1906. The Dublin School was from 1881 to 1972.

The Dublin Football Club amalgamated with Wild Horse Plains in 1921 and Long Plains to form United.

== Gallery ==
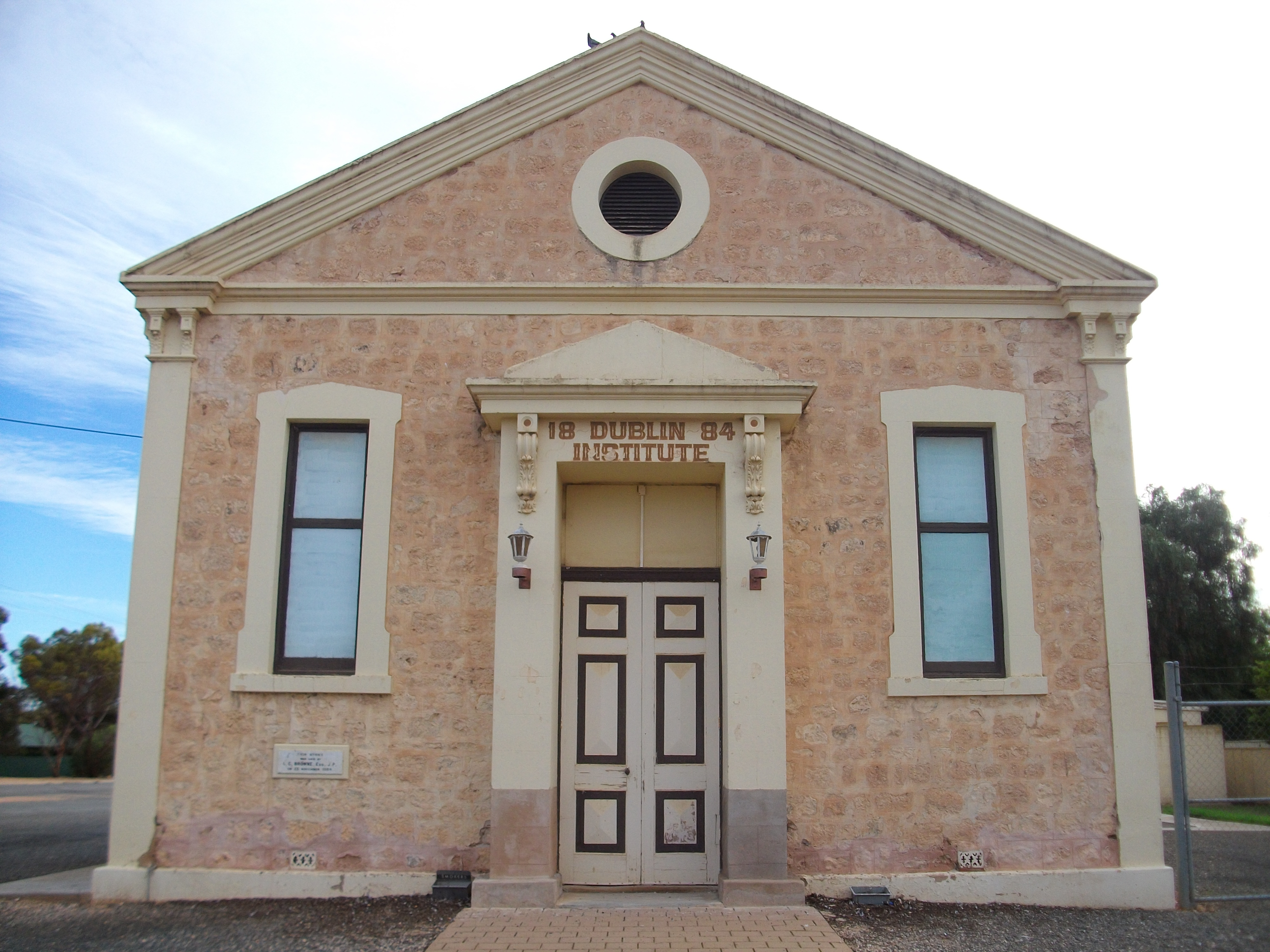
Dublin Town Hall

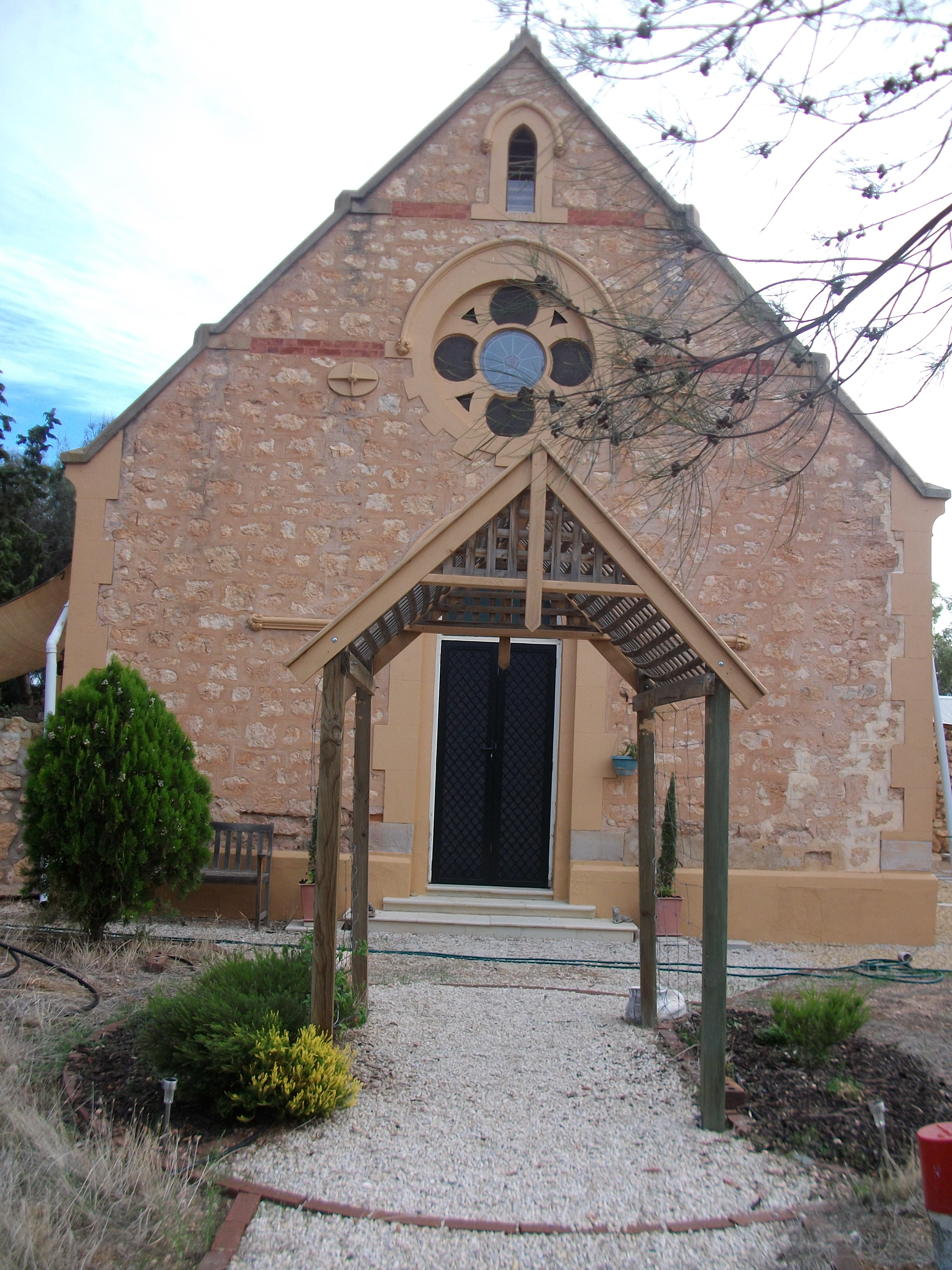
Uniting Church

== See also ==
- District Council of Dublin
- List of cities and towns in South Australia
- Adelaide International Bird Sanctuary National Park—Winaityinaityi Pangkara
