= Avon, South Australia =

Avon
- Town
- Coordinates: 34°17′S 138°20′E
- Country: Australia
- State: South Australia

Government
  - State electorates: Frome (2022); Narungga (2018)
  - Federal division: Grey
- Elevation: 32 m (105 ft)

Population
  - Total: 64 (2021 census)
- Postcode: 5501
Localities around Avon
Kallora		Erith
Inkerman	Avon	Pinery
Wild Horse Plains	Long Plains

Avon is a locality, former rail siding and former township between Bowmans and Long Plains in the Mid North region of South Australia. The railway station was on the Adelaide–Port Augusta railway line.

The name "Avon" was taken from the Avon Farm settled by the Woods family in 1889. There was a school, post office store and church. The school opened in 1913. A Sunday school hall was built in 1923 and community hall in 1960.
