= Adelaide Plains Council =

Coordinates: 34°26′16″S 138°30′45″E

- Local government area
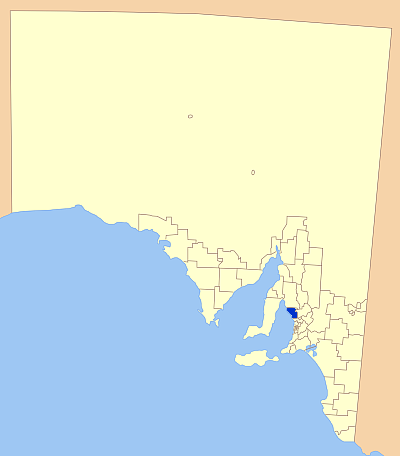
- Location of the Adelaide Plains Council

- Interactive map of Adelaide Plains Council
- Country: Australia
- State: South Australia
- Region: Barossa Light and Lower North
- Established: 1935, renamed 15 April 1937
- Council seat: Mallala

Government
  - Mayor: Mark Wasley
  - State electorate: Goyder, Taylor
  - Federal division: Grey

Area
  - Total: 932.1 km^{2} (359.9 sq mi)

Population
  - Total: 9,835 (LGA 2021)
  - Density: 10.55/km^{2} (27.3/sq mi)
- Website: Adelaide Plains Council
LGAs around Adelaide Plains Council
Wakefield Regional Council
Adelaide Plains Council	Light Regional Council
City of Playford

The Adelaide Plains Council (formerly the District Council of Mallala) is a local government area in South Australia. It consists of a largely rural region along the Gulf St Vincent, covering a total area of approximately 926 km^{2}. The council seat lies at Mallala, but it also maintains a service centre at Two Wells.

== Description ==
Both the Light River and the Gawler River pass through the district and the rich fertile plains are ideal for vegetable production, the majority of which is sent to the nearby Adelaide markets. As well as the general agricultural pursuits of grain growing and storage and running livestock, other major industries in the region include the livestock market / sale yards, metal fabrication and manufacture of industrial equipment.

== History ==
The District Council of Light was proclaimed on 21 March 1935, having stemmed from the amalgamation of the District Council of Grace, the District Council of Dublin and the District Council of Port Gawler. It is unrelated to either the earlier or later councils also named District Council of Light, both of which were predecessors of the adjacent Light Regional Council.

In 1936, the council petitioned the state government to have its name changed citing an existing problem with correspondence intended for the Council being addressed to towns situated outside its boundaries in the cadastral unit of the Hundred of Light and that the recent creation of the electoral district of Light which was also outside of its boundaries would “cause further confusion.” The change was granted and the renaming of the council as the District Council of Mallala was gazetted on 15 April 1937.

The first white settlement of the area dates back to the Port Gawler Special Survey in 1839. Originally the land was inhabited by the Kaurna people whose territory extended in a narrow corridor along the eastern shore of Gulf St Vincent; Cape Jervis to Port Wakefield; inland to near Crystal Brook, Snowtown, Blyth, Hoyleton, Hamley Bridge, Clarendon, Gawler, and Myponga; from the east side of the Hummock Range to Red Hill. Inland the stringy bark forests of the Mount Lofty Ranges marked their boundary.

Throughout the district large tracts of surveyed land were allotted to pastoralists who farmed mostly grain and sheep. The early produce of the area was often shipped out on ketches from the Ports of Gawler and Parham.

In 1986, the council was reported as having an area of 926.7 square kilometres (357.8 sq mi) and a population of about 3940 with most population growth occurring in the southern part of the council area around the town of Two Wells. The principal industries were agriculture and salt mining with the former consisting of market gardening in the vicinity of the Gawler River with the remainder of the district being used for cereal growing, stock grazing and dairying, and with the latter being concerned with salt extraction via evaporation at sites along the coastline.

In September 2016, the council's name was changed to be Adelaide Plains Council, reflecting its extent and location on the northern Adelaide Plains.

== Geography ==
The Adelaide Plains Council includes the towns and localities of Calomba, Dublin, Fischer, Korunye, Lewiston, Lower Light, Mallala, Middle Beach, Parham, Port Gawler, Redbanks, Thompson Beach, Two Wells, Webb Beach and Windsor, and parts of Barabba, Grace Plains, Long Plains, Reeves Plains and Wild Horse Plains.

== Councillors ==
Ward	Councillor	Notes
Mayor	Mark Wasley	
Area Councillors	Marcus Strudwicke	
Area Councillors	Alana Bombardieri	
Area Councillors	Kay Boon	
Area Councillors	Terry-Anne Keen	
Area Councillors	Dante Mazzeo	
Area Councillors	Margherita Panella	
Area Councillors	David Paton	Deputy Mayor
Area Councillors	Eddie Stubing	
Area Councillors	John Lush (Former)	On 5 October 2023, Councillor John Lush formally resigned from his position as an elected member.

The Adelaide Plains Council has a directly-elected mayor.

On 9 December 2021 a Government Gazette announced that a review of the Adelaide Plains Council's composition and elector representation arrangements had occurred and been certified, the following arrangements took effect from polling day of the periodic Local Government Elections held in November 2022.

- The principal member of Council shall continue to be a Mayor elected by the Community.
- The Council area will not be divided into wards (i.e. wards will be abolished).
- The future elected body of Council will consist of the Mayor and nine area councillors, all of whom will represent the whole of the Council area and shall be elected by the community at council-wide elections.

=== Former chairmen ===
The following persons were elected to serve as chairman of the council for the following terms:

- Edmund Albert Charles Brooks (1935–51)
- Arthur David Prime (1951–55)
- Albert Sydney Helps (1956–62)
- Leslie Rupert Hart (1962–64)
- Maxwell Howard Marshman (1964–70)
- Allan Reginald Hart (1970–75)
- Roy Arthur Bache (1975–79)
- Lancelot Arthur Davies (1979–82)
- Leon George Broster (1982–86)
- Bill Forby (1986–89)
- Ian O'Loan (1989–93)
- Mark Cody (1993–94)
- Ian O’Loan (1994–97)
- Michael Picard (1997–2000)
- Margaret Gameau (2000–2006)
- Marcus Strudwicke (2006–2007)
- Steve Kennedy (2007–2009)
- Marcus Strudwicke (2009–2014)
- Duncan Kennington (2014–2016)
- Tony Flaherty (2016–2018)

== See also ==
- List of parks and gardens in rural South Australia
