= Calomba, South Australia =

Calomba South Australia
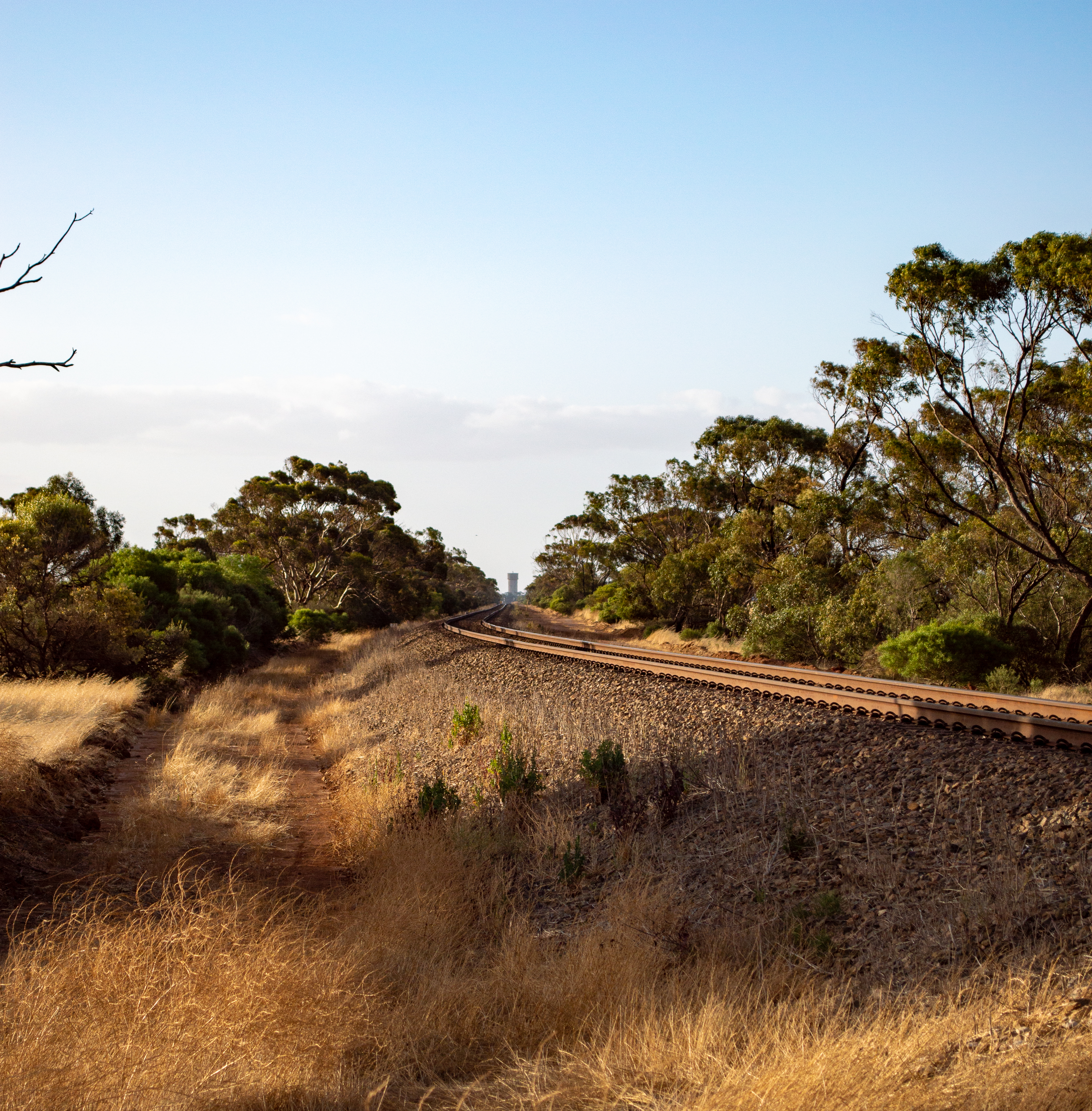
- Long Plains watertower as seen from Calomba

- Coordinates: 34.393°S 138.419°E
- Population: 46 (SAL 2021)
- Postcode(s): 5501
- LGA(s): Adelaide Plains Council
- State electorate(s): Narungga
- Federal division(s): Grey
Localities around Calomba:
| Long Plains | Pinery | Pinery |
| Windsor | Calomba | Grace Plains |
| Dublin | Dublin | Mallala |
- Footnotes: Coordinates; Adjoining localities

Calomba is a rural locality in South Australia, situated in the Adelaide Plains Council. The formal boundaries were established in 1997 for the long established local name. The place name is supposed to have come from Trigonella suavissima, a native plant also known as calomba.

It had a former railway siding, located between Mallala and Long Plains on the Adelaide-Port Augusta railway line. The area was formerly known as Shannon, but the railway station was named Calomba at its opening in 1916 due to the presence of another "Shannon" in the state.

A postal receiving office at Calomba opened in April 1920, became a post office in January 1921, and closed on 19 January 1975. It shared a premises with the local store.

The district had a school at Stoney Point junction

The town was severely damaged by a bushfire in 1948, with almost £100,000 worth of damage being incurred. Three buildings in the main street were destroyed, including the post office and store; a church, homes and farm equipment were also lost.

The Shannon Methodist Church was opened in 1872, closed in 1957 and demolished in 1965.
