= Proof Range, South Australia =

Proof Range South Australia
- Coordinates: 34.25585211°S 138.18106110°E; Location; Climate
- Population: 20 (SAL 2021)
- Established: 2000
- Postcode(s): 5550
- Time zone: ACST (UTC+9:30)
  - Summer (DST): ACST (UTC+10:30)
- Location: 84 km (52 mi) NNW of Adelaide; 6 km (4 mi) S of Port Wakefield
- LGA(s): Wakefield Regional Council
- State electorate(s): Narungga
- Federal division(s): Grey
Mean max temp	Mean min temp	Annual rainfall
22.6 °C; 73 °F	10.7 °C; 51 °F	330.9 mm 13 in
Localities around Proof Range:
Port Wakefield	Port Wakefield	Port Wakefield
Port Wakefield	Proof Range	Inkerman
Gulf St Vincent	Wild Horse Plains	Wild Horse Plains
- Footnotes: Adjoining localities

Proof Range is a locality in the Australian state of South Australia located on the eastern coastline of Gulf St Vincent about 74 kilometres (46 miles) north-northwest of the state capital of Adelaide and about 6 kilometres (3.7 miles) south of the town centre of Port Wakefield. Its boundaries were created in January 2000 in respect of the “long established name.” Its name is derived from the use of the land within its extent for the testing of weapons and ammunition as part of the Port Wakefield Proof and Experimental Establishment. Proof Range is located within the federal Division of Grey, the state electoral district of Narungga and the local government area known as the Wakefield Regional Council.

== See also ==
- List of cities and towns in South Australia
