= Thompson Beach, South Australia =

Thompson Beach South Australia
- Coordinates: 34.48639588°S 138.28388254°E
- Population: 219 (SAL 2021)
- Established: 1997
- Postcode(s): 5501
- Time zone: ACST (UTC+9:30)
  - Summer (DST): ACST (UTC+10:30)
- Location: 56 km (35 mi) north of Adelaide city centre
- LGA(s): Adelaide Plains Council
- State electorate(s): Narungga
- Federal division(s): Grey
Mean max temp	Mean min temp	Annual rainfall
22.7 °C; 73 °F	11.1 °C; 52 °F	430.1 mm 16.9 in
Suburbs around Thompson Beach:
	Dublin	Dublin
Gulf St Vincent	Thompson Beach	Dublin
	Lower Light	Lower Light
- Footnotes: Location; Coordinates; Climate; Adjoining localities

Thompson Beach is a locality in the Australian state of South Australia located on the eastern coastline of Gulf St Vincent about 56 kilometres (35 miles) north of the Adelaide city centre. Thompson Beach started as a sub-division in 1980 with boundaries being created in June 1997. Land use with the locality is principally residential with built development being of a ‘low density’. Thompson Beach is located within the federal Division of Grey, the state electoral district of Narungga, and the local government area of the Adelaide Plains Council.

== Crabbing ==
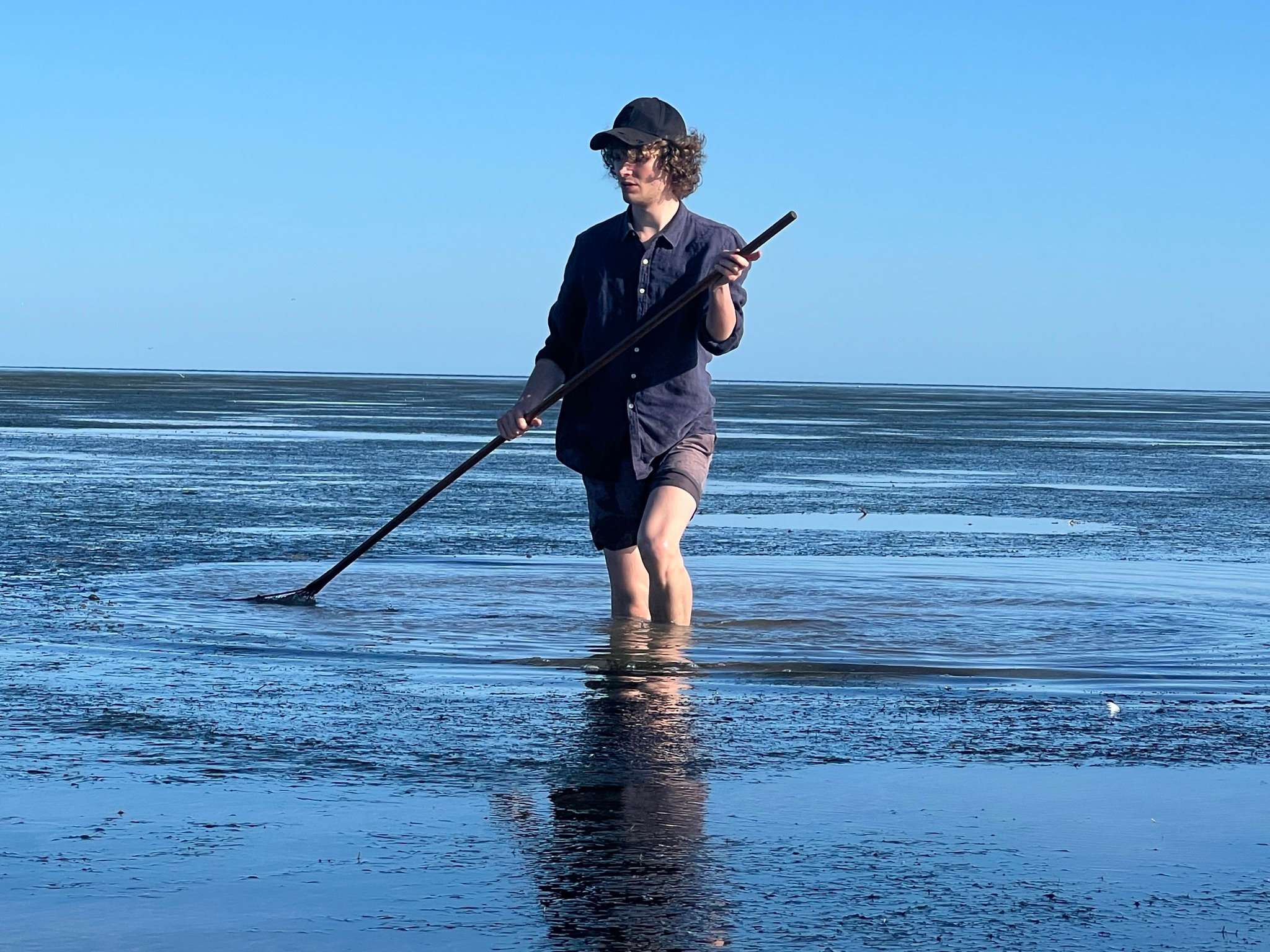
A typical crabber at Thompson Beach. Note the use of a specialised crab rake.

Thompson Beach is particularly known for its blue swimmer crabs, with the prime season being from October to April. The beach has an extremely gradual incline, allowing a fisherman to walk several hundred meters out to sea during low tide while the water remains below knee level: this provides a vast area for crabbing. Special crab rakes are employed to capture these crabs around seagrass patches. It is advised to handle the crabs gently to prevent damage and adhere to strict limits enforced by the PIRSA: a personal daily bag limit of 20 (combined with sand crabs), a daily boat limit of 60 (for groups of 3 or more), and a minimum legal size of 11 cm. Females with external eggs must be released immediately.

In recent years, a greater emphasis has been put on sustainable practices to preserve this ecosystem, encouraging a relaxed approach that minimizes harm to the crabs and their habitat.

== See also ==
- Thompson (disambiguation)
