= Parham, South Australia =

Parham South Australia
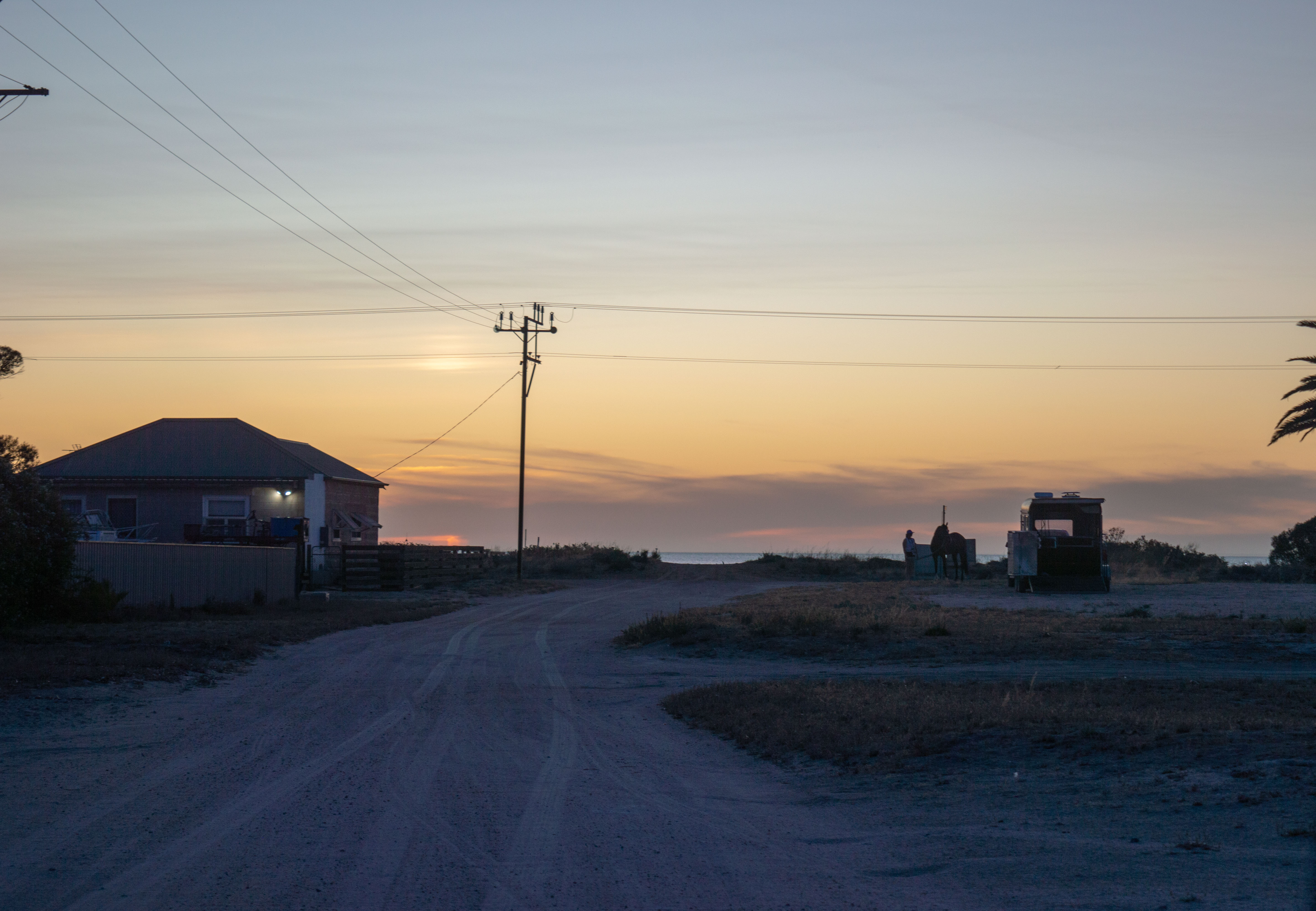
- Main Street, Parham

- Coordinates: 34°25′51″S 138°15′30″E
- Population: 227 (UCL 2021)
- Established: 27 July 1876 (town); 5 June 1997 (locality)
- Postcode(s): 5501
- Time zone: ACST (UTC+9:30)
  - Summer (DST): ACST (UTC+10:30)
- Location: 63 km (39 mi) NNW of Adelaide; 23 km (14 mi) W of Mallala
- LGA(s): Adelaide Plains Council
- Region: Barossa Light and Lower North
- County: Gawler
- State electorate(s): Narungga
- Federal division(s): Grey
Localities around Parham:
Gulf St Vincent	Windsor	Windsor
Gulf St Vincent	Parham	Windsor; Dublin
Gulf St Vincent	Webb Beach	Dublin
- Footnotes: Adjoining localities

Parham (also known as Port Parham in some sources) is a town and a locality in the Australian state of South Australia located on the eastern coastline of Gulf St Vincent about 63 kilometres (39 miles) north-northwest of the state capital of Adelaide and about 23 kilometres (14 miles) west of the municipal seat of Mallala.

Parham was proclaimed as a government town on 7 July 1876 with its boundaries being extended on 24 January 1980. The boundaries for the locality of same name and which includes the extent of the government town were proclaimed on 5 June 1997. It is reported as being named after John Pocock Parham, an early settler who arrived in South Australia in 1839. It was also historically known locally as Dublin Beach. It was known as the Dublin landing place as early as 1871. with shipping recorded from 1870s. Prior to the Government Town and well before the railway reaching Calomba and Long Plains, Parham was the site of a major port for shipping grain to Port Adelaide from the Northern Adelaide Plains.

The 2016 Australian census which was conducted in August 2016 reports that Parham had a population of 216 people.

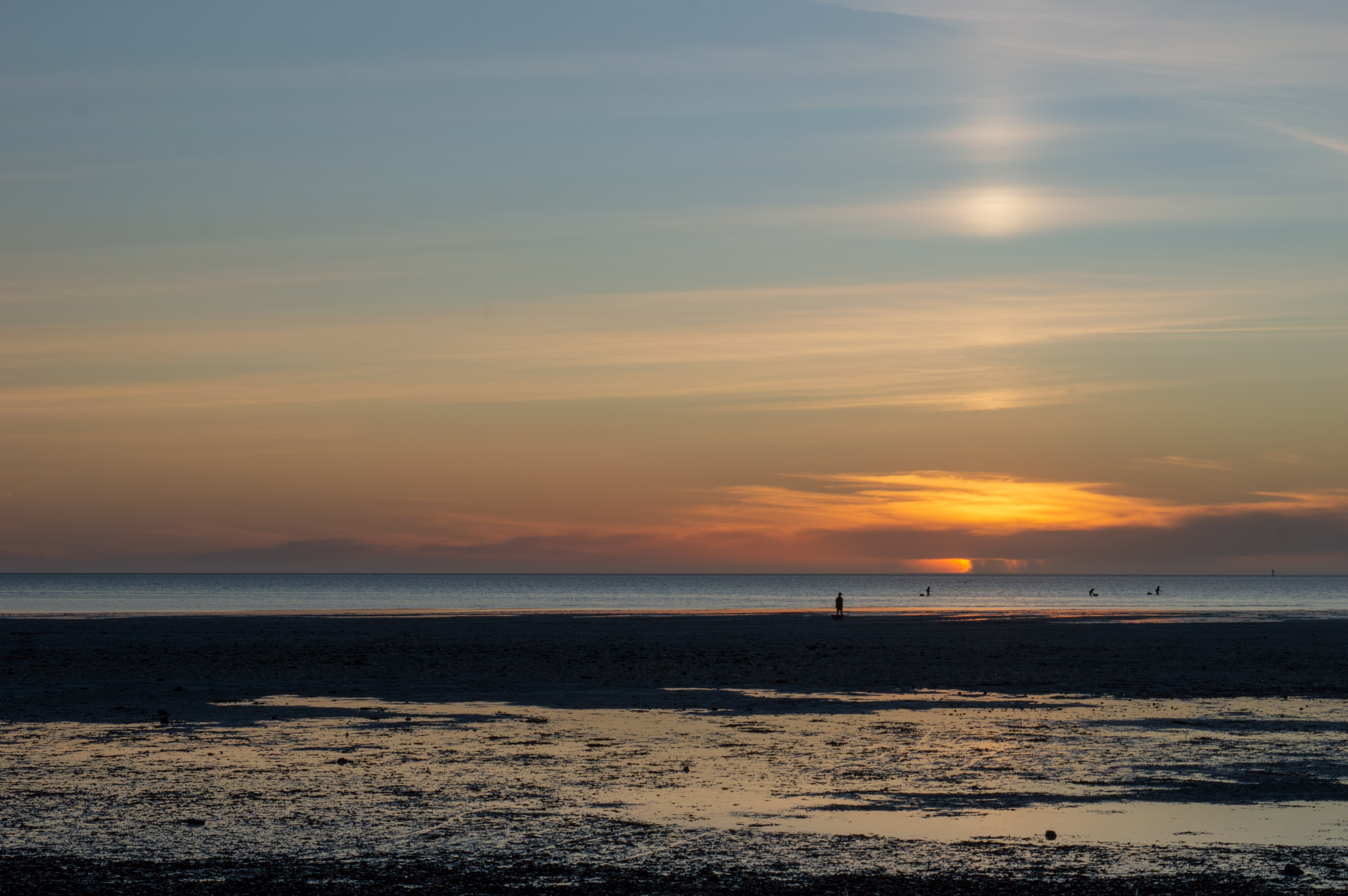
Crabbers at Port Parham Beach

Today, Parham is a holiday and recreational fishing settlement, famous for blue swimmer crabs. In the past was a port for Ketches shipping grain and for shell grit.

Parham is located within the federal division of Grey, the state electoral district Narungga, and the local government area of the Adelaide Plains Council.

== See also ==
- List of cities and towns in South Australia
