= Webb Beach, South Australia =

Webb Beach South Australia
- Coordinates: 34°26′43″S 138°15′36″E
- Population: 40 (SAL 2021)
- Postcode(s): 5501
- Time zone: ACST (UTC+9:30)
  - Summer (DST): ACST (UTC+10:30)
- Location: 62 km (39 mi) NNW of Adelaide; 22 km (14 mi) W of Mallala; 1.5 km (1 mi) S of Parham
- LGA(s): Adelaide Plains Council
- State electorate(s): Narungga
- Federal division(s): Grey
Localities around Webb Beach:
Gulf St Vincent	Parham	Dublin
Gulf St Vincent	Webb Beach	Dublin
Gulf St Vincent	Dublin	Dublin
- Footnotes: Adjoining localities

Webb Beach is a locality in the Australian state of South Australia located on the eastern coastline of Gulf St Vincent about 62 kilometres (39 miles) north-northwest of the state capital of Adelaide. The 2016 Australian census which was conducted in August 2016 reports that it had a population of 47 people. Webb Beach is located within the federal Division of Grey, the state electoral district of Narungga, and the local government area of the Adelaide Plains Council.

== See also ==
- List of cities and towns in South Australia
