= Wild Horse Plains, South Australia =

Wild Horse Plains South Australia
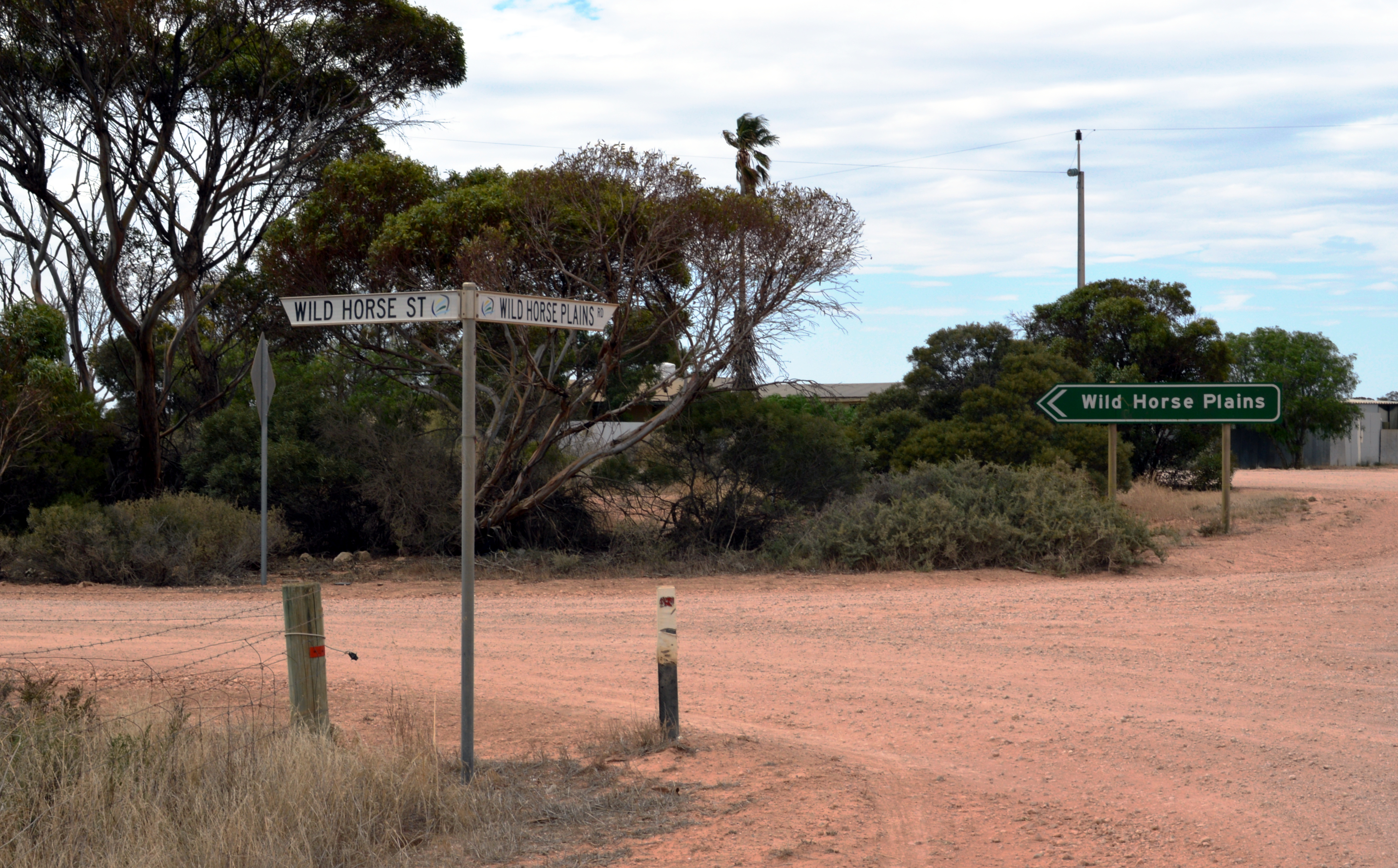

- Coordinates: 34.360070°S 138.293260°E
- Population: 96 (SAL 2021)
- Established: 1881
- Postcode(s): 5501
- Time zone: ACST (UTC+9:30)
  - Summer (DST): ACST (UTC+10:30)
- Location: 69 km (43 mi) NNW of Adelaide city centre; 18 km (11 mi) NW of Mallala
- LGA(s): Adelaide Plains Council
- State electorate(s): Narungga
- Federal division(s): Grey
Localities around Wild Horse Plains:
Proof Range	Inkerman	Avon
Gulf St Vincent	Wild Horse Plains	Long Plains
Gulf St Vincent	Windsor, Parham	Windsor

Wild Horse Plains is a locality in South Australia on the eastern coastline of Gulf St Vincent about 69 kilometres (43 miles) north-northwest of the Adelaide city centre. Its name is attributed to Thomas Day, who found wild horses grazing within the locality around 1870. Its boundaries, created in June 1997, include the town of Wild Horse Plains, established in 1881 on Port Wakefield Road, and the former Government Town of Lorne. Port Lorne Road marks most of the northern boundary of Wild Horse Plains and is the access road to the former township of Lorne.

Wild Horse Plains lies within the federal Division of Grey, the state electoral district of Narungga and the local government area of the Adelaide Plains Council.

The post office opened in 1878, continued as a telephone exchange and closed in 1979.

Wild Horse Plains formally had a school for all ages known as Wild Horse Plains School.

== See also ==
- List of cities and towns in South Australia
