= Long Plains, South Australia =

Long Plains South Australia
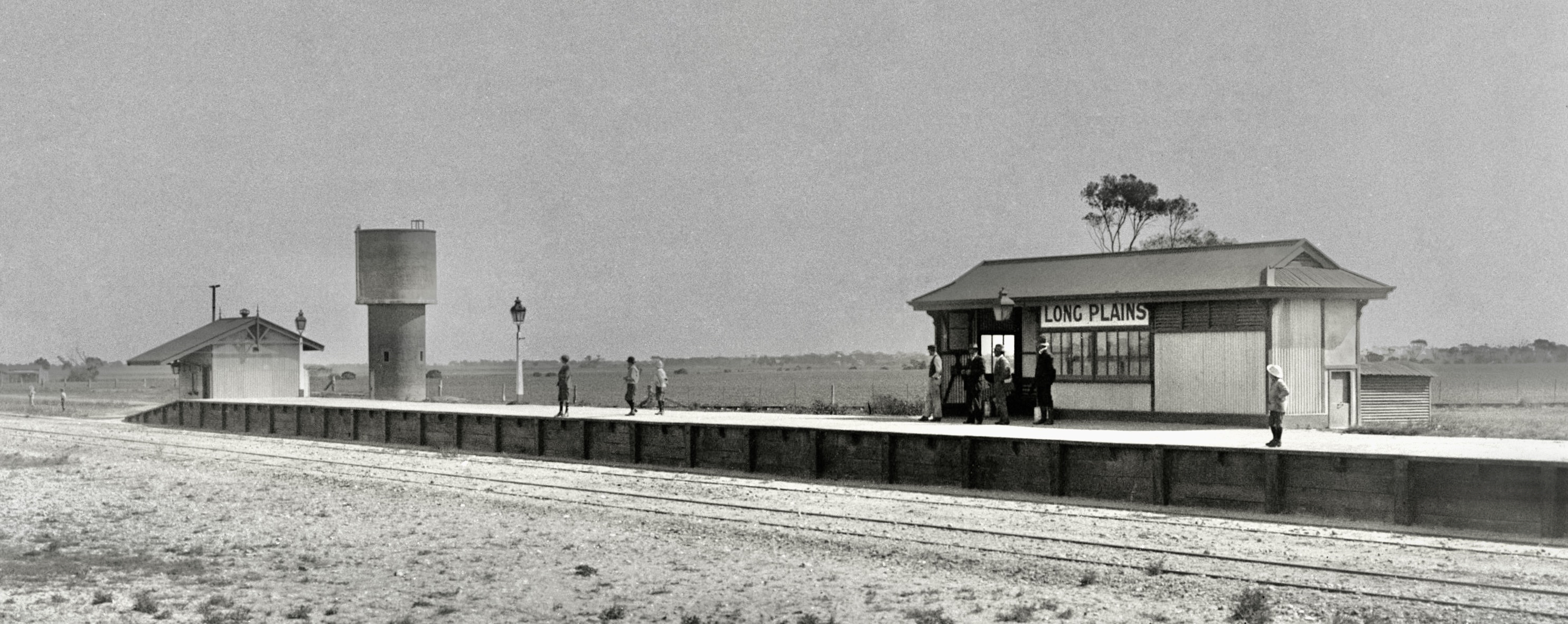
- Long Plains railway station about 1918

- Coordinates: 34.359°S 138.378°E
- Population: 62 (SAL 2021)
- Postcode(s): 5501
- LGA(s): Wakefield Regional Council; Adelaide Plains Council
- State electorate(s): Narungga
- Federal division(s): Grey
Localities around Long Plains:
Avon	Avon	Pinery
Wild Horse Plains	Long Plains	Pinery; Calomba
Windsor	Windsor	Calomba
- Footnotes: Coordinates Adjoining localities

Long Plains is a rural locality and small township on the northern Adelaide Plains in South Australia, 76.8 kilometres (47.7 miles) by road north of Adelaide. It is divided between the Wakefield Regional Council and the Adelaide Plains Council. The formal boundaries were established in 1997 for the long established local name with respect of the section in the Adelaide Plains Council; the portion in the Wakefield Council was added in January 2000.

Long Plains is on the Adelaide-Port Augusta railway line, between Mallala and Bowmans. From 1917 to 1923 Long Plains was the rail terminus. The station no longer exists.

The Long Plains Memorial Hall, built in 1923, commemorates the lives of four local residents who died in World War I.

Long Plains School opened in 1883 and closed in 1973. A former building at the school, added in the 1950s, is now located at the Mallala Museum. A brass band was established by 1880.

Long Plains Post Office opened in 1881 and closed in 1976. It shared premises with the Long Plains Store.

Long Plains Church of Christ opened in 1903, was destroyed in a severe bushfire in 1948, was rebuilt in 1953 and closed in 1981.

The United Football Club is based at Long Plains. The club is also home to netball and other sporting clubs.

The Viterra wheat and barley silos were demolished in October 2022, leaving only the water tower to stand out above the plains.

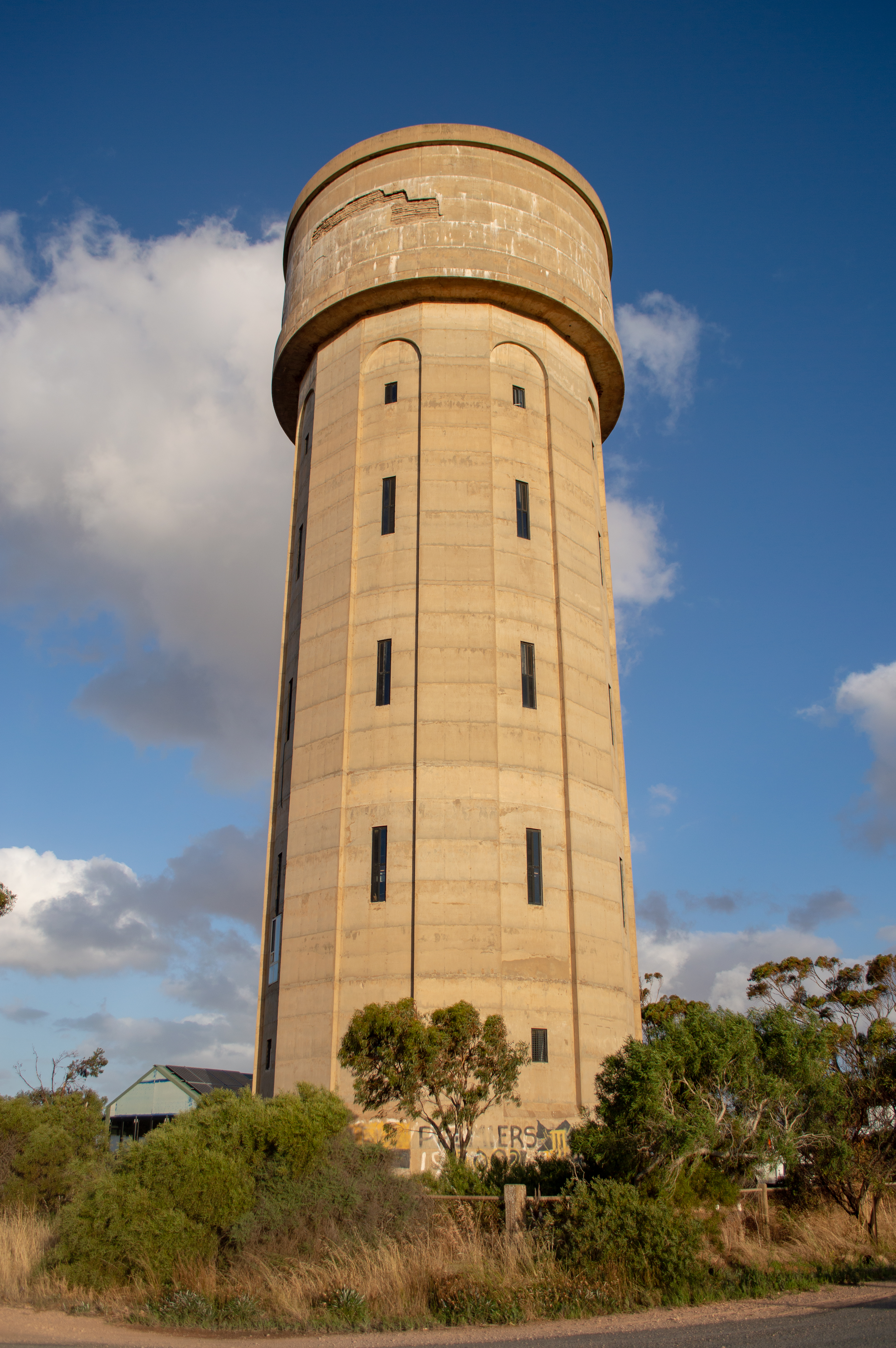
Long Plains water tower in 2020
