= Adelaide Plains =

Coastal plain in South Australia

- other
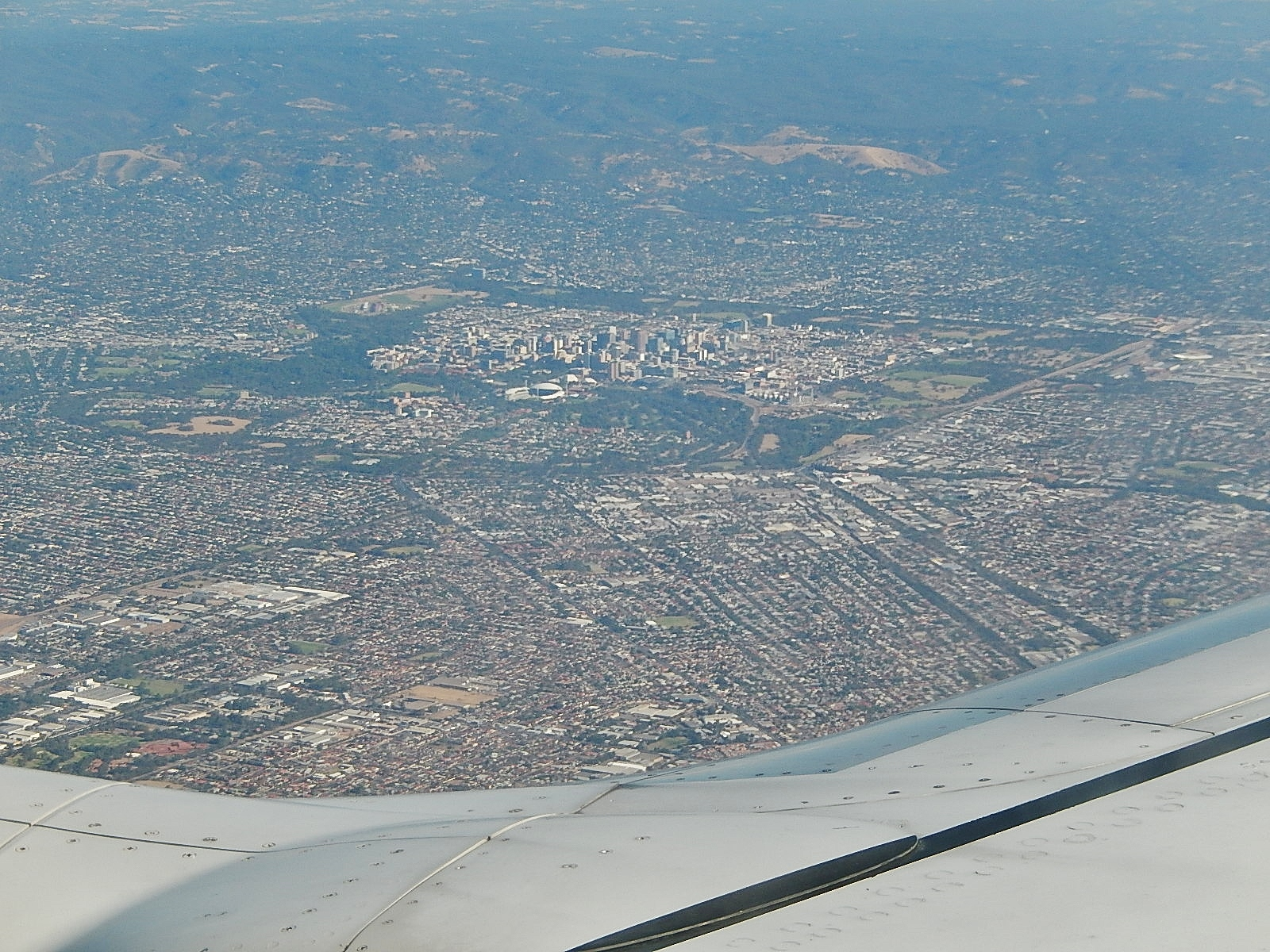
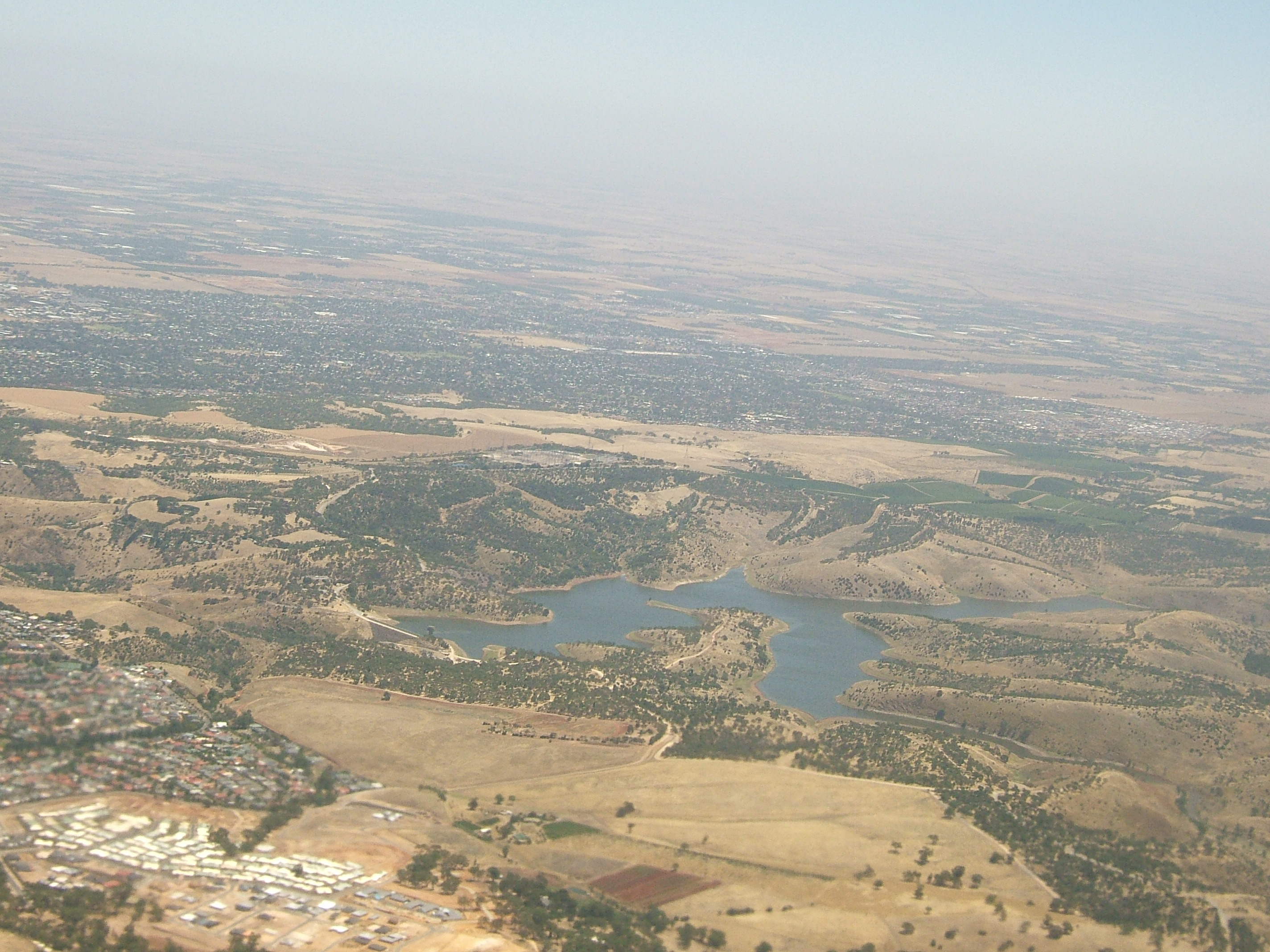
- Aerial view of the Adelaide metropolitan area viewed from above the northern suburbs at the bottom of the image. The city centre is the cluster of buildings in the centre, the Adelaide Hills are centre-right, the eastern suburbs on the far left and the southern suburbs far centre. Northwest regions of the Adelaide Plains. The built-up area in the bottom left corner is Greenwith. The dark dotted areas in the background are the northern suburbs of Adelaide, corresponding to the City of Playford centred around Elizabeth and the mid-area of the Adelaide Plains are further in the background.

- Coordinates: 34°56′21.69″S 138°35′51.25″E
- Country: Australia
- State: South Australia

The Adelaide Plains (Kaurna name Tarndanya) is a plain in South Australia lying between the coast (Gulf St Vincent) on the west and the Mount Lofty Ranges on the east. The southernmost tip of the plain is in the southern seaside suburbs of Adelaide around Brighton at the foot of the O'Halloran Hill escarpment with the south Hummocks Range and Wakefield River roughly approximating the northern boundary.

Traditionally entirely occupied by the Kaurna (indigenous) people, the Adelaide Plains are crossed by a number of rivers and creeks, but several dry up during summer. The rivers (from south to north) include: the Onkaparinga/Ngangki, Sturt/Warri Torrens/Karra Wirra, Little Para, Gawler, Light/Yarralinka and Wakefield/Undalya. The plains are generally fertile with annual rainfall of about 460 millimetres (18 in) per year.

The plain can be roughly divided into three parts. The southern area is now covered by the city of Adelaide, the capital of South Australia. The central area is considered the breadbasket of South Australia with many market gardens and wineries, particularly around the towns of Virginia and Angle Vale. The northern area is predominantly used for growing cereal grains such as wheat, barley, and canola, and farming sheep.

Usage of the term Adelaide Plains frequently refers to a central and non-metropolitan subset of the plain. This is evidenced by the local government area of Adelaide Plains Council, which occupies 932 square kilometres (360 sq mi) from the Gawler River in the south to Wild Horse Plains, Long Plains and Grace Plains north of Dublin and Mallala.

== See also ==
- Adelaide Plains Football League
- Adelaide Plains wine region
- Temperate Grassland of South Australia
