= Hundred of Gregory =

Gregory
- Cadastral division
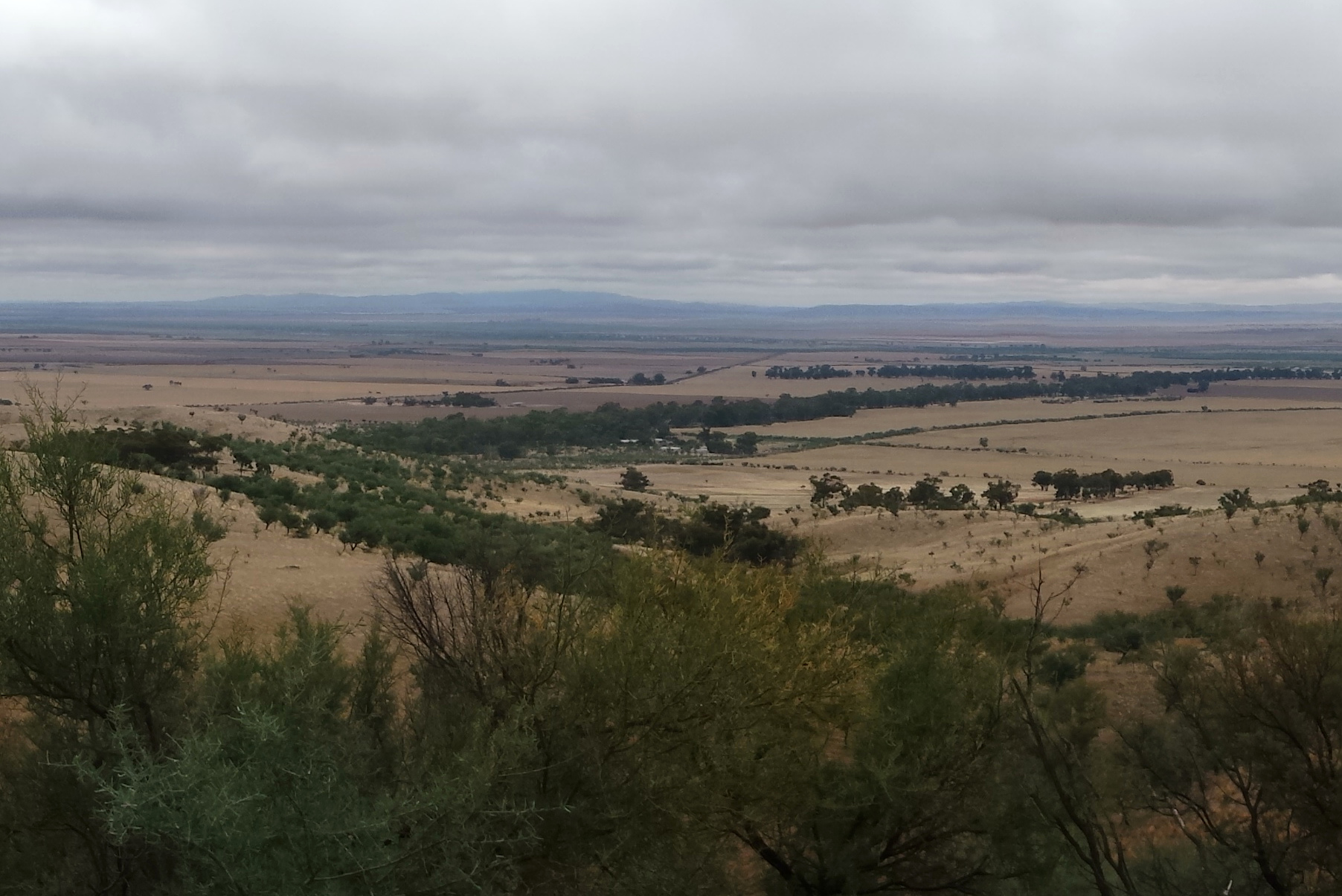
- Willochra Plain from the northern foothills of Mount Remarkable, facing north

- Coordinates: 32.736°S 138.165°E
- Country: Australia
- State: South Australia
- LGA(s): Mount Remarkable
- Established: 12 August 1858

Area
  - Total: 230 km^{2} (90 sq mi)
- County: Frome
Lands administrative divisions around Gregory
Woolundunga	Willochra	Pinda
Winninowie	Gregory	Willowie
Baroota	Wongyarra	Booleroo

The Hundred of Gregory is a cadastral hundred of the County of Frome in South Australia. It was proclaimed by Governor Richard MacDonnell in 1858 and named for the explorer, Augustus Charles Gregory.

The hundred straddles the northern slopes of Mount Remarkable from just north of Melrose to just south of Wilmington. No townships or significant settlements lie within the hundred but the entirety is enclosed within the local bounds of Wilmington in the north and Melrose in the south.

== Local government ==
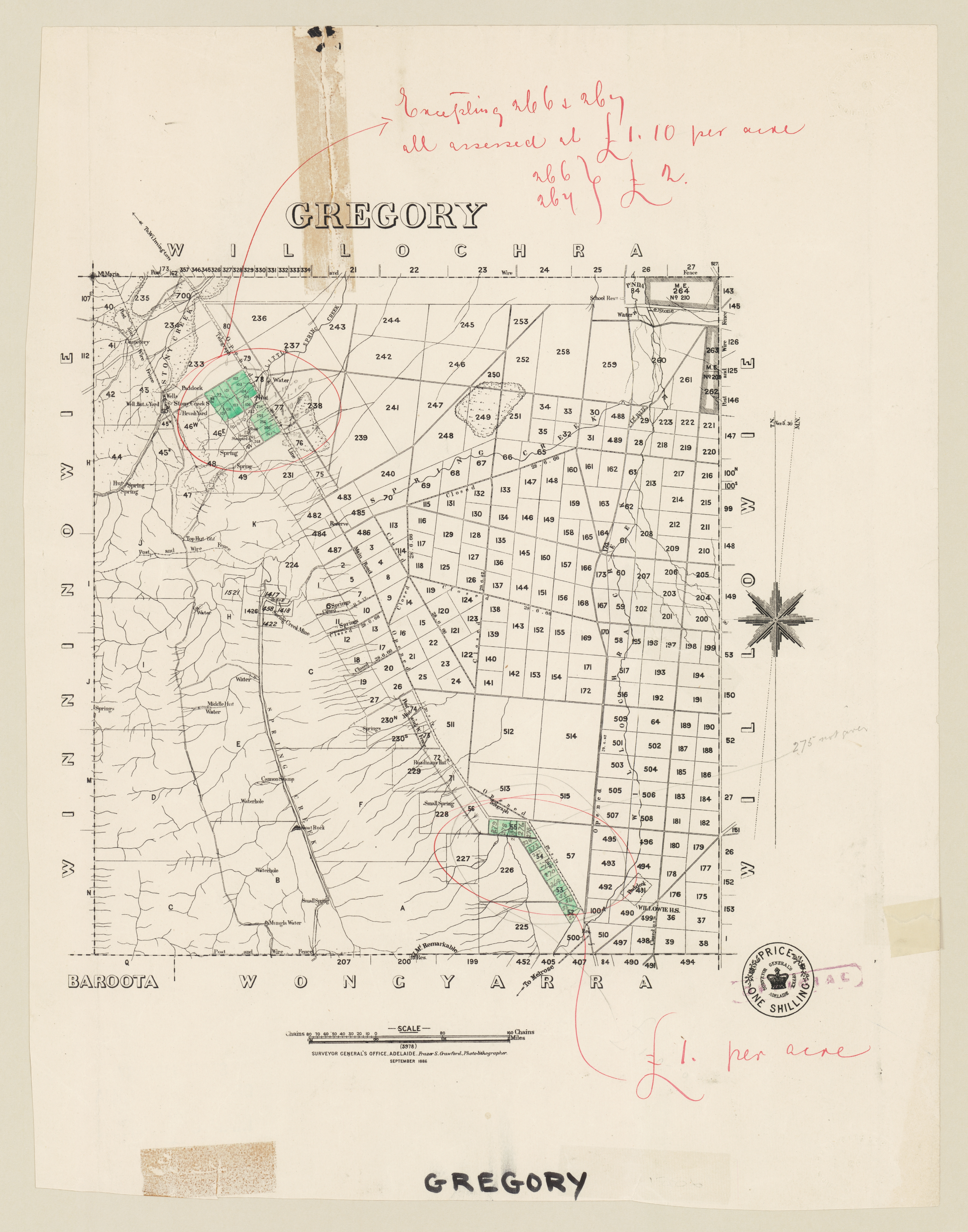
Hundred of Gregory, 1886

The District Council of Wilmington, established in 1888, included the whole of the Hundred of Gregory along with neighbouring hundreds to the north, northeast and east. In 1890 the southern part of the hundred was annexed by the District Council of Port Germein but this was returned to Wilmington in 1933. In 1980 the hundred became a part of the District Council of Mount Remarkable, which was formed by amalgamation of Wilmington and Port Germein councils.
