= Woolundunga =

Woolundunga may refer to:

- Woolundunga, South Australia, a locality
- Woolundunga Station, a pastoral property in South Australia
- District Council of Woolundunga, a former local government area in South Australia
- Hundred of Woolundunga, a cadastral unit
