= Hundred of Boolcunda =

Boolcunda
- Cadastral division
- Coordinates: 32.195°S 138.215°E
- Country: Australia
- State: South Australia
- Established: 6 July 1876

Area
  - Total: 400 km^{2} (156 sq mi)
- County: Newcastle
Lands administrative divisions around Boolcunda
Wyacca	Kanyaka	Cudlamudla
Yarra	Boolcunda	Cudlamudla
Pichi Richi	Palmer	Moockra

The Hundred of Boolcunda is a cadastral hundred of the County of Newcastle in South Australia. It was proclaimed by Governor Anthony Musgrave in 1876.

The principal locality in the hundred is the former township of Willochra.

== Local government ==
Local government was brought to the entire hundred in 1888 with the establishment of the District Council of Kanyaka. In 1969 Kanyaka amalgamated with Quorn council, bringing the hundred under the governance of the District Council of Kanyaka-Quorn. In 1997 the hundred came under the governance of Flinders Ranges Council, with the amalgamation of Kanyaka-Quorn and Hawker councils.

== History ==
The traditional owners of the area are the Ngadjuri people. The first European explorer to the area was Thomas Burr in September 1842. The site of Willochra was surveyed in 1860 but the town never properly developed and was abandoned during the drought in the 1860s.
