= District Council of Wilmington =

District Council of Wilmington South Australia
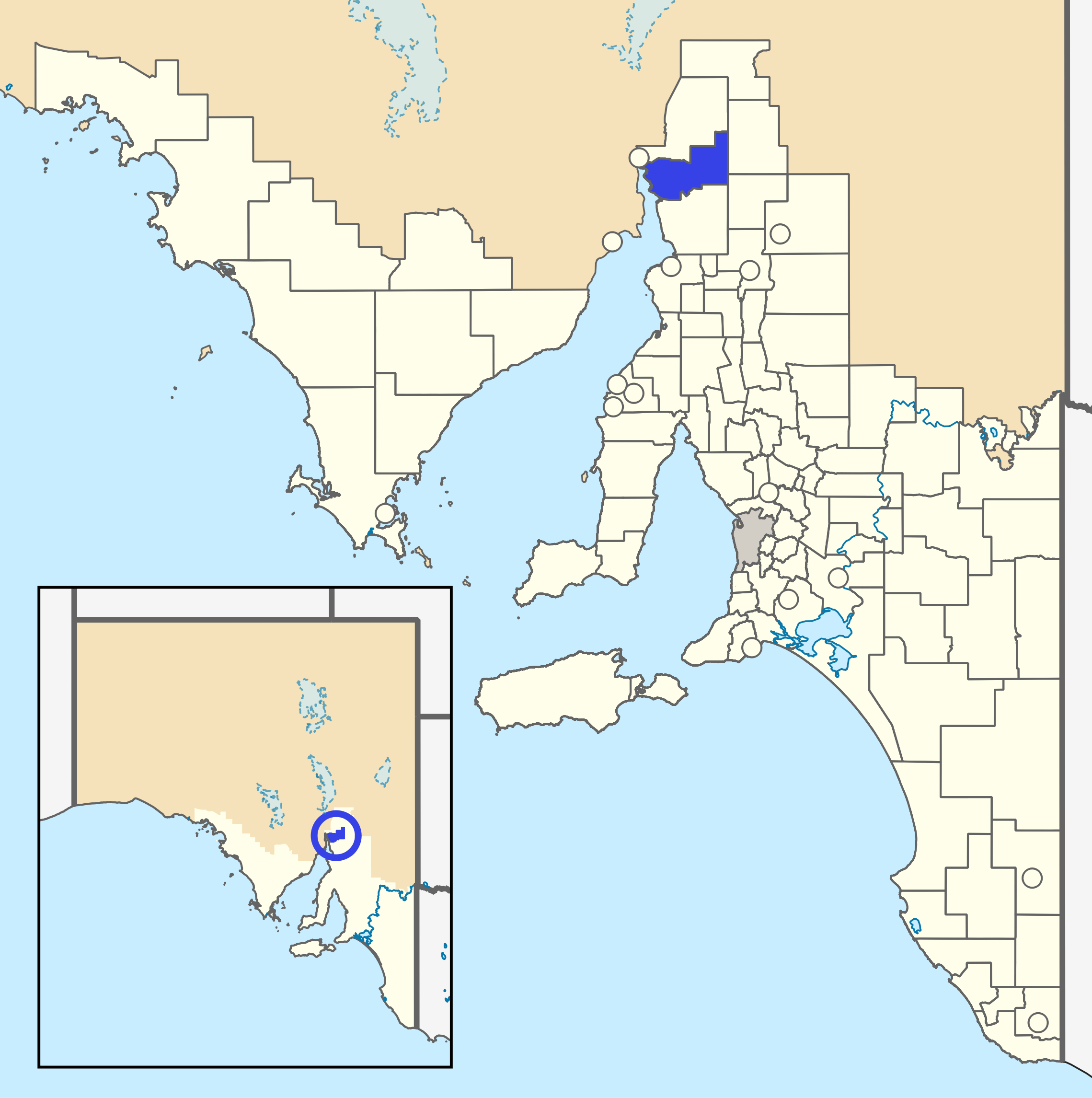
- The District Council of Wilmington as it was prior to disestablishment (blue)
- Coordinates: 32°40′S 138°05′E
- Established: 5 January 1888
- Abolished: 1 July 1980
- Council seat: Wilmington
LGAs around District Council of Wilmington:
| Davenport/ Woolundunga | Quorn; Kanyaka | Carrieton |
| Davenport/ Woolundunga | District Council of Wilmington | Orroroo |
| | Port Germein | Port Germein |

The District Council of Wilmington was a local government area in South Australia, centred on the town of Wilmington from 1888 to 1980.

== History ==
The council was gazetted on 5 January 1888 under the provisions of the District Councils Act 1887, and initially consisted of the cadastral Hundreds of Coonatto, Gregory, Pinda, Willochra and Willowie, and part of the Hundred of Woolundunga. It was divided into five wards (Coonatto, Pinda, Willowie, Wilmington and Willochra) on 5 June 1888, each represented by two councillors. In 1890, it lost the Hundred of Willowie and part of the Hundred of Gregory to the District Council of Port Germein.

It was renamed the District Council of Hammond on 25 May 1893. It lost a large portion of the Hundred of Willochra to the District Council of Kanyaka in the 1890s, and gained the Hundred of Moockra from Kanyaka in 1894. It was a farming and grazing district badly hit by both the depression of the 1890s and the Great Depression in the 1930s, and it was said in 1923 that the Hammond council district had "not progressed to any great extent" "owing to the long dry spells common to districts in the far north". In 1923, the Hammond council had an area of 214,400 acres. It had an estimated population of 732 in 1921, with 250 ratepayers, living in 156 dwellings, with the capital value of ratable property being £145,840.

The council underwent major boundary changes on 16 February 1933 as a result of local government amalgamations at that time: it resumed its former name of Wilmington and incorporated most of the abolished District Council of Woolundunga, and regained the 1890 section of the Hundred of Gregory from the District Council of Port Germein. Council roadworks were still being done manually or with horse-drawn vehicles into the 1940s. It amalgamated with the District Council of Port Germein to form the District Council of Mount Remarkable on 1 July 1980, following boundary changes which had seen Redcliff (now in Miranda) and Stirling North, formerly in Wilmington, annexed to the City of Port Augusta.

== Chairmen ==
- Edward Twopeny – chairman for fifteen years
- Gustav Herman Voigt (1936–1941)
- Samuel James Bartlett (1941–1944)
- Gotthilf Reinhold (Reinie) Schiller (1945–1950)
- Francis Thomas Miller (1950–1951)
- Cecil Abbott Battersby (1951–1955)
- Leonard Gordon Pascoe (1955–1967)
- Graham John Herde (1967–1969)
- James Ignatius Connell (1969–1970)
- Lawrence Ralph Noll (1970–1978)
- Thomas Joseph Case (1978–1980)
