= Nukunu =

Aboriginal people of South Australia

Nukunu are an Aboriginal Australian people of South Australia, living around the Spencer Gulf area. In the years after British colonisation of South Australia, the area was developed to contain the cities of Port Pirie and Port Augusta.

== Name ==
Both the Ngaiawang people of the Lower Murray and the Adelaide region's Kaurna used their variant pronunciation for the Nukuni, nokunno and nokuna, to signify an assassin, a mythical figure who was given to roaming about at night in search of people to kill.

== Language ==
Nukunu language, together with Ngadjuri, with which it has a 90% overlap, is broadly classified by Luise Hercus, following the taxonomy of Wilhelm Schmidt, as belonging to the Miru cluster of the Thura-Yura languages.

== Country ==
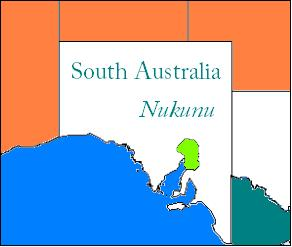
Traditional lands of the Nukunu people

According to Norman Tindale's calculations, the Nukunu possessed approximately 2,200 square miles (5,700 km^{2}) of tribal land. This lay on the eastern side of Spencer Gulf, from a point just north of the mouth of the Broughton River and the vicinity of Crystal Brook to Port Augusta. Their eastern extension ran to Melrose, Mount Remarkable, Gladstone, and Quorn, and they were also present at Baroota.

=== Native title ===
In 2019, the Nukunu people were granted native title over Port Pirie and part of the Flinders Ranges. On 3 February 2022, after a protracted 28-year dispute over boundaries, they were also given title over a large area east of Port Augusta by a sitting of the Federal Court of Australia. Only one of the original claimants, elder Lindsay Thomas, was still alive. This area borders an area granted to the Barngarla people in September 2021. All three court sittings and decisions were presided over by Justice Natalie Charlesworth.

== Social customs ==
The Nukunu were the southeasternmost tribe that adopted not only circumcision but also subincision as part of their rite of initiating young males into full tribal status. The Nukunu took pride in being "ritual purists".

A. P. Elkin established that the Nukunu represented the most southeasterly tribe maintaining a matrilineal moiety system, involving two marriage moieties, the Mathari and the Kararru. The system was essentially akin to that existing among the Barngarla, Adnyamathanha and Wailpi.

== Culture ==
The Nukunu land was full of sacred sites, and formed the starting point for the longest songline registered in Australia, the Urumbula songline. This songline extends from a large tree, representing also the Milky Way, said to stand near the present day Port Augusta Hospital (Point Augusta) northwards right to the Gulf of Carpentaria. The story cycle dealt with the wanderings of the western quoll. The Arerrnte central desert people retain details of the mythical events that are located far south, in Nukunu tribal lands.

== History of contact ==
Colonisation of the area began in 1849, and a late estimate is that the tribe consisted of between 50 and 100 people. Before this, it is thought that the Nukunu had been ravaged by the spread of smallpox from the Murray River, some two decades earlier. The subsequent transformation of the land for pastoral and wheat-growing purposes devastated the Nukunu.

Peter Ferguson and William Younghusband took up a "run" of some 560 square miles (1,500 km^{2}) from Thalpiri, now known as Port Pirie, to Crystal Brook, which was stocked with 25,000 sheep and 3400 cattle. In late June 1852 Ferguson rounded up seven Nukunu after pursuing them to retrieve 54 sheep that had been taken from his flocks and they were remanded at Clare County Court for trial in Adelaide, but were released after two months when no plaintiffs appeared to assist the prosecution. In 1854, after cattle had been pilfered, Ferguson, together with his stockmen, killed a group of local Aboriginal people at Crystal Brook. Writing in 1880, J. C. Valentine stated that only eight Nukunu had survived these radical upheavals, five men and three women; the rest, in his view, had expired from phthisis.

This enclosure of their tribal lands for pastoralism led to the dispossession, and decimation, of the Nukunu from the end of the 1840s onwards, and small remnants took refuge in scattered camps around Orroroo, Melrose, Wilmington, Stirling North, and Baroota. Some Nukunu managed to keep alive their direct attachment to their traditional lands by remaining at Port Germein, the Baroota reserve set aside for them, and at Port Augusta. With their fragmentation and dispersion, they could no longer adhere to their rigorous rules, and subsequently intermarried with people with Narungga, Barngarla and Wirangu descent, while maintaining a keen sense of their Nukunu identity.

== Alternative names ==
- Barutadura (men of Baroota)
- Doora
- Eura (generic ethnonym for several tribes)
- Nookoona, Nukunna, Noocoona, Nokunna
- Nu-guna
- Nugunu
- Nukuna (Barngarla exonym)
- Nukunnu
- Pukunna (misprint)
- Tura (man)
- Tyura
- Warra (name of language)
- Wongaidja (Note: Hercus comments: "Black calls the language 'Wongaidya', but this is simply his rendering of wangkatya the present tense form of the verb 'to speak'." (Hercus 1992, p. 9))

== Some words ==
- kutnyu (white man/ghost) (Note: In Valentine this is given as bingera. (Valentine 1886, p. 138))
- ngami/ngangkayi (mother, breast, Milky Way) (Note: Valentine gives mungier. (Valentine 1886, p. 138))
- nhantu (western grey kangaroo) (Note: Valentine gave kudla. (Valentine 1886, p. 138))
- nyilka (dog); katli (dog, wild or tame); wilka (dog, dingo) (Note: Valentine gave gardley for tame dog, and quana for wild dog. (Valentine 1886, p. 138))
- yartli (father) (Note: Valentine wrote ludlaw. Luise Hercus commenting on this text wrote: 'There is a brief vocabulary from Mount Remarkable, which is in the heart of Nukunu country, but Curr states (2:136) that he got the material from a Mr J. C. Valentine who had himself got it at second hand from "a gentleman well acquainted with the tribe", and he complains of the manuscript being indistinct. There is no question that it is a vocabulary of the same language as recorded by O'Grady and by Hercus and by its early date it helps to validate Nukunu. The person who wrote down the vocabulary had trouble hearing certain sounds and used an inconsistent anglicised transcription, which is difficult to interpret: e.g. he wrote "uree" for yuṛi ("ear"), "ounga" for yunga ("elder brother") and "ludlaw" for yartli ("father" (i.e. "man")).' Hercus also gives maama, var. mamara for father. (Hercus 1992, pp. 9, 21))

== Notable Nukunu people ==
- Jared Thomas, author, academic and museum curator
