= District Council of Kanyaka =

District Council of Kanyaka South Australia
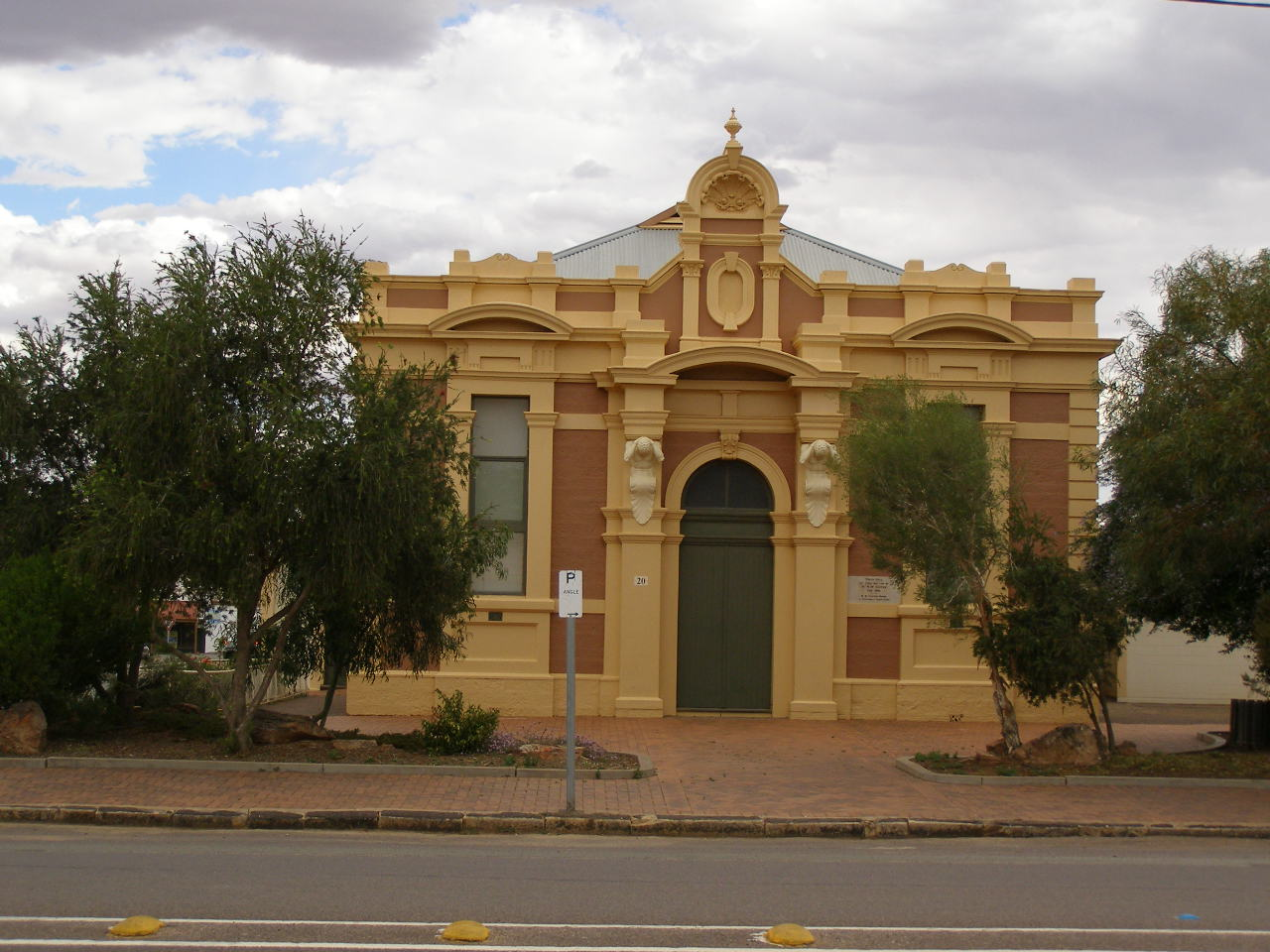
- Quorn Town Hall was shared by Quorn and Kanyaka councils

- Coordinates: 32°10′S 138°10′E
- Established: 1888
- Abolished: 1969
- Council seat: Quorn
LGAs around District Council of Kanyaka:
| | Hawker | Hawker |
| Davenport/ Woolundunga | District Council of Kanyaka | Eurelia/ Carrieton |
| Davenport/ Woolundunga | Wilmington/ Hammond | Eurelia/ Carrieton |

The District Council of Kanyaka was a local government area in South Australia that existed from 1888 to 1969.

== History ==
The council was established on 5 January 1888 under the provisions of the District Councils Act 1887. On creation, the council comprised the hundreds of Boolcunda, Cudlamudla, Kanyaka, Moockra and Palmer, and parts of the hundreds of Pichi Richi, Yarrah and Wyacca, east of the Middle Range and Dutchman's Range ridge line, which together make up the eastern two thirds of the County of Newcastle. The council area thus extended north and east from Pichi Richi Pass (about 10 km (6.2 mi) southwest of Quorn) to a point about 10 km (6.2 mi) due south of Hawker.

The council was initially based out of the Quorn Town Hall, but later was housed in an office converted from a house in Eighth Street, Quorn. Both buildings were actually not in the council area, being instead within the Corporate Town of Quorn which was an enclave surrounded by Kanyaka council from 1888. Both the town hall and later office survive as of 2015; the latter building has reverted to residential use.

On 16 February 1933, the council gained a section of the abolished District Council of Woolundunga, which became the new Mundallio Ward. By 1936, the council had seven wards (Pichi Richi, Suburban, Palmer, Boolcunda, Kanyaka, Mundallio and Yarrah), was reported to have a population of approximately 1,000, and was said to be one of the northernmost councils in South Australia.

It merged with the Corporate Town of Quorn on 1 April 1969 to form the District Council of Kanyaka-Quorn.

== Chairmen ==
- C. Meincke (1888)
- W. H. Neal (1902-1904)
- G. H. Willis (1904-1905)
- David William Stanley Stokes (1932-1937)
- Francis William Hannan (1937-1942)
- David William Stanley Stokes (1942-1946)
- Francis William Hannan (1946-1947)
- James Francis Reid (1947-1956)
- Paul Oscar Eckert (1956-1958)
- Oliver McHugh (1958-1963)
- John Denton French (1963-1969)
