= Winninowie =

Winninowie may refer to:

- Winninowie, South Australia, a locality south of Port Augusta
- Winninowie Conservation Park, on the coast in the locality of Miranda, south of Winninowie
- Hundred of Winninowie, a cadastral division that includes Miranda and Nectar Brook
