= Appila, South Australia =

Appila
- Town
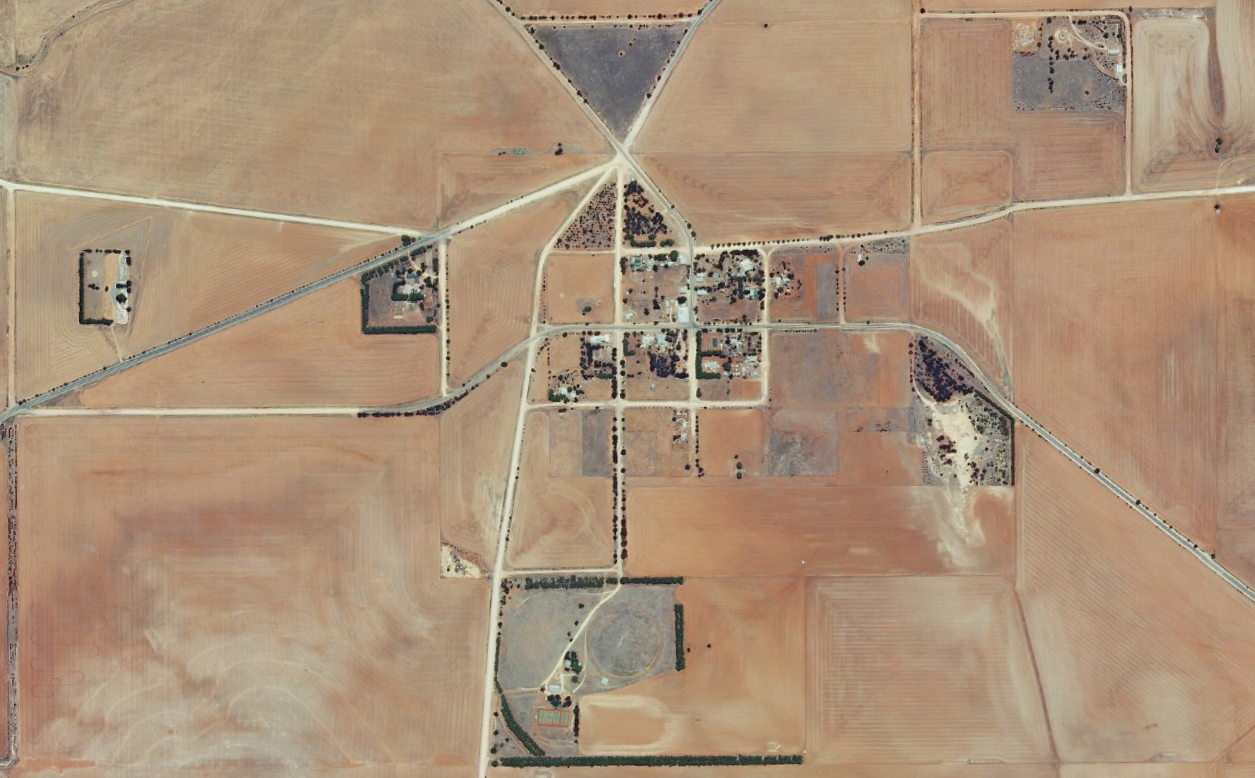
- Aerial view of Appila, 2015

- Coordinates: 33°3′2″S 138°25′41″E
- Country: Australia
- State: South Australia
- LGA: Mount Remarkable
- Location: 239 km (149 mi) N of Adelaide; 26 km (16 mi) E of Port Pirie
- Established: 1874

Government
  - State electorate: Stuart
  - Federal division: Grey

Population
  - Total: 91 (SAL 2021)
- Postcode: 5480
Localities around Appila
Murray Town	Booleroo Centre	Tarcowie
Wirrabara	Appila	Yongala
Stone Hut, Laura	Caltowie	Jamestown

Appila (earlier known as Yarrowie) is a locality in the Mid North of South Australia east of the lower Flinders Ranges. It occupies much of the eastern half of the Hundred of Appila and a strip on the western side of the adjacent Hundred of Tarcowie.

== History ==
The town of Yarrowie (an Aboriginal word for hunting ground) was established in 1872 following the proclamation of the Strangways Land Act for closer settlement in 1869. The town grew quickly as settlers moved to the area, and by the 1880s it had two hotels, four blacksmiths, three carpenters, Protestant, Catholic and government schools, a post office and telegraph station as well as other stores. In 1877 the name was changed to Appila-Yarrowie then later to just Appila to remove confusion with other towns including Yarcowie, Tarcowie, Terowie, Caltowie and Willowie.

When the Lutheran school was closed by the state government in 1918, it had 33 students.

== See also ==
- List of cities and towns in South Australia
