= Hundred of Booleroo =

Booleroo
- Cadastral division
- Coordinates: 32.878°S 138.343°E
- Country: Australia
- State: South Australia
- Region: Mid North
- LGA: Mount Remarkable
- Established: 17 June 1875

Area
  - Total: 280 km^{2} (108 sq mi)
- County: Frome
Lands administrative divisions around Booleroo
Gregory	Willowie	Coomooroo
Wongyarra	Booleroo	Pekina
Appila	Appila	Tarcowie

The Hundred of Booleroo is a cadastral hundred of the County of Frome in South Australia, centred on the eponymous township of Booleroo Centre. It was proclaimed by Governor Anthony Musgrave in 1875 and named for an indigenous term bulyeroo or bulyaroo, thought to mean "plenty" or "soft mud and clay".

The hundred stretches about 8 km (5.0 mi) north and east from the township of Booleroo Centre, about 10 km (6.2 mi) west and 7 km (4.3 mi) south.

== Local government ==
The District Council of Port Germein established in 1888 brought local government to the Hundred of Booleroo several neighbouring hundreds to the west. In 1980, the hundred became a part of the District Council of Mount Remarkable, which was formed by amalgamation of Wilmington and Port Germein councils.
