= Hundred of Davenport =

- Cadastral division
- Coordinates: 32°31′19″S 137°51′36″E
- Country: Australia
- State: South Australia
- Region: Far North
- LGA(s): Port August City Council
- Established: 23 February 1860

Area
  - Total: 320 km^{2} (125 sq mi)
- County: Frome
- Hundred: Davenport
Lands administrative divisions around Hundred of Davenport
Copley	Crozier	Pichi Richi
Copley; Spencer Gulf	Davenport	Woolundunga
Spencer Gulf	Winninowie	Winninowie

The Hundred of Davenport is a cadastral hundred within the County of Frome in South Australia, proclaimed in 1860.

Within its bounds are the rural city of Port Augusta, the township of Stirling North and the localities of Davenport, Winninowie, Port Paterson, Mundallio and Wami Kata on the east coast of the head of the Spencer Gulf.

== Local government ==
In November 1875 the Corporate Town of Port Augusta was established on the east bank of the head of Spencer Gulf. Less than two years later, the Corporate Town of Davenport was established in August 1887. Local government for the remainder of the hundred was established in January of the following year by the promulgation of the District Councils Act 1887 which established the District Council of Davenport (later called Woolundunga to distinguish it from the corporate town). In February 1933 Davenport municipality was annexed by the larger Port Augusta town council along with part of Woolundunga (and Port Augusta West in the westerly adjacent Hundred of Copley), bringing the entire hundred and extensive surrounds under the local governance of a single body now known as the City of Port Augusta.
