= County of Frome =

Frome
- Cadastral division
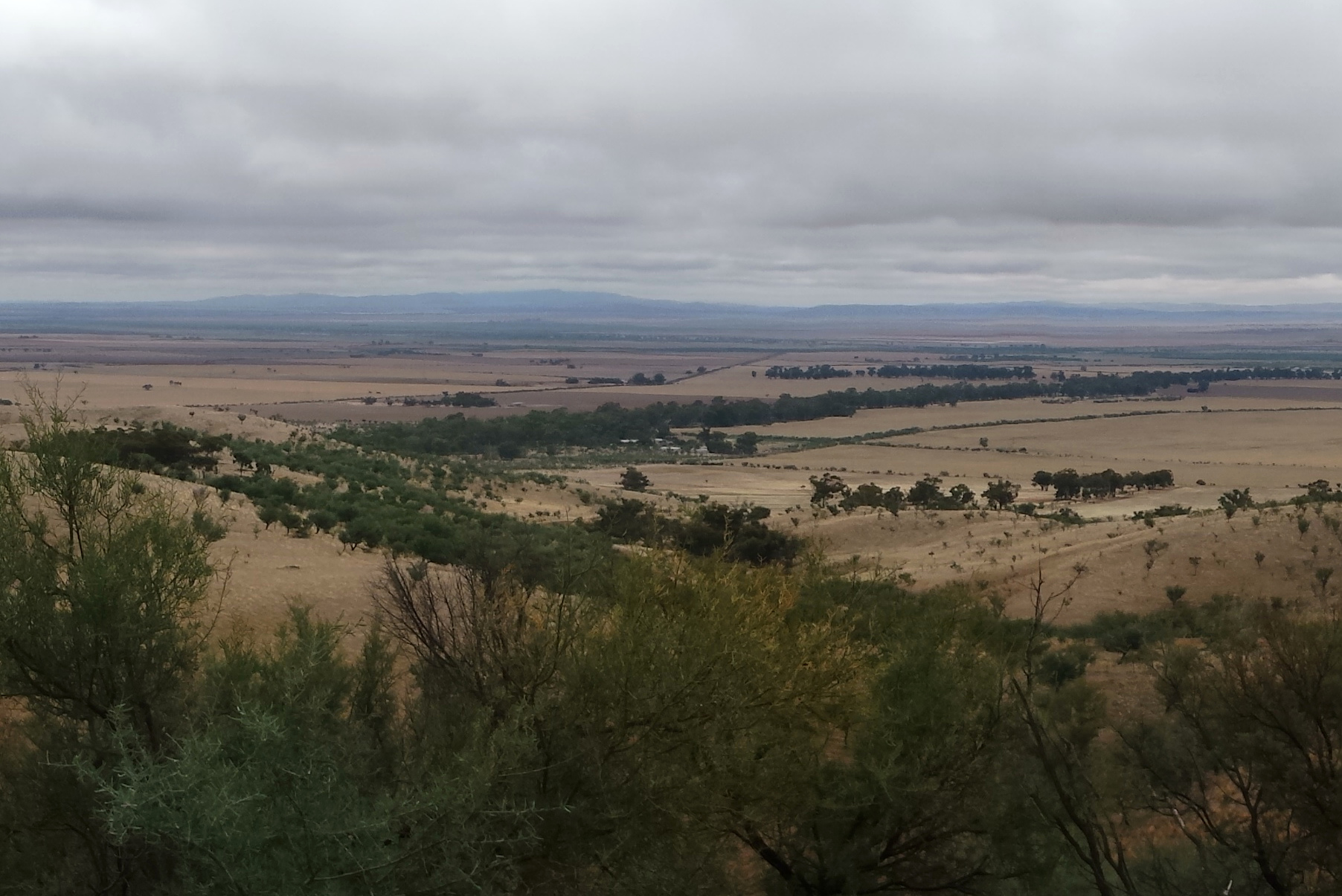
- Willochra Plain from the northern foothills of Mount Remarkable in the Hundred of Gregory

- Coordinates: 32.739°S 138.168°E
- Country: Australia
- State: South Australia
- LGA(s): City of Port Augusta; District Council of Mount Remarkable; Flinders Ranges Council
- Established: 1851

Area
  - Total: 3,910 km^{2} (1,508 sq mi)
Lands administrative divisions around Frome
Manchester	Newcastle	Granville
Manchester	Frome	Dalhousie
York	Victoria	Victoria

The County of Frome is one of the 49 cadastral counties of South Australia in straddling the Mid North and Flinders Ranges regions. It was proclaimed in 1851 by Governor Henry Young and was named for the former Surveyor-General of South Australia, Edward Charles Frome. The iconic Mount Remarkable in the Hundred of Gregory is at the centre of the county.

== Local government ==
The earliest local government to be formed in the county was the Corporate Town of Port Augusta, established at Port Augusta in 1875. The adjacent Corporate Town of Davenport was established at Davenport in 1887. The District Council of Davenport was established shortly after in 1888 at Stirling North, under the provisions of the District Councils Act 1887, but was renamed Woolundunga in 1893 to avoid confusion with the adjacent corporate town. The District Council of Wilmington and District Council of Port Germein were established at Wilmington and Port Germein, respectively, by the same 1887 legislation.

In 1932, the Corporated Town of Davenport was annexed by Port Augusta. Wilmington had been renamed Hammond in 1893 but the name was restored when it absorbed much of the abolished Woolundunga in 1933. That same year, the northerly-adjacent District Council of Kanyaka, also established in 1888, occupied a small north portion of the county when it annexed part of the former Woolundunga council area in the hundreds of Woolundunga and Willochra.

In 1964 Port Augusta obtained city status and became known as the City of Port Augusta.

In 1969 Kanyaka council amalgamated with the Corporate Town of Quorn to form the new District Council of Kanyaka-Quorn. This portion of the county was transferred to the Flinders Ranges Council in 1997 when Kanyaka-Quorn was abolished bt amalgamation with the District Council of Hawker.

In 1980, Port Germein and Wilmington amalgamated to form the present District Council of Mount Remarkable which presently spans almost all of the county, with the exception of the industrial centre of Port Augusta which has remained continuously viable beside coast in the north west corner of the county.

== Hundreds ==
The county is divided into the following hundreds from north west to south west:

- Hundred of Davenport, established in 1860 beside the Spencer Gulf spanning the city bounds of Port Augusta
- Hundred of Woolundunga, established in 1875 spanning Mount Brown Conservation Park and includes the locality of Saltia
- Hundred of Willochra, established in 1875 spanning the eponymous Willochra Plain and town of Wilmington
- Hundred of Coonatto, established in 1876 includes the hamlet of Hammond
- Hundred of Pinda, established in 1876 includes the locality of Amyton
- Hundred of Winninowie, established in 1878 beside the Spencer Gulf spanning Winninowie Conservation Park, the north west of Mount Remarkable National Park and the localities of Miranda and Nectar Brook
- Hundred of Gregory, established in 1858 spanning the north east of Mount Remarkable National Park
- Hundred of Willowie, established in 1875 includes the eponymous locality of Willowie
- Hundred of Baroota, established in 1878 beside the Spencer Gulf spanning the south west Mount Remarkable National Park and the localities of Mambray Creek and Baroota
- Hundred of Wongyarra, established in 1851 spanning the towns of Murray Town and Melrose at the southern foot of Mount Remarkable
- Hundred of Booleroo, established in 1875, centred on the eponymous township and locality of Booleroo Centre
- Hundred of Telowie, established in 1874 beside the Spencer Gulf spanning the town of Port Germein and the eponymous Telowie Gorge
- Hundred of Darling, established in 1891 spanning the northern half of the former Wirrabara Forest Reserve on the eastern slopes of the southern Flinders Ranges
- Hundred of Appila, established in 1871 spanning the towns of Wirrabara and Appila
