= District Council of Woolundunga =

District Council of Woolundunga South Australia
- Coordinates: 32°31′06″S 137°50′18″E
- Established: 1888
- Abolished: 1933
- Council seat: Stirling North
LGAs around District Council of Woolundunga:
Davenport	Quorn; Kanyaka	Kanyaka
Port Augusta	District Council of Woolundunga	Wilmington/Hammond
Port Augusta	Port Germein	Wilmington/Hammond; Port Germein

The District Council of Woolundunga was a local government area in South Australia from 1888 until 1933.

== History ==
It was created on 5 January 1888 as the District Council of Davenport under the provisions of the District Councils Act 1887, but was renamed Woolundunga on 8 June 1893 to avoid confusion with the adjacent Corporate Town of Davenport, a separate municipality. The principal township was Stirling North. The council constructed purpose-built chambers at Stirling North in 1894, and operated out of them for the remainder of their existence.

At its creation, the council area was more than 1,000 km^{2} (400 sq mi), including all the formerly unincorporated parts of the County of Newcastle west of the Dutchmans Range and Middle Range ridge line (Kanyaka council west border) as well as the Hundred of Winninowie and parts of the hundreds of Davenport and Woolundunga remaining unincorporated in the County of Frome. By 1923, the council controlled an area of approximately 212,000 acres in 1923, with 32 miles of main roads. It had an estimated 472 persons in 200 dwellings, with the capital value of ratable property in that year being £142,280. In the ten years prior, the area had transitioned "almost entirely" from wheat to sheep farming. It was reported to have retained a similar population in 1936. On 28 April 1932, part of Woolundunga, along with the Corporate Town of Davenport and the Corporate Town of Port Augusta West, merged into the existing Corporate Town of Port Augusta. Most of the remaining sections of the municipality merged with the District Council of Hammond and part of the District Council of Port Germein as the recreated District Council of Wilmington on 16 February 1933; a section of Woolundunga was also merged into the District Council of Kanyaka as its Mundallio Ward.

== Chairmen ==
- W. G. Pryor (1911–1916)
- W. Drennan (1916–1918)
- F. H. Lehmann (1918–1921)
- J. H. Prosser (1921–1922)
- F. H. Lehmann (1922–1923)
