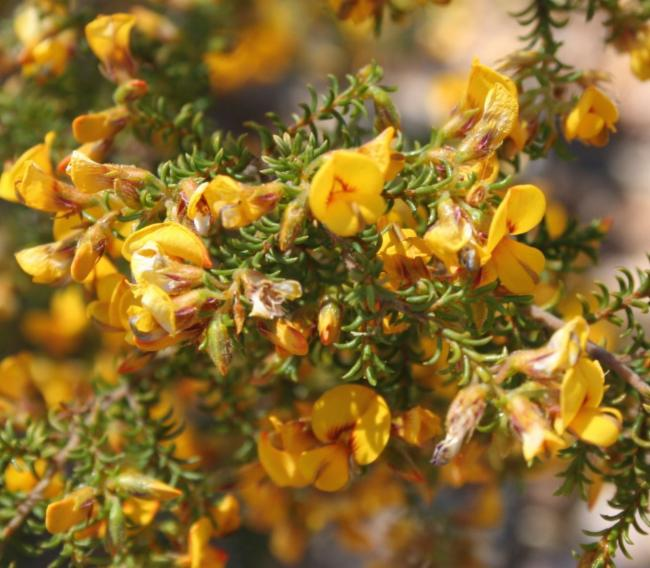
- Pultenaea graveolens near the summit of Mount Remarkable

Scientific classification
- Kingdom: Plantae
- Clade: Tracheophytes
- Clade: Angiosperms
- Clade: Eudicots
- Clade: Rosids
- Order: Fabales
- Family: Fabaceae
- Subfamily: Faboideae
- Genus: Pultenaea
- Species: P. graveolens

Binomial name
- Pultenaea graveolens Tate

= Pultenaea graveolens =

Scented bush-pea

Species of flowering plant

Pultenaea graveolens, commonly known as scented bush-pea, is a species of flowering plant in the family Fabaceae and is endemic to Victoria, Australia. It is a strongly scented shrub with hairy stems, egg-shaped leaves with boat-shaped stipules at the base, and flowers that are mostly yellow.

== Description ==
Pultenaea graveolens is a resinous, strongly perfumed shrub that typically grows to a height of up to 1.5 m (4 ft 11 in) and has hairy stems. The leaves are arranged alternately, egg-shaped, 4–25 mm (0.16–0.98 in) long and 0.5–3 mm (0.020–0.118 in) wide with boat-shaped stipules about 1 mm (0.039 in) long at the base. The flowers are arranged in leaf axils near the ends of short side branches with waxy, hairy yellow sepals 3–6 mm (0.12–0.24 in) long. There are egg-shaped bracteoles 1–3.5 mm (0.039–0.138 in) long at the base of the sepal tube. The standard petal is yellow, 7–9 mm (0.28–0.35 in) long and the ovary is densely hairy. Flowering occurs in October and the fruit is a hairy egg-shaped pod.

== Taxonomy and naming ==
Pultenaea graveolens was first formally described in 1885 by Ralph Tate in Transactions, proceedings and report, Royal Society of South Australia from specimens he collected near Uraidla in the Mount Lofty Range. The specific epithet (graveolens) means "strongly-smelling".

== Distribution and habitat ==
Scented bush-pea grows in the understorey of forests and occurs in scattered populations north of Melbourne including in the northern Grampians and Brisbane Ranges National Park.

== Conservation status ==
This pultenaea is listed as "vulnerable" under the Victorian Government Flora and Fauna Guarantee Act 1988.
