= Amyton, South Australia =

Amyton South Australia
- Coordinates: 32°36′39″S 138°19′40″E
- Population: 9 (SAL 2021)
- Established: 10 April 1879 (town); 13 March 1997 (locality)
- Abolished: 13 June 1957 (town)
- Postcode(s): 5431
- Time zone: ACST (UTC+9:30)
  - Summer (DST): ACST (UTC+10:30)
- Location: 259 km (161 mi) N of Adelaide; 28 km (17 mi) NE of Melrose
- LGA(s): Mount Remarkable
- Region: Yorke and Mid North
- County: Frome
- State electorate(s): Stuart
- Federal division(s): Grey
| Mean max temp | Mean min temp | Annual rainfall |
| 24.7 °C; 76 °F | 13.6 °C; 56 °F | 257.0 mm 10.1 in |
Suburbs around Amyton:
| Hammond | Hammond | Hammond |
| Wilmington | Amyton | Coomooroo |
| Wilmington | Willowie | Morchard |
- Footnotes: Location; Adjoining localities

Amyton is a locality in the Australian state of South Australia located on the eastern side of the Flinders Ranges about 259 kilometres (161 mi) north of the state capital of Adelaide and about 28 kilometres (17 mi) north-east of the municipal seat of Melrose.

Boundaries for the locality were created on 13 March 1997 and was given the “long established name” of Amyton which is derived from the former Government Town of Amyton.

The government town was intended to be the principal settlement of the cadastral unit of the Hundred of Pinda. It was surveyed in January 1879 and laid out as “204 house allotments and 180 larger blocks and parklands.” It was proclaimed on 10 April 1879 and was named after the eldest daughter of William Jervois, the Governor of South Australia. It was diminished on 13 May 1954 by the cancellation of the loan registration book for the land intended for “school purposes” and resumption of all of the land intended for the school, parklands and the town, and was proclaimed to ‘cease to exist’ on 13 June 1957.

The town had as many as “four buildings and many temporary constructions” at one time and had a school in operation from 1881 to 1930. As of 2012, “nothing remains but a small pioneer cemetery” and “a few rubble heaps…” Geoffrey Manning, the South Australian historian, notes that the town was not successful because the “uncertainty of the rainfall” made the growing of wheat unviable, although farmers of the time could practise dairying as the “good variety of summer fodders, such as saltbush and blue bush” realized better financial returns than growing wheat.

Amyton is located within the federal division of Grey, the state electoral district of Stuart and the local government area of the District Council of Mount Remarkable.
