= Winninowie, South Australia =

Winninowie South Australia
- Coordinates: 32.61°S 137.91°E
- Population: 5 (SAL 2021)
- Postcode(s): 5700
- Location: 21 km (13 mi) southeast of Port Augusta
- LGA(s): City of Port Augusta; District Council of Mount Remarkable
- Region: Far North; Yorke and Mid North
- County: Frome
- State electorate(s): Stuart
- Federal division(s): Grey
Localities around Winninowie:
Spencer Gulf	Port Paterson; Woolundunga	Woolundunga
Spencer Gulf	Winninowie	Woolundunga; Nectar Brook
Spencer Gulf	Miranda	Nectar Brook
- Footnotes: Adjoining localities

Winninowie is a locality in the Mid North of South Australia. It is traversed by the Augusta Highway which is part of the Australian National Highway on Highway 1. It includes the intersection of Horrocks Pass Road, also known as Main North Road with the main highway. Winninowie is 21 kilometres (13 mi) southeast of Port Augusta, on the plain between Spencer Gulf on the west and the southern Flinders Ranges on the east.

The locality of Winninowie spans the boundary between the local government areas of the City of Port Augusta (which includes the Augusta Highway and Adelaide-Port Augusta railway line), and the District Council of Mount Remarkable. A railway siding at Winninowie opened with the line in 1936; a crossing loop remains there today. Winninowie Post Office opened on 1 September 1880 and closed on 31 May 1928.

The boundaries for the locality were first created in 1994 for the long established local name; initially, they only comprised the section within the City of Port Augusta, with the Mount Remarkable section being added in 1997. The name was derived from the Hundred of Winninowie, which in turn stemmed from a word of Aboriginal origin. However, the modern Winninowie locality lies entirely within the Hundred of Davenport, with its eponymous hundred lying directly to its south.

== See also ==
- List of cities and towns in South Australia
