= Saltia, South Australia =

Saltia South Australia
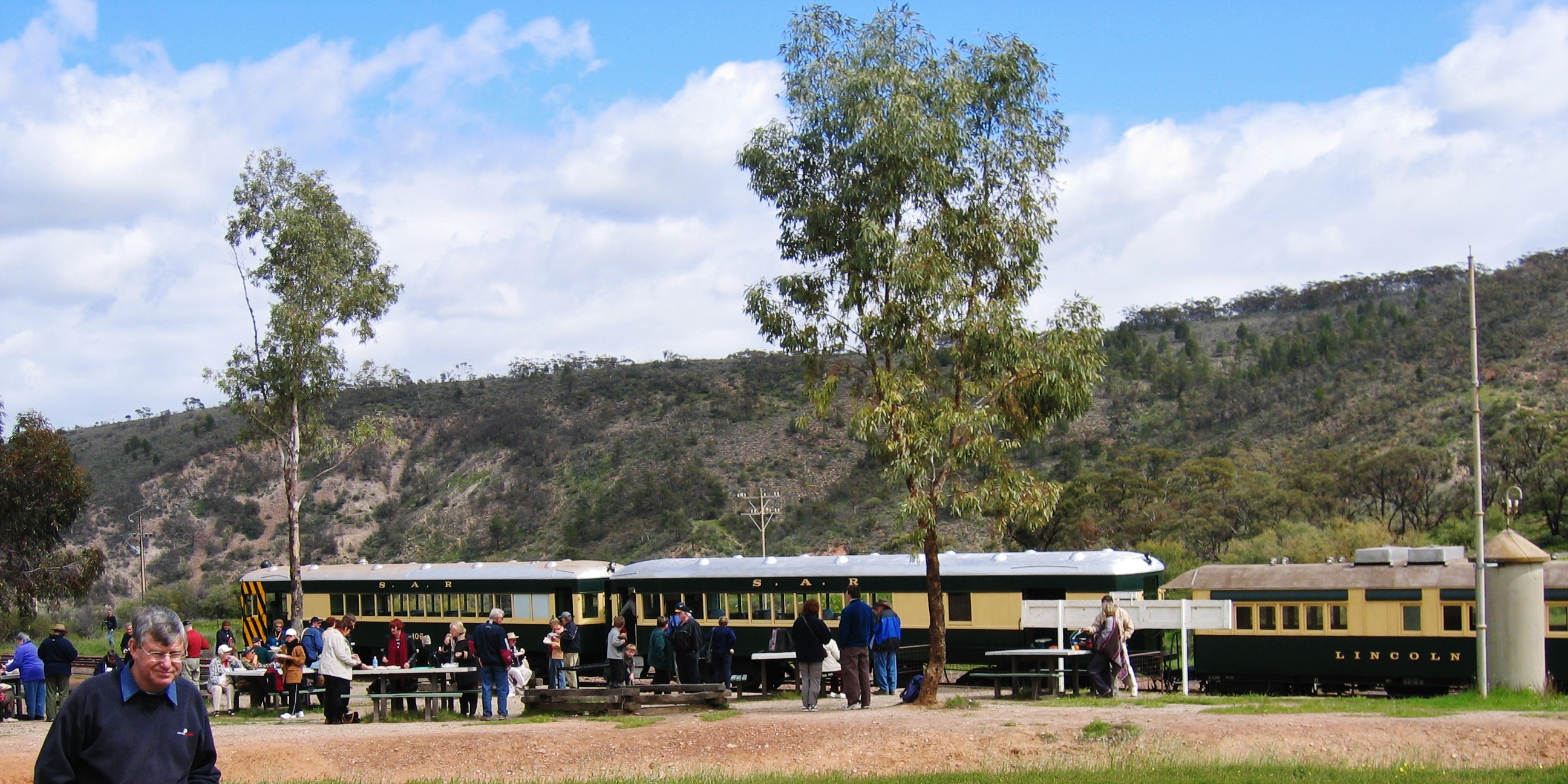
- Pichi Richi Railway carriages stopped at Saltia before entering the Pichi Richi Pass
- Coordinates: 32°28′27″S 137°55′57″E
- Population: 21 (SAL 2021)
- Established: 1862 (sub-division); 13 December 1984 (place); 17 February 1994 (locality)
- Postcode(s): 5433
- Elevation: 183 m (600 ft)(railway station)
- Time zone: ACST (UTC+9:30)
  - Summer (DST): ACST (UTC+10:30)
- Location: 279 km (173 mi) N of Adelaide; 19 km (12 mi) E of Port Augusta
- LGA(s): City of Port Augusta; District Council of Mount Remarkable; Flinders Ranges Council
- Region: Far North; Yorke and Mid North
- County: Frome
- State electorate(s): Giles; Stuart
- Federal division(s): Grey
Mean max temp	Mean min temp	Annual rainfall
24.7 °C; 76 °F	13.6 °C; 56 °F	257.0 mm 10.1 in
Localities around Saltia:
Emeroo	Emeroo	Quorn
Mundallio; Stirling North	Saltia	Wilmington
Stirling North	Woolundunga	Woolundunga
- Footnotes: Locations; Adjoining localities

Saltia is a locality in the Australian state of South Australia located on the western side of the Flinders Ranges about 279 kilometres (173 mi) north of the state capital of Adelaide and about 19 kilometres (12 mi) east of the city of Port Augusta.

Saltia began as a private sub-division associated with Sections 901 and 902 of the cadastral unit of the Hundred of Woolundunga in 1862. The developer was Charles Simmons who purchased the land prior to 1859 followed by the erection of a hotel in the same year and the layout of the "town" in 1862. The name is derived from an Aboriginal word thaltja meaning "the gums" and spelt as thaltia in 1855. A post office was opened around 1869. It was declared as a place name on 13 December 1984. Boundaries for the part of the locality within the City of Port Augusta in the west were proclaimed on 17 February 1994 while the part within the District Council of Mount Remarkable in the south-east was added on 13 March 1997.

The road known as Flinders Ranges Way and the Pichi Richi Railway both pass through the locality in a west–east direction from Port Augusta towards Quorn.

At the 2016 census, Saltia had a population of 10 people.

Saltia is located within the federal division of Grey, the state electoral districts of Giles and Stuart and the local government areas of the City of Port Augusta, the District Council of Mount Remarkable and the Flinders Ranges Council.
