= Mambray Creek, South Australia =

Mambray Creek South Australia
- Coordinates: 32°49′55″S 137°58′47″E
- Population: 26 (SAL 2021)
- Postcode(s): 5495
- Time zone: ACST (UTC+9:30)
  - Summer (DST): ACST (UTC+10:30)
- Location: 240 km (149 mi) north of Adelaide; 40 km (25 mi) north of Port Pirie
- LGA(s): District Council of Mount Remarkable
- Region: Yorke and Mid North
- County: Frome
- State electorate(s): Stuart
- Federal division(s): Grey
Mean max temp	Mean min temp	Annual rainfall
24.7 °C; 76 °F	13.6 °C; 56 °F	257.0 mm 10.1 in
Suburbs around Mambray Creek:
Miranda	Miranda; Nectar Brook	Nectar Brook
Spencer Gulf	Mambray Creek	Nectar Brook; Wilmington
Spencer Gulf	Baroota	Wilmington
- Footnotes: Locations; Adjoining localities

Mambray Creek is a locality in the Australian state of South Australia located on the east coast of the Spencer Gulf about 240 kilometres (150 mi) north of the state capital of Adelaide and about 40 kilometres (25 mi) north of the city of Port Pirie.

A post office which was located within section 68 in the cadastral unit of the Hundred of Winninowie opened in 1879 with the name ‘Old Baroota’ which was changed to 'Mambray Creek' in 1880, then to 'Mount Gullet' in 1924 and back to 'Mambray Creek' in 1939. A school of the same name operated from 1939 to 1972. Name and boundaries for the locality were assigned on 13 March 1997.

Mambray Creek’s name is reported as having two possible sources. Firstly, Rodney Cockburn, author of Nomenclature of South Australia, suggested that the name is a derivation of ‘Mamre’ which was the name of a house near Angaston built by a William Salter. Salter’s son, also named William, acquired the ‘Old Baroota’ pastoral lease which is associated with the locality and which includes a creek named `Membre'. Secondly, Norman Tindale, the anthropologist, advised that a word ‘mambiri’ used by local aboriginals for the 'native cherry' (Exocarpos cupressiformis) is the “more likely derivation.”

The locality occupies land extending from the coastline with Spencer Gulf in the west to the western side of the Flinders Ranges in the east and a portion extending to the north on the east side of both the Augusta Highway and Adelaide-Port Augusta railway line.

Land use within the locality is divided between agriculture and conservation with the latter being associated the coastline in the west, and land in the locality’s east having specific requirements for the protection of its landscape or being part of the protected area known as the Mount Remarkable National Park.

Mambray Creek, a fresh stream, passes through the locality from its source in the Flinders Ranges in the east to its mouth at Spencer Gulf in the west.

Mambray Creek is located within the federal division of Grey, the state electoral district of Stuart and the local government area of the District Council of Mount Remarkable.

== See also ==
- 5AU
