= District Council of Port Germein =

Coordinates: 32°49′S 138°11′E

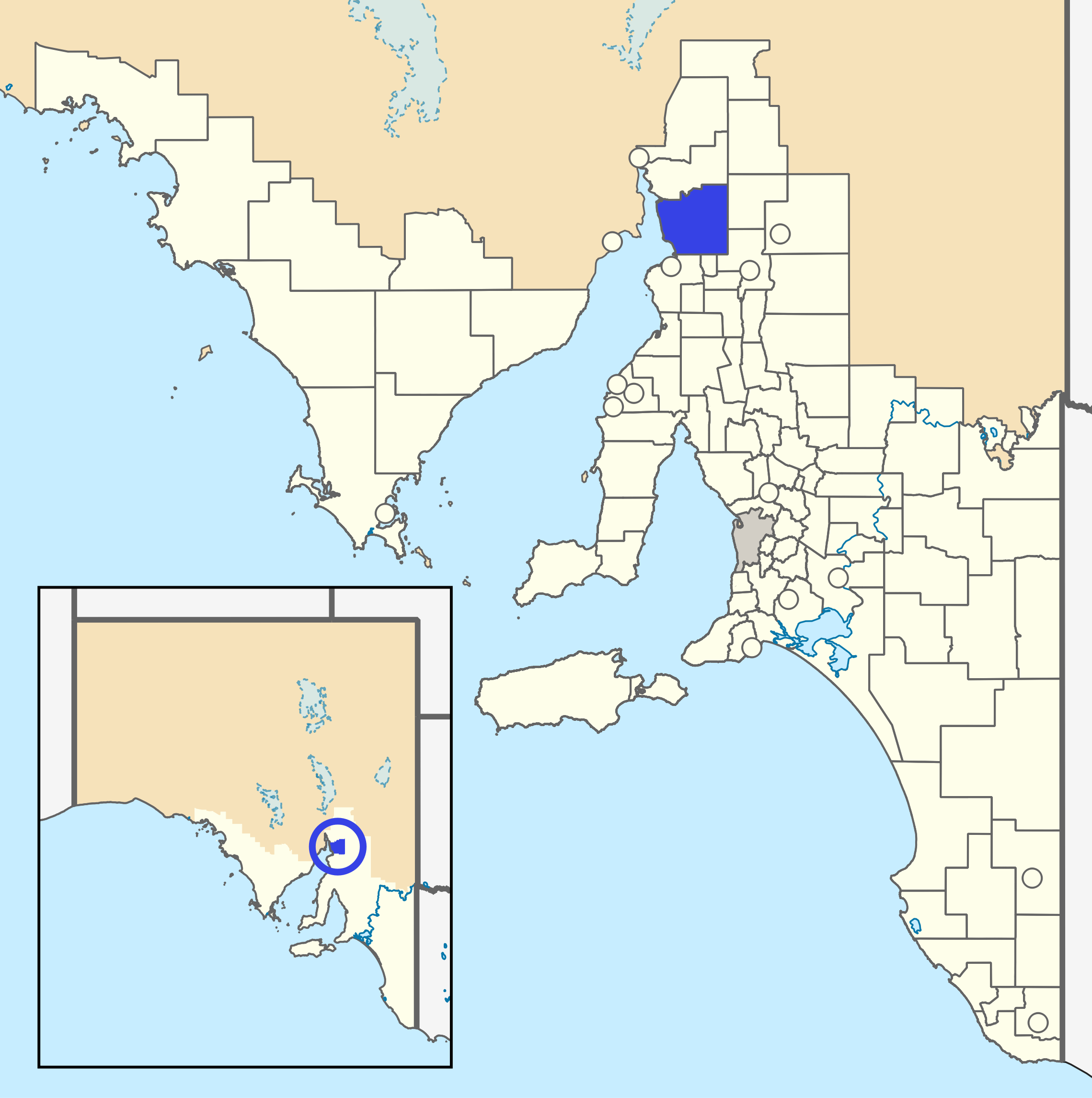
The District Council of Port Germein as it was prior to disestablishment (blue)

The District Council of Port Germein was a local government area in South Australia, centred on the town of Port Germein. It was gazetted on 5 January 1888 under the provisions of the District Councils Act 1887 and encompassed the hundreds of Baroota, Wongyarra, Booleroo, Telowie, Darling and Appila. It replaced an abortive earlier municipality, the Corporate Town of Port Germein, which had been established on 15 September 1887 when residents, concerned about increased taxation and their interests being lost in a broader shire under the forthcoming reforms, decided to incorporate the town. The local residents reportedly regretted the decision, and when the Act passed late in the year creating the new District Council, state parliament agreed to amalgamate the Corporate Town into the new municipality.

A section of the municipality separated on 16 February 1933, when it was merged with the District Council of Hammond and most of the District Council of Woolundunga as the recreated District Council of Wilmington. In 1936, the Official Civic Record of South Australia described Port Germein council as "one of the largest in South Australia", covering a reported area of 517,760 acres. It had a population estimated at 5,343, with 1,200 ratepayers. In 1954, it reportedly had a population of 3,371. In 1980, it merged with the District Council of Wilmington to form the District Council of Mount Remarkable.

== Chairmen ==
- S. Challinger (1911)
- J. Arthur (1915)
- Wallace Pengilly Foulis (1935–1937)
- Herman Carl Jaeschke (1937–1939)
- Thomas Sydney Bishop (1939–1941)
- Stanley George Stone (1941–1942)
- Nigel Stuart Giles (1942–1944)
- Walter Leonard Arthur (1944–1947)
- Hiram John Dickson (1947–1950)
- Charles Owen Geddes (1950–1955/1956)
- John Melrose Hillam (1955/1956–1958)
- William James Stanbrook Holman (1958–1960)
- Edwin Carl Roocke (1960–1962)
- Wilhelm Edward Koch (1962–1964)
- Walter Bishop (1964–1966)
- Clem Winchester Fuller (1966–1969)
- Ian Robert Heaslip (1969–1971)
- Desmond Timothy Meaney (1971–1973)
- Alfred Vivian Cornelius (1973–1975)
- Leith Edward Borgas (1975–1977)
- Elliott Edgar Smart (1977–1979)
- Noel William Schmidt (1979–1980)
