= Wirrabara, South Australia =

Wirrabara
- Town
- Coordinates: 33°02′09″S 138°16′09″E
- Country: Australia
- State: South Australia
- LGA: District Council of Mount Remarkable
- Established: 13 August 1874 (town); 13 March 1997 (locality)

Government
  - State electorate: Electoral district of Stuart
  - Federal division: Division of Grey
- Elevation: 329 m (1,079 ft)

Population
  - Totals: 230 (urban centre) (2016 census); 403 (state suburb) (2016 census)
- Postcode: 5481
Localities around Wirrabara
Bangor	Wongyarra	Booleroo Centre
Telowie	Wirrabara	Appila
Beetaloo Valley, Nelshaby	Stone Hut	Caltowie West

Wirrabara is a town and a locality in South Australia, about 235 kilometres (146 mi) north of Adelaide. It is located in the Southern Flinders Ranges in the Mid North of South Australia, along the Rocky River. The Horrocks Highway (Main North Road) passes through the town. At the 2016 census, the locality had a population of 403 of which 230 lived in its town centre.

== History ==
The name Wirrabara derives from a corruption of two words from the Kaurna language of the "Adelaide tribe", wirra (gum trees) and birra (running water); in the Nukunu language of the local Nukunu people, wira and parl means gum trees with honey and water.

A timber milling industry was established in Wirrabara during the early 1850s. The town was surveyed in 1874. In 1877 the first government forest nursery in Australia was planted in the nearby Wirrabara forest.

The Wilmington railway line was extended north from Gladstone and Laura through Wirrabara and Booleroo Centre to Wilmington in the 1910s after the locals had been pleading with the government to build it for many years.

The historic Copper Mine Chimney, Wirrabara on Main North Road, a remnant of the former Charlton mine, is listed on the South Australian Heritage Register.

== Description ==
According to Peter Goers, the town's name is pronounced "Rabra" by locals.

The town still has a timber industry and a farming community. There is a producers' market on the third Sunday of the month, and nearby is an example of silo art by the artist Smug (aka Sam Bates).

== See also ==
- Wirrabara Range Conservation Park
