= Hundred of Pichi Richi =

Pichi Richi
- Cadastral division
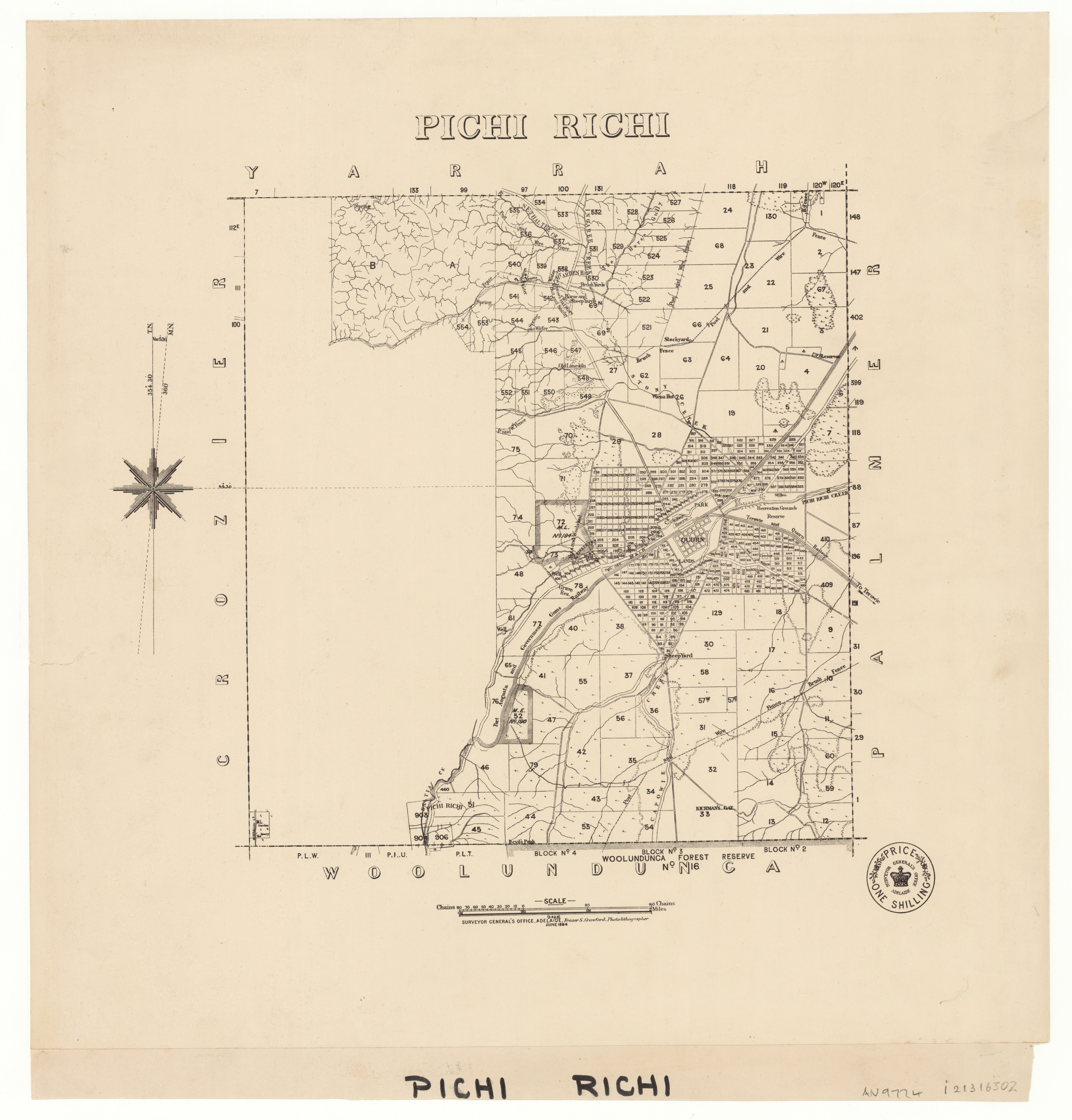
- Plan of the Hundred in 1884

- Coordinates: 32°20′37″S 138°00′05″E
- Country: Australia
- State: South Australia
- Region: Far North
- LGA(s): Flinders Ranges Council; Pastoral Unincorporated Area

Area
  - Total: 240 km^{2} (94 sq mi)
- County: Newcastle
Lands administrative divisions around Pichi Richi
	Yarrah	Boolcunda
Crozier	Pichi Richi	Palmer
Davenport	Woolundunga	Willochra

The Hundred of Pichi Richi is a cadastral hundred of the County of Newcastle in South Australia, and 293 m (961 ft) above sea level. It spans the eastern slopes of Dutchman Range and is centred on the township of Quorn.

The traditional owners of the area are the Ngadjuri people. The first European explorer to the area was Thomas Burr in September 1842.

== See also ==
- Pichi Richi Railway
