= Hundred of Yarra =

Coordinates: 32.195°S 138.215°E

The Hundred of Yarra is a cadastral hundred of the County of Newcastle in South Australia.

The traditional owners of the area are the Ngadjuri people. The first European explorer to the area was Thomas Burr in September 1842.
