= Baroota, South Australia =

Baroota
- Suburb
- Coordinates: 32°55′36″S 137°58′50″E
- Country: Australia
- State: South Australia
- Region: Yorke and Mid North
- LGA: District Council of Mount Remarkable
- Location: 230 km (140 mi) north of Adelaide city centre; 29 km (18 mi) northeast of Port Pirie
- Established: 13 March 1997

Government
  - State electorate: Stuart
  - Federal division: Grey

Population
  - Total: 52 (SAL 2021)
- Time zone: UTC+9:30 (ACST)
  - Summer (DST): UTC+10:30 (ACST)
- Postcode: 5495
- County: Frome
- Mean max temp: 24.7 °C (76.5 °F)
- Mean min temp: 13.6 °C (56.5 °F)
- Annual rainfall: 257.0 mm (10.12 in)
Suburbs around Baroota
Spencer Gulf	Mambray Creek; Wilmington	Melrose
Spencer Gulf	Baroota	Melrose; Bangor
Spencer Gulf	Port Germein	Port Germein
- Locations; Adjoining localities

Baroota is a locality in the Australian state of South Australia located on the east coast of Spencer Gulf about 230 kilometres (140 miles) north of the state capital of Adelaide and about 29 kilometres (18 mi) north-east of the city of Port Pirie.

Baroota originally started as a private sub-division in the cadastral unit of the Hundred of Baroota. Its boundaries were created for the “long established name” on 13 March 1997. Its name is reported as being derived from “an early pastoral lease which derived the name either from the local Aboriginal tribe or a corruption of the Aboriginal word "nilbaroota" meaning reedy place for animals or animal food.”

The locality occupies land extending from the coastline with Spencer Gulf in the west to the western side of the Flinders Ranges in the east. The Augusta Highway and Adelaide-Port Augusta railway line both pass through the locality in a north–south direction. The southern end of the Black Range section of the Mount Remarkable National Park extends into the locality from the north-east. The Baroota Reservoir is located on the Baroota Creek in the east of the locality.

The land use within the locality is divided between agriculture and conservation of land associated with both the coastline in the west and the water catchment for the Baroota Reservoir in the locality's east.

The 2016 Australian census which was conducted in August 2016 reports that Telowie had a population of 95 people.

Baroota is located within the federal division of Grey, the state electoral district of Stuart and the local government area of the District Council of Mount Remarkable.

== See also ==
- Daniel Cudmore (businessman)
