= Hundred of Darling =

The Hundred of Darling, is a Hundred in the County of Frome, proclaimed on 29 January 1891 and named after John Darling snr, MP, MLC. It is located at Latitude: -33.045551300 Longitude: 138.171081542. The topography is mountainous and heavy forested. The main geographic feature is Telowie Gorge.

== See also ==
- Telowie Gorge Conservation Park
- Wirrabara, South Australia
