= Booleroo Centre =

- Town
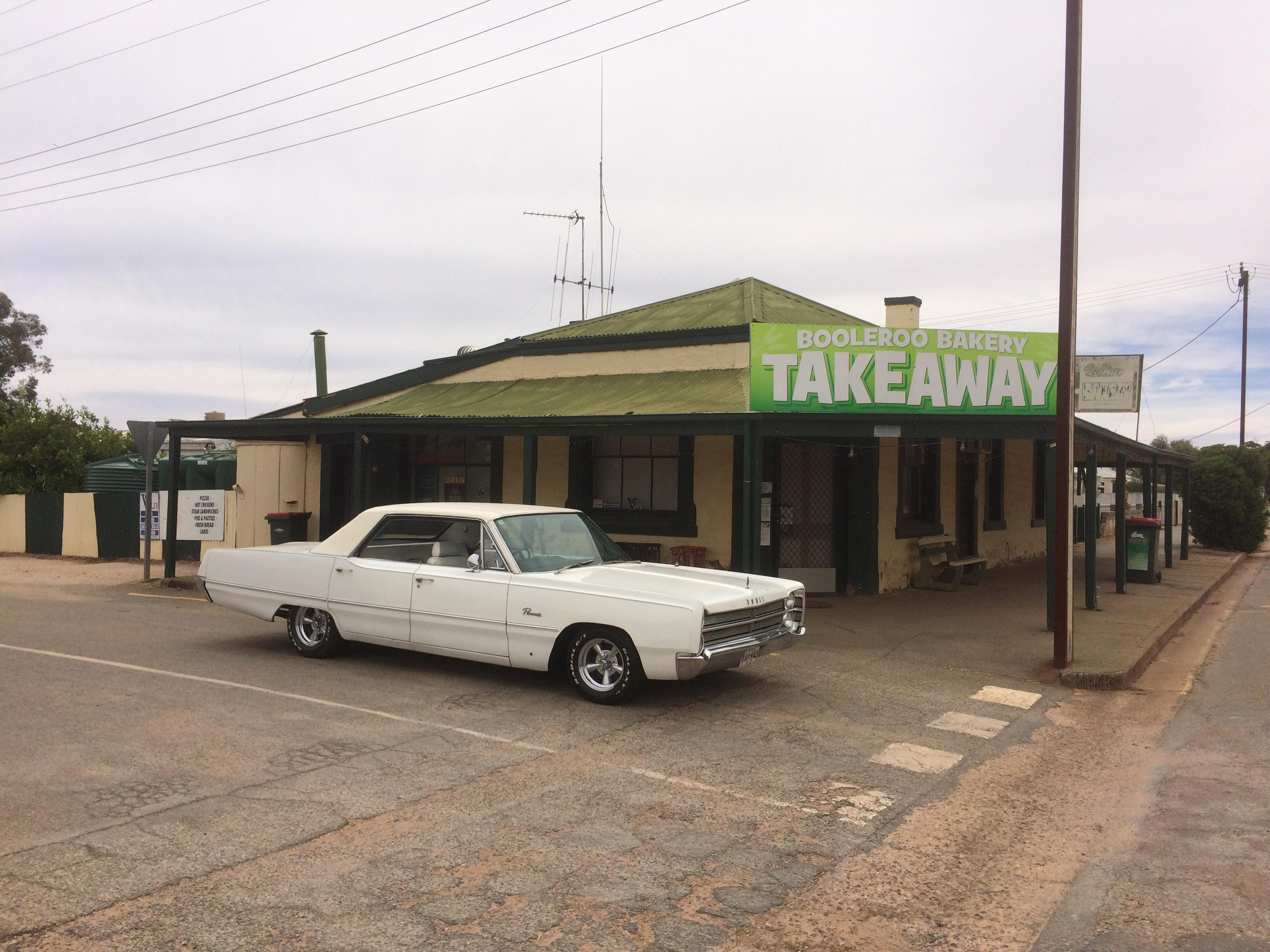
- Booleroo Bakery at the corner of Staion Street and Stephens Street

- Coordinates: 32°52′51″S 138°21′2″E
- Country: Australia
- State: South Australia
- LGA: District Council of Mount Remarkable
- Location: 282 km (175 mi) N of Adelaide; 66 km (41 mi) NE of Port Pirie; 56 km (35 mi) W of Peterborough

Government
  - State electorate: Stuart
  - Federal division: Grey

Population
  - Total: 266 (UCL 2021)
- Postcode: 5482
Localities around Booleroo Centre
Wilmington	Willowie	Morchard
Melrose	Booleroo Centre	Pekina
Murray Town; Wongyarra	Wirrabara; Appila	Tarcowie

Booleroo Centre is a town in the southern Flinders Ranges region of South Australia. The town is located in the Mount Remarkable District Council local government area, 282 kilometres (175 mi) north of the state capital, Adelaide. At the 2006 census, Booleroo Centre had a population of 516.

== History ==
In 1853 a pastoral lease was taken out by partners William Spence Peter and George Elder who then pioneered a sheep station which they named the Booleroo run. The name was derived from a local Aboriginal word. Sources vary on its meaning with suggestions including "plenty" or "soft mud". In 1856 W.S. Peter, who also owned Gum Creek Station near Hallett, became a brother in law to George Charles Hawker of Bungaree and Anama Stations. George Elder was a brother of Alex Elder, founder of Elders Limited. On 28 February 1861 the Booleroo run was profitably auctioned when W.S. Peter decided to settle in the Canterbury region of New Zealand as a stud sheep breeder. The purchaser was former Londoner Philip Levi, whose pastoralism interests eventually included Moolooloo, North-West Bend, Gum Creek, Mount Margaret, among others.

Land reforms of the 1870s saw many pastoral leases resumed by the government in order to subdivide the land for closer farming settlement, the Booleroo run being among them. The pastoralists were to be replaced by grain farming agriculturalists.

The Hundred of Booleroo was officially proclaimed in 1875 however no town was surveyed at this time. A town site in the hundred was surveyed by the colonial government in 1878, but the early settlers established the town elsewhere. The town's location at the centre of the Hundred of Booleroo led to the name Booleroo Centre.

The historic Booleroo Whim well on the Willowie-Booleroo Road is listed on the South Australian Heritage Register.

== Media ==
Booleroo Centre was home to two separate, but short-lived publications:

- Booleroo Times (1 February 1912 – 24 July 1913) – published at the Crystal Brook Times.
- Booleroo Magnet (24 March 1914 – 27 April 1915) – published by W.H. Bennett. In April 1915, the title was briefly extended to The Booleroo Magnet and Wirrabara and Melrose Advocate.

== Present day ==
The major industry in Booleroo Centre today is grain production with wool and lamb production also important. The town is also the service centre to the surrounding agricultural district. Facilities in the town include a range of shops and Uniting, Catholic and Lutheran churches. Booleroo Centre is also host to large grain receival facilities and fertiliser depots. The Booleroo Centre Hotel, the local pub, was established in 1883.

Regional services offered in Booleroo Centre include the Booleroo Centre District Hospital, part of the Mid North Regional Health Service, providing health services to the town and a large catchment area with a population of 3,000. The Booleroo Centre District School enrolled 225 students from kindergarten to Year 12 in 2007. The school draws students from surrounding towns such as Wirrabara, Melrose and Wilmington. Homeschooling also plays a role within the community, with several local students being educated in this way during recent years.

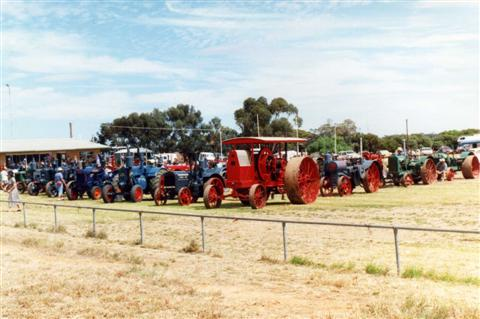
Booleroo Steam & Traction event day

Booleroo Centre is home to the Booleroo Steam & Traction Preservation Society Museum. The society, developed from an annual rally first held in 1969, now maintains one of Australia's largest collections of tractors and steam engines along with farm and other steam equipment requiring over 2,900 square yards (2,425 m^{2}) of undercover storage space. The rally is held at the town oval the last Sunday in March.

== Transport ==
Booleroo Centre was serviced by the Wilmington railway line from 1910 until 1969. In 1884 the portion of railway between Gladstone and Laura was opened, but did not reach to Booleroo Centre. Coaches took travellers to the railhead. Agitation went on for many years until, in 1910, the first railway to Booleroo Centre was opened by the South Australian Railways. The new 3 ft 6 in (1,067 mm) (narrow) gauge line ran 24.25 miles (39 kilometres) between Laura and Booleroo Centre. The line was extended to Wilmington in 1915. The railway greatly facilitated the shipment of locally produced bagged wheat through Gladstone to export ports such as Port Pirie. In 1910 there were 100,000 bags of wheat stacked at Booleroo. It also provided valuable passenger services for many decades, until improvements in road transport began to replace rail, resulting in ceasing passenger service in 1969 and eventual closure in 1982.

== Notable people ==
- Bob Schulz (1923–2008), fashion designer
- Vern Schuppan (1943–), motor racing driver, 1983 24 Hours of Le Mans winner
