= Woolundunga Station =

Pastoral lease in South Australia

Coordinates: 32.535°S 137.943°E

Location in South Australia

Woolundunga Station is a pastoral lease that operates as a sheep station in South Australia.

It is situated approximately 20 kilometres (12 mi) north west of Wilmington and 23 kilometres (14 mi) south west of Quorn at the foot of the Flinders Ranges.

The leasehold has existed since 1859. The station was put up for auction in 1863 and sold to Charles Swinden. At that time it occupied an area of 128 square miles (330 km^{2}) and was stocked with approximately 15,000 sheep, 500 cattle and 24 horses.

Walter Kingsmill acquired the property in the 1860s. He also owned Mount Brown, Mount Serle and Mount Chambers Stations.

By 1922 the station was in a terrible state, nearly devoid of vegetation, as a result of drought, overstocking and the effects of rabbits.

A new two-storey homestead was built on the Station in 1950, a replica of one built in about 1892.

In late 1950, scenes for the film Kangaroo were shot on Woolundunga, and the Station was temporarily renamed as Rooloora for American audiences of the film.

In 2012 the entire area was ravaged by fire, killing 600 sheep and burning out 3,000 acres (1,214 ha).

== See also ==
- List of ranches and stations
