= Hundred of Palmer =

Cadastral division in South Australia

- Cadastral division
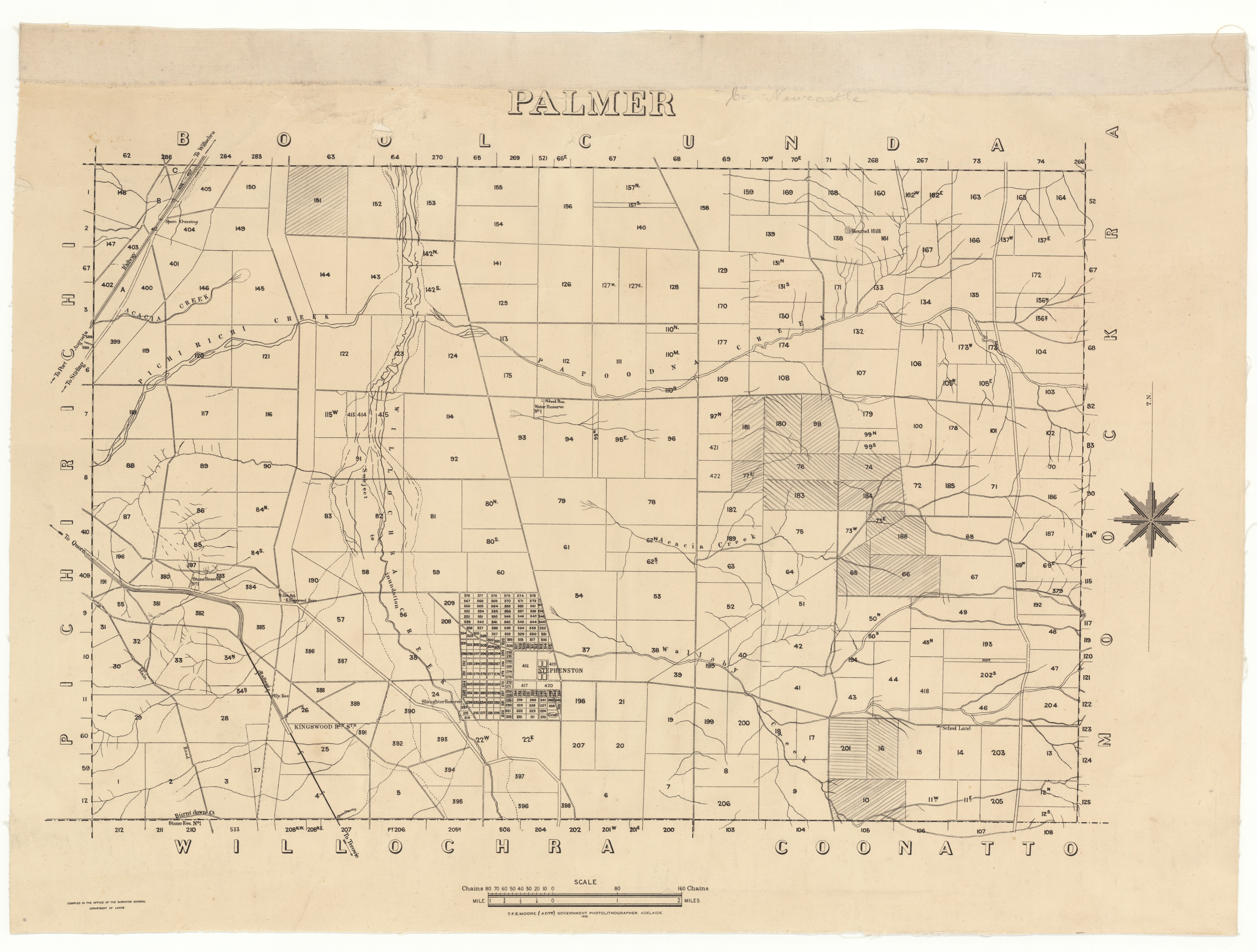
- Cadastral map of Hundred of Palmer, 1938

- Interactive map of Hundred of Palmer
- Coordinates: 32.35°S 138.21°E
- Country: Australia
- State: South Australia
- Location: 18 km (11 mi) east of Quorn
- Established: 1873
Lands administrative divisions around Hundred of Palmer
Hundred of Yarrah	Hundred of Boolcunda
Hundred of Pichi Richi	Hundred of Palmer	Hundred of Moockra
Hundred of Woolundunga	Hundred of Willochra	Hundred of Coonatto

The Hundred of Palmer is a cadastral hundred of the County of Newcastle in South Australia. It is located near 32.35°S, 138.21°E east of the township of Quorn, and south of the former town of Willochra which, although surveyed in 1860, never properly developed and was abandoned during the drought in the 1860s.

The traditional owners of the area are the Ngadjuri people. The first European explorer to the area was Thomas Burr in September 1842.
