= Hundred of Woolundunga =

Woolundunga
- Cadastral division
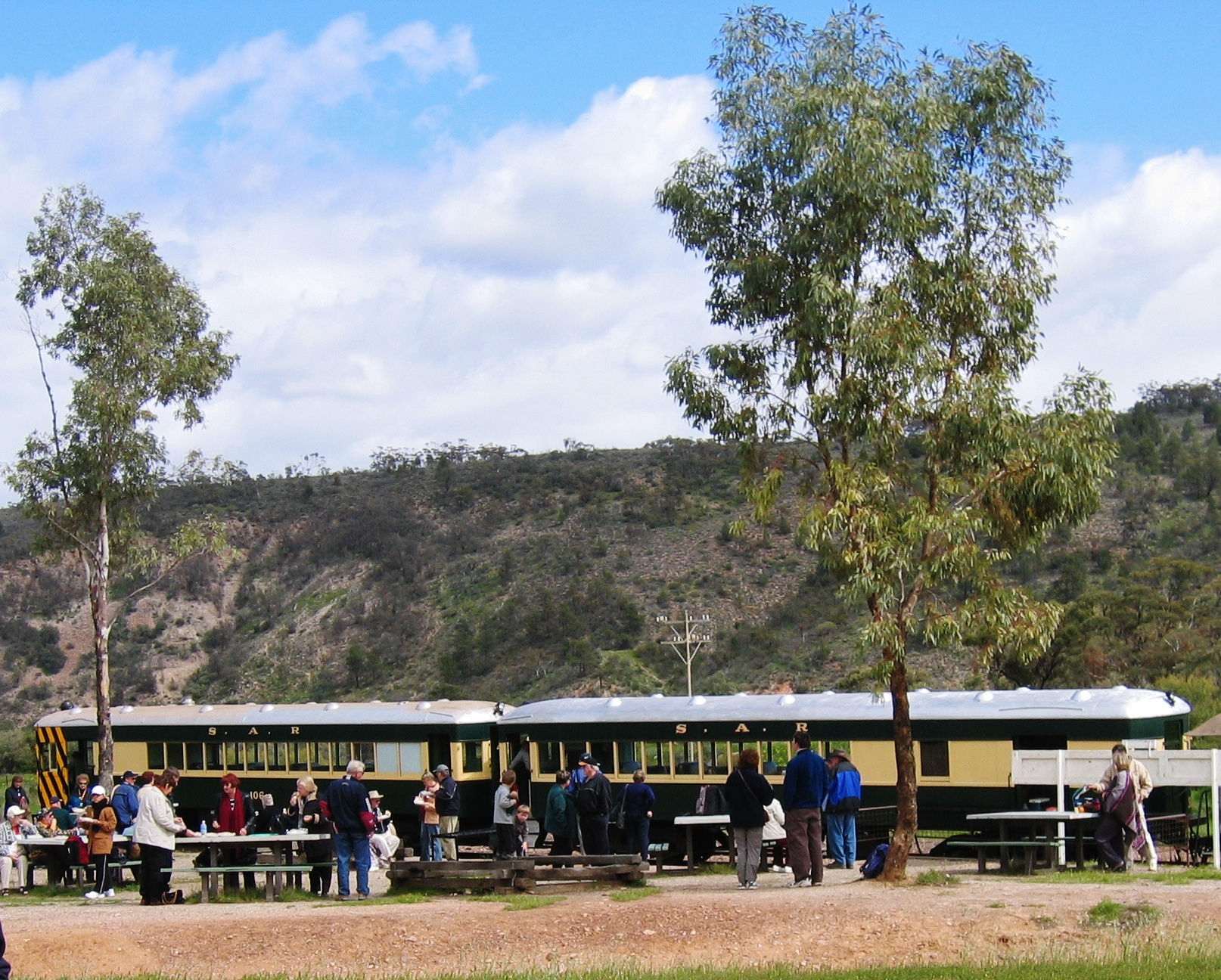
- Pichi Richi Railway carriages at Saltia in the northwest of the hundred

- Coordinates: 32.53°S 138.01°E
- Country: Australia
- State: South Australia
- Established: 8 July 1875

Area
  - Total: 410 km^{2} (157 sq mi)
- County: Frome
Lands administrative divisions around Woolundunga
Crozier	Pichi Richi	Palmer
Davenport	Woolundunga	Willochra
Winninowie	Winninowie	Gregory

The Hundred of Woolundunga is a cadastral unit of hundred in South Australia spanning Mount Brown Conservation Park and including the localities of Woolundunga and Saltia. It is one of the 14 hundreds of the County of Frome close to the northeast coast of Spencer Gulf.

== See also ==
- Lands administrative divisions of South Australia
