= Woolundunga, South Australia =

Woolundunga
- Suburb
- Coordinates: 32°33′55″S 137°57′00″E
- Country: Australia
- State: South Australia
- Region: Far North; Yorke and Mid North
- LGAs: Port Augusta; Mount Remarkable
- Location: 270 km (170 mi) N of Adelaide; 21 km (13 mi) SE of Port Augusta
- Established: 17 February 1994 (locality)

Government
  - State electorate: Stuart
  - Federal division: Grey

Population
  - Total: 30 (SAL 2021)
- Time zone: UTC+9:30 (ACST)
  - Summer (DST): UTC+10:30 (ACST)
- Postcode: 5701
- County: Frome
- Mean max temp: 24.7 °C (76.5 °F)
- Mean min temp: 13.6 °C (56.5 °F)
- Annual rainfall: 257.0 mm (10.12 in)
Suburbs around Woolundunga
Stirling North; Port Paterson	Saltia	Wilmington
Port Paterson	Woolundunga	Wilmington
Winninowie	Winninowie; Nectar Brook	Wilmington
- Location; Adjoining localities

Woolundunga is a locality in the Australian state of South Australia located on the western side of the Flinders Ranges about 271 kilometres (168 mi) north of the state capital of Adelaide and about 21 kilometres (13 mi) south-east of the city of Port Augusta.

Boundaries for the part of Woolundunga within the City of Port Augusta in the west were proclaimed on 17 February 1994 while the part within the District Council of Mount Remarkable in the east was added on 13 March 1997.

The locality's name is of Aboriginal origin and is considered by the South Australian historian, Geoffrey Manning, to be derived from the name of “springs near Mount Brown” claimed to belong to a group of Aboriginal people with “the same name.” The name was used in 1851 for a pastoral enterprise called the ‘Woolundunga Run’ which was established by J. Pat(t)erson on pastoral lease no. 32 and which was located in part of the locality as shown by the presence of two homestead ruins both bearing the name within the current boundaries.

Woolundunga is bounded in part by roads including the Horrocks Pass Road (B56) which passes through the pass of the same name on its southern side and the Augusta Highway which forms its western boundary.

Land use within the locality is concerned with ‘primary industry’ activities dominated by pastoralism and other classes of agriculture with land in the locality's east being zoned to preserve “the natural and rural character and scenic features.”

Woolundunga is located within the federal division of Grey, the state electoral district of Stuart and the local government areas of the City of Port Augusta and the District Council of Mount Remarkable.
