= Hundred of Cudlamudla =

The Hundred of Cudlamudla is a cadastral hundred of the County of Newcastle in South Australia, that is located at 32.195°S 138.215°E in the Flinders Ranges. The traditional owners of the area are the Ngadjuri people. The first European explorer to the area was Thomas Burr in September 1842. The hundred now combines with the adjacent Hundred of Kanyaka to constitute the locality of Kanyaka.

The nearby town of Willochra was surveyed in 1860 but the town never properly developed and was abandoned during the drought in the 1860s.
