= District Council of Mount Remarkable =

Coordinates: 32°49′30″S 138°11′17″E

- Local government area
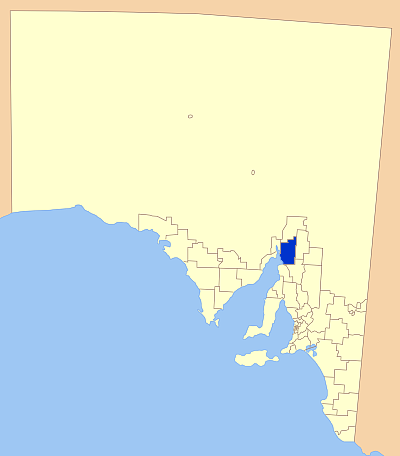
- Location of the District Council of Mount Remarkable

- Interactive map of District Council of Mount Remarkable
- Country: Australia
- State: South Australia
- Region: Yorke and Mid North
- Established: 1980
- Council seat: Melrose

Government
  - Mayor: Stephen McCarthy
  - State electorate: Stuart
  - Federal division: Grey

Area
  - Total: 3,424.5 km^{2} (1,322.2 sq mi)

Population
  - Total: 2,862 (LGA 2021)
- Website: District Council of Mount Remarkable
LGAs around District Council of Mount Remarkable
City of Port Augusta	Flinders Ranges Council	District Council of Orroroo Carrieton
	District Council of Mount Remarkable	District Council of Orroroo Carrieton
City of Whyalla	Port Pirie Regional Council	District Council of Northern Areas

The Mount Remarkable District Council is a local government area located between the top of the Spencer Gulf and the base of the Southern Flinders Ranges in South Australia. The district encompasses a wide variety of towns, including coastal ports and agricultural centres. The economy of the district council is largely based on agriculture.

== History ==
The Flinders Ranges region has been one of the first areas settled by pioneers, with the land being used mainly for extensive sheep grazing and sporadic mining. Most of the rural land is held under perpetual and pastoral leases.

The District Council of Mount Remarkable was formed when the District Council of Port Germein and District Council of Wilmington areas merged in 1980. The council is named after the nearby peak of Mount Remarkable, named by Edward John Eyre in 1840, in reference to the way it stood out against the surrounding landscape.

== Economy ==
Agriculture is the major facet of the economy, represented by a mixture of grazing, cropping, mixed farming, horticulture and forestry.

The region is rich in minerals and the potential value of new mining development is considerable and currently being explored.

Tourism also plays a part in the economy, with the coast and the Southern Flinders Ranges attracting tourists.

== Localities ==
The district includes the following localities – Amyton, Bangor, Baroota, Booleroo Centre, Hammond, Mambray Creek, Melrose, Murray Town, Nectar Brook, Port Germein, Telowie, Weeroona Island, Willowie, Wirrabara and Wongyarra, and part of Appila, Bruce, Coomooroo, Germein Bay, Moockra, Morchard, Saltia, Stone Hut, Wilmington, Winninowie and Woolundunga.

== Council ==
Ward	Councillor	Notes
Telowie	Stephen McCarthy	Mayor
Telowie	Sheridan Tate	
Telowie	Vacant	
Willochra	Ian Keller	
Willochra	Dan van Holst Pellekaan	
Willochra	Colin Nottle	
Willochra	Vacant	

== Chairmen and mayors of Mount Remarkable ==
- Noel William Schmidt (1980–1983)
- Eric Graham Hillam (1983-1984)
- Reginald Colin Zwar (1984-1985)
- Trevor Clarence Roocke (1983-2010)
- Sandra Wauchope (2010–2016)
- Colin Nottle (2016–2018)
- Phillip Heaslip (2018 to 2022)
- Stephen McCarthy (2022 to Present)
