= Willowie, South Australia =

Willowie
- Town
- Coordinates: 32°42′S 138°18′E
- Country: Australia
- State: South Australia
- LGA: District Council of Mount Remarkable
- Location: 22 km (14 mi) east of Wilmington
- Established: 1878

Government
  - State electorate: Stuart
  - Federal division: Grey

Population
  - Total: 35 (2016 census)
- Postcode: 5431
Localities around Willowie
	Amyton	Coomooroo
Wilmington	Willowie	Morchard
Melrose	Booleroo Centre	Pekina

Willowie is a locality and small town in the upper Mid North region of South Australia. It lies on the Wilmington–Ucolta Road midway between Wilmington and Orroroo. The town has declined, but once had Bible Christian (later Methodist then Uniting) and Lutheran churches and a hotel, as well as a general store, butcher, saddler and school. It still has a memorial hall opened in 1953. The hall has two stained glass windows which had originally been installed in the Methodist Church porch to commemorate those who died in service or were killed in action during World War One. They were installed at the hall in 2006 after the church closed.

The town was proclaimed in 1878 under closer settlement. The name had been used for the pastoral run established in the area in 1844. The name is believed to be derived from Aboriginal words "willa" meaning green trees and "owie" meaning water.
