= Murray Town, South Australia =

Murray Town South Australia
- Coordinates: 32°56′11″S 138°14′26″E
- Population: 58 (SAL 2021)
- Established: 1883
- Postcode(s): 5481
- Location: 253 km (157 mi) N of Adelaide; 81 km (50 mi) SE of Port Augusta
- LGA(s): Mount Remarkable
- State electorate(s): Stuart
- Federal division(s): Grey
Localities around Murray Town:
Melrose	Melrose; Booleroo Centre	Booleroo Centre
Melrose; Bangor	Murray Town	Booleroo Centre
Bangor	Wongyarra	Booleroo Centre
- Footnotes: Adjoining localities

Murray Town is a locality in the Mid North of South Australia east of the lower Flinders Ranges. It was settled in 1883 and served as a rest stop for bullock and horse teams carting grain towards Port Germein from further north and east.

The town was named for Alexander Murray, who introduced the Murray Merino sheep breed.

The annual spring Murray Town Auction no longer takes place. Ending in 2016, due to difficulties in getting volunteers. The hotel which is listed on maps has not been open for many many years.

== See also ==
- List of cities and towns in South Australia
