= Melrose, South Australia =

Melrose
- Town
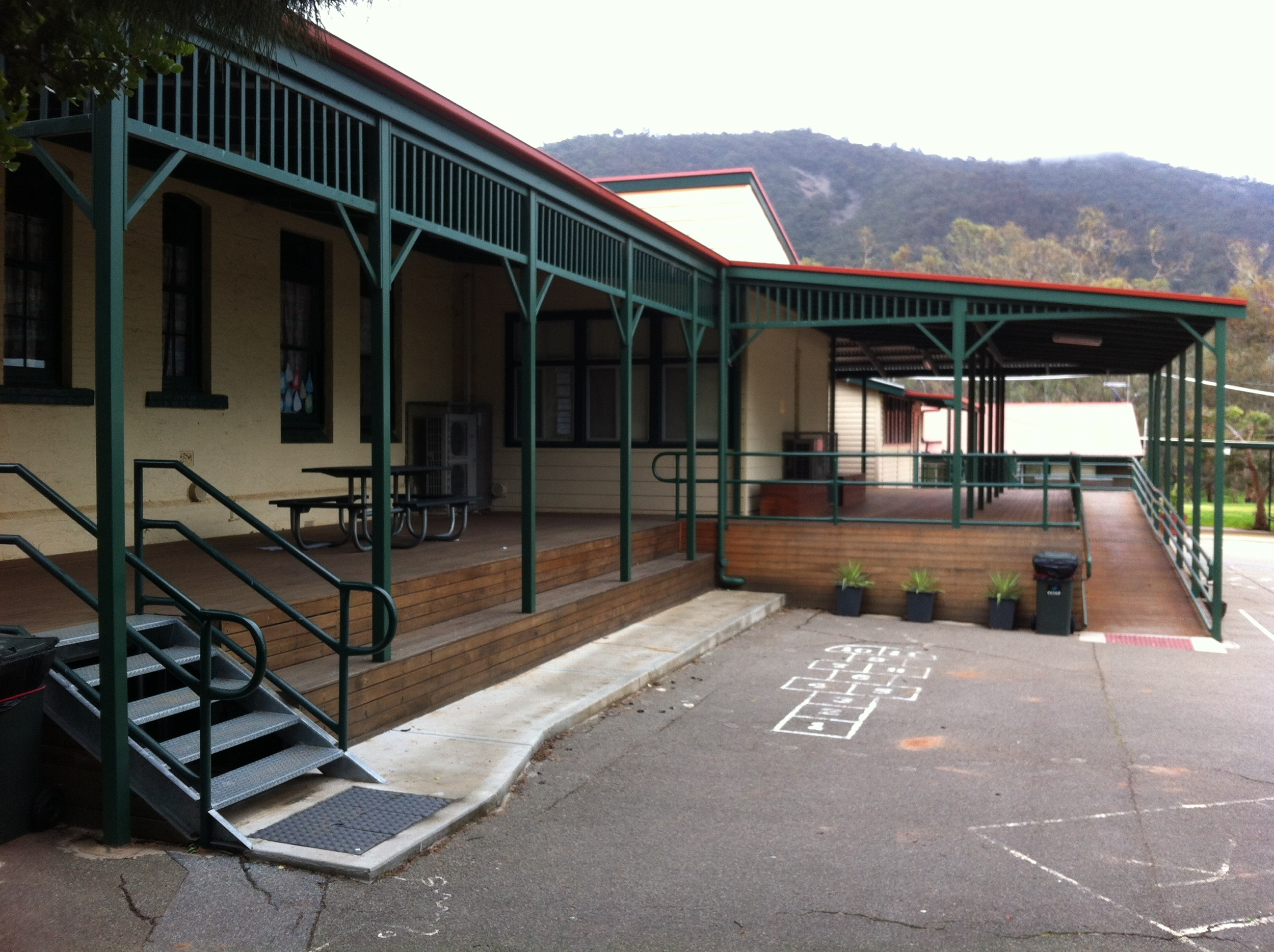
- Melrose Township with Mount Remarkable in background

- Coordinates: 32°49′S 138°11′E
- Country: Australia
- State: South Australia
- LGA: District Council of Mount Remarkable
- Location: 265 km (165 mi) N of Adelaide city centre; 65 km (40 mi) E of Port Augusta
- Established: 1840

Government
  - State electorate: Stuart
  - Federal division: Grey

Population
  - Total: 342 (SAL 2021)
- Postcode: 5483
- Annual rainfall: 550 mm (22 in)
- Website: Melrose
Localities around Melrose
Wilmington	Wilmington	Willowie
Wilmington; Baroota	Melrose	Booleroo Centre
Baroota	Bangor; Murray Town	Murray Town

Melrose is the oldest town in the Flinders Ranges, South Australia. The town was once named "Mount Remarkable".

The town is known for its proximity to Mount Remarkable and the surrounding National Park, its caravan park, and historical sites including Jacka's Brewery and Melrose Courthouse.

== History ==
Journalist Rodney Cockburn, in his popular book What's in a Name asserts that consensus has not yet been reached about the origins of Melrose's name. He gives the explanation that its surveyor named the town after George Melrose, of Rosebank, Mount Pleasant, who assisted him when he was ill. Another explanation suggests a land owner named Alexander Campbell settled in the area in 1844 with his family and named the region after his hometown, Melrose, in Scotland. Historian Geoff Manning found that the town was located on a property claimed by the Mount Remarkable Mining Company and in the 1850s subdivided it into 250 sections of 80 acres (32 ha). Townsites were surveyed at either end, Melrose to the north and Bangor at the southern end. This was in accord with Cockburn's findings, but Manning was convinced that A. L. Elder, a prominent director of the company and a proud Scotsman, named it for Melrose in Roxburghshire.

The first European explorer in the area was Edward John Eyre in 1840; pastoralists settled in the area about a decade later. Copper was discovered and mining started in 1846, but it was not economically viable, and ceased in 1851. The mine was opened again three more times, with the latest closure in 1917.

In 1893 at a time of high unemployment, Wilton Hack founded a communal settlement in the area. At its peak, some 130 settlers were working 1,000 acres (400 ha) of land. By the end of 1895 after a succession of poor seasons around half the settlers had left, and in 1896 the village was closed by the Government.

When it was opened in 1848, the police station in Melrose was not only the first permanent police station in the region, but the base of the largest police district in the world. A constable, two troopers and an Aboriginal tracker were responsible for an area extending to the Timor Sea.

The Wilmington railway line from Gladstone opened near Melrose in 1915 and closed in 1990. The station was almost 2 kilometres (1.2 mi) north of the town. Melrose is also on the Horrocks Highway, formerly known as Main North Road.

=== Heritage listings ===
Melrose has a number of heritage-listed sites, including:

- 3 Brewery Street: Keating Cottage
- Melrose to Orroroo Road: Mount Remarkable Woolshed
- Melrose to Orroroo Road: Mount Remarkable Station
- Mount Street: Jacka's Brewery and Yard Walls
- near Melrose: Rankine's Hut
- Lot 2 Spratt Street: Timber Slab Dwelling
- Stuart Street: Melrose Post Office
- Stuart Street: Melrose Courthouse and Police Station
- Stuart Street: Mount Remarkable Inn
- 22-24 Stuart Street: Blacksmith Shop and Dwelling
- 13 Whitby Street: Timber Slab Dwelling

==== Jacka's Brewery ====
Jacka's Brewery was a family business founded by Joseph Jacka in 1877 in Melrose. Several months prior, Joseph and his brother William had leased the land the brewery still resides upon from Joseph's father-in-law. At the time, the Jacka family also owned the North Star Hotel in Melrose, and were already experienced brewers as they had previously owned a brewery in Auburn.

In 1887 Joseph continued brewing in Melrose while his brother William relocated to Burra. Jacka's brewery was a great success and popular amongst the locals. Within the next decade or so, Joseph was able to buy more surrounding land and extend the breweries premises. At this point, Jacka's brewery was distributing beer to Port Pirie and Port Augusta using custom made wagons, wooden casks and teams of eight horses to traverse the Flinders Ranges. William returned to Jacka's Brewery in 1901 after his brother died, to assist his nephew William J.S. Jacka with running the business. The brewery ceased production in 1934 after World War I and the Great Depression rendered it economically inviable.

The brewery was formerly known as T.B. Marshall's Flour Mill.

==== Melrose Cemetery ====
Melrose Cemetery was established in the 1860s. According to the Virtual War Memorial for Australia, the opening of the cemetery is referenced by local newspapers. This includes the South Australian Register's account of a whooping cough epidemic creating several new graves mere months after the cemetery's opening in 1863. Almost a decade later, the South Australian Register again referred to Melrose Cemetery as being "new", as well as a "regular resort for pigs to go about rooting in", suggesting that the council take better care of the grounds.

== Indigenous population ==
=== Nukunu ===
As of 1974, there are records of the Ngaiawang Indigenous Tribe, also referred to as the Nukunu, being located east of Melrose and Mount Remarkable. The term 'Nukunu' may have been based on the term 'Nokunno' used by the Kaurna tribe, and may refer to a metaphorical assassin that hunts at night. Variations of the name include but are not limited to: Wongaidja, Nukuna, Nookoona, and Nuguna. Furthermore, according to Tiechelmann and Schürmann's 1840 account of the tribe, the Nukunu also practiced both subincision and circumcision as male initiation rites. Efforts are currently being made to revive the Nukunu language.

The presence and influence of the Nukunu people in Melrose is evident in place names. An example of this is the property of 'Bartagunyah', which, according to the Bartagunyah Estate website, means 'home of the Bardi Grubs'.

=== Adnyamathanha ===
Additionally, the Adnyamathanha people lived in the northern Flinders Ranges area for many millennia.

== Tourism and landmarks ==
Today, Melrose is the base for visitors to the Mount Remarkable National Park and a centre for the local farmers.

Melrose Tennis Club hosts a tennis tournament over the Easter weekend, with finals played on Monday morning. The tournament usually attracts around 200 participants across all the events.

In June, Melrose is home to the Fat Tyre Festival, an off-road bike celebration exploring local bike trails and crowding parades of freak bikes.

In August, Melrose is also home to the King of the Mount trail race. This is a race to the summit of Mt Remarkable, during which runners and walkers ascend over 600 metres (2,000 ft) along a 7.7 kilometres (4.8 mi) trail.

Melrose is home to a caravan park visited by 100,000 tourists every year.

The town also has several sites and associated activities that are popular tourist attractions throughout the year.

=== Paradise Square ===
Paradise Square was the first cemetery in Melrose, situated by the Melrose Heritage Centre. According to the Virtual War Memorial for Australia, almost 128 burials took place in Paradise Square until its closure in the 1850s and prior to the establishment of Melrose Cemetery. Several Paradise Square burials were eventually relocated to the new Melrose Cemetery.

In 1890 on Arbor Day, 70 trees were planted on the grounds previously occupied by Paradise Square. The trees were replaced by tennis courts in 1925, which were later removed. Today, gardens provide a tribute to the remaining residents of Paradise Square.

=== Bartagunyah Winery and Estate ===
Bartagunyah Estate and Winery is located approximately 5 km from Melrose. Its close proximity to the town means the winery is considered one of Melrose's tourist attractions. The land the estate sits upon was originally named by the Nukunu people, an Indigenous Australian community native to the Melrose region. The name translates to 'home of the bardy grubs'. The property itself was originally used for livestock in the 1930s, but in 1997 it was converted to a vineyard and winery. Tourists can participate in wine tasting and several ecotourism activities, including but not limited to mountain biking across ridge top trials, camping with a view of the Willochra Plain, and 4WD tours.

=== Old Emu Foot ===
Old Emu Foot has been identified by arborists at the National Register of Big Trees as the largest tree in South Australia, more so for its width than its height. It has also been identified as the largest river red gum (Eucalyptus camaldulensis) in Australia. Its size was compared with several contenders throughout NSW, Victoria and Western Australia using the American Forests formula.

The tree was nominated as the largest river red gum in Australia and largest tree in South Australia by the director of Arbortech, Kym Knight. Knight has estimated the tree's age to be around 400 years.

Old Emu Foot is not considered a tourist attraction as it is on private property and is not easily accessible for the general public. It sits approximately 1.2 km from the Melrose Showgrounds in a sheep paddock owned by farmer David McCallum.

It is 35 metres tall, its circumference is 14.82 metres, and its crown is 29 metres. These dimensions afford Old Emu Foot a score of 722 points according to the American Forests formula.

== Creek ==
On the West side of the Melrose Township, flows the Wilochra Creek heading Northwards. The creek is freshwater and is home to freshwater leeches, ducks, frogs and water insects. In some parts of the creek, depths can reach a maximum of two metres. Bike trails cross the creek several times and follow the creek adjacent to its course.

== Education ==
Melrose has several educational institutions, including but not limited to:

- Melrose primary school
- Melrose kindergarten
- Terka township
- Wilmington Primary School
- Wilmington Kindergarten
- Booleroo Centre District School
