= Mount Remarkable National Park =

National park in South Australia

- IUCN category VI (protected area with sustainable use of natural resources)
- Location within South Australia
- Location: South Australia
- Nearest city: Melrose; Port Germein; Port Pirie
- Coordinates: 32°46′53″S 138°03′46″E
- Established: 1 January 1952
- Visitors: 50,000 (in 2006)
- Governing body: Department of Environment and Water
- Website: Official website

Mount Remarkable National Park is a protected area in the Australian state of South Australia located about 238 kilometres (148 mi) north of the state capital of Adelaide and 25 kilometres (16 mi) east of Port Augusta. It is also the name of the highest peak in the park, with a height of 960 metres (3,150 ft).

On 26 November 2021, a non-contiguous portion of the park to the south of the park, known as the Napperby Block, was combined with several other conservation parks to create the new Wapma Thura–Southern Flinders Ranges National Park.

== History ==
Land associated with the Park at Mambray Creek and Alligator Gorge first obtained protected area status in 1952 as "national pleasure resorts" declared under the then National Pleasure Resorts Act 1914. They were managed by the South Australian Government Tourist Bureau from 1952 to 1967.

In 1964, the National Parks Commission submitted a proposal to the Government of South Australia for "comprehensive national parks" covering an area larger than that of the existing national pleasure resorts. This resulted in the creation of three separate reserves: the Alligator Gorge Wildlife Reserve, the Mambray Creek Wildlife Reserve and the Mount Remarkable Wildlife Reserve, which were constituted in July 1965, September 1967 and March 1966 respectively.

In 1972, the three wildlife reserves were re-proclaimed under the National Parks and Wildlife Act 1972 as the Mount Remarkable National Park. Between 1972 and 1993, the park doubled in size from an area of 8,236 ha (20,350 acres) by the addition of land including the Black Range Lookout and the Bluff in 1976, and by the addition of an "area west of Alligator Gorge containing The Battery", two parts of the Willowie Forest Reserve, and the Napperby Block in 1993. The Napperby Block consists of 16.72 km^{2} (6.46 sq mi) of land, and is non-contiguous to the park. Instead, it is located on the other (southern) side of the Telowie Gorge Conservation Park, immediately east of the town of Napperby, about 4 km (2.5 mi) south of Telowie Gorge and about 12 km (7.5 mi) north-east of the city of Port Pirie.

In 2000, further land was added to the park, which was subsequently named The Warren Bonython Link in honour of Warren Bonython’s "long personal interest in the area" and "his association with the National Parks Foundation". The park had a total area of 18,271 ha (45,150 acres) after this addition.

On 26 November 2021, the Napperby Block was combined with the former Telowie Gorge Conservation Park, Wirrabara Range Conservation Park and Spaniards Gully Conservation to form the Wapma Thura–Southern Flinders Ranges National Park.

== Description ==
The national park consists of two separate areas. The first is the parcel of land (often called a "block") located immediately west of the town of Melrose and consists of three areas: the Warren Bonython Link, Mambray Creek and Mount Remarkable. This block occupies 165.83 km^{2} (64.03 sq mi).

The second parcel of land is known as the Telowie Block and has an area of 0.35 km^{2} (0.14 sq mi). It is located on the west side of the old Telowie Gorge Conservation Park (now part of Wapma Thura–Southern Flinders Ranges National Park) about 7.5 km (4.7 mi) east of the town of Port Germein and about 24 km (15 mi) south of the block located at Melrose.

Its area was 183.62 km^{2} (70.90 sq mi) including the Napperby Block (until 26 November 2021).

The park is classified as an IUCN Category VI protected area.

== Flora and fauna ==
It is filled with a wide variety of reptiles, mammals and birds such as goannas, emus, echidna and kookaburras. It is home to 117 native bird species, including Australian ringnecks and wedge-tailed eagles. Unique mixture of arid and temperate flora intermixing within the region makes Mount Remarkable a biodiversity hotspot. Temperate trees common in the Great Dividing Range such as white box, long leaved box, grey box and South Australian blue gum (Eucalyptus leucoxylon pruinosa) have a presence here. The unique sugar gum is a forest forming eucalypt that is a relict tree of wetter times in South Australia. The Flinders Ranges variety of sugar gum is Eucalyptus cladocalyx petila. Capable of growing to 40 metres tall, along with long leaved box it forms the most northerly biome of open forest in South Australia.

Rusty pods (Hovea purpurea), a bush with beautiful purple pea flowers, is another plant that is otherwise only found in the higher parts of the Great Dividing Range. It can be commonly found only along Mt Remarkable Range; with a few outliers in Wirrabara forest, Mount Brown and Mt Aleck.

The Southern Flinders Ranges also form a geographical barrier between semi-arid plants in the eastern and western halves of Australia.

== Gallery ==
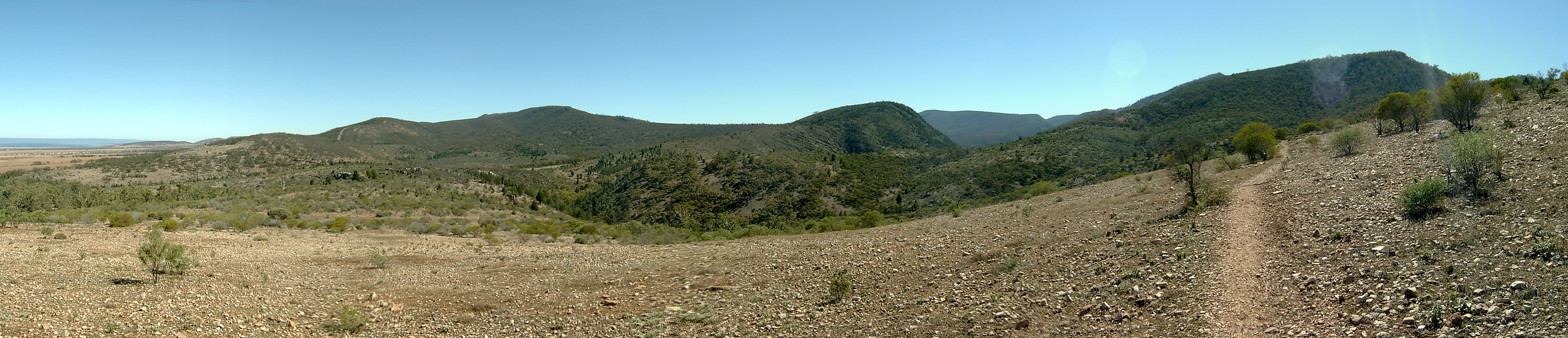
View (looking north) along the Daveys Gully walking trail

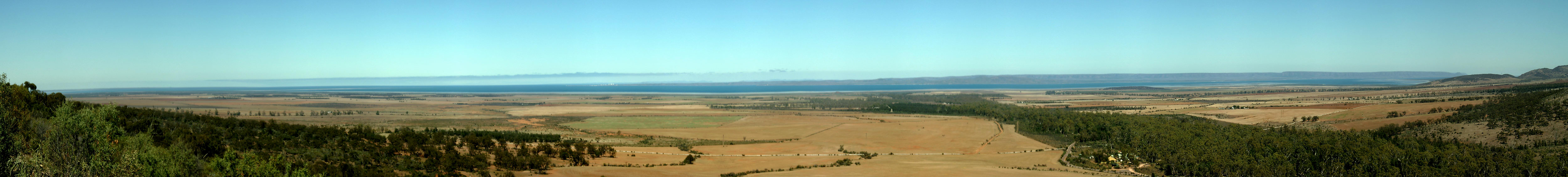
View (looking west) along the Daveys Gully walking trail

== See also ==
- Protected areas of South Australia

== Citations and references ==
=== References ===
- "Mount Remarkable National Park Management Plan Amendment 2013" (PDF). Department of Environment, Water and Natural Resources (DEWNR). September 2013. Archived (PDF) from the original on 11 July 2023.
