= City of Port Augusta =

- Local government area
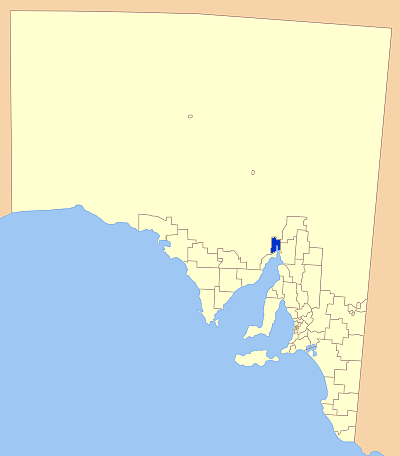
- Location of the City of Port Augusta

- Interactive map of City of Port Augusta
- Coordinates: 32°29′30″S 137°45′44″E
- Country: Australia
- State: South Australia
- Region: Far North
- Established: 1875
- Council seat: Port Augusta

Government
  - Mayor: Linley Shine
  - State electorate: Stuart Giles
  - Federal division: Grey

Area
  - Total: 1,153.1 km^{2} (445.2 sq mi)

Population
  - Total: 13,829 (LGA 2021)
  - Density: 11.99/km^{2} (31.1/sq mi)
- Website: City of Port Augusta
LGAs around City of Port Augusta
| Outback Communities Authority | Outback Communities Authority | Flinders Ranges |
| Outback Communities Authority | City of Port Augusta | Mount Remarkable |
| Whyalla |

The City of Port Augusta is a local government area located at the northern end of Spencer Gulf in South Australia. It is centred on the town of Port Augusta.

== History ==
The Port Augusta region is a natural crossroads and Aboriginals have been trading in the area for 40 000 years. European settlement began in the 1840s. The town grew from a pastoral service centre to a railway town with the construction of the overland telegraph line. Port Augusta's rail importance grew with the start of the railways towards Alice Springs and Kalgoorlie.

The municipality was created as the Corporate Town of Port Augusta on 3 November 1875. A number of smaller separate municipalities were proclaimed in the Port Augusta area, including the Corporate Town of Davenport (August 1887), the Corporate Town of Port Augusta West (October 1887), and the District Council of Davenport (January 1888, later called Woolundunga). The municipalities in the area were amalgamated in February 1933, with Port Augusta West, Davenport and part of Woolundunga merged into a larger Port Augusta municipality. It became the City of Port Augusta, with the granting of city status in late 1964.

The Port Augusta Town Hall was built to house the municipality in 1886–87. It was severely damaged by fire in 1944, and rebuilt in 1946. It was vacated by the City in 1983 after the completion of the new Port Augusta Civic Centre. The former town hall fell into disuse, and was advertised for sale by the state government in June 2015 awaiting redevelopment.

Another major industry was the production of electric power. The city was the site of South Australia's main power supplier, the Port Augusta powerhouse, located on the coast of the Spencer Gulf. Three coal-fired power stations burned coal mined at Leigh Creek, the first of which was completed in 1954. The last of these, the Northern Power Station, was shut down in May 2016. Demolition and rehabilitation of the site was completed in May 2019.

== Localities ==
Towns and localities in the district include:

- Blanche Harbor
- Commissariat Point
- Davenport
- Miranda
- Mundallio
- Port Augusta
- Port Augusta West
- Port Paterson
- Saltia (part)
- Stirling North
- Wami Kata
- Winninowie
- Woolundunga (part)

== Council ==
The City of Port Augusta has a directly elected mayor.

| Party | Councillor | Notes |
|---|---|---|
| Independent | Linley Shine | Mayor |
| Independent | Mike Myers | Deputy Mayor |
| Independent | Louise Foote | |
| Independent | Michael McKinley | |
| Independent | Sam Bates | |
| Independent | Maralyn Marsh | |
| Independent | John Naisbitt | |
| Independent | Nora Bennett | |
| Independent | Linley Shine | |
| Independent | Baldev (Sunny) Singh | |

== Mayors of Port Augusta ==
- T. M. Gibson (1875)
- Thomas Young Jr. (1879–1881)
- Thomas Burgoyne (1881–1882)
- Samuel James Mitchell (1882–1883)
- John Crouch Knipe (1884–1886)
- Villeneuve Francis Smith (1886)
- David Drysdale (1886–1887)
- John George Bice (1887–1889)
- Charles Edward Robertson (1889–1895)
- Noel Augustin Webb (1895–1897)
- Thomas Young Jr. (1897–1900)
- Thomas Hewitson (1900–1908)
- Anthony Edward Carrig (1908–1910)
- Thomas Hewitson (1910–1912)
- Joseph Roberts (1912–1917)
- John Gilbert Partridge (1917–1918)
- Joseph Roberts (1918–1919)
- William Allen Burke Litchfield (1919–1921)
- John Gilbert Partridge (1921–1922)
- Joseph Roberts (1922–1924)
- William Allen Burke Litchfield (1924–1925)
- Keith Henderson Hunter (1925–1932)
- James Beerworth (1932–1936)
- Lindsay Riches (1936–1970)
- William Irvin Charles Howard (1970–1981)
- Joy Baluch (1981–1982)
- Kenneth Charles Naisbitt (1982–1983)
- Joy Baluch (1983–1993)
- R. Robertson (1993–1995)
- Joy Baluch (1995–2013)
- Sam Johnson (2013–2018)
- Brett Benbow (2018–2022)
- Linley Shine (2022-)

== See also ==
- Port Augusta Airport
- Australian Arid Lands Botanic Garden
- List of parks and gardens in rural South Australia
