= Stirling North, South Australia =

Satellite town of Port Augusta, South Australia

Stirling North
- Suburb
- Interactive map of Stirling North
- Coordinates: 32°31′12″S 137°50′13″E
- Country: Australia
- State: South Australia
- Region: Far North
- City: Port Augusta
- LGA: City of Port Augusta
- Location: 311 km (193 mi) North West of Adelaide
- Established: 1859 (sub-division); 17 February 1994 (locality)

Government
  - State electorate: Stuart
  - Federal division: Grey

Population
  - Total: 2,793 (SAL 2021)
- Time zone: UTC+9:30 (ACST)
  - Summer (DST): UTC+10:30 (ACST)
- Postcode: 5710
- County: Frome
- Mean max temp: 24.7 °C (76.5 °F)
- Mean min temp: 13.6 °C (56.5 °F)
- Annual rainfall: 257.0 mm (10.12 in)
Suburbs around Stirling North
Wami Kata	Wami Kata	Saltia
Port Augusta; Port Paterson	Stirling North	Saltia; Woolundunga
Port Paterson	Port Paterson; Woolundunga	Woolundunga
- Location; Adjoining suburbs

Stirling North (known by locals as Catninga) is a town located 8 kilometres (5 miles) east of Port Augusta in the Australian state of South Australia. Its origin was as a reliable watering point in low-rainfall country, used by Aboriginal people since time immemorial, and by settlers since the 1850s. Few people lived there until about 100 houses were built in the 1980s for railway employees and their families – Stirling North railway station has been an important railway junction for up to four main lines. Subsequent residential development was substantial; now the town serves essentially as a satellite to Port Augusta. From a population of 350 in 2008, Stirling North had a population of 2793 at the 2021 census.

== History ==
The locality that became Stirling North was originally known by settlers as Minchin Well, named after Henry Paul Minchin, the Sub-protector of Aborigines, who is known to have visited Aboriginal people at their camp next to a spring they had used for millennia. In 1854 he organised a well to be dug. Later, a standpipe was constructed to provide water for livestock and people. In 1859 Robert Barr Smith laid out a township and named it Stirling after Edward Stirling, his business partner in Elder Smith & Co. Ltd, the firm that became the large agribusiness company, Elders Limited. (Note: Edward Stirling's friendship with Peter D. Prankerd had also resulted in the town of Stirling in the Adelaide Hills being named after him, five years earlier.) Lands Department plans, however, show two towns, as laid out by R.B. Smith in 1859: Stirling North on section 10 and Stirling South on section 870, Hundred of Davenport.

In 1871, it was reported that "The Stirling North Pound was opened ... and a lot of goats were among the first inmates".

In 1916, the state's Nomenclature Committee proposed a change to "Catninga", the name of a creek flowing in the area. Later in the year, however, the official name became Stirling North.

Only in 1994 were suburban boundaries assigned.

== Facilities ==
Stirling North is situated at the base of the Southern Flinders Ranges. A junction of the northbound Augusta Highway and the eastbound Flinders Ranges Way adjoins the town, so it is commonly visited by travellers needing a service stop but who have no need to travel the extra 8 kilometres (5.0 miles) into Port Augusta. The town has a few services including hotel accommodation, food shops, general store, fuel outlets, a post office and public telephones. Sporting venues include a golf course and tennis court, bike track and public park.

A weekday local bus service operates between the Port Augusta city centre and Stirling North.

The town's historic Davenport Reservoir and Storage Tank is listed on the South Australian Heritage Register.
