= Wilmington, South Australia =

Wilmington
- Town
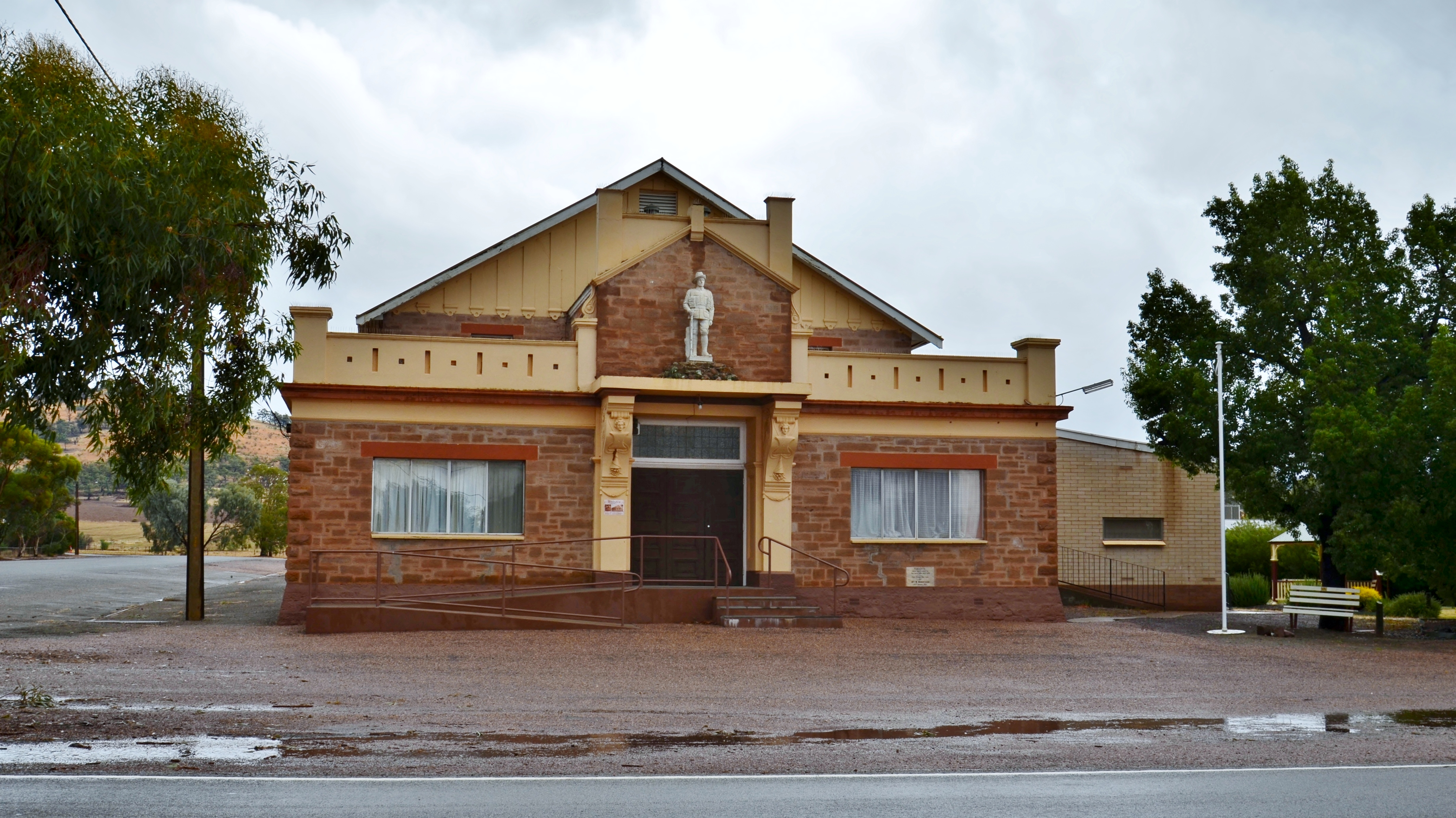
- Wilmington Memorial Hall, 2017

- Coordinates: 32°39′09″S 138°05′56″E
- Country: Australia
- State: South Australia
- Region: Yorke and Mid North
- LGAs: District Council of Mount Remarkable; Flinders Ranges Council
- Location: 220 km (140 mi) N of Adelaide; 43 km (27 mi) SE of Port Augusta; 24 km (15 mi) N of Melrose
- Established: 13 April 1876 (town); 13 March 1997 (locality)

Government
  - State electorate: Stuart
  - Federal division: Grey

Population
  - Total: 472 (UCL 2021)
- Time zone: UTC+9:30 (ACST)
  - Summer (DST): UTC+10:30 (ACST)
- Postcode: 5485
- County: Frome
- Mean max temp: 24.7 °C (76.5 °F)
- Mean min temp: 13.6 °C (56.5 °F)
- Annual rainfall: 437.8 mm (17.24 in)
Localities around Wilmington
Saltia	Quorn; Bruce	Hammond
Woolundunga; Nectar Brook; Mambray Creek	Wilmington	Amyton; Willowie
Baroota	Melrose	Willowie

Wilmington is a town and locality in the Yorke and Mid North region of South Australia.The town is located in the District Council of Mount Remarkable local government area, 305 kilometres (190 mi) north of the state capital, Adelaide.

Originally named "Beautiful Valley", Wilmington is a farming community, known for sheep, wheat and barley, but more recently the temperature conditions and rainfall have contributed to the increasing popularity of the planting of olive groves.

The town has a post office, hotel, two caravan parks, take-away shop, two service stations, primary school, kindergarten, museum and op shop.

It borders the Mount Remarkable National Park and the Alligator Gorge is a 10-minute drive from Wilmington.

Wilmington is a popular place to stay due to its proximity to the tourist areas of the Flinders Ranges, most notably Wilpena Pound.

Wilmington was established as a stop over route for grain and wool being delivered by horse and cart from Port Augusta on its way to Adelaide. The historic Wilmington Coaching Stables on Fourth Street survive and are listed on the South Australian Heritage Register.

The town and surrounding areas formerly had their own municipality, the District Council of Wilmington, which merged into the current District Council of Mount Remarkable in 1980.

== Transport ==
Wilmington was the northern terminus of the Wilmington railway line from 1915 when the line was built until it closed in 1990.

Wilmington is on the Horrocks Highway at the junction where Main North Road turns west to pass through Horrocks Pass, and Horrocks Highway continues north to Quorn, South Australia. South of Wilmington, the same road carries both names to Gawler on the northern outskirts of Adelaide.

== Terka ==
A town was surveyed in 1924 adjacent to the Terka railway siding six kilometres south of Wilmington, which was named from a nearby homestead. The town was "declared ceased to exist" in 1983 and is now considered to be part of the area of Wilmington.
