= County of Newcastle =

Newcastle
- Cadastral division
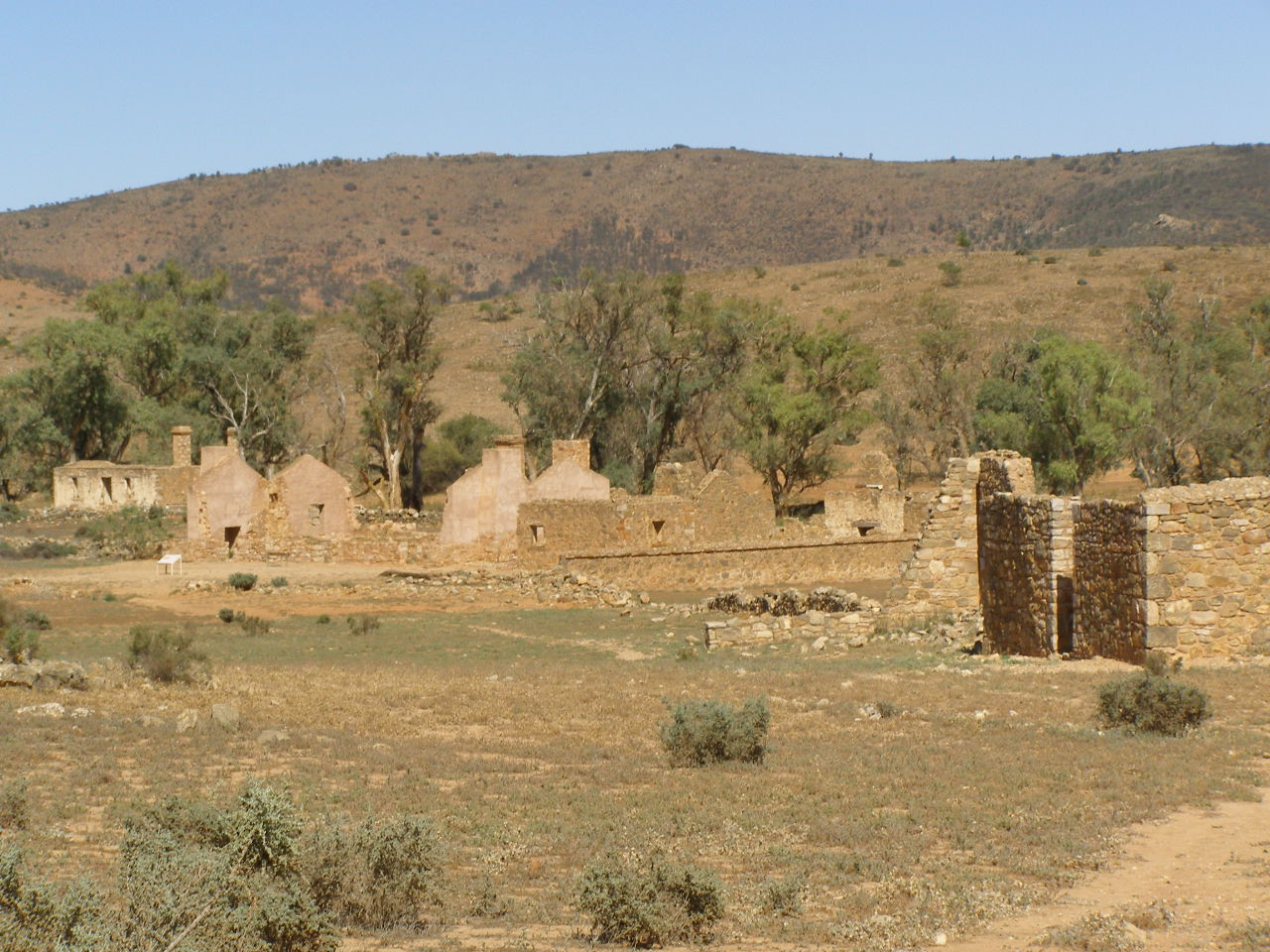
- Kanyaka homestead and surrounding scrub in the Hundred of Kanyaka

- Coordinates: 32°11′50″S 138°05′27″E
- Country: Australia
- State: South Australia
- Established: 22 June 1876

Area
  - Total: 3,160 km^{2} (1,221 sq mi)
Lands administrative divisions around Newcastle
	Blachford	Hanson
Manchester	Newcastle	Granville
Manchester	Frome	Dalhousie

The County of Newcastle is one of the 49 counties of South Australia spanning the central Flinders Ranges. It was named in 1876 for Francis Pelham-Clinton-Hope, the eighth Duke of Newcastle.

== Local government ==
Local government was initiated within the county in 1883 with the establishment of the Corporate Town of Quorn in the Hundred of Pichi Richi in the central south the county. In 1888 the councils of Davenport (later called Woolundunga) and Kanyaka were established, bringing the whole county under local governance.

Local government for the western third of the county (west of Dutchmans Range and Middle Range ridge line, that is, the Hundred of Crozier, the west half of the Hundred of Yarrah, the western majority of the Hundred of Wyacca and the western flank of the Hundred of Pichi Richi) was ceded to the state prior to the abolition of the Woolundunga council in the early 1900s.

In 1969 Kanyaka and Quorn councils amalgamated, uniting the remaining incorporated eastern two thirds of the county under one local government body, the District Council of Kanyaka-Quorn. In 1997, Kanyaka-Quorn amalgamated with the District Council of Hawker to the north to form the much larger Flinders Ranges Council.

== Hundreds ==
The county is divided into the following 9 hundreds:

- Hundred of Wyacca (spanning northern part of Middle Range, Yadlamalka)
- Hundred of Kanyaka (spanning Kanyaka Hill, Kanyaka and surrounds)
- Hundred of Cudlamudla (spanning eastern slopes of Sugar Loaf peak in the Flinders Ranges)
- Hundred of Yarrah (spanning southern part of Middle Range)
- Hundred of Boolcunda (spanning Willochra locality)
- Hundred of Moockra (spanning Moockra locality north of Stokes Hill)
- Hundred of Crozier (spanning Emeroo locality and western slopes of Dutchman Range)
- Hundred of Pichi Richi (spanning eastern slopes of Dutchman Range and centred on township of Quorn)
- Hundred of Palmer (spanning Stephenston locality)
