= Mount Remarkable =

Mountain in South Australia

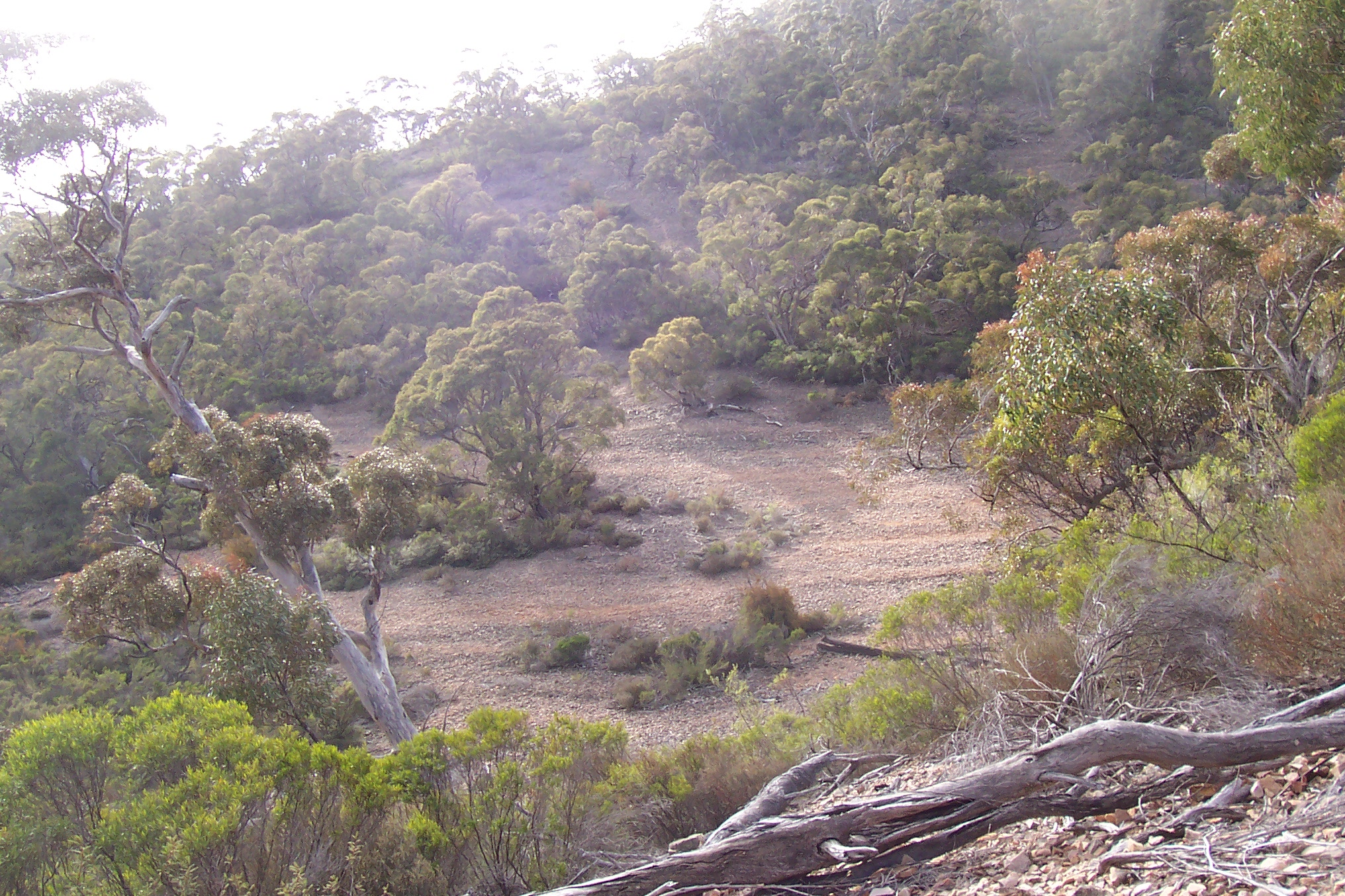
- The slopes of Mount Remarkable

Highest point
- Elevation: 961 m (3,153 ft)
- Coordinates: 32°48′22″S 138°09′53″E

Geography
- Location within South Australia
- Location: South Australia, Australia
- Parent range: Flinders Ranges

Climbing
- Easiest route: Hike

Mount Remarkable is a mountain in South Australia located in the Flinders Ranges about 250 kilometres (160 mi) north of the centre of the capital city of Adelaide and immediately north-west of the town of Melrose, which was once named Mount Remarkable itself, and which is located at its base.

The mountain has a height of 961 metres (3,153 ft). It and the adjoining range is described as having “high strike ridges on quartzite” with “lower rounded ridges on shale” and as having a “cover of forest, parkland and some woodland”. Since 1972, it has been located within the boundaries of the protected area known as the Mount Remarkable National Park. The mountain's summit can be reached via a walking trail known as the Mount Remarkable Summit Hike which starts in the town of Melrose and which is graded by the national park's managing authority as being a “moderate hike’ of a distance of 14 km (8.7 mi) and that has a “round” time of five hours.

The mountain is reported as being discovered by Colonial Europeans and named by Edward John Eyre either in 1839 or on 27 June 1840. Eyre is quoted as saying "from the lofty way it towered above the surrounding hills I named it Mount Remarkable."

== Snow on the Mount ==
Various incidents have occurred when snow has fallen on Mount Remarkable. One of the most notable times recorded was in approximately 1890 when the top half of the Mount was covered in snow.

== Plane Crash ==
On the 3rd of July, 1980 a Piper PA34-200T light aircraft crashed on the mountain. The aircraft was enroute from Leigh Creek, South Australia to Adelaide, South Australia. Harsh weather conditions caused the aircraft to crash. All three occupants were killed on impact.

== See also ==
- List of mountains in South Australia
