= Hundred of Tarcowie =

Tarcowie
- Cadastral division
- Coordinates: 33.020°S 138.504°E
- Country: Australia
- State: South Australia
- Region: Mid North
- LGA(s): Northern Areas
- Established: 20 July 1871

Area
  - Total: 220 km^{2} (85 sq mi)
- County: Dalhousie
Lands administrative divisions around Tarcowie
Booleroo	Pekina	Black Rock Plain
Appila	Tarcowie	Mannanarie
Caltowie	Caltowie	Belalie

The Hundred of Tarcowie is a cadastral unit of hundred located on the south western slopes of the Narien Range in the Mid North of South Australia spanning the township of Tarcowie, the locality of Hornsdale, and surrounds. One of the 12 hundreds of the County of Dalhousie, it was proclaimed in 1871 by Governor James Fergusson and named for an indigenous term thought to mean 'wash away water'.

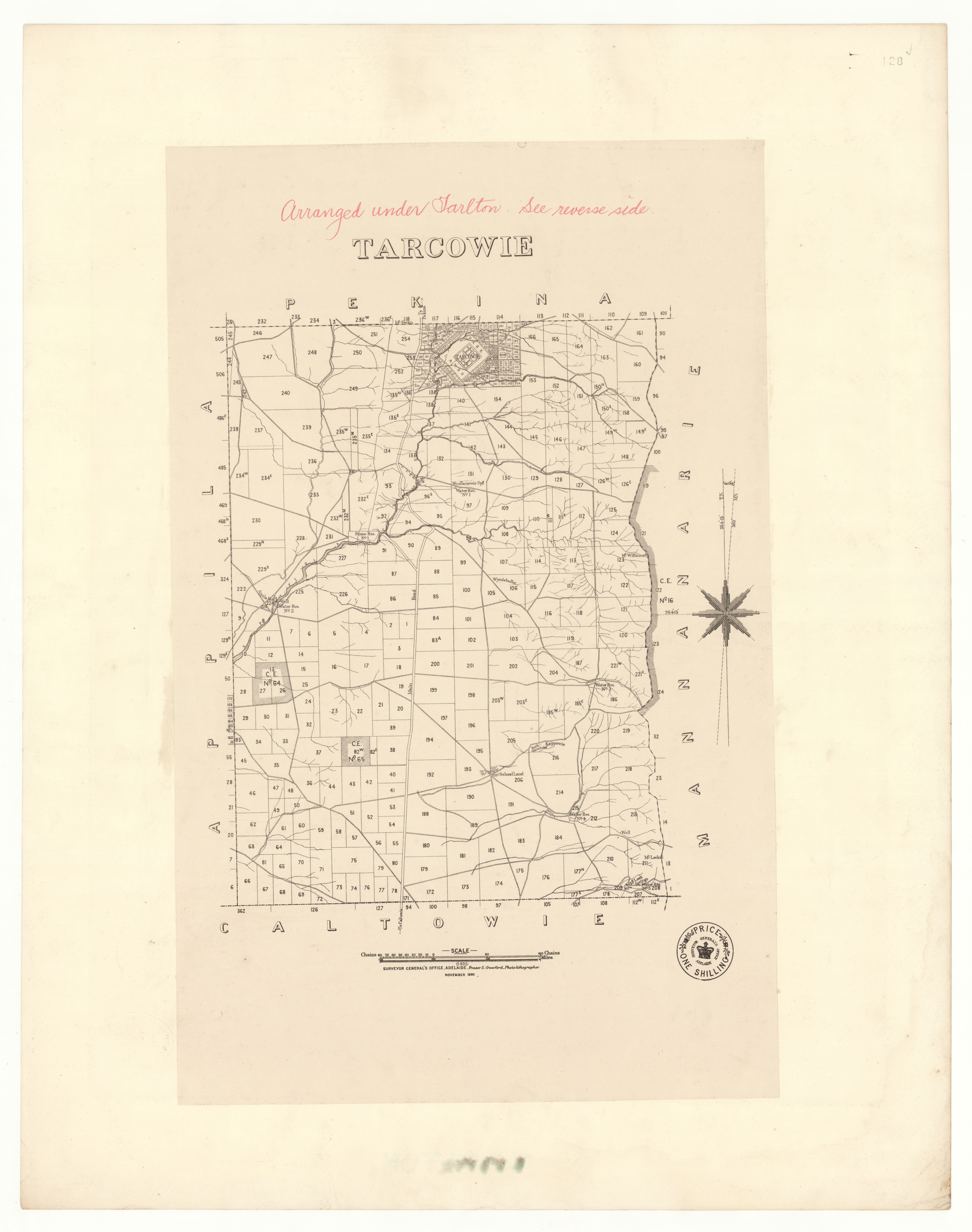
Plan of the Hundred of Tarcowie, 1890

== Local government ==
Local administration of the hundred commenced in 1888, when it was annexed by the District Council of Caltowie following the promulgation of the District Councils Act 1887. In 1935 Caltowie council amalgamated with most of the Belalie council and the Mannanarie ward of Yongala council to form the new District Council of Jamestown. In 1997 Jamestown became part of the much larger Northern Areas Council.

== See also ==
- Lands administrative divisions of South Australia
- Hornsdale Wind Farm
