= Hundred of Caltowie =

Hundred of Caltowie South Australia
- Coordinates: 34.82°S 138.66°E
- Established: 20 July 1871
- Area: 230.5 km^{2} (89.0 sq mi)
- LGA(s): Northern Areas
- Region: Mid North
- County: Victoria
Lands administrative divisions around Hundred of Caltowie:
Appila	Tarcowie	Mannanarie
Booyoolie	Caltowie	Belalie
Booyoolie	Yangya	Belalie

The Hundred of Caltowie is a cadastral unit of hundred in South Australia centred on the township of Caltowie. It is one of the 14 hundreds of the County of Victoria and was proclaimed by Governor James Fergusson in July 1871.

== Towns and localities ==
The Government Town of Caltowie, slightly to the south of the hundred's centre, which was named for the hundred, was surveyed a few months after the hundred proclamation in November 1871. Adjacent localities of Caltowie West and Caltowie North were officially named as such, based on the long associated names, with reference to their position within the hundred. The only other bounded locality within the hundred is the western flank of Jamestown (that part west of the Mannanarie Hills ridge line) on the eastern side of the hundred.

== Local government ==
The District Council of Caltowie was established in 1878, bringing local government to the hundred. In 1935, Caltowie council amalgamated with parts of the District Council of Belalie and District Council of Yongala to form the District Council of Jamestown. In 1997 the Jamestown council was abolished and the hundred became a part of the much larger Northern Areas Council.

== See also ==
- Lands administrative divisions of South Australia
