= Hundred of Yongala =

Yongala
- Cadastral division
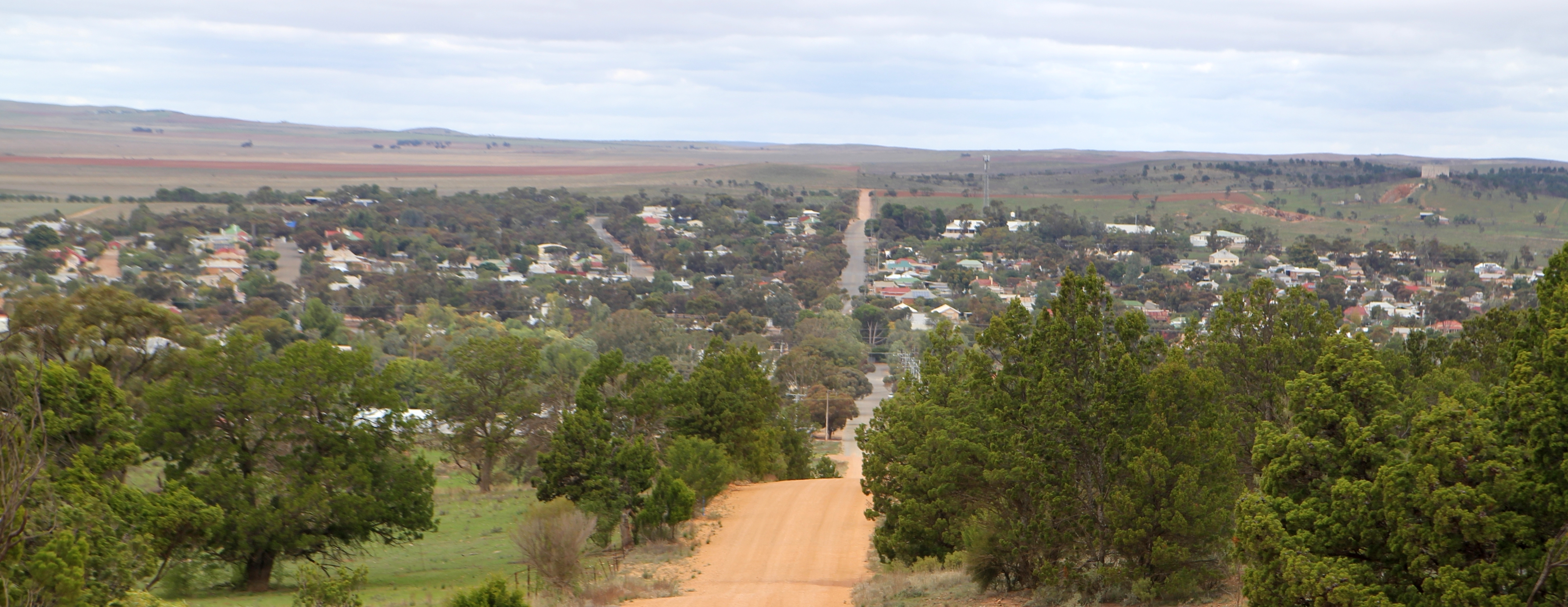
- Peterborough in the hundred's north east

- Coordinates: 33.018°S 138.804°E
- Country: Australia
- State: South Australia
- Region: Mid North
- LGA: District Council of Peterborough
- Established: 20 July 1871

Area
  - Total: 283 km^{2} (109 sq mi)
- County: Dalhousie
Lands administrative divisions around Yongala
Black Rock Plain	Morgan	Coglin
Mannanarie	Yongala	Gumbowie
Belalie	Whyte	Terowie

The Hundred of Yongala is a cadastral unit of hundred located in the Mid North of South Australia. It is one of the 12 hundreds of the County of Dalhousie and was proclaimed by Governor James Fergusson in 1871. The eponymous township of Yongala lies in the west of the hundred and the larger township of Peterborough in the north east. The locality of Sunnybrae occupies the remainder of the hundred.

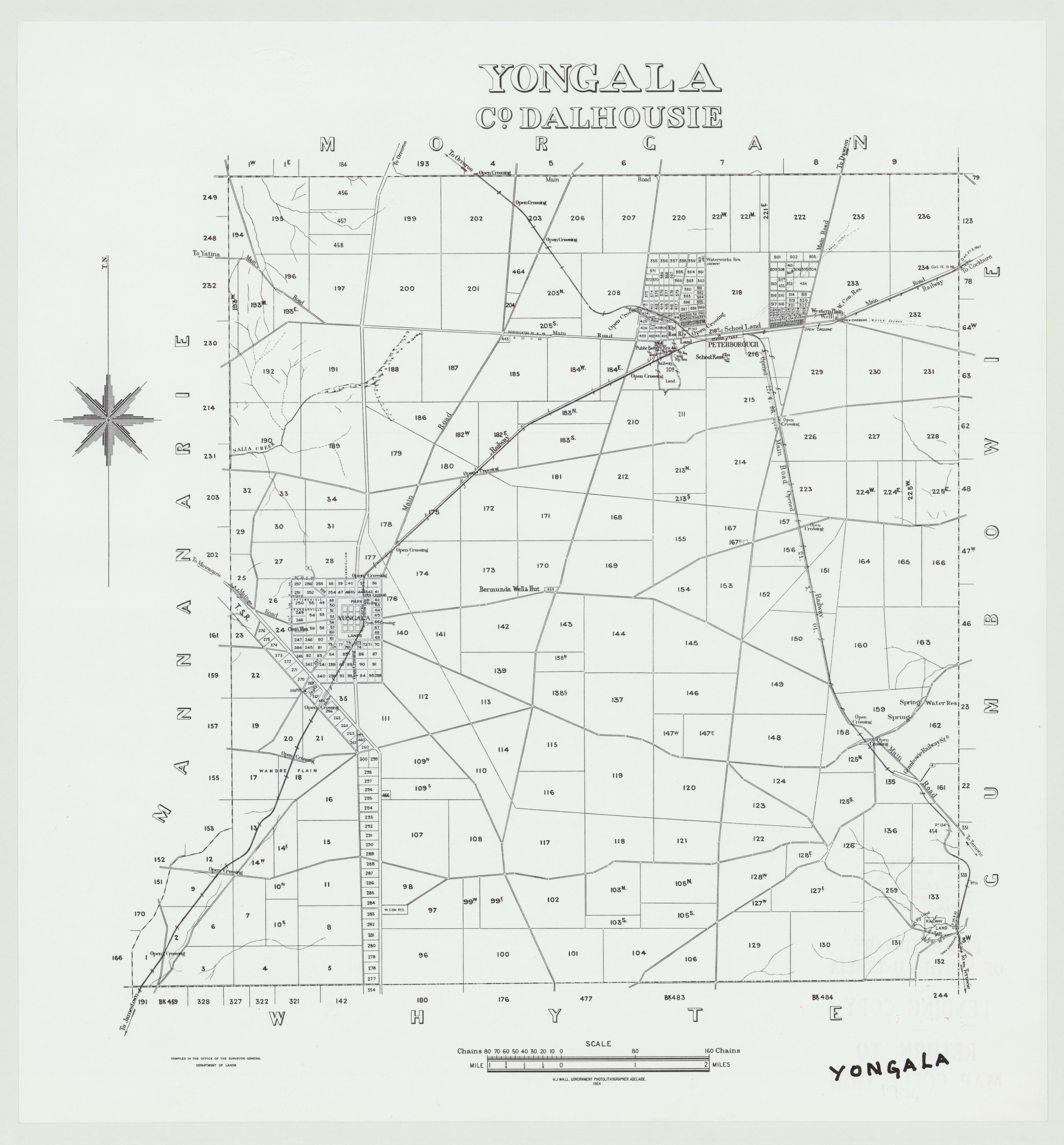
Plan of the Hundred of Youngala in 1964 showing towns of Yongala in the west and Peterborough in the north east

== Local government ==
The District Council of Yongala was established in 1883 bringing local government administration to the hundred for the first time. Shortly after, in 1886, the Corporate Town of Peterborough seceded from Yongala to directly represent the interests of the township of Peterborough in the hundred's north east. In 1935, all that part of the Hundred of Youngala outside the township of Peterborough was absorbed by the new District Council of Peterborough which, like the corporate town, had its council seat within the town. The two were amalgamated in 1997, bringing the hundred back under the administration of a single governing body for the first time in more than a hundred years.
