= Hundred of Booyoolie =

- Cadastral division
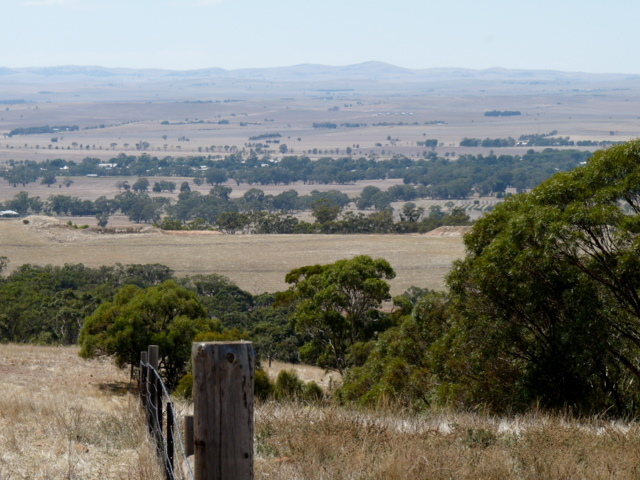
- View over Laura, facing east

- Coordinates: 33.21°S 138.30°E
- Country: Australia
- State: South Australia
- Region: Mid North
- LGA(s): Northern Areas
- Established: 6 July 1871

Area
  - Total: 190 km^{2} (75 sq mi)
- County: Victoria
Lands administrative divisions around Hundred of Booyoolie
Darling	Appila	Appila
Napperby	Booyoolie	Caltowie; Yangya
Crystal Brook	Narridy	Bundaleer

The Hundred of Booyoolie is a cadastral unit of hundred in South Australia. It is one of the 14 hundreds of the County of Victoria and was proclaimed by Governor James Fergusson in July 1871.

The hundred includes the towns of Gladstone, Laura and Stone Hut within its bounds. It was named for Booyoolie Station, the homestead for which was located immediately west of the present township of Gladstone. The source of the station name is unclear. It may have been named for an indigenous phrase meaning "boiling up smoke cloud" but this supposed etymology lacks contemporary corroboration. Official sources suggest the name was a settler invention formed from the words "beau ewe lea".

== Local government ==
The District Council of Booyoolie was established at Laura in 1876, bringing local government to the entire hundred. Southern parts were severed for the District Council of Yangya (later called Gladstone council) and a small northern portion for the Corporate Town of Laura. The local governance of the township of Laura and its surrounds was recombined into the District Council of Laura in 1932. In 1988, local governance of the hundred was brought back under a single body with the creation of the District Council of Rocky River. Ultimately the hundred became part of the much larger Northern Areas Council in 1997.

== See also ==
- Lands administrative divisions of South Australia
