= Northern Areas Football Association =

Australian rules football competition in South Australia

Northern Areas Football Association
Established	1909
Teams	6
2026 Premiers	Jamestown Peterborough
Most premierships	24 – Crystal Brook
2026 leading goalkicker	Oliver Dignan (Orroroo) - 55

The Northern Areas Football Association is an Australian rules football competition based in the Mid North region of South Australia, Australia. It is an affiliated member of the South Australian National Football League.

== Clubs ==
=== Locations ===
Locations of the Northern Areas FA clubs

=== Current ===
Club	Jumper	Nickname	Home Ground	Former League	Est.	Years in NAFA	NAFA Senior Premierships	
Club	Jumper	Nickname	Home Ground	Former League	Est.	Years in NAFA	Total	Years
Booleroo Centre Melrose Wilmington (BMW)		Lions	Booleroo Oval, Booleroo Centre; Melrose Oval, Melrose and Wilmington Oval, Wilmington	–	1991	1991-	2	2001, 2005
Broughton-Mundoora		Eagles	Port Broughton Town Oval, Port Broughton	–	1984	1984-	12	1985, 1986, 1993, 1996, 1997, 2000, 2006, 2016, 2019, 2020, 2022, 2024
Crystal Brook		Roosters	Crystal Brook Oval, Crystal Brook	PPFA, BCFA	1887	1909-1911, 1913-1930, 1935-	24	1910, 1911, 1923, 1939, 1945, 1951, 1954, 1960, 1962, 1963, 1964, 1967, 1971, 1975, 1980, 1981, 1992, 2008, 2011, 2012, 2015, 2017, 2018, 2025
Jamestown–Peterborough		Magpies	Victoria Park, Jamestown	–	2003	2003-	4	2003, 2004, 2014, 2026
Orroroo		Kangaroos	Orroroo Oval, Orroroo	FFA	1885	1972-	13	1976, 1977, 1978, 1982, 1987, 1994, 1995, 1998, 1999, 2002, 2007, 2021, 2023
Southern Flinders		Tigers	Ewart Oval, Gladstone; Wirrabara Oval, Wirrabara and Laura Oval, Laura	–	2002	2002-	3	2009, 2010, 2013

=== Former ===
Club	Jumper	Nickname	Home Ground	Former League	Est.	Years in NAFA	NAFA Senior Premierships		Fate
Club	Jumper	Nickname	Home Ground	Former League	Est.	Years in NAFA	Total	Years	Fate
Booleroo Centre		Demons	Booleroo Oval, Booleroo Centre	FFA	1907	1979-1990	0	-	Merged with Wilmington Melrose in 1991 to form BMW
Caltowie			Caltowie Oval, Caltowie	MLFA	1921	1932-1948, 1951-1958, 1960-1963	2	1952, 1960	In recess 1949-50 and 1959. Merged with Georgetown in 1964 to form Georgetown Caltowie
Georgetown		Demons	Georgetown Oval, Georgetown	YFA	1890s	1914-1915, 1922-1963	13	1926, 1933, 1934, 1935, 1937, 1938, 1940, 1941, 1946, 1947, 1948, 1949, 1952	Merged with Caltowie in 1964 to form Georgetown Caltowie
Georgetown Caltowie		Demons	Georgetown Oval, Georgetown and Caltowie Oval, Caltowie	–	1964	1964-1971	1	1969	Merged with Gladstone in 1972 to form Gladstone Combine
Gladstone	(1909-67)(1968-71)	Panthers	Ewart Oval, Gladstone	–	1882	1909-1971	9	1924, 1928, 1929, 1930, 1950, 1955, 1956, 1957, 1966	Merged with Georgetown-Caltowie in 1972 to form Gladstone Combine
Jamestown	(??-1945)(1946-71)	Magpies	Victoria Park, Jamestown	–	1882	1909-1971	12	1909, 1919, 1920, 1922, 1927, 1931, 1932, 1936, 1958, 1959, 1961, 1968	Merged with Appila in 1972 to form Jamestown Appila
Jamestown Appila		Magpies	Victoria Park, Jamestown	–	1972	1972-2002	6	1983, 1984, 1988, 1989, 1990, 1991	Merged with Peterborough in 2003 to form Jamestown Peterborough
Laura			Laura Oval, Laura	FFA	1880	1909-1911, 1919-1929, 1932-1971	6	1914, 1915, 1921, 1925, 1953, 1971	Merged with Wirrabara in 1972 to form Laura Wirrabara
Laura Wirrabara	(1972-?)(?-2001)	Peckers	Wirrabara Oval, Wirrabara and Laura Oval, Laura	–	1972	1972-2001	0	-	Merged with Rocky River to form Southern Flinders in 2002
Peterborough		Saints	Peterborough Oval, Peterborough	–	1962	1962-2002	4	1965, 1966, 1972, 1979	Merged with Jamestown in 2003 to form Jamestown Peterborough
Port Broughton		Panthers	Port Broughton Town Oval, Port Broughton	BFA	1901	1981-1983	0	-	Merged with Mundoora Wokurna in 1984 to form Broughton-Mundoora
Port Germein		Blues	Port Germein Oval, Port Germein	FFA	1895	1961-1963, 1966-1970	1	1969	Recess between 1963-65. Returned to Flinders FA after 1970 season
Rocky River (Gladstone Combine 1972-2000)	(1972-?)(?-2000)(2001)	Panthers	Ewart Oval, Gladstone	–	1972	1972-2001	2	1973, 1974	Merged with Laura Wirrabara to form Southern Flinders in 2002
Stone Hut			Stone Hut Oval, Stone Hut	FFA	1927	1936	0	-	Folded after 1936 season
Sunnybrae			Yongala Recreation Reserve, Yongala	–	1971	1971	0	-	Folded after 1 winless season in 1971
Terowie		Demons	Terowie Oval ("The Quarry"), Terowie	PFL	1881	1962-1970	0	-	Merged with Yongala to form Sunnybrae following 1970 season
Warnertown		Wombats	Warnertown Oval, Warnertown	BCFA, BFA	1912	1957-1971, 1981-1994	3	1963, 1965, 1970	Played in Broughton FA between 1972-80. Expelled from league due to poor behaviour and lack of juniors in 1995
Washpool						?-1938	0	-	Formed Bundaleer FA in 1939
Wilmington Melrose		Tigers	Melrose Oval, Melrose and Wilmington Oval, Wilmington	BFA	1968	1979-1990	0	-	Merged with Booleroo Centre in 1991 to form BMW
Wirrabara		Peckers	Wirrabara Oval, Wirrabara	FFA	1880	1931-1932, 1938-1967	1	1964	Moved to Flinders FA after 1967 season
Yongala			Yongala Recreation Reserve, Yongala	PFL	1890	1962-1970	0	-	Merged with Terowie to form Sunnybrae following 1970 season

== Brief history ==
The Northern Areas FA was formed in 1909 with founding clubs including Crystal Brook, Gladstone, Jamestown, Orroroo and Laura.

=== Premierships ===
- 1909 JAMESTOWN FC
- 1910 CRYSTAL BROOK FC
- 1911 CRYSTAL BROOK FC
- 1912 NO COMPETITION
- 1913 GLADSTONE FC
- 1914 LAURA FC
- 1915 LAURA FC
- 1919 JAMESTOWN FC
- 1920 JAMESTOWN FC
- 1921 LAURA FC
- 1922 JAMESTOWN FC
- 1923 CRYSTAL BROOK FC
- 1924 GLADSTONE FC
- 1925 LAURA FC
- 1926 GEORGETOWN FC
- 1927 JAMESTOWN FC
- 1928 GLADSTONE FC
- 1929 GLADSTONE FC
- 1930 GLADSTONE FC
- 1931 JAMESTOWN FC
- 1932 JAMESTOWN FC
- 1933 GEORGETOWN FC
- 1934 GEORGETOWN FC
- 1935 GEORGETOWN FC
- 1936 JAMESTOWN FC
- 1937 GEORGETOWN FC
- 1938 GEORGETOWN FC
- 1939 CRYSTAL BROOK FC
- 1940 GEORGETOWN FC
- 1941 GEORGETOWN FC
- 1946 GEORGETOWN FC
- 1947 GEORGETOWN FC
- 1948 GEORGETOWN FC
- 1949 GEORGETOWN FC
- 1950 GLADSTONE FC
- 1951 CRYSTAL BROOK FC
- 1952 GEORGETOWN FC
- 1953 LAURA FC
- 1954 CRYSTAL BROOK FC
- 1955 GLADSTONE FC
- 1956 GLADSTONE FC
- 1957 GLADSTONE FC
- 1958 JAMESTOWN FC
- 1959 JAMESTOWN FC
- 1960 CRYSTAL BROOK FC
- 1961 JAMESTOWN FC
- 1962 CRYSTAL BROOK FC
- 1963 CRYSTAL BROOK FC
- 1964 CRYSTAL BROOK FC
- 1965 PETERBOROUGH FC
- 1966 PETERBOROUGH FC
- 1967 CRYSTAL BROOK FC
- 1968 JAMESTOWN FC
- 1969 GEORGETOWN CALTOWIE FC
- 1970 GLADSTONE FC
- 1971 CRYSTAL BROOK FC
- 1972 PETERBOROUGH FC
- 1973 GLADSTONE COMBINE FC
- 1974 GLADSTONE COMBINE FC
- 1975 CRYSTAL BROOK FC
- 1976 ORROROO FC
- 1977 ORROROO FC
- 1978 ORROROO FC
- 1979 PETERBOROUGH FC
- 1980 CRYSTAL BROOK FC
- 1981 CRYSTAL BROOK FC
- 1982 ORROROO FC
- 1983 JAMESTOWN APPILA FC
- 1984 JAMESTOWN APPILA FC
- 1985 BROUGHTON MUNDOORA FC
- 1986 BROUGHTON MUNDOORA FC
- 1987 ORROROO FC
- 1988 JAMESTOWN APPILA FC
- 1989 JAMESTOWN APPILA FC
- 1990 JAMESTOWN APPILA FC
- 1991 JAMESTOWN APPILA FC
- 1992 CRYSTAL BROOK FC
- 1993 BROUGHTON MUNDOORA FC
- 1994 ORROROO FC
- 1995 ORROROO FC
- 1996 BROUGHTON MUNDOORA FC
- 1997 BROUGHTON MUNDOORA FC
- 1998 ORROROO FC
- 1999 ORROROO FC
- 2000 BROUGHTON MUNDOORA FC
- 2001 BOOLOROO CENTRE/MELROSE/WILMINGTON FC
- 2002 ORROROO FC
- 2003 JAMESTOWN/PETERBOROUGH FC
- 2004 JAMESTOWN/PETERBOROUGH FC
- 2005 BOOLOROO CENTRE/MELROSE/WILMINGTON FC
- 2006 BROUGHTON MUNDOORA FC
- 2007 ORROROO FC
- 2008 CRYSTAL BROOK FC
- 2009 SOUTHERN FLINDERS FC
- 2010 SOUTHERN FLINDERS FC
- 2011 CRYSTAL BROOK FC
- 2012 CRYSTAL BROOK FC
- 2013 SOUTHERN FLINDERS FC
- 2014 JAMESTOWN/PETERBOROUGH FC
- 2015 CRYSTAL BROOK FC
- 2016 BROUGHTON MUNDOORA FC
- 2017 CRYSTAL BROOK FC
- 2018 CRYSTAL BROOK FC
- 2019 BROUGHTON MUNDOORA FC
- 2020 BROUGHTON MUNDOORA FC
- 2021 ORROROO FC
- 2022 BROUGHTON MUNDOORA FC
- 2023 ORROROO FC
- 2024 BROUGHTON MUNDOORA FC
- 2025 CRYSTAL BROOK FC
- 2026 JAMESTOWN PETERBOROUGH FC

== 2006 Ladder ==
Northern Areas	Wins	Byes	Losses	Draws	For	Against	%	Pts	Final	Team	G	B	Pts	Team	G	B	Pts
Booleroo Centre Melrose Wilmington	12	0	4	0	1767	1070	62.28%	24	1st Semi	Broughton-Mundoora	19	20	134	Orroroo	10	10	70
Crystal Brook	11	0	5	0	1723	1518	53.16%	22	2nd Semi	Crystal Brook	17	16	118	Booleroo Centre Melrose Wilmington	12	11	83
Broughton-Mundoora	9	0	7	0	1719	1456	54.14%	18	Preliminary	Broughton-Mundoora	13	15	93	Booleroo Centre Melrose Wilmington	12	14	86
Orroroo	9	0	7	0	1509	1406	51.77%	18	Grand	Broughton-Mundoora	15	14	104	Crystal Brook	13	17	95
Southern Flinders	6	0	10	0	1244	1722	41.94%	12									
Jamestown/Peterborough	1	0	15	0	1121	1911	36.97%	2									

== 2007 Ladder ==
Northern Areas	Wins	Byes	Losses	Draws	For	Against	%	Pts	Final	Team	G	B	Pts	Team	G	B	Pts
Orroroo	12	0	3	1	1610	1289	55.54%	25	1st Semi	Broughton-Mundoora	14	20	104	Southern Flinders	10	9	69
Crystal Brook	11	0	4	1	1804	1487	54.82%	23	2nd Semi	Orroroo	14	20	104	Crystal Brook	13	9	87
Southern Flinders	9	0	7	0	1638	1682	49.34%	18	Preliminary	Broughton-Mundoora	20	11	131	Crystal Brook	13	20	98
Broughton-Mundoora	7	0	9	0	1711	1467	53.84%	14	Grand	Orroroo	12	20	92	Broughton-Mundoora	12	10	82
Booleroo Centre Melrose Wilmington	6	0	10	0	1077	1471	42.27%	12									
Jamestown/Peterborough	2	0	14	0	1401	1845	43.16%	4									

== 2008 Ladder ==
Northern Areas	Wins	Byes	Losses	Draws	For	Against	%	Pts	Final	Team	G	B	Pts	Team	G	B	Pts
Crystal Brook	15	0	1	0	1804	1081	62.53%	30	1st Semi	Booleroo Centre Melrose Wilmington	23	12	150	Broughton-Mundoora	13	7	85
Southern Flinders	9	0	7	0	1605	1492	51.82%	18	2nd Semi	Crystal Brook	19	16	130	Southern Flinders	11	13	79
Broughton-Mundoora	7	0	9	0	1556	1468	51.46%	14	Preliminary	Southern Flinders	9	12	66	Booleroo Centre Melrose Wilmington	3	11	29
Booleroo Centre Melrose Wilmington	6	0	10	0	1106	1310	45.78%	12	Grand	Crystal Brook	23	8	146	Southern Flinders	15	12	102
Orroroo	6	0	10	0	1280	1576	44.82%	12									
Jamestown/Peterborough	5	0	11	0	1218	1642	42.59%	10									

== 2009 Ladder ==
Northern Areas	Wins	Byes	Losses	Draws	For	Against	%	Pts	Final	Team	G	B	Pts	Team	G	B	Pts
Southern Flinders	14	0	2	0	1577	1011	60.94%	28	1st Semi	Broughton-Mundoora	14	15	99	Booleroo Centre Melrose Wilmington	10	7	67
Crystal Brook	11	0	5	0	1591	1324	54.58%	22	2nd Semi	Southern Flinders	17	8	110	Crystal Brook	9	13	67
Broughton-Mundoora	8	0	8	0	1536	1384	52.60%	16	Preliminary	Booleroo Centre Melrose Wilmington	10	11	71	Crystal Brook	9	9	63
Booleroo Centre Melrose Wilmington	8	0	8	0	1339	1278	51.17%	16	Grand	Southern Flinders	16	15	111	Broughton-Mundoora	7	8	50
Jamestown/Peterborough	4	0	12	0	1114	1508	42.49%	8									
Orroroo	3	0	13	0	918	1570	36.90%	6									

== 2010 Ladder ==
Northern Areas	Wins	Byes	Losses	Draws	For	Against	%	Pts	Final	Team	G	B	Pts	Team	G	B	Pts
Southern Flinders	12	0	4	0	1558	1057	59.58%	24	1st Semi	Crystal Brook	20	13	133	Orroroo	16	8	104
Booleroo Centre Melrose Wilmington	9	0	7	0	1514	1426	51.50%	18	2nd Semi	Booleroo Centre Melrose Wilmington	9	12	66	Southern Flinders	9	7	61
Crystal Brook	8	0	7	1	1594	1494	51.62%	17	Preliminary	Southern Flinders	15	11	101	Crystal Brook	8	9	57
Orroroo	7	0	8	1	1249	1331	48.41%	15	Grand	Southern Flinders	11	18	84	Booleroo Centre Melrose Wilmington	11	6	72
Jamestown/Peterborough	7	0	8	1	1337	1588	45.71%	15									
Broughton-Mundoora	3	0	12	1	1174	1530	43.42%	7									

== 2011 Ladder ==
Northern Areas	Wins	Byes	Losses	Draws	For	Against	%	Pts	Final	Team	G	B	Pts	Team	G	B	Pts
Crystal Brook	13	0	3	0	1658	1326	55.56%	26	1st Semi	Jamestown/Peterborough	13	12	90	Southern Flinders	9	6	60
Booleroo Centre Melrose Wilmington	10	0	6	0	1788	1324	57.46%	20	2nd Semi	Crystal Brook	8	15	63	Booleroo Centre Melrose Wilmington	6	9	45
Jamestown/Peterborough	9	0	7	0	1368	1216	52.94%	18	Preliminary	Jamestown/Peterborough	11	12	78	Booleroo Centre Melrose Wilmington	11	10	76
Southern Flinders	8	0	8	0	1415	1231	53.48%	16	Grand	Crystal Brook	23	12	150	Jamestown/Peterborough	15	13	103
Orroroo	7	0	9	0	1300	1449	47.29%	14									
Broughton-Mundoora	1	0	15	0	1178	2161	35.28%	2									

== 2012 Ladder ==
Northern Areas	Wins	Byes	Losses	Draws	For	Against	%	Pts	Final	Team	G	B	Pts	Team	G	B	Pts
Southern Flinders	13	0	3	0	1690	1143	59.65%	26	1st Semi	Broughton-Mundoora	11	9	75	Orroroo	10	6	66
Crystal Brook	12	0	4	0	2015	1319	60.44%	24	2nd Semi	Crystal Brook	13	13	91	Southern Flinders	11	11	77
Orroroo	10	0	6	0	1504	1348	52.73%	20	Preliminary	Southern Flinders	19	15	129	Broughton-Mundoora	10	15	75
Broughton-Mundoora	9	0	7	0	1494	1259	54.27%	18	Grand	Crystal Brook	12	12	84	Southern Flinders	12	7	79
Booleroo Centre Melrose Wilmington	4	0	12	0	1189	1978	37.54%	8									
Jamestown/Peterborough	0	0	16	0	1172	2017	36.75%	0									

== 2013 Ladder ==
Northern Areas	Wins	Byes	Losses	Draws	For	Against	%	Pts	Final	Team	G	B	Pts	Team	G	B	Pts
Southern Flinders	13	0	3	0	1348	868	60.83%	26	1st Semi	Broughton-Mundoora	16	11	107	Crystal Brook	8	14	62
Orroroo	12	0	4	0	1235	748	62.28%	24	2nd Semi	Southern Flinders	18	18	126	Orroroo	5	7	37
Crystal Brook	10	0	6	0	1332	1231	51.97%	20	Preliminary	Orroroo	13	6	84	Broughton-Mundoora	10	9	69
Broughton-Mundoora	7	0	9	0	959	1108	46.40%	14	Grand	Southern Flinders	16	12	108	Orroroo	8	6	54
Booleroo Centre Melrose Wilmington	4	0	12	0	962	1501	39.06%	8									
Jamestown/Peterborough	2	0	14	0	872	1252	41.05%	4									

== 2014 Ladder ==
Northern Areas	Wins	Byes	Losses	Draws	For	Against	%	Pts	Final	Team	G	B	Pts	Team	G	B	Pts
Crystal Brook	14	0	2	0	1512	1004	60.10%	28	1st Semi	Broughton-Mundoora	13	16	94	Orroroo	12	7	79
Jamestown/Peterborough	12	0	4	0	1407	878	61.58%	24	2nd Semi	Jamestown/Peterborough	10	6	66	Crystal Brook	7	12	54
Booleroo Centre Melrose Wilmington	10	0	6	0	1300	1120	53.72%	20	Preliminary	Crystal Brook	6	8	44	Broughton-Mundoora	5	10	40
Orroroo	6	0	10	0	1037	1291	44.54%	12	Grand	Jamestown/Peterborough	13	12	90	Crystal Brook	13	7	85
Broughton-Mundoora	3	0	13	0	886	1364	39.38%	6									
Southern Flinders	3	0	13	0	824	1309	38.63%	6									

== 2015 Ladder ==
Northern Areas	Wins	Byes	Losses	Draws	For	Against	%	Pts	Final	Team	G	B	Pts	Team	G	B	Pts
Crystal Brook	16	0	0	0	1806	825	68.64%	32	1st Semi	Broughton-Mundoora	13	18	96	Jamestown/Peterborough	3	5	23
Southern Flinders	11	0	5	0	979	788	55.40%	22	2nd Semi	Crystal Brook	13	12	90	Southern Flinders	6	9	45
Broughton-Mundoora	7	0	9	0	885	1243	41.59%	14	Preliminary	Broughton-Mundoora	9	7	61	Southern Flinders	6	7	43
Jamestown/Peterborough	6	0	10	0	940	1142	45.15%	12	Grand	Crystal Brook	17	13	115	Broughton-Mundoora	9	12	66
Orroroo	4	0	12	0	1005	1294	43.71%	8									
Booleroo Centre Melrose Wilmington	4	0	12	0	959	1282	42.79%	8									

== 2016 Ladder ==
Northern Areas	Wins	Byes	Losses	Draws	For	Against	%	Pts	Final	Team	G	B	Pts	Team	G	B	Pts
Crystal Brook	15	0	1	0	2001	653	75.40%	30	1st Semi	Southern Flinders	14	6	90	Orroroo	9	4	58
Broughton-Mundoora	12	0	3	1	1624	653	71.32%	25	2nd Semi	Crystal Brook	9	10	64	Broughton-Mundoora	4	4	28
Southern Flinders	10	0	6	0	990	889	52.69%	20	Preliminary	Broughton-Mundoora	16	14	110	Southern Flinders	3	4	22
Orroroo	6	0	9	1	1022	1318	43.68%	13	Grand	Broughton-Mundoora	9	10	64	Crystal Brook	9	9	63
Jamestown/Peterborough	2	0	14	0	547	1760	23.71%	4									
Booleroo Centre Melrose Wilmington	2	0	14	0	584	1495	28.09%	4									

== 2017 Ladder ==
Northern Areas	Wins	Byes	Losses	Draws	For	Against	%	Pts	Final	Team	G	B	Pts	Team	G	B	Pts
Crystal Brook	16	0	0	0	2023	678	74.90%	32	1st Semi	Orroroo	14	7	91	Southern Flinders	7	9	51
Broughton-Mundoora	13	0	3	0	1432	931	60.60%	26	2nd Semi	Crystal Brook	14	14	98	Broughton-Mundoora	9	5	59
Southern Flinders	8	0	8	0	955	1182	44.69%	16	Preliminary	Broughton-Mundoora	14	11	95	Orroroo	6	11	47
Orroroo	8	0	8	0	1189	1155	50.73%	16	Grand	Crystal Brook	15	9	99	Broughton-Mundoora	8	9	57
Jamestown/Peterborough	2	0	12	0	796	1677	32.19%	4									
Booleroo Centre Melrose Wilmington	0	0	16	0	741	1513	32.87%	0									

== Books ==
- Encyclopedia of South Australian country football clubs / compiled by Peter Lines. ISBN 9780980447293
- South Australian country football digest / by Peter Lines ISBN 9780987159199
