= Yongala =

Yongala may refer to:

== Queensland ==
- SS Yongala, a ship lost off the coast in 1911
  - Yongala Lodge, a heritage-listed house in Townsville named after the ship

== South Australia ==
- Hundred of Yongala, a cadastral unit
- Yongala, South Australia, a town
- District Council of Yongala, a former local government area
