= Belalie (disambiguation) =

Belalie is the common name for Acacia stenophylla

Belalie may also refer to the following places in South Australia:

- District Council of Belalie
- Belalie East, South Australia
- Hundred of Belalie
