= District Council of Orroroo =

- Local government area
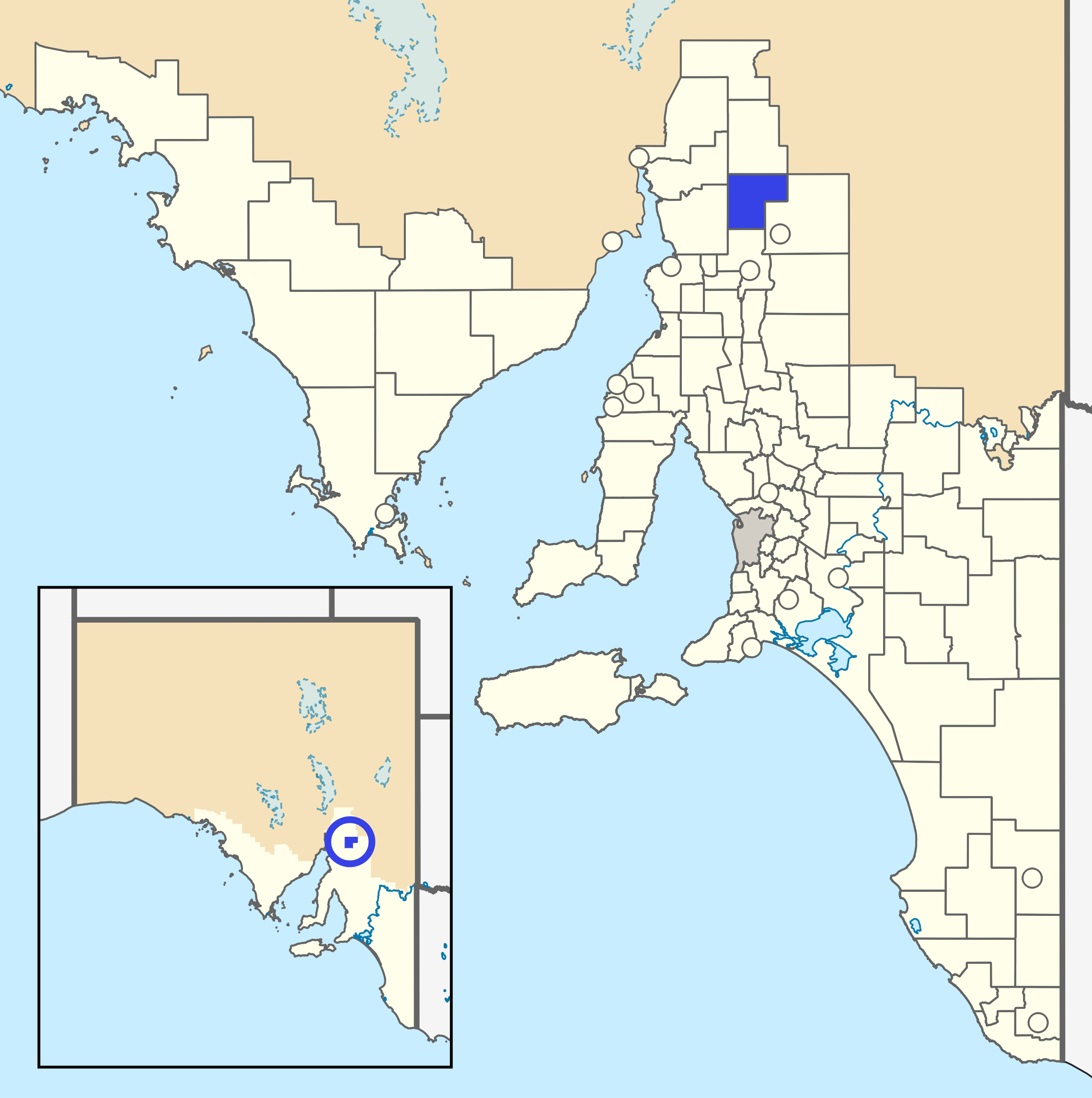
- The District Council of Orroroo as it was prior to disestablishment (blue)
- Coordinates: 32°26′S 137°22′E
- Country: Australia
- State: South Australia
- Established: 1888
- Abolished: 1997
- Council seat: Orroroo
LGAs around District Council of Orroroo
Wilmington/Hammond; Mount Remarkable	Carrieton	Pastoral unincorporated
Wilmington/Hammond; Mount Remarkable	District Council of Orroroo	Coglin; Peterborough
Port Germein; Mount Remarkable	Yongala; Caltowie; Peterborough; Jamestown	Coglin; Peterborough

The District Council of Orroroo was a local government area in South Australia, centred on the town of Orroroo. It was gazetted on 5 January 1888 under the provisions of the District Councils Act 1887 and included all the land defined by the hundreds of Black Rock Plain, Coomooroo, Erskine, Pekina, and Walloway in the County of Dalhousie.

In 1898, it leased the new Orroroo Water District from the South Australian Government and became responsible for local water supply until 1963, when those responsibilities were transferred to the state Energy and Water Supply Department. It built its own powerhouse in 1923, and was responsible for electricity supply until 1962, when Orroroo was connected to the state grid. It had also undertaken a tree planting scheme at Orroroo, Pekina, Morchard, Yatina and Black Rock.

In 1923, the municipality covered an area of 322,880 acres, approximately 500 square miles, and comprising the Hundreds of Black Rock Plains, Coomooroo, Erskine, Pekina and Walloway, each hundred having its own ward. It was responsible for 89½ miles of main roads and 530 miles of district roads. It began sealing town streets in 1930, and finished all streets in the town by 1982. In 1936 it was reported to have approximately 2,000 residents, 700 of them in Orroroo township. A community library, financed in tandem with the Education Department, was established at the Orroroo Area School in 1981.

In 1987, the council published a book on their history, One Hundred Years of Local Government: A History of the District Council of Orroroo 1887–1987 by Gerald J. Kuerschner, June A. Chapman and Jonathan W. Oliver. The municipality to exist in March 1997, when it merged with the adjacent District Council of Carrieton to create the District Council of Orroroo Carrieton; the council seat remained in Orroroo.

== Chairmen ==
- Arthur Addison (1888–1890)
- J. Jamieson (1890)
- J. McCartin
- J. Marron (1892; 1896)
- W. Toop (1916–1919)
- F. P. Keats (1919–1920)
- Enos Copley (1920–1921)
- Martin Redden (1921)
- C. Halliday
- Arthur Lewis Brice
- James G. Crocker (1935)
- Lewis George Toop (1935–1936)
- Charles Traugott Kuerschner (1936–1937)
- Lewis George Toop (1937–1947)
- Lewis McNaughton Brice (1947–1948)
- Lewis George Toop (1948–1950)
- Harold Andrew Brooks (1950–1951)
- Jack Oswald Fogden (1951–1958)
- Leonard Kevin Duffy (1958–1973)
- Clarence Andrew Brooks (1973–1974)
- Murray Rollsen Gibb (1974–1982)
- Gerald Joseph Kuerschner (1982–1995)

== Notable councillors ==
- John Travers (1902–1905), state MP 1906–1910 and 1912–1918
