= George Hingston Lake =

Australian politician

George Hingston Lake (10 December 1847 – 31 October 1900) was a politician in the early days of colonial South Australia.

== History ==
George was born in London to Henry Lake and his wife Ann née Trehane. arrived in South Australia with his parents and brother James (1840–1876) in 1853.

He worked with his father and brother on a sheep station, near the Barrier Range for five years, then spent three years studying law, articled to the brother James.

He served as accountant for brother James and Charles John Reynolds, later mayor of Port Adelaide, who owned, as Lake & Reynolds, a timber merchant's business in Port Adelaide from 1871 to 1877. He worked for Clare lawyer T. R. Bright, managing his office in the rapidly developing town of Jamestown, where he remained for many years, and when the Corporate Town of Jamestown was proclaimed in 1878, Lake served as their first town clerk, with (later Sir) John Cockburn as mayor. He was appointed Justice of the Peace in 1883, the year he resigned from the council to concentrate on the local newspaper Agriculturist and Review which he purchased in 1881 as the Jamestown Review. He was the first secretary of the South Australian Farmers' Co-operative Union, a limited liability company founded in Jamestown in 1888. He sold the Review to Alfred Gage in 1903.

With support and encouragement from Cockburn, he was elected to the seat of Burra in the South Australian House of Assembly and served from April 1890 to April 1896. He was a useful member, though he rarely entered into debates.

== Family ==
He married Marion Rogers (c. 1851 – 19 September 1926), daughter of William Rogers, on 19 November 1874. They lived at Jamestown, then Marlborough street, Malvern. They had one son, Clement William Hingston "Clem" Lake (13 September 1882 – 3 November 1941)
