= Hundred of Belalie =

Belalie
- Cadastral division
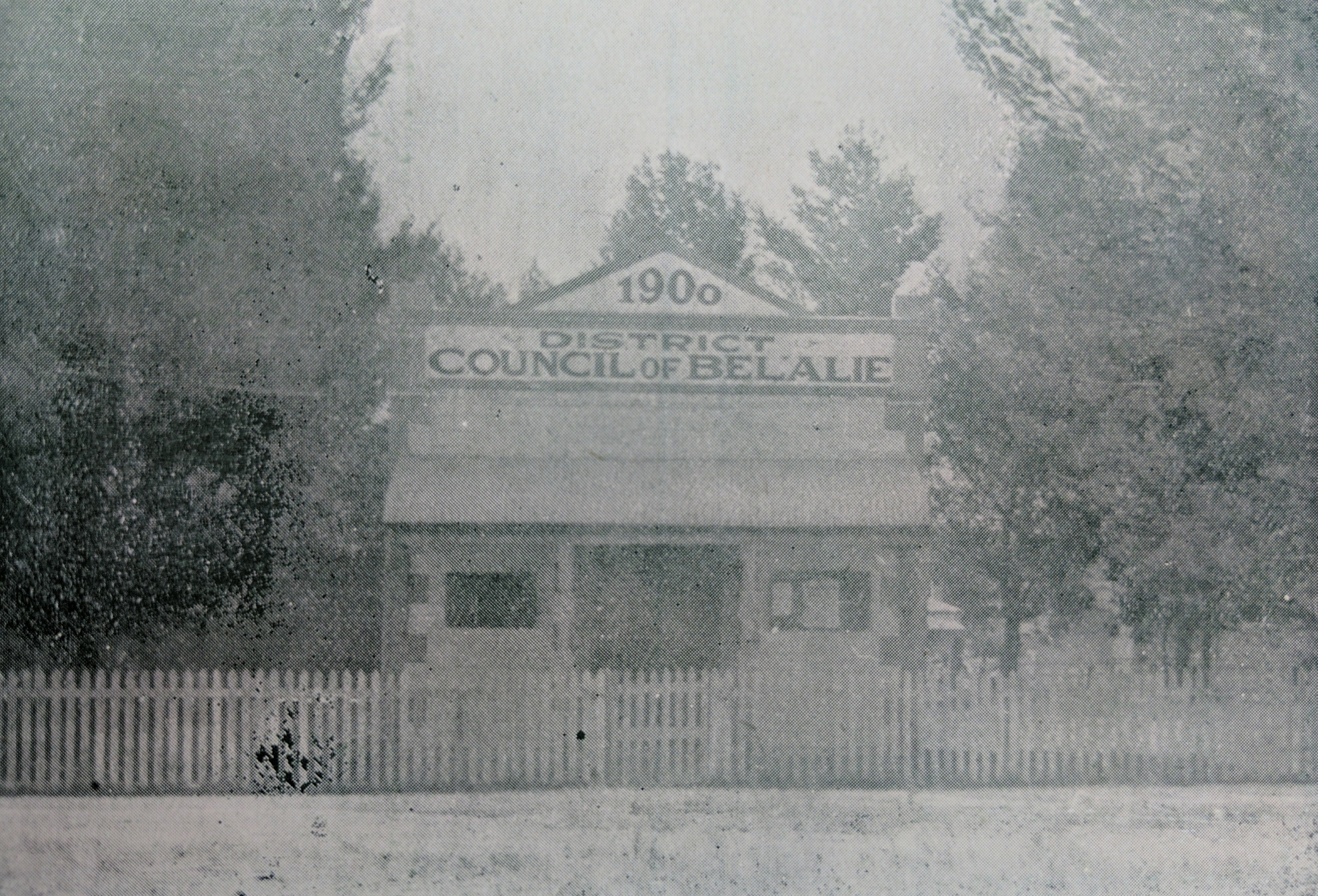
- Belalie Council office

- Coordinates: 33°13′16″S 138°38′26″E
- Country: Australia
- State: South Australia
- Region: Yorke and Mid North
- LGA(s): Northern Areas Council
- Established: 10 February 1870

Area
  - Total: 370 km^{2} (144 sq mi)
- County: Victoria
Lands administrative divisions around Belalie
Dalhousie	Dalhousie	Dalhousie
Caltowie; Yungya	Belalie	Whyte
Bundaleer	Reynolds	Anne

The Hundred of Belalie is a cadastral unit of hundred located in the Mid North of South Australia in the approach to the lower Flinders Ranges. It is one of the hundreds of the County of Victoria and its main town is Jamestown, South Australia. The Hundred corresponded to the former District Council of Belalie. The rural localities of Belalie North and Belalie East derive from the hundred.

== See also ==
- Belalie Creek
- District Council of Belalie
- Belalie East, South Australia
- Belalie (insect)
