= District Council of Caltowie =

Abolished local government area in South Australia

Coordinates: 33°10′51″S 138°28′58″E

The District Council of Caltowie was a local government area in South Australia, centred on the town of Caltowie and surrounding cadastral Hundred of Caltowie. It came into operation on 28 February 1878, with the first five councillors appointed by proclamation. The town and hundred had both been laid out in 1872. The council initially met in local hotels, leased private offices for a period, and met at Hornsdale Station for a year, before constructing purpose-built council offices in Charles Street, Caltowie, in 1896.

The council was initially divided into four wards: Central, South-Western and North-Western, electing one councillor, and Eastern, electing two councillors. It gained the previously unincorporated Hundred of Tarcowie under the District Councils Act 1887, which resulted in a system of ten councillors representing as many wards. By 1904, this had been reduced to six councillors representing one ward each. The council was responsible for an area of nearly 200 square miles in that year.

The District Council of Caltowie was abolished on 1 May 1935, when it amalgamated with the District Council of Belalie and the Hundred of Mannanarie from the District Council of Yongala to form the District Council of Jamestown.

== Chairmen of the District Council of Caltowie ==
- T. Williams (1878–1879)
- E. Seikmann (1879–1881)
- T. Williams (1883)
- A. McCallum (1890–1892)
- J. G. Lehmann (1897)
- A. Kerr (1903–1904)
- M. F. Leahy (1928–1931)
