= Corporate Town of Jamestown =

Local government area in South Australia

Coordinates: 33°12′19″S 138°36′7″E

The Corporate Town of Jamestown was a local government area in South Australia, centred on the town of Jamestown. It was proclaimed on 25 July 1878, severing the seven-year old settlement of Jamestown from the surrounding District Council of Belalie. The first mayor was John Cockburn, later Premier of South Australia, with George Hingston Lake as town clerk. Under the new council, it instituted a tree planting program from 1879, reportedly the first town in rural South Australia to do so.

In 1881, it was reported to have a population of 995; while this remained static for some decades, by 1936, it was reported to have a population of over 1,500, with 361 dwellings and 106 businesses, with the surrounding area described as "one of the best agricultural districts in this state". In the 1950s, the council offices were based out of the former Jamestown Institute, by then converted to a memorial hall. In 1979, the council launched a program of kerbing and sealing Jamestown streets. On 1 January 1991, it merged into the surrounding District Council of Jamestown; the merged council would itself amalgamate with surrounding municipalities to form the Northern Areas Council in 1997.

== Mayors ==
- John Cockburn (1878–1881)
- Hillary Boucaut (1881)
- James Wilkinson (1884)
- William Haslam (1890)
- Hillary Boucaut (1892)
- Thomas Carter (1893–1895)
- William Blair Aitken (1898)
- Donald Rosie (1907)
- Ralph Edmund Humphris (1918–1921)
- J. Firmin Jenkins (1921)
- L. M. W. Judell (1928)
- Patrick Joseph McCarthy (1933–1935)
- Douglas le Rey Boucaut (1935–1937)
- Edmund Thomas Daly (1937–1946)
- Patrick Joseph McCarthy (1946–1948)
- Edmund Thomas Daly (1948–1949)
- Ross McLennan (1949–1951)
- Robert Leach Parnwell Knight (1951–1955)
- Raphael James Parri (1955–1959)
- Gordon Gilfillan (1959–1962)
- William Glanville Thomas (1962–1966)
- Brian Norman Williams (1966–1970)
- Reginald Peter Octoman (1970–1973)
- Eric Stanley Robinson (1973–1977)
- George McMillan Polomka (1977–1982)
