= District Council of Carrieton =

- Local government area
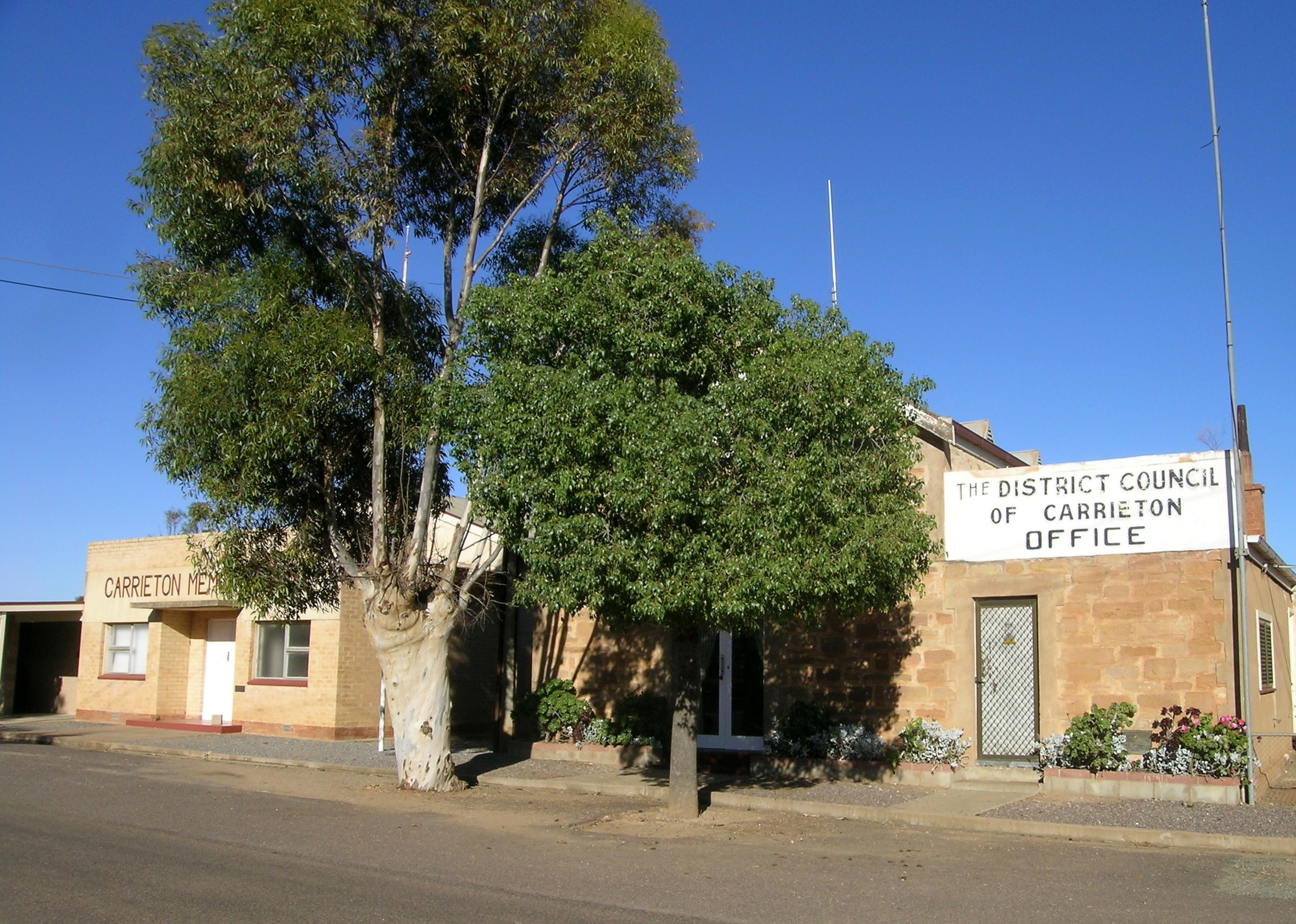
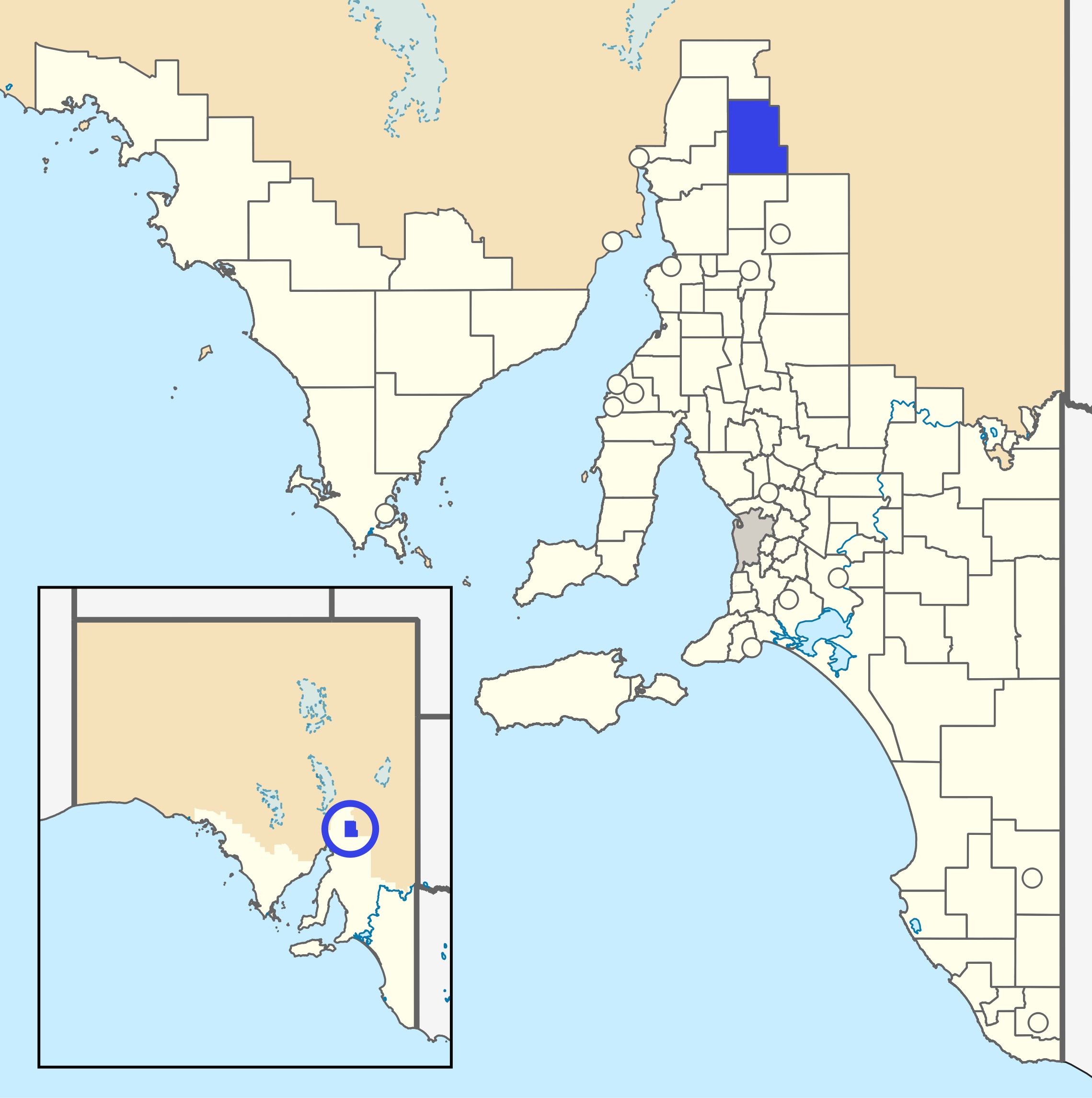
- The former offices of the District Council of Carrieton, adjoining the Memorial Hall, in 2011 The District Council of Carrieton as it was prior to disestablishment (blue)
- Coordinates: 32°26′S 138°32′E
- Country: Australia
- State: South Australia
- Established: 1888
- Abolished: 1997
- Council seat: Carrieton
LGAs around District Council of Carrieton
Kanyaka	Hawker
Kanyaka; Wilmington/ Hammond	District Council of Carrieton
Wilmington/ Hammond	Orroroo	Coglin; Peterborough

The District Council of Carrieton was a local government area in South Australia, centred on the town of Carrieton from 1888 until 1997.

== History ==
The council was established on 5 January 1888 as the District Council of Eurelia under the provisions of the District Councils Act 1887. The name of the municipality was changed to Carrieton on 31 May 1894, and was divided into six wards in 1896.

In 1923, the municipality covered 491,200 acres, 33 miles in length and 26 miles in breadth. It had consisted of the Hundreds of Bendleby, Eurelia, Eurilpa, McCulloch, O'Laddie, Uroonda, Yalpara and Yanyarrie since 1896, when two earlier additional hundreds (Minburra and Waroonce, together comprising the council's Minburra Ward) were severed. In 1923, it included the towns of Belton, Carrieton, Eurelia and Johnburgh, with 107 of the municipality's 847 residents living in Carrieton.

Council chambers for the municipality were built in 1892 in Carrieton. On 10 August 1920, the council office, adjacent to the chambers, burnt down in a catastrophic fire, with the loss of all of the council's records to that date, and the death of the incumbent council clerk. The chambers were saved but the offices were completely gutted. A coronial inquest found that the clerk "came to his death...of his own act, but the evidence does not show whether such taking was accidental or incidental."

The municipality ceased to exist in March 1997, when it merged with the adjacent District Council of Orroroo to create the District Council of Orroroo Carrieton.

== Chairmen of the District Council of Carrieton ==
- R. Sampson (1900)
- W. H. Heaslip (1904–1905)
- M. P. Daly (1910)
- F. W. Whyte (1915)
- T. M. Williams (1918–1922)
- C. Halliday (1926)
- T. M. Williams (1936)
- Edmund Patrick Wall (1937–1958)
- Sidney Frank Heaslip (1958–1970)
- Ross Toufeek Rasheed (1970–1976)
- William Arthur Shepherd (1976–1981)
- Sidney Frank Heaslip (1981–1983)
- Michael Thomas Manning (1983–?)
