= Stone Hut =

Stone Hut South Australia
- Coordinates: 33°06′11″S 138°17′53″E
- Population: 30 (SAL 2021)
- Postcode(s): 5480
- Time zone: ACST (UTC+9:30)
  - Summer (DST): ACST (UTC+10:30)
- Location: 7 km (4 mi) north of Laura; 7 km (4 mi) south of Wirrabara
- LGA(s): Northern Areas Council
- Region: Yorke and Mid North
- County: Victoria
- State electorate(s): Stuart
- Federal division(s): Grey
Localities around Stone Hut:
Wirrabara
Stone Hut
Laura

Stone Hut is a small town in the Mid-north of South Australia, situated on the Horrocks Highway (section of Main North Road) midway between Laura and Wirrabara.

== History ==
Stone Hut was founded in 1874 as a subdivision of part section 3522, Hundreds of Booyoolie and Appila by Robert Hall of Jamestown and John Henderson of Glen Osmond. It was named for a four-room hut built in the early 1850s by stonemason Thomas Long, which served as a shelter for shepherds and later as a mail coach station for Cobb and Co on the route between Clare and Port Augusta.

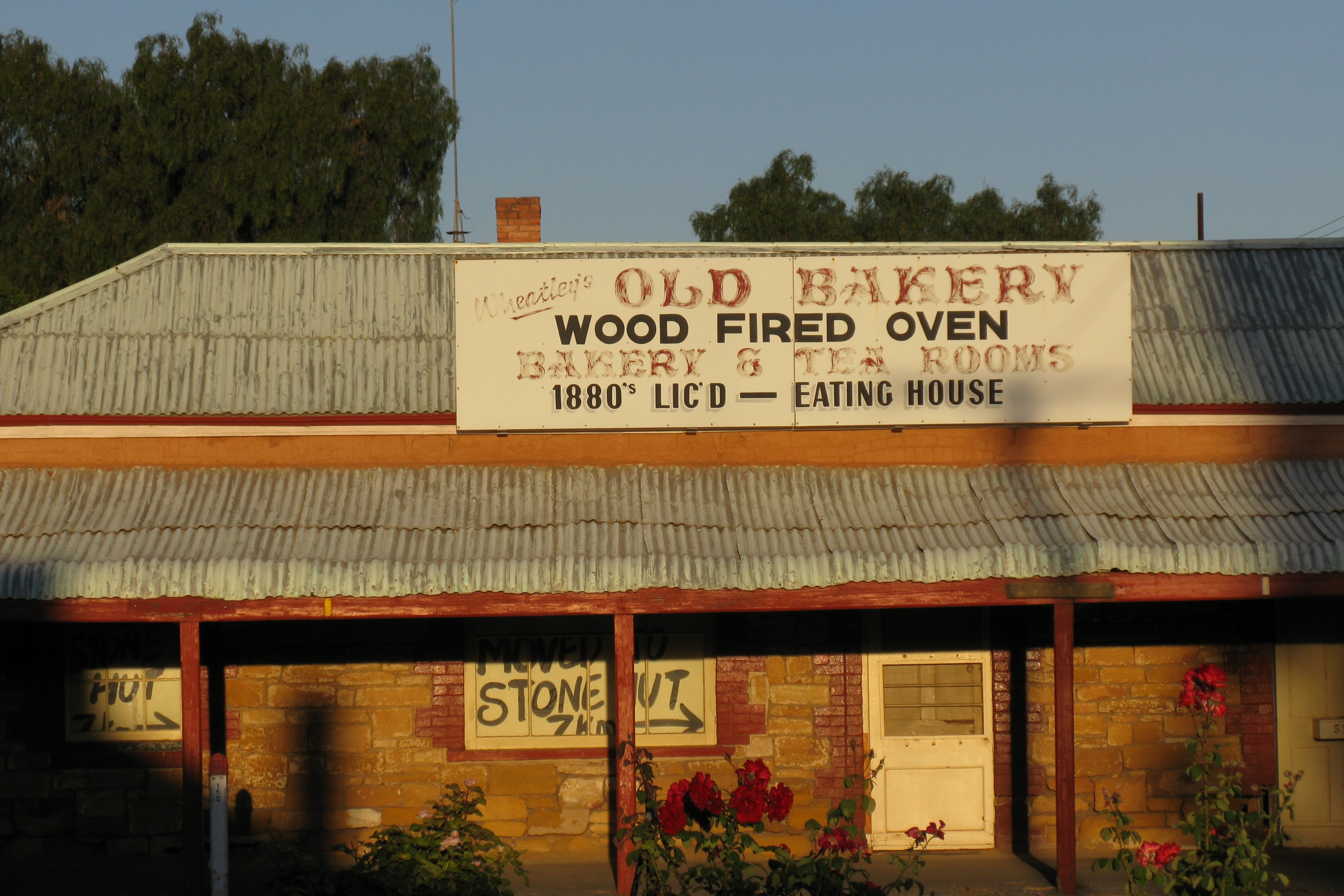
Old bakery, Wirrabara

The town received a boost when the Wheatley's "Old Bakery" moved thence from Wirrabara around 2005.
