= District Council of Yongala =

- Local government area
- Coordinates: 33°01′46″S 138°44′56″E
- Country: Australia
- State: South Australia
- Established: 1883
- Abolished: 1935
- Council seat: Yongala

Area (1888)
  - Total: 1,600 km^{2} (600 sq mi)
LGAs around District Council of Yongala
Orroroo	Orroroo	Coglin
Caltowie	District Council of Yongala	Coglin
Caltowie	Belalie; Terowie	Terowie

The District Council of Yongala was a local government area in South Australia from 1883 to 1935, seated at Yongala.

== History ==
The council was established on 8 March 1883 as the first local government in the area. It initially covered only the Hundred of Yongala, consisting of the towns of Petersburg (now Peterborough) and Yongala, and the surrounding farmland. While there had been agitation for municipal government in the area, it met with opposition from Petersburg residents who did not want to pay taxes to the larger council, with the South Australian Register reporting in February 1883, the month before it was gazetted, that "excitement had cooled" and that they did not expect it to be created that year.

In 1883, it had an area of 200 square miles, which was valued at £203,630. On 7 October 1886, Petersburg separated as the Corporate Town of Petersburg, taking with it a significant amount of the municipal population. The promulgation of the District Councils Act 1887 in January 1888 added the adjacent but lightly populated Hundred of Mannanarie and Hundred of Morgan to the Yongala council. The 1888 additions expanded the council to an area of 600 square miles, valued at £542,500. Two further portions of Yongala were annexed to Petersburg in 1888 and 1897. It was divided into three wards on 7 June 1888 (Mannanarie, Morgan and Yongala), each electing two councillors. As of 1934, its chambers were located in Yongala.

It was abolished in 1935 following a Local Government Commission report that advocated cutting the number of municipalities in South Australia from 196 to 142. The subsequent legislation saw the remaining section of the Hundred of Yongala and the Hundred of Morgan merge with the District Council of Coglin and a portion of the Corporate Town of Peterborough to form the District Council of Peterborough, while the Hundred of Mannanarie was added to the new District Council of Jamestown.

== Chairmen ==
- William Tickle (1883–1884)
- Frederick Hodby (1884–1885)
- A. D. Bruce (1885–1886)
- J. Cheek (1886–1888)
- P. Hehir (1888–1889)
- Frederick Hodby (1889–1895)
- William Miller (1895–1908)
- M. McCallum (1908–1912)
- P. J. Kerin (1912–1920)
- D. T. Robinson (1920)
- James Jamieson (1920–1924)
- R. M. Cram (1924–1926)
- Herbert Frederick Jones (1926–1935)
