= John Cockburn (Australian politician) =

Australian politician (1850–1929)

The Honourable Sir John Cockburn KCMG KStJ
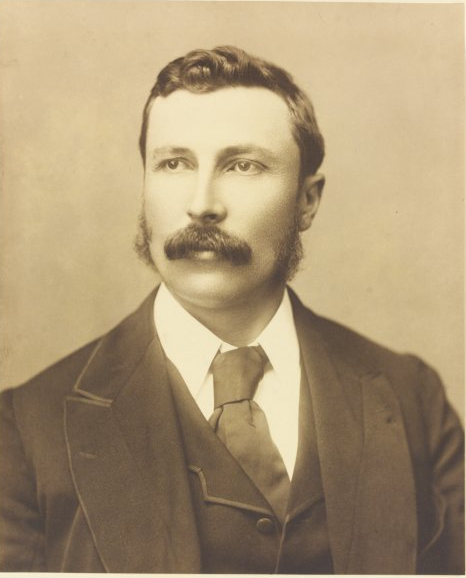

18th Premier of South Australia
- In office 27 June 1889 – 19 August 1890
- Monarch: Victoria
- Governor: Earl of Kintore
- Preceded by: Thomas Playford II
- Succeeded by: Thomas Playford II

6th Leader of the Opposition (SA)
- In office 1889–1889
- Preceded by: John Downer
- Succeeded by: Thomas Playford II

Personal details
- Born: John Alexander Cockburn; 23 August 1850 Berwickshire, Scotland, United Kingdom
- Died: 26 November 1929 (aged 79) London, England
- Party: Liberal

Sir John Alexander Cockburn KCMG KStJ (23 August 1850 – 26 November 1929) was Premier of South Australia from 27 June 1889 to 18 August 1890.

== Early life ==
Cockburn was born in Corsbie, Berwickshire, Scotland, in 1850 to Thomas Cockburn, farmer, and his wife Isabella, née Wright. His father died in France in 1855, and his mother migrated to South Australia in 1867 with three of the four children. Cockburn remained in the UK and was educated at Highgate School, and King's College London, he obtained the degree of M.D. London, with first class honours and gold medal.

In 1875, he married Sarah Holdway (the daughter of Forbes Scott Brown), and they had one son and one daughter. In 1879, he emigrated to South Australia and set up practice at Jamestown in the mid North.

== Political career ==
In 1878, Cockburn was elected as the first mayor of the Corporate Town of Jamestown. In that role he lobbied the Government of South Australia to construct a railway line to the New South Wales border to tap the newly developed silver mining fields of the Barrier Ranges.

Between 1884 and 1888, during Cockburn's parliamentary career, the South Australian Railways line through Jamestown to Petersburg was extended to the border to meet the tramway built by the Silverton Tramway Company, which linked the growing mines of Broken Hill to the South Australian coast at Port Pirie, where a smelter was built in 1889, effectively capturing the economic benefits of the Broken Hill mining field for South Australia. The town surveyed at the colonial border in 1886 was named Cockburn in his honour.

Cockburn stood for Burra in the South Australian House of Assembly in 1884, serving as Minister of Education from 1885 to 1887 (under premier John Downer) before losing that seat and returning as member for Mount Barker, elected in April 1887 and holding that seat for 11 years.

In 1884 Cockburn was able to pass progressive legislation including succession duties and land tax, and in 1886 was involved in introducing payment for members of the South Australian parliament.

On 27 June 1889, Cockburn became the first doctor to become premier, a role he held for fourteen months before he lost a no-confidence motion and handing back to Thomas Playford.

He was Minister for Education again and Minister for Agriculture in the Kingston ministry from 1893 until April 1898.

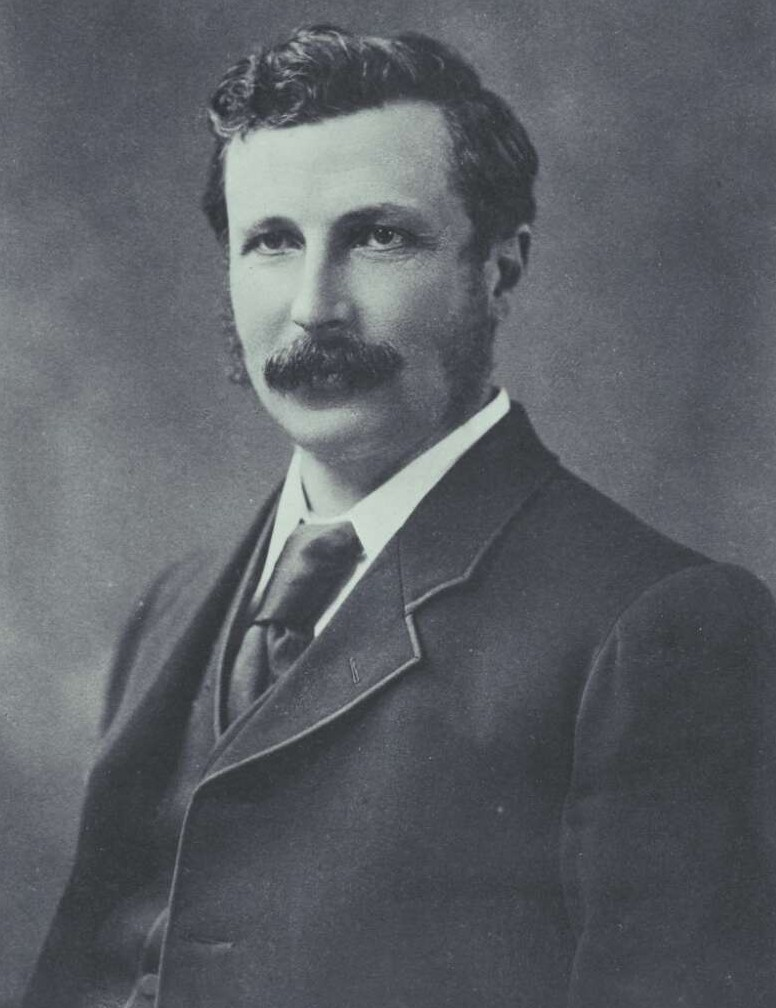
Cockburn at the 1898 Australasian Federal Convention in Melbourne.

He was active in the planning of Federation, including representing South Australia at the Australasian Federal Conference of 1890, the National Australasian Convention of 1891, and, most importantly, the Australasian Federal Convention of 1897–8. At the Convention he had the equal best attendance record of the fifty or so delegates, but almost as often as not was on the losing side in its votes, reflecting in part his independence of faction.

== Women's Suffrage ==
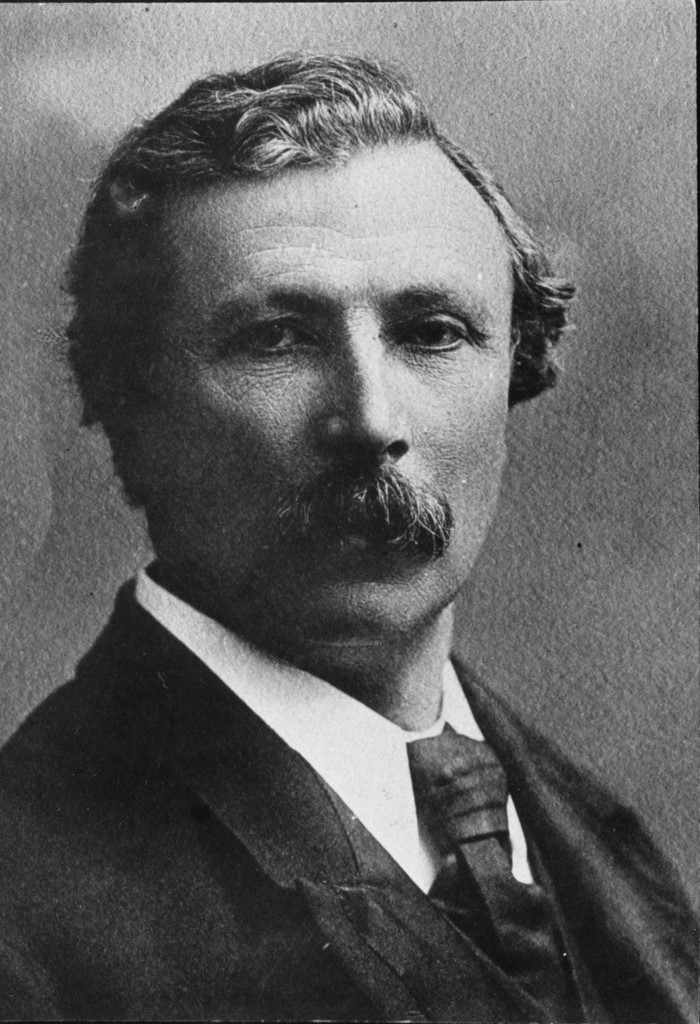

Cockburn supported the Women's Suffrage League throughout their campaign and frequently spoke at its meetings, and that of women's suffrage organisations in the United Kingdom. He chaired the league's final meeting as well as its celebration event when suffrage was granted.

Cockburn and Frederick Holder convinced the reluctant Premier Charles Kingston that by giving the vote to women they would be so grateful that they would vote for him.

He continued to play a part in women's suffrage upon his return to London and, along with his wife, was active in the suffragette movement in England.

== Later life ==
After resigning from parliament, he went to England to serve as Agent-General for South Australia. He resigned in 1901 when the position was downgraded (due to federation), but remained in London and unofficially represented South Australia and Australia in many things.

In 1912, Cockburn was appointed as the Australian federal government's official representative at the First International Eugenics Conference in London. He had previously corresponded with eugenics pioneer Francis Galton.

He had a long career in Freemasonry that began with his initiation in 1876. He would go on to help establish the Grand Lodge of South Australia and to serve in several high offices within it. After his return to England, he founded a new lodge in London and served as president of the International Masonic Club. As a Masonic Rosicrucian he was attracted to esoteric and philosophical subjects, and published several dozen articles exploring such themes in various Masonic periodicals.

He was created Knight Commander of the Order of St Michael and St George (KCMG) in the 1900 New Year Honours list on 1 January 1900, and received the order from Queen Victoria during an investiture at Windsor Castle on 1 March 1900. He was appointed a Knight of Grace of the Order of the Hospital of St. John of Jerusalem in England (KGStJ) in August 1901.

He died in London in 1929 without ever returning to Australia. His wife, son and daughter survived him.

== Works ==
- "Imperialism and Australian Conditions" . The Empire and the century. London: John Murray. 1905. pp. 446–461.

Civic offices
Preceded by New position	Mayor of Jamestown; 1878–1881	Succeeded by Hillary Boucaut
Parliament of South Australia
Preceded by Ebenezer Ward	Member of Parliament for Burra; 1884–1887; Served alongside: Ben Rounsevell	Succeeded by Frederick Holder
Preceded by Lancelot Stirling	Member of Parliament for Mount Barker; 1887–1898; Served alongside: Albert Landseer	Succeeded by Charles Dumas
Political offices
Preceded by John Downer	Leader of the Opposition of South Australia; 1889	Succeeded by Thomas Playford II
Preceded by Thomas Playford II	Premier of South Australia; 1889–1890	Succeeded by Thomas Playford II
Preceded by James Ramsay	Chief Secretary of South Australia; 1889–1890	Succeeded by John Bray
Diplomatic posts
Preceded by Thomas Playford II	Agent-General for South Australia; 1898–1901	Succeeded by Henry Allerdale Grainger
