= Corporate Town of Peterborough =

Local government area in South Australia

Coordinates: 32°58′S 138°50′E

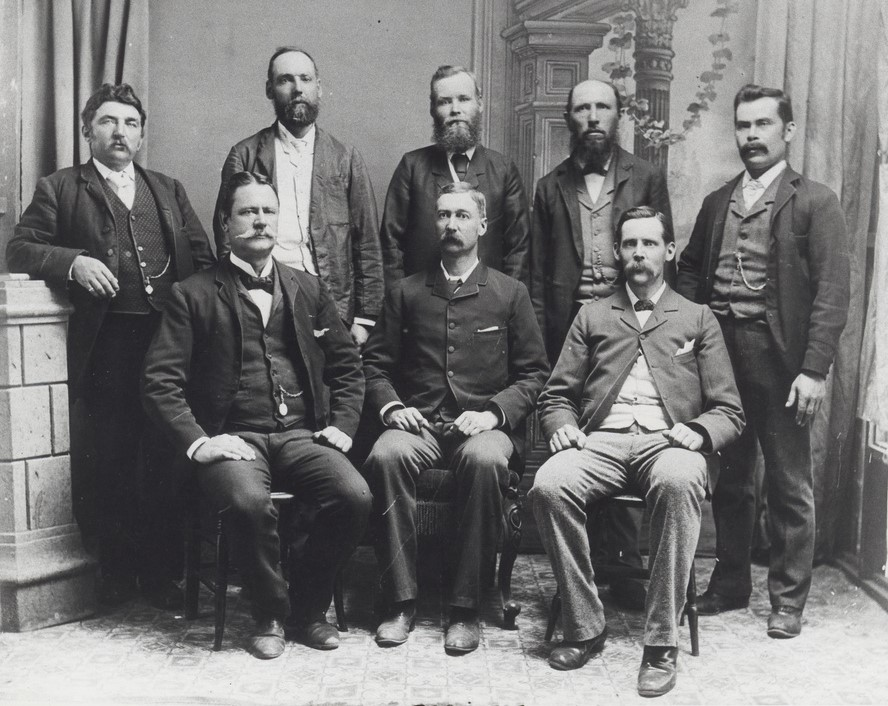
Corporate Town of Peterborough council, c. 1901

The Corporate Town of Peterborough was a local government area in South Australia centred on the town of Peterborough. It came into existence on 7 October 1886 when it separated from the surrounding District Council of Yongala. It was initially known as Petersburg; it was renamed Peterborough on 10 January 1918, one of many South Australian places to be renamed as a consequence of World War I. It gained additional sections from the Yongala council on 30 August 1888 and 25 November 1897, but lost some territory in 1935 when Yongala amalgamated with the adjacent District Council of Coglin to create the District Council of Peterborough. The two municipalities would coexist alongside each other, the town surrounded by the district council, for more than sixty years.

The council acquired the Petersburg Institute building on Main Street for a town hall in 1894; it survives today but has been converted to residential use. It built the current Peterborough Town Hall next door in 1927; the large, ornate building is heritage-listed and now serves as the seat of its successor municipality. In 1913, the council decided to institute a municipal electric supply; the subsequent plant was extended several times, and in 1936 was described as "the most up-to-date outside [Adelaide], with the exception of Port Pirie". In 1986, ownership of the rolling stock of the Steamtown Peterborough Railway Preservation Society was vested in the council by the Parliament of South Australia following a parliamentary inquiry.

The Corporate Town of Peterborough ceased to exist in 1997, when it amalgamated into the surrounding District Council of Peterborough.

== Mayors ==
- William Threadgold (1886–1889)
- H. Howard (1889–1891)
- Edwin Palmer (1891–1892)
- W. Heithersay (1892–1893)
- E. J. Elliot (1894–1895)
- Edwin Palmer (1896–1898)
- B. Roennfeldt (1898–1899)
- T. H. Chinner (1899–1900)
- G. W. Halcombe (1900–1902)
- J. W. Bowering (1902–1905)
- W. A. Casley (1905–1906)
- Samuel Dickson (1906–1908)
- W. Butterworth (1908–1912)
- M. Birks (1912–1913)
- J. C. Todd (1913–1914)
- Alex Jamieson (1914–1917)
- Samuel Daniel Jones (1917–1920)
- H. P. Shakes (1920–1921)
- C. H. Clarke (1921–1922)
- G. Phillips (1922–1924)
- John William Clair (1924–1925)
- W. C. Reed (1925–1926)
- E. Hoile (1926–1927)
- Samuel Daniel Jones (1927–1940)
- Richard John (Jack) Bowden (1940–1945)
- Ernest Harold Fowler (1945-1962)
- Maxwell Edward Hams (1962-1974)
- Robert Edward Goudie (1974)
- David Thomas Dowd (1974-1979)
- Kevin Vincent Rucioch (1974–1991)
