= Hundred of Yangya =

Hundred of South Australia

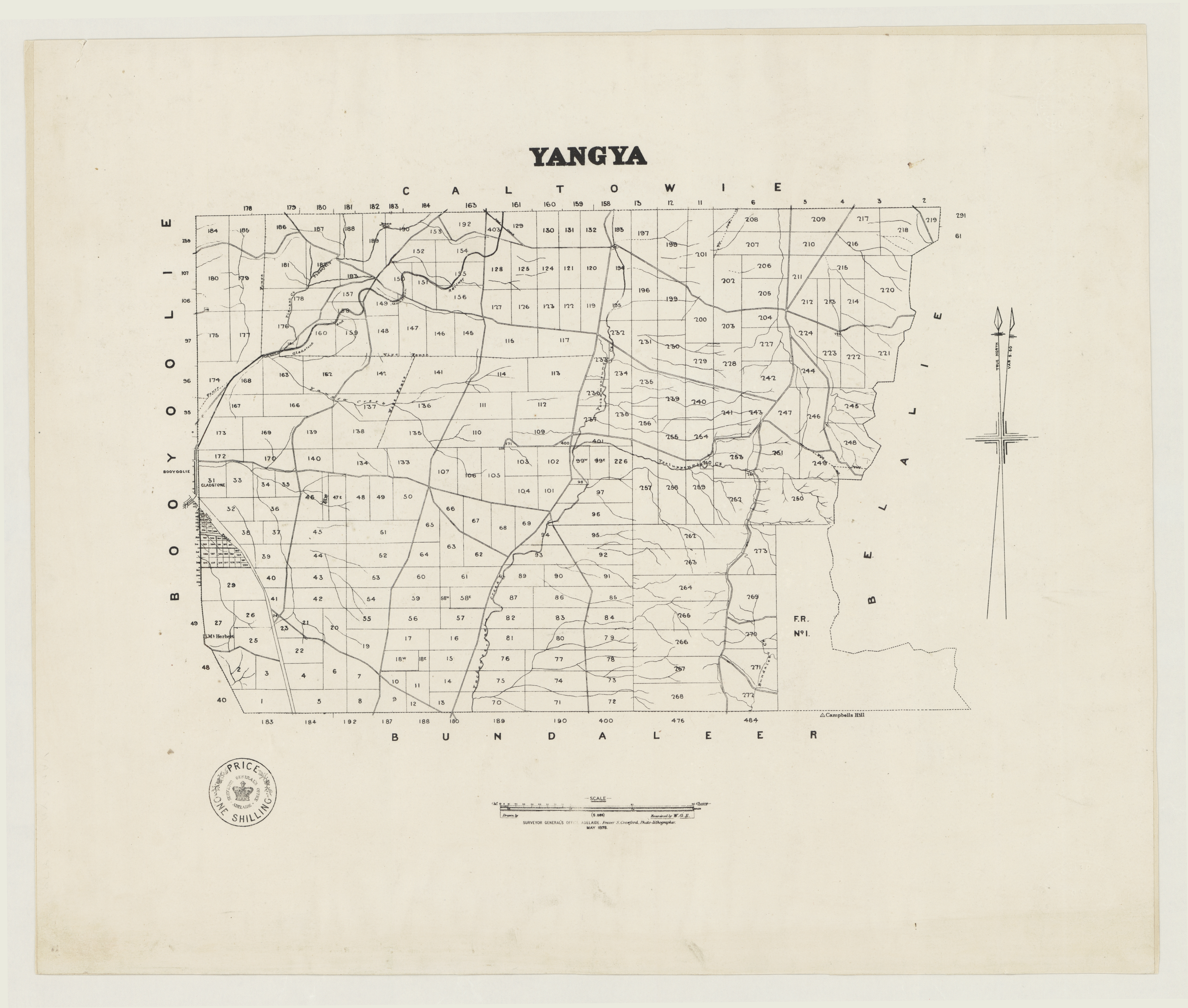
File:Hundred of Yangya, 1878

The Hundred of Yangya is a cadastral unit of hundred in the County of Victoria, South Australia straddling the towns and localities of Gladstone, Caltowie, West Bundaleer and Georgetown.

According to South Australian history, Geoffrey Manning, Yangya is an indigenous term meaning "wide place".

== History ==
The hundred was proclaimed on 15 July 1869. The Yangya School, near Gladstone, was opened in 1878 probably "to serve the miners and railway workers operating the Siberian Flux Quarry". It closed in 1923, but the building "continued in use as the local Methodist Church until 1954."

The town of Gladstone was privately laid east of the railway line in 1872 on section 31 of the hundred.
