= County of Victoria =

Victoria
- Cadastral division
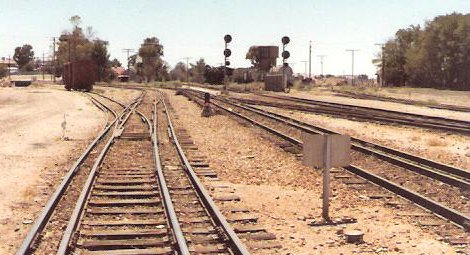
- Rail yard at Gladstone in the county's centre on the boundary of the hundreds of Booyoolie and Yangya

- Coordinates: 33°17′17″S 138°23′59″E
- Country: Australia
- State: South Australia
- LGA(s): Port Pirie Northern Areas Goyder
- Established: 1 October 1857

Area
  - Total: 3,710 km^{2} (1,431 sq mi)
Lands administrative divisions around Victoria
Spencer Gulf	Frome; Dalhousie	Kimberley
Spencer Gulf	Victoria	Kimberley; Burra
Spencer Gulf	Stanley; Daly	Burra

The County of Victoria is one of the 49 cadastral counties of South Australia. It was proclaimed by Governor Richard MacDonnell in 1857 and probably named for Queen Victoria. It covers an area of the Spencer Gulf coast and hinterland in the Mid North of the state from Port Pirie in the northwest to near Mount Bryan in the southeast, including most of the Broughton River watershed.

== Hundreds ==
The county is divided into the following 14 hundreds:

- Hundred of Pirie, established 1874
- Hundred of Wandearah, established 1874
- Hundred of Napperby, established 1874
- Hundred of Crystal Brook, established 1871
- Hundred of Howe, established 1891 (southern part of Wirrabara Forest Reserve)
- Hundred of Booyoolie, established 1871
- Hundred of Narridy, established 1871
- Hundred of Caltowie, established 1871
- Hundred of Yangya, established 1869
- Hundred of Bundaleer, established 1869
- Hundred of Belalie, established 1870
- Hundred of Reynolds, established 1869
- Hundred of Whyte, established 1869
- Hundred of Anne, established 1863
