= Hundred of Reynolds =

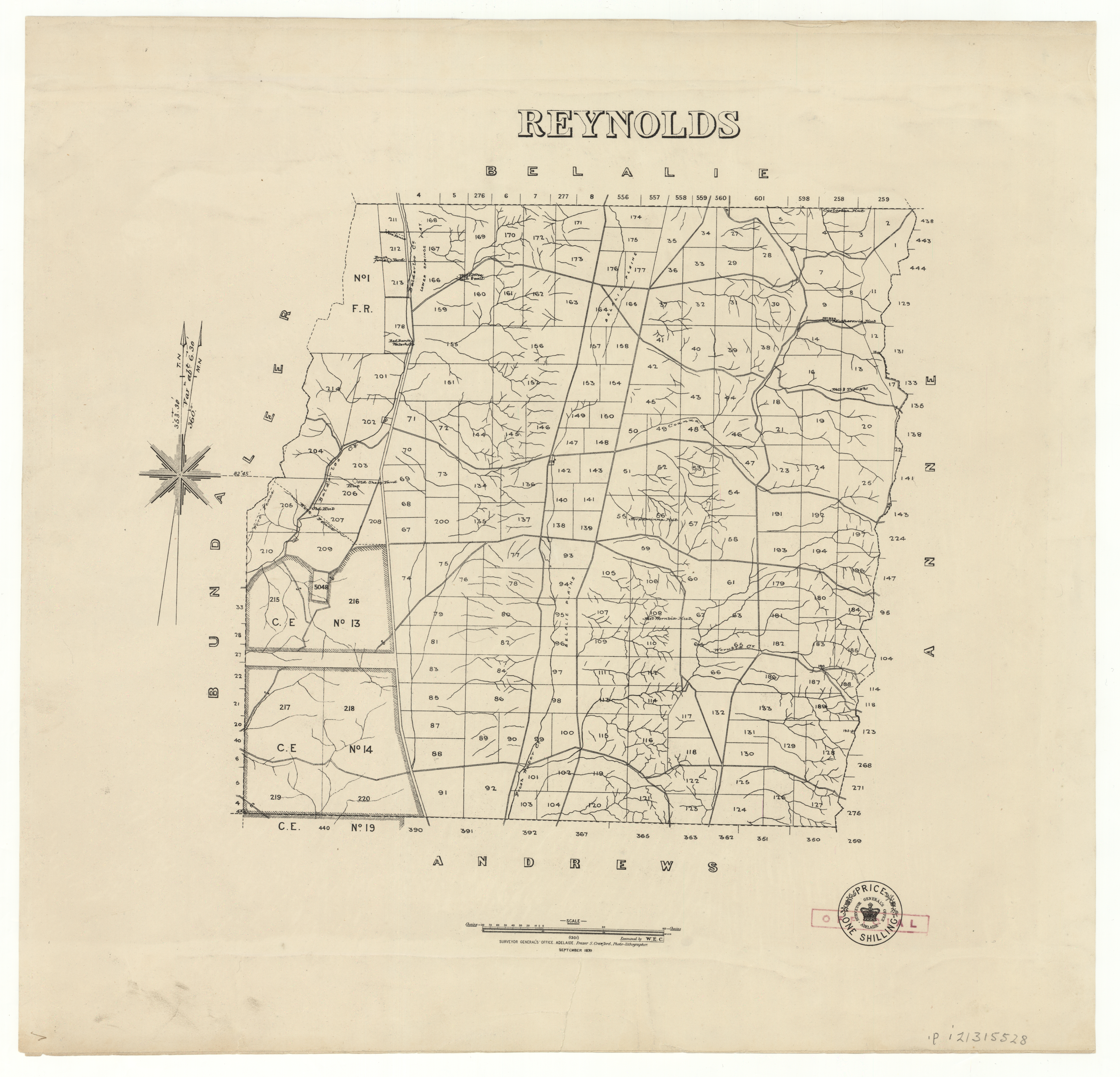
Hundred of Reynolds, 1879

The Hundred of Reynolds is a cadastral hundred of the County of Victoria, South Australia.
