= Hundred of Morgan =

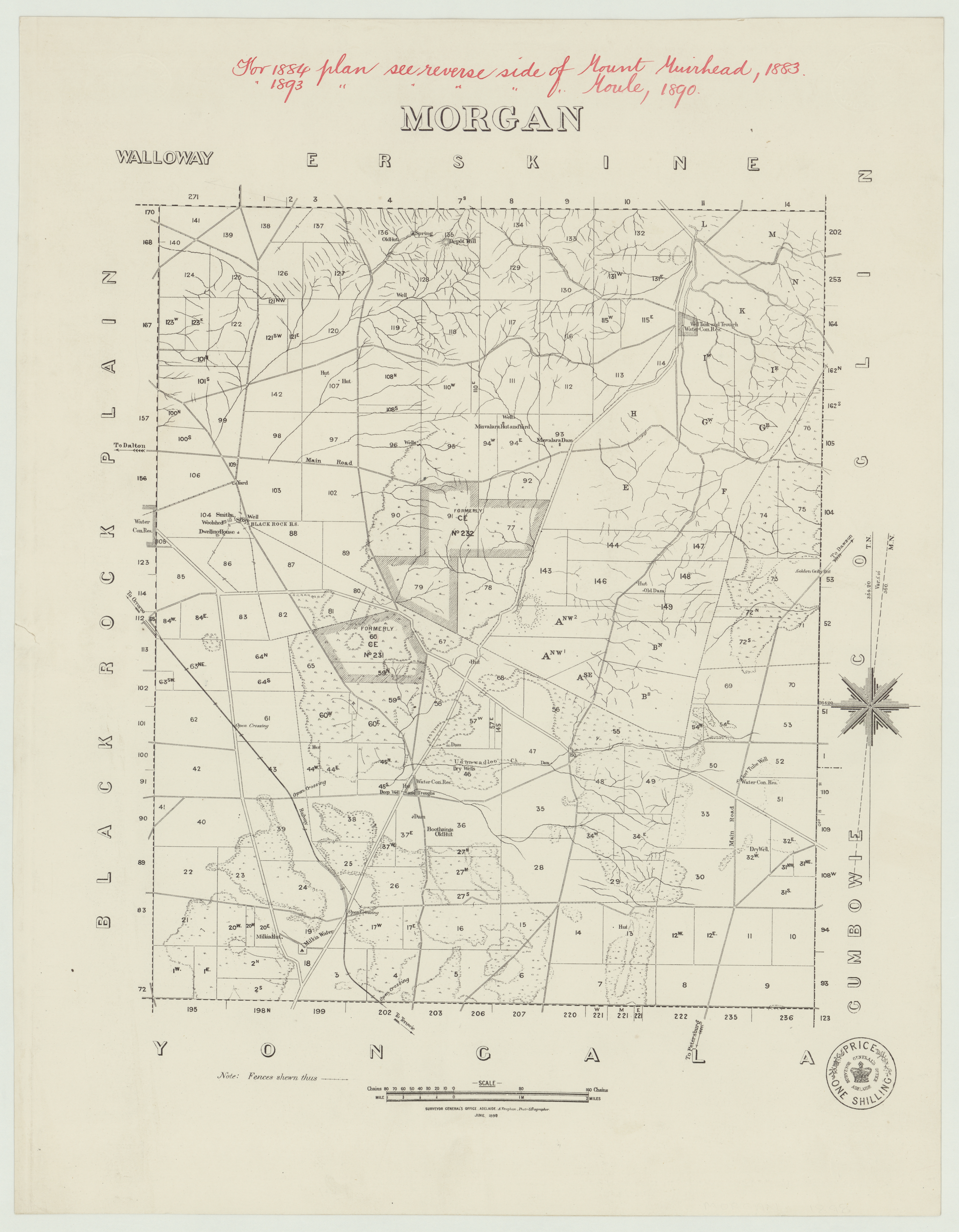
Hundred of Morgan, 1898

The Hundred of Morgan is a hundred in the County of Dalhousie, South Australia. The hundred was established 1876 but has no townships.
