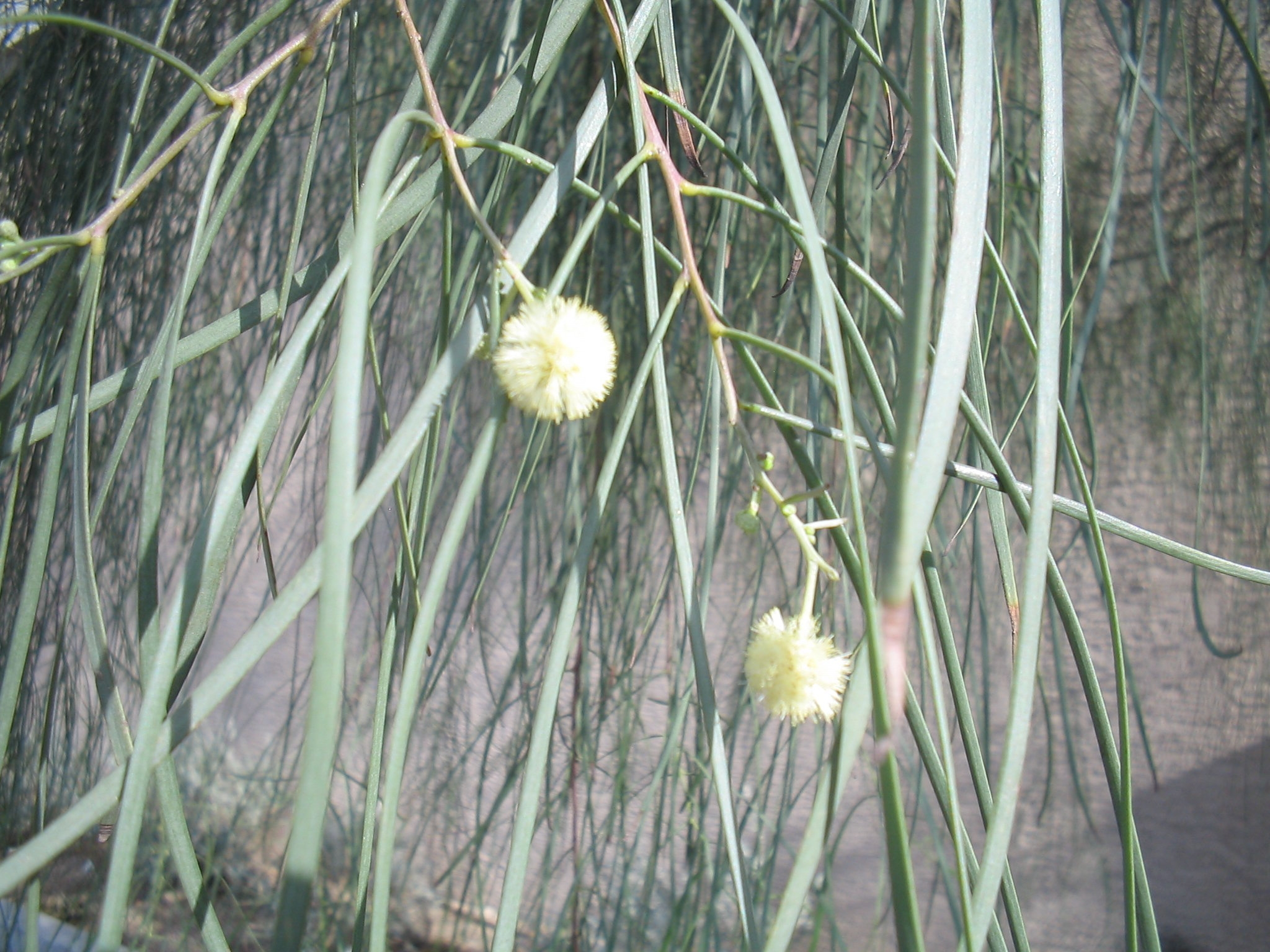

Scientific classification
- Kingdom: Plantae
- Clade: Tracheophytes
- Clade: Angiosperms
- Clade: Eudicots
- Clade: Rosids
- Order: Fabales
- Family: Fabaceae
- Subfamily: Caesalpinioideae
- Clade: Mimosoid clade
- Genus: Acacia
- Species: A. stenophylla

Binomial name
- Acacia stenophylla A.Cunn. ex Benth.
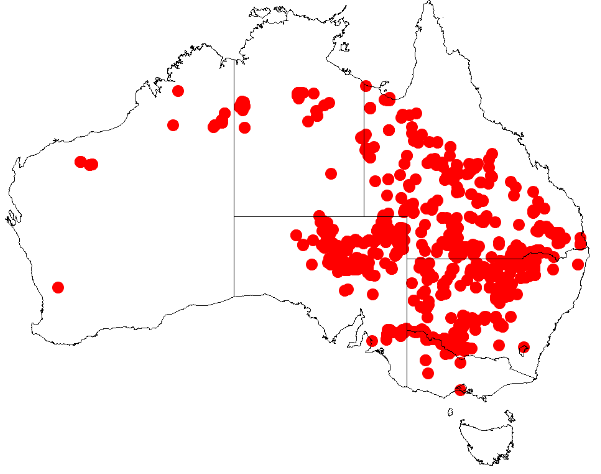
- Occurrence data from AVH

Synonyms
- Acacia stenophylla Benth. var. linearis Maiden; Racosperma stenophyllum (Benth.) Pedley

= Acacia stenophylla =

Species of tree

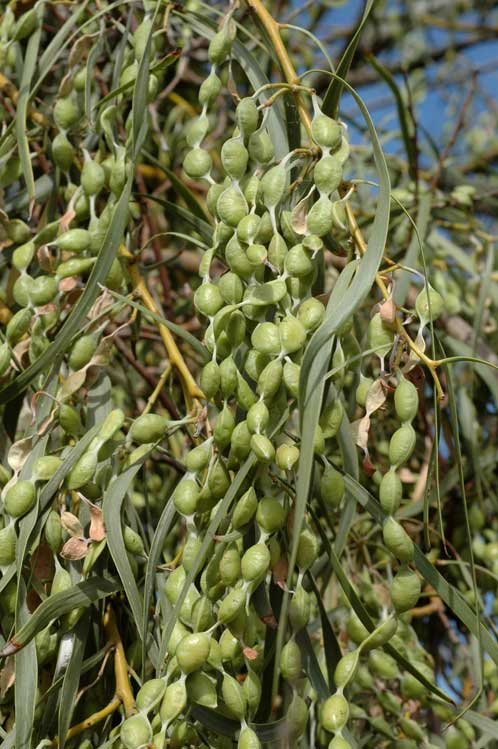
Fruit

Acacia stenophylla, commonly referred to as the shoestring acacia, is an evergreen tree in the family Fabaceae and native to Australia. It is not considered rare or endangered.

== Description ==
Acacia stenophylla varies in characteristic and size from a rounded, multi-stemmed shrub to a spreading tree. A. stenophylla grows from 4–20 m (13–66 ft) tall, often stemming into branches at the trunk from about 1 m (3.3 ft). Bark is dark-grey to blackish and rough, branchlets are smooth to sericeous and sometimes angular.

The phyllodes are strap-like, 15–40 cm (5.9–15.7 in) long, 2–10 mm (0.08–0.4 in) wide, straight to slightly curved, slightly rough, free from hair or very finely puberulous, acute to acuminate, apex is often strongly curved. Veins are copious and closely parallel.

The racemes are 3– to 5-headed, with stems 2–15 mm (0.08–0.6 in) long, which are slightly rough or with appressed minute hairs. The peduncles are 6–13 mm (0.2–0.5 in) long. The flower heads are creamy-white to pale yellow in colour, spherical and 6–9 mm (0.2–0.4 in) in diameter. Flowers are pentamerous, with sepals three-quarters united.

The pods are moniliform, up to 26 cm (10 in) long, 8–12 mm (0.3–0.5 in) wide, woody-leathery textured, smooth except micro-puberulous between seeds. The seeds are longitudinal, elliptic, 7–9 mm (0.3–0.4 in) long, dark brown, lacking an aril, funicle enlarged, are folded at the seed apex. Flowering time is often irregular, although mainly occurring in autumn.

A. stenophylla is highly salt tolerant and moderately frost and drought tolerant. The average minimum annual rainfall that the tree needs is around 400 mm (16 in) per year.

== Reproduction and dispersal ==
Acacia stenophylla normally flowers from March to August, although it can flower irregularly throughout the year. Seed pods turn woody as they mature from October to December and produce approximately 6–12 viable seeds/g.

A. stenophylla seeds germinate prolifically. After major floods, seedlings can often be present along the flood-line, but only a very small proportion of these persist.

== Taxonomy ==
Acacia stenophylla belongs to the genus Acacia, comprising 1200 species worldwide. 900 of these species are endemic to Australia.

== Common names ==
Common names used in Australia include Balkura, Belalie, black wattle, Dalby myall, Dalby wattle, Dunthy, Eumong, Gooralee, Gurley, ironwood, Munumula, native willow, river cooba, and river myall.

== Etymology ==
The specific epithet is derived from the Greek stenos (narrow) and phyllon (leaf), meaning 'with narrow leaves'.

== Distribution ==
Acacia stenophylla is predominantly distributed in central and eastern Australia.

A. stenophylla is found from the Murray River in South Australia and Victoria through western New South Wales, Northern Territory, and Queensland, with a small population also occurring in Western Australia.

It mainly occurs from latitude 23° to 33° S with a range from 17° to 36°S. In altitude, it mainly occurs between 50 and 325 m ASL with a range from near sea level to 625 m.

== Ecology ==
=== Climate ===
Acacia stenophylla is most commonly found in a warm arid climatic zone. A. stenophylla tends to grow to a larger size in semiarid climates, which exist in New South Wales and Queensland. The species also expands into the sub-humid zone in Queensland.

Disregarding the species' far southern distribution, the mean maximum temperature of the warmest month is 35–38 °C and the mean minimum of the coolest month 4–7 °C. There are, on average, about 110–130 days per year over 32 °C and 15–50 days over 38 °C.

A. stenophylla is subject to 1–20 heavy frosts per year, and withstands a variable rainfall frequency. Rainfall is often augmented by groundwater or periodic flooding.

=== Physiography and soils ===
Acacia stenophylla is common throughout the Interior Lowlands physiographic division. It is often present on plains and gentle slopes and is common on the banks of watercourses, river flood plains, and depressions. The soils are predominantly fine-textured alluvials, red sandy clay and grey cracking clays. Soils often have a high pH and may be more saline in the lower horizons.

=== Vegetation type ===
Acacia stenophylla occurs in ribbon-like stands along watercourses, often as a part of eucalyptus dominated open-forest, woodland or low woodland. The species can be present in the understorey, often with Acacia salicina and Acacia pendula. It can also occur alongside Eucalyptus populnea and Casuarina cristata, but commonly grows independently alongside watercourses in semiarid areas.

=== Utilisation and uses ===
Acacia stenophylla is rarely utilised by cattle, but it is palatable to sheep. Seeds and pods of A. stenophylla were roasted and used by Indigenous Australians as a food source.

The plant is said to contain medicinal alkaloids.

A. stenophylla is widely planted as a drought tolerant and decumbent ornamental tree. It is cultivated by plant nurseries, and used in modernist gardens and in public landscapes in the Southwestern United States and California.

== Gallery ==
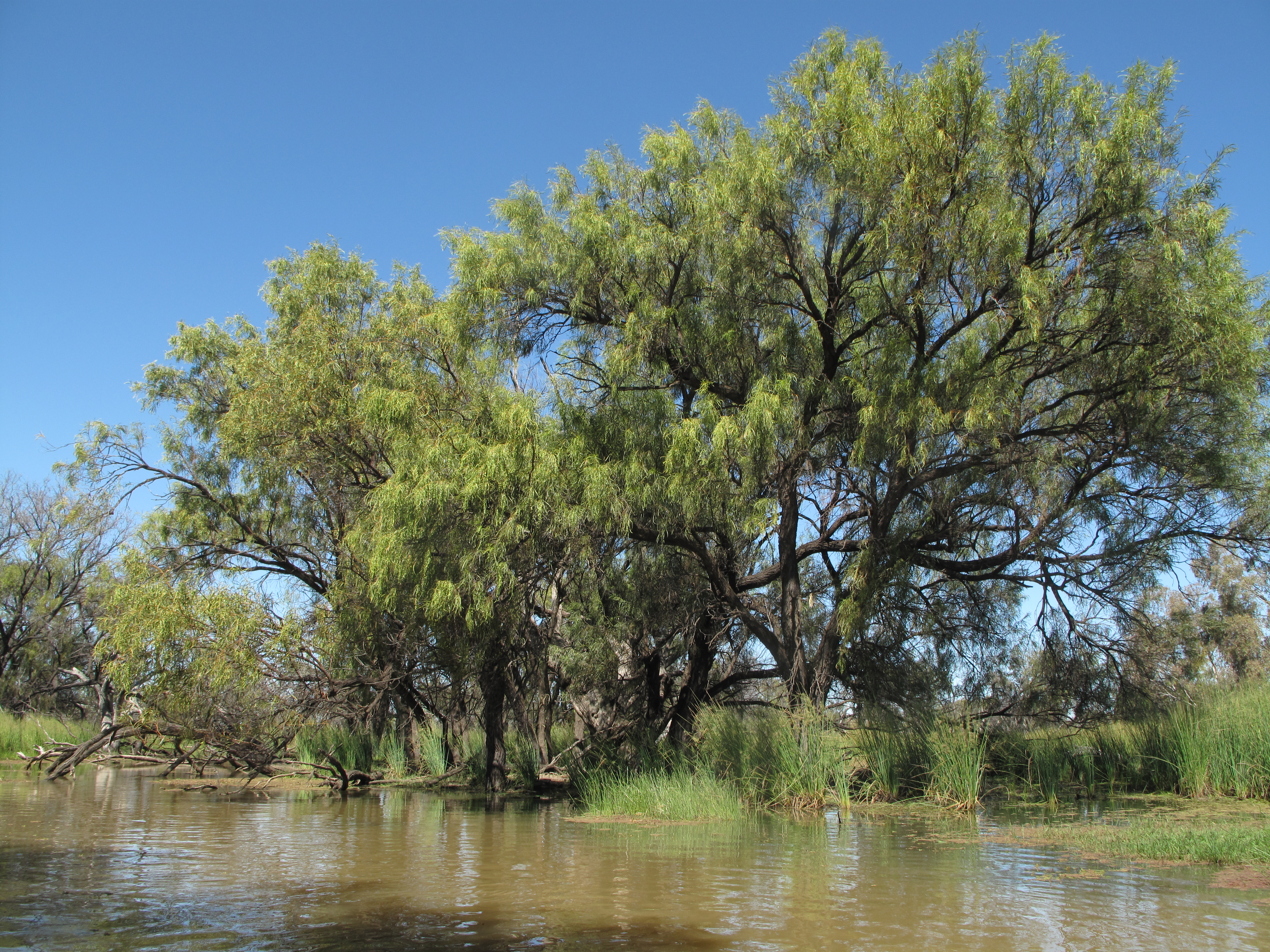
Acacia stenophylla, Macquarie Marshes

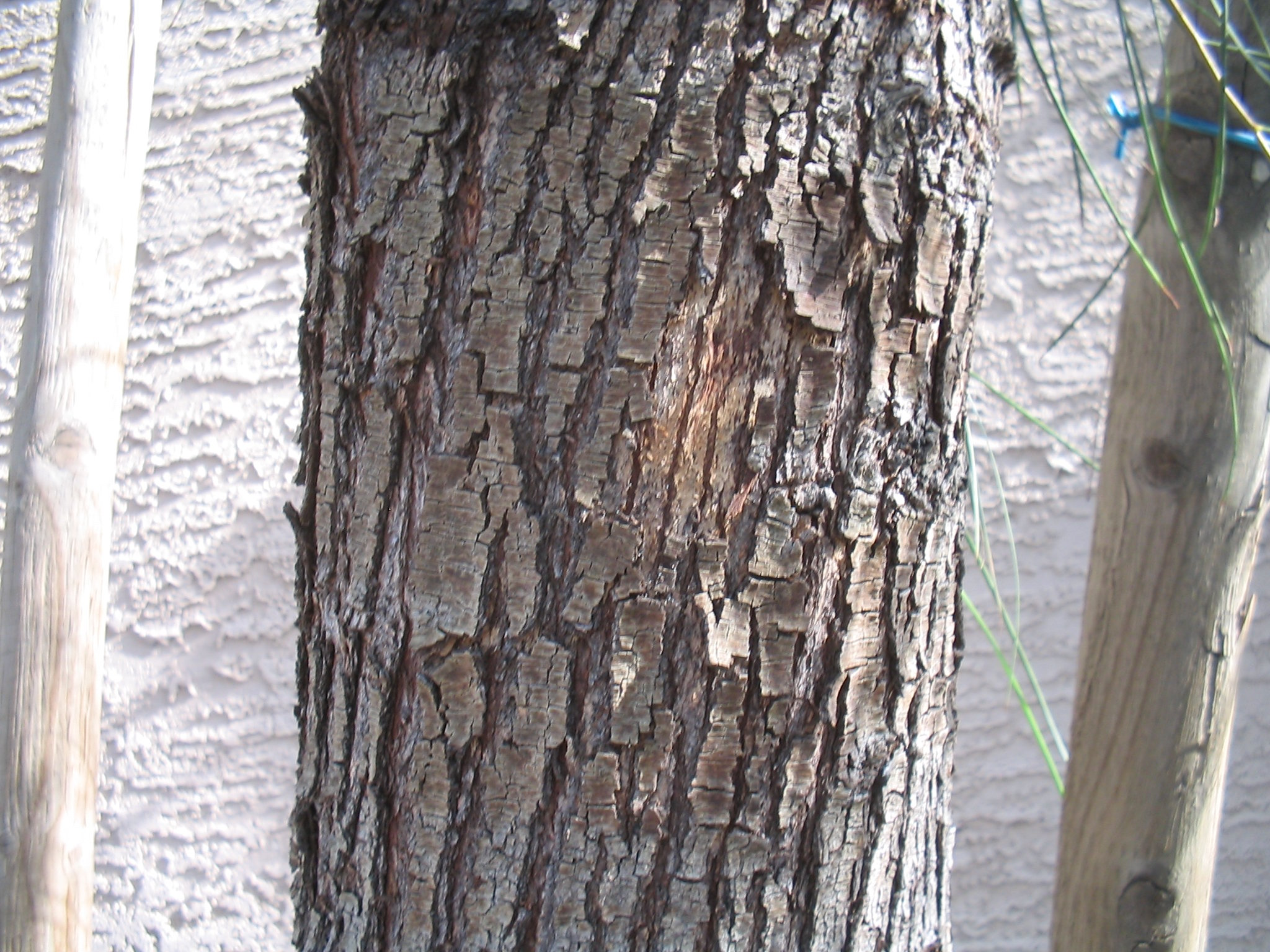
Bark

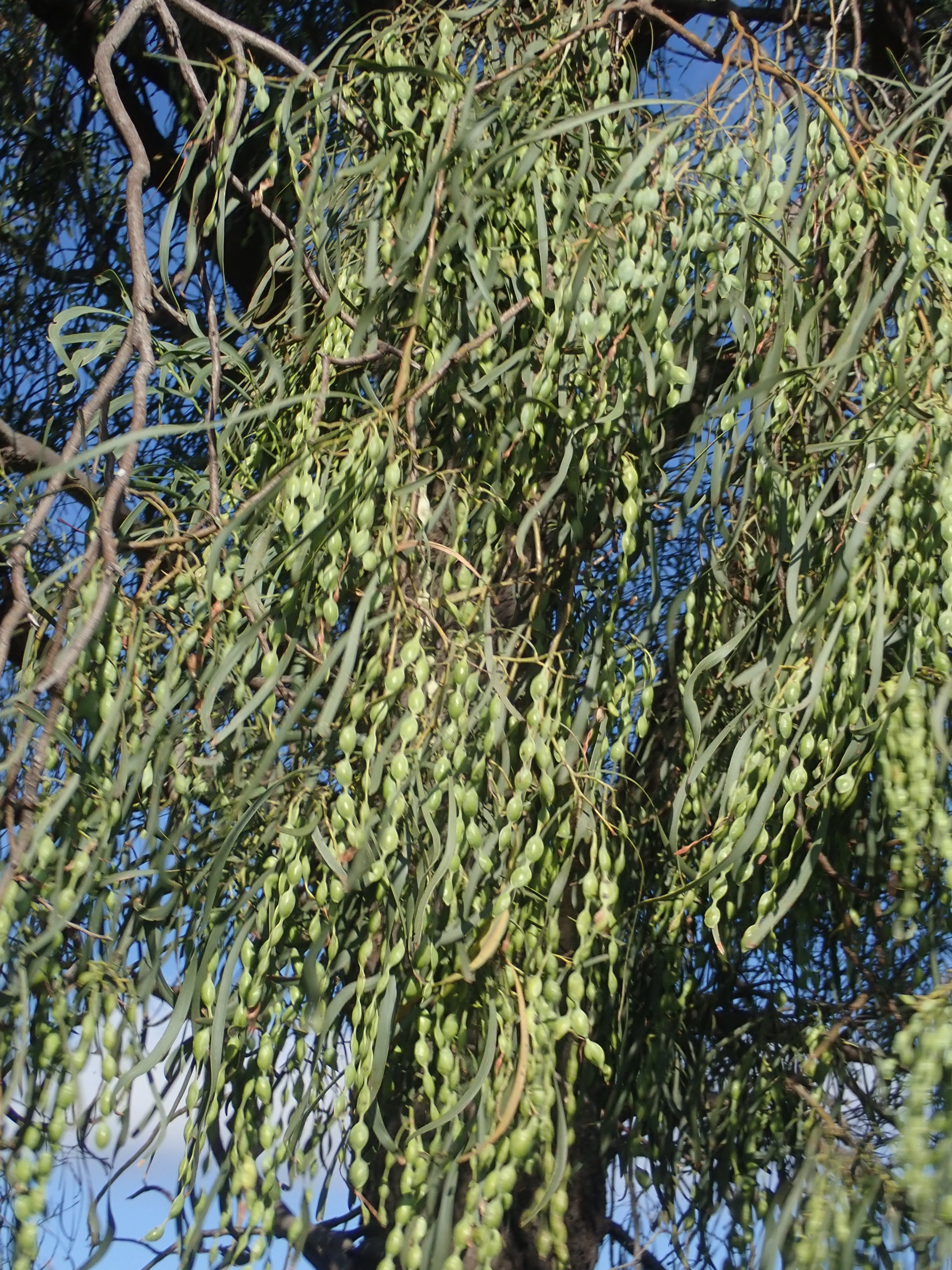
Seed pods, south of Moree
