= District Council of Jamestown =

Local government area in South Australia

Coordinates: 33°12′19″S 138°36′7″E

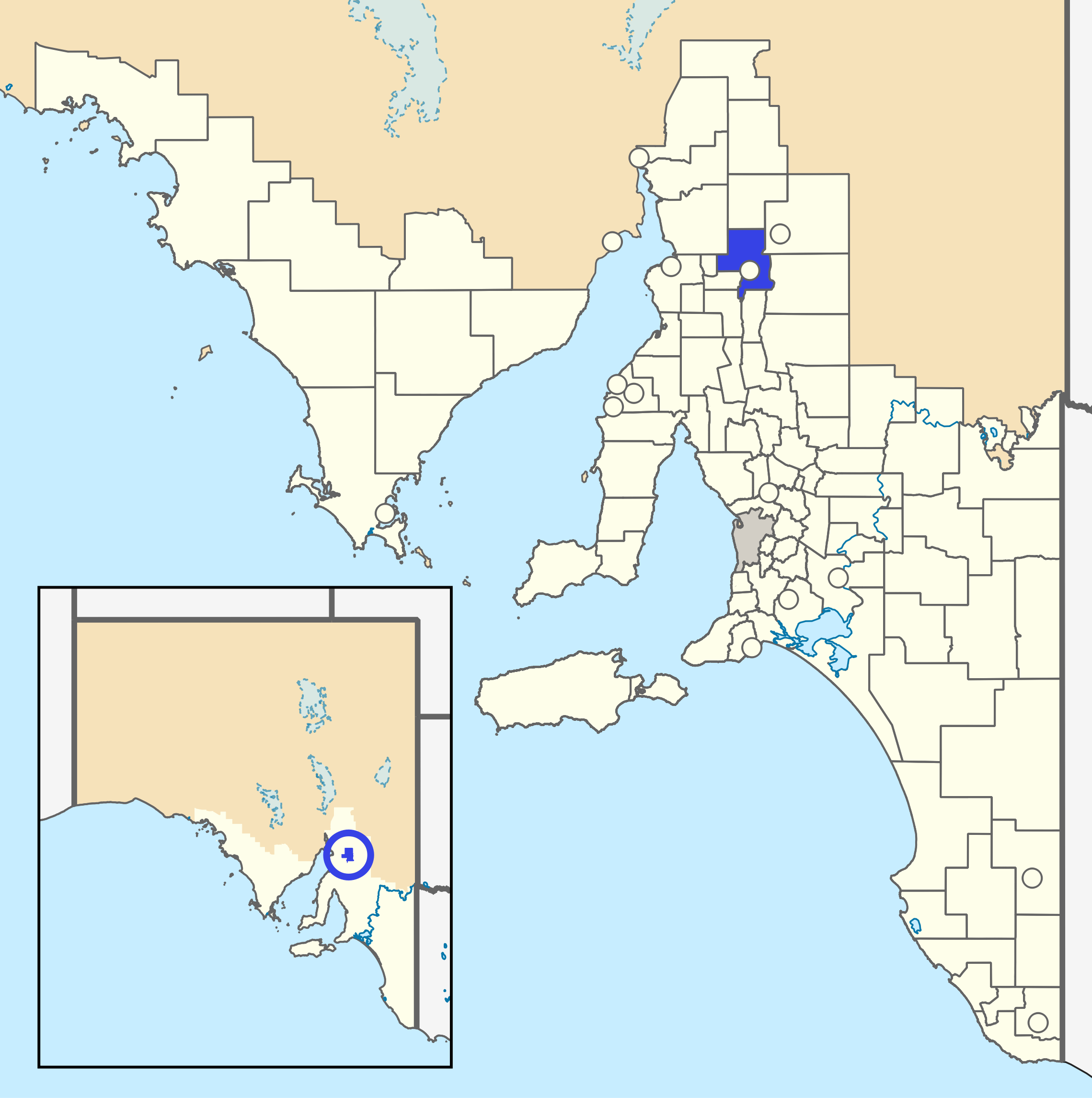
The District Council of Jamestown (blue) as it was in 1970, prior to absorbing the Corporate Town of Jamestown (marked by a circle)

The District Council of Jamestown was a local government area in South Australia, centred on the region surrounding the town of Jamestown. The District Council came into existence on 21 March 1935 following the amalgamation of 95% of the District Council of Belalie with the District Council of Caltowie and the Hundred of Mannanarie, which had been in the abolished District Council of Yongala. For almost all of its history, it surrounded but did not include the town of Jamestown itself; the Jamestown township had separated from Belalie as the Corporate Town of Jamestown in 1878, and would not merge back into the broader municipality until 1991.

The council's primary towns were Caltowie, Tarcowie, and the fringes of Jamestown, with the remainder of the municipality entirely rural. It was responsible for sealing many of the major roads within its boundaries. The new council initially occupied the former District Council of Belalie office in Ayr Street, Jamestown, which dated from 1900. In 1957, the council demolished the small former Belalie office and built new offices. The new council offices were extended and further renovated in 1980. In 1975, it published a local history, Changing Boundaries – a history of 100 years of local government in the area in 1975 by L. T. Cooper.

The District Council of Jamestown expanded significantly in 1991, when it merged with the Corporate Town of Jamestown and absorbed Jamestown itself. However, it ceased to exist six years later, when it merged with the District Council of Rocky River and the District Council of Spalding to create the present Northern Areas Council on 3 May 1997.

== Chairmen ==
- Herbert Frederick (Herb) Jones (1935–1937)
- Michael James Cronin (1937–1947)
- Mervyn Holland (1947–1959)
- Ralph William Napper (1959–1962)
- John Kevin Kerin (1962–1966)
- Michael Clement Meaney (1966–1968)
- Frank Leslie Crossman (1968–1977)
