= Hundred of Bundaleer =

The Hundred of Bundaleer is a cadastral unit of hundred located in the Mid North of South Australia in the approach to the lower Flinders Ranges. It is one of the hundreds of the County of Victoria and is named for Bundaleer Station of South Australia.

== See also ==
- Bundaleer North, South Australia, nearby rural locality
