= District Council of Belalie =

- Local government area
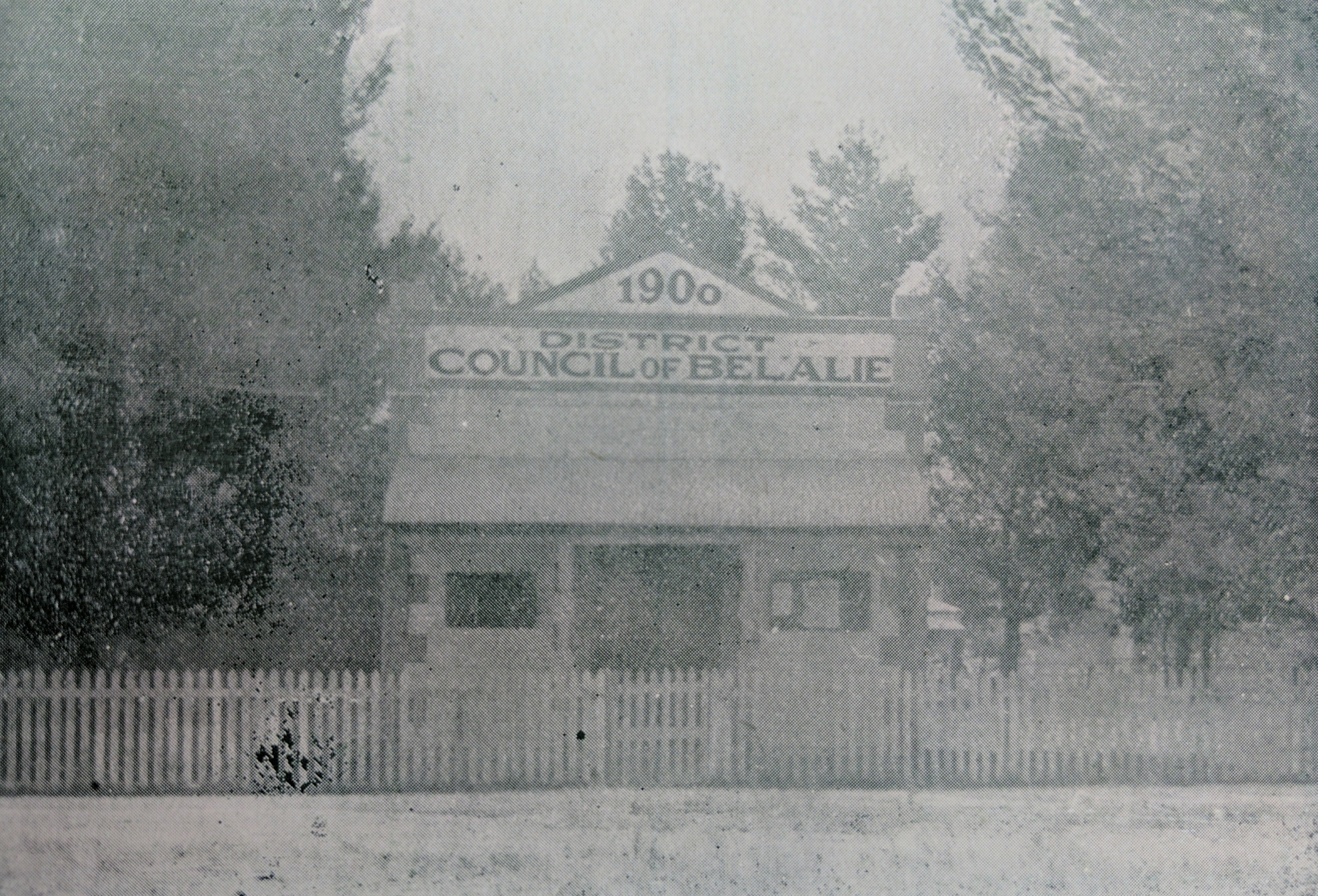
- District Council of Belalie office

- Coordinates: 33°12′19″S 138°36′7″E
- Country: Australia
- State: South Australia
- Established: 1875
- Abolished: 1935
- Council seat: Jamestown

Population
  - Total: 1,184 (1923)

The District Council of Belalie was a local government area in South Australia. It was proclaimed on 11 November 1875, and initially comprised most of the cadastral Hundred of Belalie, including its central town of Jamestown. Jamestown itself had originally been planned to be named Belalie when surveyed; while the town had been renamed, the Belalie name was retained for the council. It was divided into five wards at its inception (Centre, North-West, North-East, South-West and South-East) with one councillor each, the first councillors for each being appointed by proclamation. The South-East and South-West wards had been replaced by the Yarcowie and Yongala wards by 1893.

On 25 July 1878, the town of Jamestown was severed from the Belalie council with the creation of the Corporate Town of Jamestown, leaving Belalie as an entirely rural municipality with no towns within its boundaries. It gained the Hundred of Whyte and the remnant rural portions of the Hundred of Belalie under the District Councils Act 1887. The council continued to be based in Jamestown, although it was no longer part of the municipality, and built new offices in Ayr Street in 1900.

In 1923, the council represented a pastoral and agricultural district of 124,629 acres, also including the Government Forest Reserve at Bundaleer North. In that year, it had a population of 1,184, 292 of them ratepayers, residing in 259 dwellings, with the capital value of ratable property being £455,560. The municipality gained an area around Bundaleer Springs from the District Council of Gladstone on 16 July 1925. The council ceased to exist on 21 March 1935: the vast majority of Belalie amalgamated with the District Council of Caltowie and the Hundred of Mannanarie from the abolished District Council of Yongala to form the new District Council of Jamestown, while a small section of Belalie merged into the District Council of Hallett.

== Chairmen of the District Council of Belalie ==
- James Neale (1889–1890)
- Patrick Ward (1895)
- Thomas Williams (1897)
- William Glasson (1900–1903)
- James Neale (1903–1906)
- William Gilfillan (1916–1921)
- Peter Francis Noonan (1922–1923)
- Edmund Thomas Daly (1923–1925)
- Harry Kenton Moore (1925–1926)
