= Hundred of Whyte =

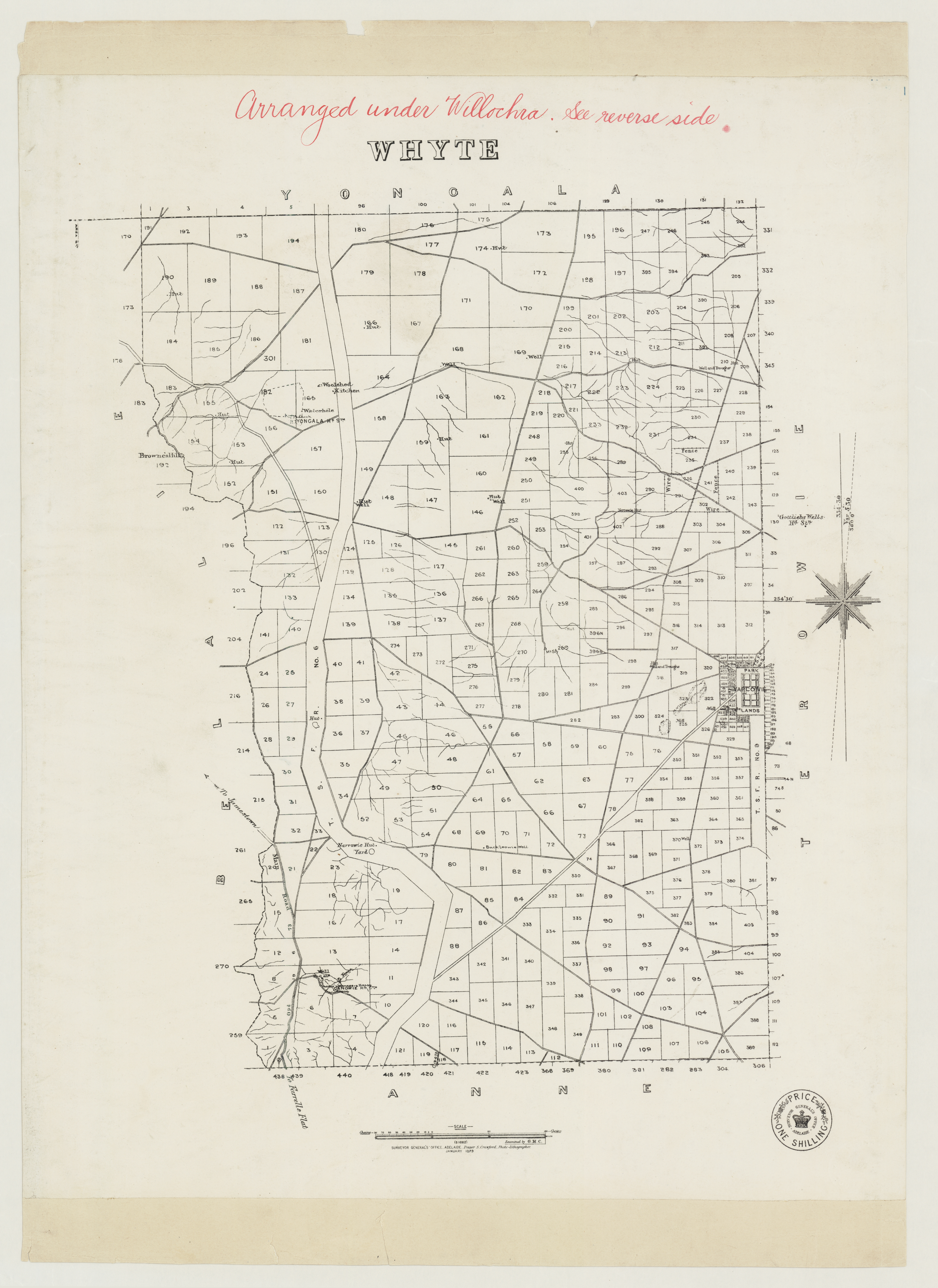
Hundred of Whyte, 1879

The Hundred of Whyte is a cadastral unit of hundred located in the Mid North of South Australia in the approach to the lower Flinders Ranges. It is one of the hundreds of the County of Victoria.

It is named for John Whyte (pastoralist).

== See also ==
- Whyte Yarcowie, South Australia
