= Yongala, South Australia =

Yongala
- Town
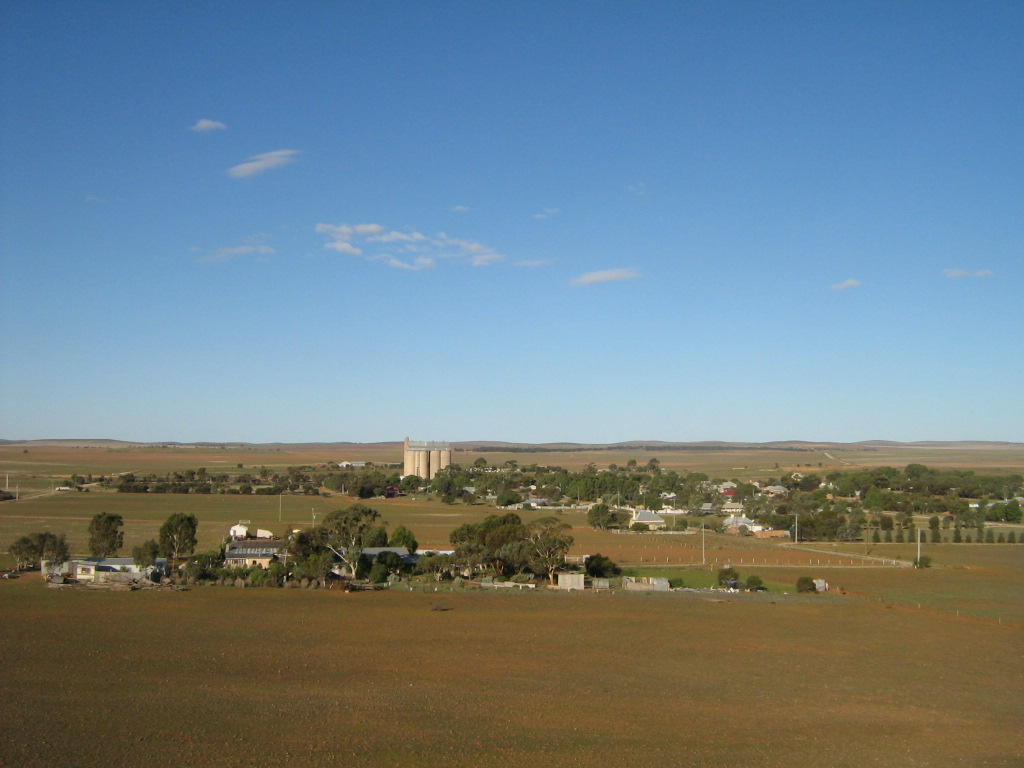
- Scene from the hill overlooking Yongala

- Coordinates: 33°02′0″S 138°45′0″E
- Country: Australia
- State: South Australia
- LGA: District Council of Peterborough
- Location: 238 km (148 mi) North of Adelaide via; 91 km (57 mi) East of Port Pirie; 11 km (6.8 mi) southwest of Peterborough

Government
  - State electorate: Stuart
  - Federal division: Grey
- Elevation: 521 m (1,709 ft)

Population
  - Total: 67 (SAL 2021)
- Postcode: 5493
- County: Dalhousie
- Mean max temp: 21.9 °C (71.4 °F)
- Mean min temp: 7.3 °C (45.1 °F)
- Annual rainfall: 365.7 mm (14.40 in)
Localities around Yongala
Mannanarie	Sunnybrae	Sunnybrae
Mannanarie	Yongala	Sunnybrae
Sunnybrae	Sunnybrae	Sunnybrae

Yongala is a small town located in the state of South Australia, Australia, and is located along on the Clare-Peterborough Road (B79), 238 km (148 mi) from Adelaide, the state capital.

== Etymology ==
According to the Manning index, the name comes from an Aboriginal phrase yongla-cowie — "good water place", although he gives another reading as "brother". Suggestions that it could mean "broad water" may be discounted.

== History ==
The Hundred of Yongala was proclaimed in the County of Dalhousie in 1871, one of the first of the twelve hundreds to be declared in that county, opening up the area for closer settlement and small-scale cultivation. The town was proclaimed on 23 May 1876. Within five years there was a population of 353 as developers anticipated the connection of a railway. Instead, the railway was built through the nearby town of Peterborough.

The SS Yongala launched in 1903 and owned by the Adelaide Steamship Company was named after the town. It sank in a storm in 1911 off the coast of Townsville, Queensland and its wreck site is protected by the Underwater Cultural Heritage Act 2018.

== Geography and climate ==
Yongala has a cold semi-arid climate (Köppen BSk). It is situated on a plateau of 521 metres (1,709 ft) and winter snowfalls can occur. The town holds several records for the lowest minimum temperature in South Australia: including its all-time record low of −8.2 °C (17.2 °F) on 20 July 1976, in addition to the record low temperatures in South Australia for the months of May, June, August and September.

Climate data for Yongala (1926–2024, rainfall to 1881); 521 m AMSL; 33.03° S, 138.76° E
Month	Jan	Feb	Mar	Apr	May	Jun	Jul	Aug	Sep	Oct	Nov	Dec	Year
Record high °C (°F)	43.5 (110.3)	44.0 (111.2)	39.5 (103.1)	36.0 (96.8)	27.6 (81.7)	23.9 (75.0)	25.6 (78.1)	28.2 (82.8)	32.8 (91.0)	37.6 (99.7)	41.8 (107.2)	43.1 (109.6)	44.0 (111.2)
Mean daily maximum °C (°F)	30.9 (87.6)	30.2 (86.4)	27.2 (81.0)	22.0 (71.6)	17.1 (62.8)	13.6 (56.5)	12.9 (55.2)	14.5 (58.1)	18.1 (64.6)	22.0 (71.6)	25.8 (78.4)	28.7 (83.7)	21.9 (71.5)
Mean daily minimum °C (°F)	13.6 (56.5)	13.5 (56.3)	10.9 (51.6)	7.3 (45.1)	4.7 (40.5)	2.9 (37.2)	2.3 (36.1)	2.6 (36.7)	4.1 (39.4)	6.3 (43.3)	9.3 (48.7)	11.7 (53.1)	7.4 (45.4)
Record low °C (°F)	2.6 (36.7)	3.7 (38.7)	1.1 (34.0)	−2.5 (27.5)	−6.6 (20.1)	−8.1 (17.4)	−8.2 (17.2)	−6.0 (21.2)	−4.5 (23.9)	−3.0 (26.6)	−2.0 (28.4)	1.3 (34.3)	−8.2 (17.2)
Average precipitation mm (inches)	22.9 (0.90)	20.5 (0.81)	16.0 (0.63)	24.9 (0.98)	34.2 (1.35)	38.9 (1.53)	38.5 (1.52)	42.3 (1.67)	37.6 (1.48)	32.8 (1.29)	28.8 (1.13)	24.5 (0.96)	362.2 (14.26)
Average precipitation days (≥ 0.2mm)	3.7	3.3	3.8	5.7	9.6	11.9	13.1	12.7	9.7	8.0	6.3	5.0	92.8
Average afternoon relative humidity (%)	25	29	31	39	51	59	60	55	45	36	30	28	41
Source: Bureau of Meteorology
