= Caltowie, South Australia =

Caltowie South Australia
- Coordinates: 33.1809°S 138.4827°E
- Population: 122 (SAL 2021)
- Location: 225 km (140 mi) north of Adelaide
- LGA(s): Northern Areas Council
- State electorate(s): Stuart
- Federal division(s): Grey
Localities around Caltowie:
Appila	Hornsdale; Caltowie North	Jamestown
Caltowie West; Laura	Caltowie	Jamestown
Gladstone	West Bundaleer	Bundaleer North

Caltowie is a town in the Mid North region of South Australia. It is on the Wilkins Highway and the Crystal Brook-Broken Hill railway line between Gladstone and Jamestown.

== History ==
Caltowie was first known to European settlers as 'Carcowie' (meaning lizard's water hole), and became a popular stop for teamsters where they crossed the Yackamoorundie Creek.

The Government Town of Caltowie was surveyed in 1871 at the centre of the Hundred of Caltowie a few months after the hundred had been proclaimed.
