= Port Pirie South =

Port Pirie South Port Pirie, South Australia
- Coordinates: 33.199°S 138.030°E
- Population: 3,939 (2016 census)
- Postcode(s): 5540
- Location: 3 km (2 mi) south of Port Pirie; 225 km (140 mi) north of Adelaide
- LGA(s): Port Pirie Regional Council
- State electorate(s): Frome
- Federal division(s): Grey
Suburbs around Port Pirie South:
Port Pirie West	Port Pirie, Solomontown	Coonamia
Risdon Park	Port Pirie South	Bungama
Risdon Park South	Pirie East

Port Pirie South is a settlement in South Australia. It is a predominantly residential suburb of industrial city of Port Pirie.

The suburb began as a private subdivision of Sections 141, 142, 167 and 169 of the Hundred of Pirie. Its boundaries were established pursuant to the Geographical Names Act, 1969 in 1978. Since then, it has given up land to Coonamia in 1995 and absorbed land from Solomontown in 2013.
