= Hundred of Crystal Brook =

- Cadastral division
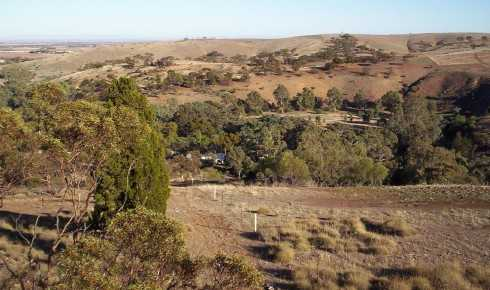
- Bowman Park, facing west, near the north boundary of the hundred

- Coordinates: 33°21′S 138°12′E
- Country: Australia
- State: South Australia
- Region: Mid North
- LGA(s): Port Pirie
- Established: 1871

Area
  - Total: 250 km^{2} (98 sq mi)
- County: Victoria
Lands administrative divisions around Hundred of Crystal Brook
Pirie	Napperby; Howe	Booyoolie
Wandearah	Crystal Brook	Narridy
Mundoora	Redhill	Koolunga

The Hundred of Crystal Brook is a cadastral unit of hundred located in the Mid North of South Australia in the approach to the lower Flinders Ranges. It is one of the hundreds of the County of Victoria and was named by Governor James Fergusson after the stream of the same name which flows east to west near the northern border of the hundred.

The town of Crystal Brook and the locality of Merriton are inside the Hundred of Crystal Brook as well as the south half of Nurom and an eastern portion of Wandearah East.

== Local government ==
The District Council of Crystal Brook was established in 1882 covering a small part of the hundred centred on the township of Crystal Brook. The hundred was fully absorbed into the council in 1888 was part of the District Councils Act 1887 along with the hundreds of Napperby and Howe, and the unincorporated portion of the Hundred of Pirie. Four years later, the council was reduced in size to cover just the Hundred of Crystal Brook and the south half of the Hundred of Napperby.

From 1988 the hundred continued to be locally governed as the Town, East and West wards of the District Council of Crystal Brook-Redhill following amalgamation of Crystal Brook and Redhill councils.

From 1997 the hundred became part of the much larger Port Pirie Regional Council following a merger between Crystal Brook-Redhill and the Port Pirie City councils.
