= Lower Broughton, South Australia =

Lower Broughton South Australia
- Coordinates: 33.33°S 137.98°E
- Population: 40 (SAL 2021)
- Established: 1995
- Postcode(s): 5522
- Time zone: ACST (UTC+9:30)
  - Summer (DST): ACST (UTC+10:30)
- Location: 186 km (116 mi) north of Adelaide city centre; 17 km (11 mi) south of Port Pirie
- LGA(s): Port Pirie Regional Council
- State electorate(s): Frome
- Federal division(s): Grey
Mean max temp	Mean min temp	Annual rainfall
22.7 °C; 73 °F	9.3 °C; 49 °F	473.3 mm 18.6 in
Suburbs around Lower Broughton:
Port Davis	Port Davis; Pirie East	Pirie East
Spencer Gulf	Lower Broughton	Nurom; Wandearah East
Wandearah West	Wandearah West; Wandearah East	Wandearah East
- Footnotes: Coordinates; Location; Climate; Adjoining localities

Lower Broughton is a locality in the Australian state of South Australia on the east coast of Spencer Gulf about 17 kilometres (11 miles) to the south of the city of Port Pirie and about 186 kilometres (116 miles) north of Adelaide city centre.

The locality was established in June 1995 in respect to “the long established name.” Its name is derived from “its proximity” to the Broughton River.

Lower Broughton occupies land between the coastline in the west and the Spencer Highway in the east around a section of the Broughton River. Land use within the locality consists of agriculture with a strip of land along the coastline being zoned for conservation.

Lower Broughton is located within the federal Division of Grey, the state electoral district of Frome and the local government area of the Port Pirie Regional Council.
