= District Council of Crystal Brook =

Former local government area of South Australia

Coordinates: 33°20′S 138°10′E

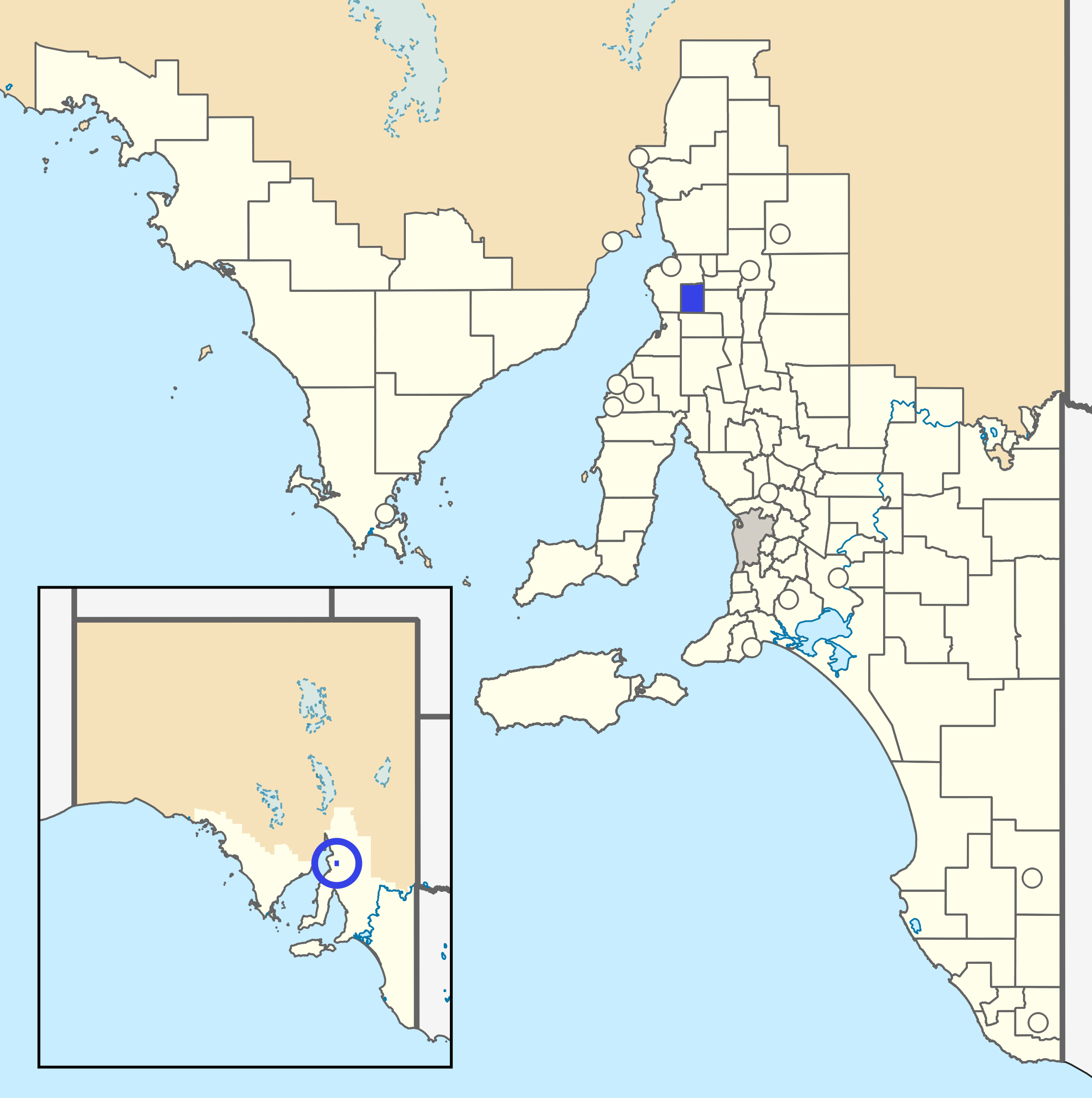
The District Council of Crystal Brook as it was prior to disestablishment (blue)

The District Council of Crystal Brook was a local government area in South Australia from 1882 until 1988, seated at Crystal Brook.

== History ==
The Hundred of Crystal Brook was released for settlement under the Strangways Land Act with the first land sale on 3 March 1873. A Local Board of Main Roads for the North Midland District was established at Gladstone in 1874. This ceased to function in 1887. The District Council of Crystal Brook was proclaimed on 11 November 1882, and comprised only the township of Crystal Brook and the suburban sections of the hundred, after a proposed broader council covering the entire hundred met with resistance from rural residents.

The council expanded significantly under the District Councils Act 1887, adding the remainder of the Hundred of Crystal Brook, the sections of the Hundred of Pirie not included in the Corporate Town of Port Pirie, the entirety of the Hundreds of Napperby and Wandearah, and the as yet ungazetted Hundred of Howe (section of the Wirrabara Forest Reserve within the County of Victoria). It was divided into four wards on 7 June 1888. The larger boundaries were short-lived, as on 16 June 1892, the section within the Hundred of Pirie, the Hundred of Wandearah and the northern portions of the hundreds of Nappery and Howe were severed to create the District Council of Pirie. The left the Crystal Brooke council constituted by just the Hundred of Crystal Brook, the Warnertown section of the Hundred of Napperby, and the south half of the Hundred of Howe.

By the 1920s, the council offices were leased from the Crystal Brook Institute. In 1936, the district was estimated to have a population of 1,475 people, with 452 of them being ratepayers. In the early 1970s, it constructed a new caravan park in the town with the assistance of the state government. It published a local history, Changing with Crystal Brook, 1873-1973 by J. Poore, in 1973. The council ceased to exist on 1 July 1988 when it amalgamated with the District Council of Redhill to form the District Council of Crystal Brook-Redhill, at the instigation of the two councils. They had previously proposed for the District Council of Georgetown to join the merger, but this had not been successful.

== Neighbouring local government ==
The following adjacent local government bodies co-existed with the Crystal Brook council:

- Corporate Town of Port Pirie lay north west until the District Council of Pirie was established between it and Crystal Brook council in 1892. The District Council of Pirie then lay west, north west and north of Crystal Brook council.
- District Council of Port Germein lay north and north east from its establishment in 1888 until the District Council of Pirie was established between it and Crystal Brook council in 1892.
- District Council of Gladstone (established 1876) lay immediately east until large portions of Crystal Brook council were severed to form the District Council of Pirie, after which time Gladstone council lay north east.
- District Council of Narridy (established 1876) lay immediately east until it was amalgamated into the District Council of Georgetown in 1888 after which time the latter lay to the east.
- District Council of Redhill lay south and south east from its establishment in 1888 until it merged with Crystal Brook council in 1988.
- District Council of Mundoora (later called District Council of Port Broughton) lay south west from its establishment in 1892.

== Chairmen ==
- E. Prescott (1882–1885)
- P. H. Claridge (1885–1886)
- C. F. Mole (1886–1887)
- P. H. Claridge (1887–1889)
- E. H. Eagle (1889–1892)
- M. J. B. Wake (1892–1898)
- W. H. Binney (1898–1906)
- G. Davidson (1906–1921)
- R. M. Dennis (1922–1923)
- G. Davidson (1923–1924)
- A. McDonald (1924–1929)
- William Walsh Robinson (1929–1942)
- Peter O'Shaughnessy (1942–1947)
- Cecil Graham Davidson (1947–1953)
- Reginald Keith Hosking (1953–1954)
- Patrick Curtin (1954–1958)
- Michael John Slattery (1958–1966)
- Edward Tait Sinclair (1966–1968)
- Michael John Slattery (1968–1969)
- Edwin Latta Robinson (1969–1972)
- Roland Franklin Nicholls (1972–1979)
- Colin Leslie Matheson (1979–1983)
- John William Millard (1983–?)
