= Risdon Park, South Australia =

Risdon Park
- Suburb
- Interactive map of Risdon Park
- Coordinates: 33.168°S 138.068°E
- Country: Australia
- State: South Australia
- City: Port Pirie
- LGA: Port Pirie Regional Council
- Location: 3 km (1.9 mi) southwest of Port Pirie town centre

Government
  - State electorate: Frome
  - Federal division: Grey

Population
  - Total: 3,878 (SAL 2021)
- Postcode: 5540
Suburbs around Risdon Park
	Port Pirie West	Port Pirie
Port Davis	Risdon Park	Port Pirie South
	Risdon Park South

Risdon Park is a suburb of Port Pirie in South Australia. It was derived from a private subdivision comprising sections 88, 101, 102, 104 and 107 of the Hundred of Pirie. Its boundaries were fixed in 1978 and have been adjusted in 1995.

== Community ==
Risdon Park Primary School and the Central Risdon netball team are based in the town. Risdon Park High School closed in 1994 by merging in to John Pirie Secondary School and no longer uses the campus.
