= Port Davis, South Australia =

Port Davis Port Pirie, South Australia
- Coordinates: 33.26°S 137.85°E
- Population: 4 (SAL 2021)
- Established: 1995
- Postcode(s): 5540
- Time zone: ACST (UTC+9:30)
  - Summer (DST): ACST (UTC+10:30)
- Location: 197 km (122 mi) north of Adelaide city centre; 18 km (11 mi) west of Port Pirie
- LGA(s): Port Pirie Regional Council
- State electorate(s): Frome
- Federal division(s): Grey
Mean max temp	Mean min temp	Annual rainfall
22.7 °C; 73 °F	9.3 °C; 49 °F	473.3 mm 18.6 in
Suburbs around Port Davis:
Spencer Gulf	Spencer Gulf	Port Pirie West
Spencer Gulf	Port Davis	Risdon Park; Risdon Park South; Pirie East
Spencer Gulf	Lower Broughton	Lower Broughton
- Footnotes: Coordinates; Location; Climate; Adjoining localities

Port Davis is a locality in the Australian state of South Australia on the east coast of Spencer Gulf about 18 kilometres (11 miles) to the west of the city of Port Pirie and about 197 kilometres (122 miles) north of the state capital of Adelaide.

The locality was established in June 1995 in respect to “the long established name.”

Port Davis occupies land on the west and north side of a promontory known as Jarrold Point which itself forms part of the southern side of Germein Bay. The locality includes the mouth of the Broughton River which is also known as Port Davis Creek.

Land use within the locality consists of conservation along the coastline where built development will be minimal and will be limited to “low-intensity recreational uses” and where provided, will complement the environment of the locality, and agriculture on its southeastern side.

Port Davis is located within the federal Division of Grey, the state electoral district of Frome and the local government area of the Port Pirie Regional Council.
