= Hundred of Wandearah =

- Cadastral division
- Coordinates: 33.40°S 137.99°E
- Country: Australia
- State: South Australia
- Region: Mid North
- LGA(s): Port Pirie Region
- Established: 31 December 1874

Area
  - Total: 280 km^{2} (109 sq mi)
- County: Victoria
Lands administrative divisions around Hundred of Wandearah
Spencer Gulf	Pirie	Napperby
Spencer Gulf	Wandearah	Crystal Brook
Spencer Gulf	Mundoora	Redhill

The Hundred of Wandearah is a cadastral unit of hundred in South Australia. It is one of the 14 hundreds of the County of Victoria and was proclaimed by Governor Anthony Musgrave in December 1874. The hundred lacks any townships and is split into the bounded of localities of Wandearah West and Wandearah East. According to South Australian historians Rodney Cockburn and Geoffrey Manning, it was named for an indigenous term meaning "big trees".

== See also ==
- Lands administrative divisions of South Australia
