= Germein Bay, South Australia =

Suburb of Port Pirie Regional Council

Germein Bay
- Suburb
- Coordinates: 33.09238819°S 137.97745293°E
- Country: Australia
- State: South Australia
- LGA: Port Pirie Regional Council District Council of Mount Remarkable
- Location: 205 km (127 mi) north of Adelaide city centre; 6 km (3.7 mi) northeast of Port Pirie
- Established: 1997

Government
  - State electorate: Frome Stuart
  - Federal division: Grey

Population
  - Total: 5 (SAL 2021)
- Time zone: UTC+9:30 (ACST)
  - Summer (DST): UTC+10:30 (ACST)
- Postcode: none allocated
- Mean max temp: 22.7 °C (72.9 °F)
- Mean min temp: 9.3 °C (48.7 °F)
- Annual rainfall: 473.3 mm (18.63 in)
Suburbs around Germein Bay
Germein Bay (body of water)	Port Germein	Port Germein
Weeroona Island; Germein Bay (body of water)	Germein Bay	Telowie; Nelshaby; Napperby
Germein Bay (body of water)	Solomontown; Bungama	Napperby
- Coordinates; Locations; Climate; Adjoining localities

Germein Bay is a locality in the Australian state of South Australia about 205 kilometres (127 miles) north of the state capital of Adelaide and about 6 kilometres (3.7 mi) northeast of the city of Port Pirie.

Its boundaries were created for the “long established name” for the portion within the Port Pirie Regional Council in March 1997 followed by the portion within the District Council of Mount Remarkable at a later time. Its name is derived from Germein Bay, the body of water to its immediate west.

The locality occupies land on the coastline in the south-eastern corner of Germein Bay. It is bounded to the east by the Augusta Highway and to the south in part by both the Port Pirie River and the Spencer Highway. It encloses the locality of Weeroona Island on all sides except for the west. The Adelaide-Port Augusta railway line passes through the locality on its east side.

The principal land use within the locality is conservation where built development will be minimal and will be limited to “low-intensity recreational uses” and where provided, will complement the environment of the locality.

Germein Bay is located within the federal division of Grey, the state electoral districts of Frome and Stuart and the local government areas of the Port Pirie Regional Council and District Council of Mount Remarkable.
