= List of places in South Australia by population =

This is a list of cities/towns in South Australia by urban centre population.

== Largest Urban Centres and Localities by population ==
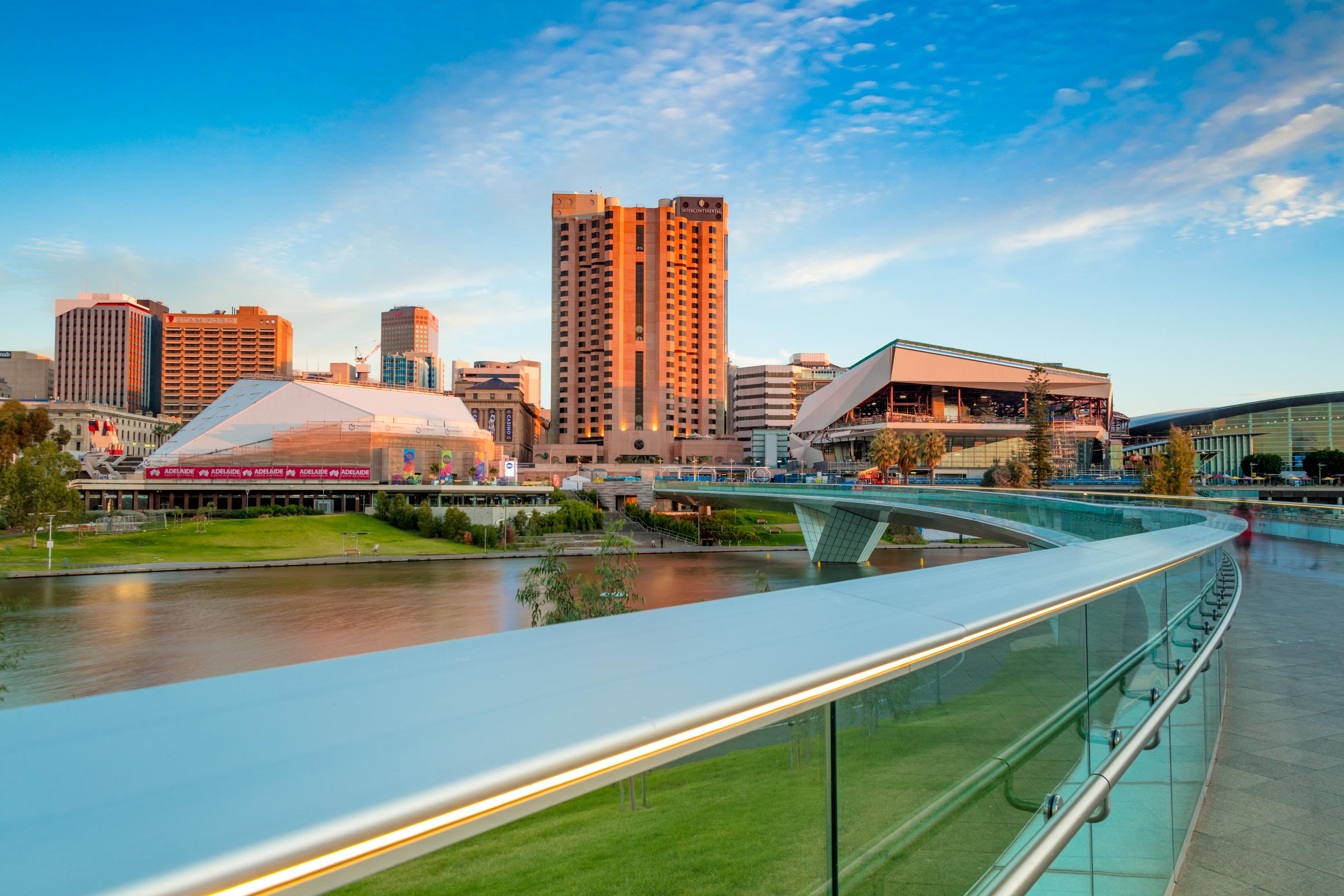
Adelaide, state capital

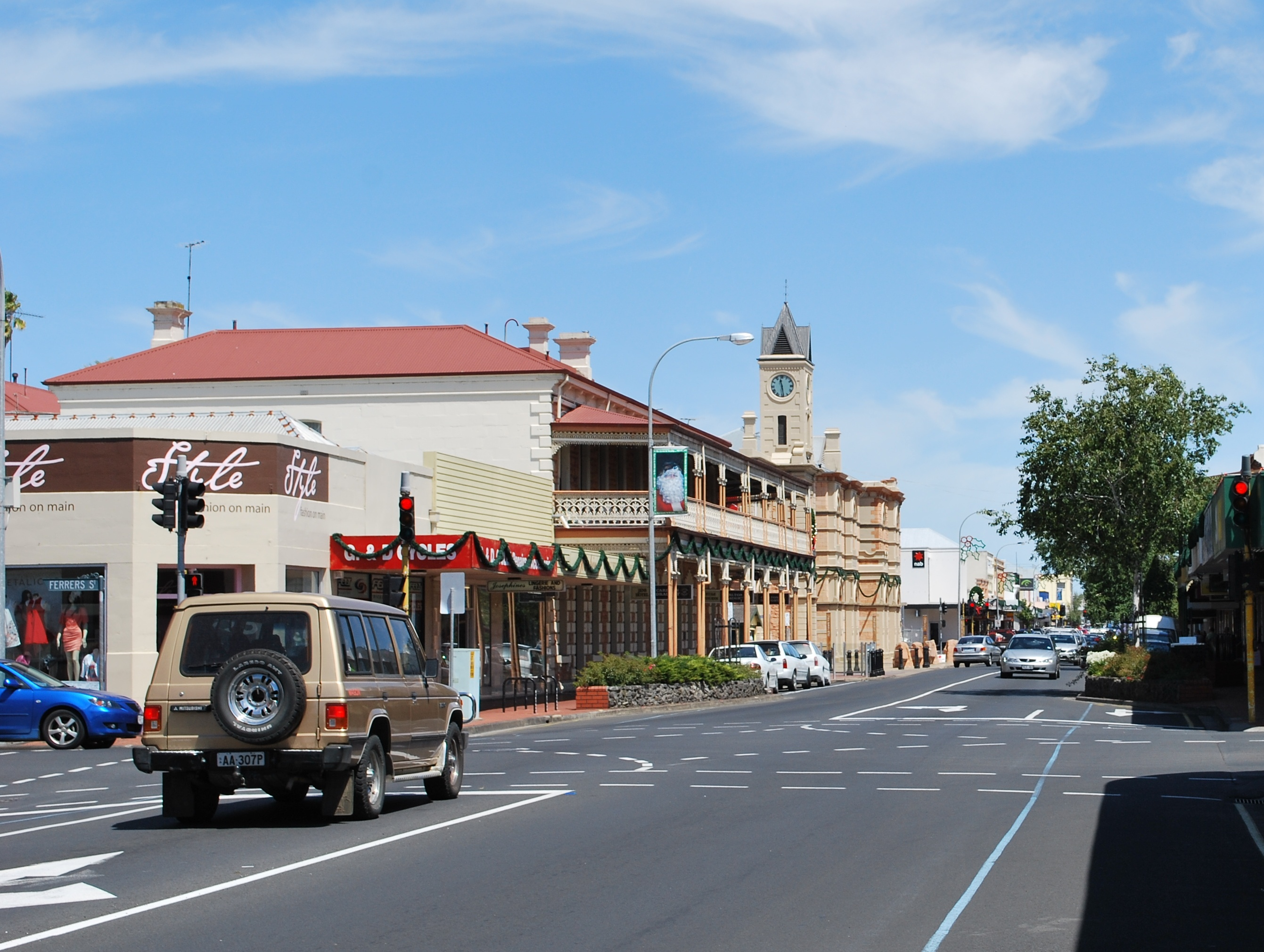
Commercial Street, Mount Gambier

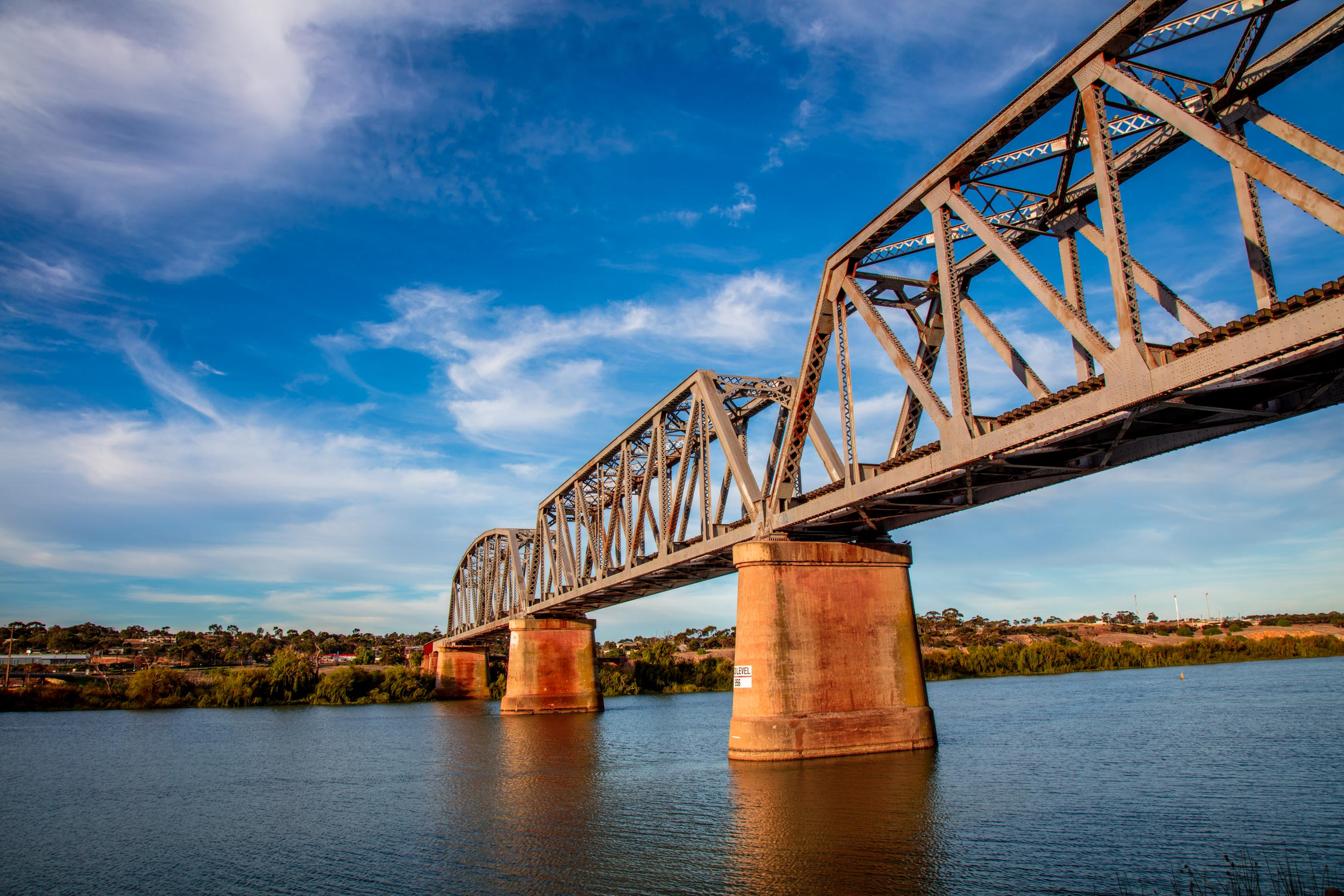
Murray Bridge

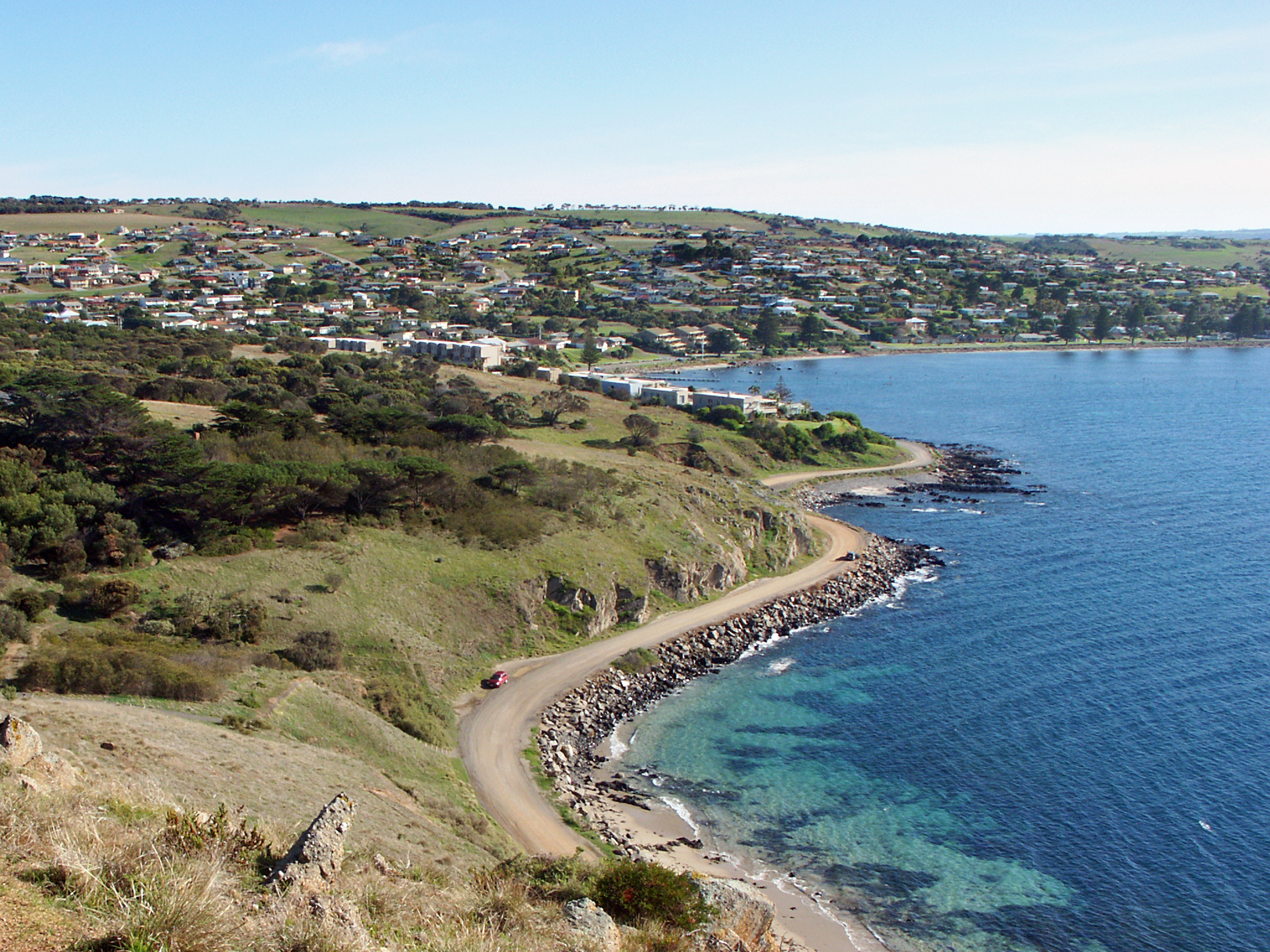
Victor Harbor

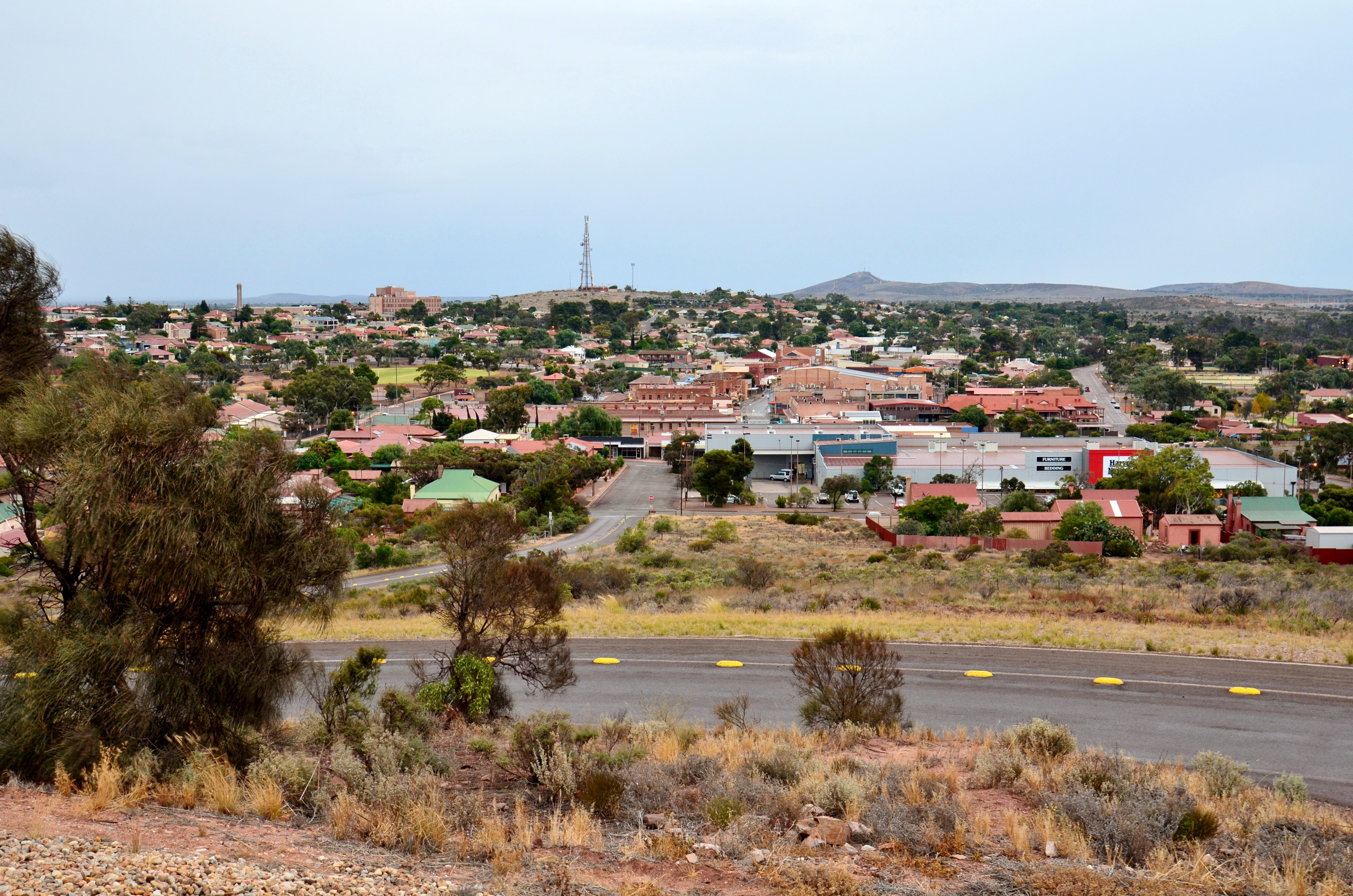
View from Hummock Hill, Whyalla

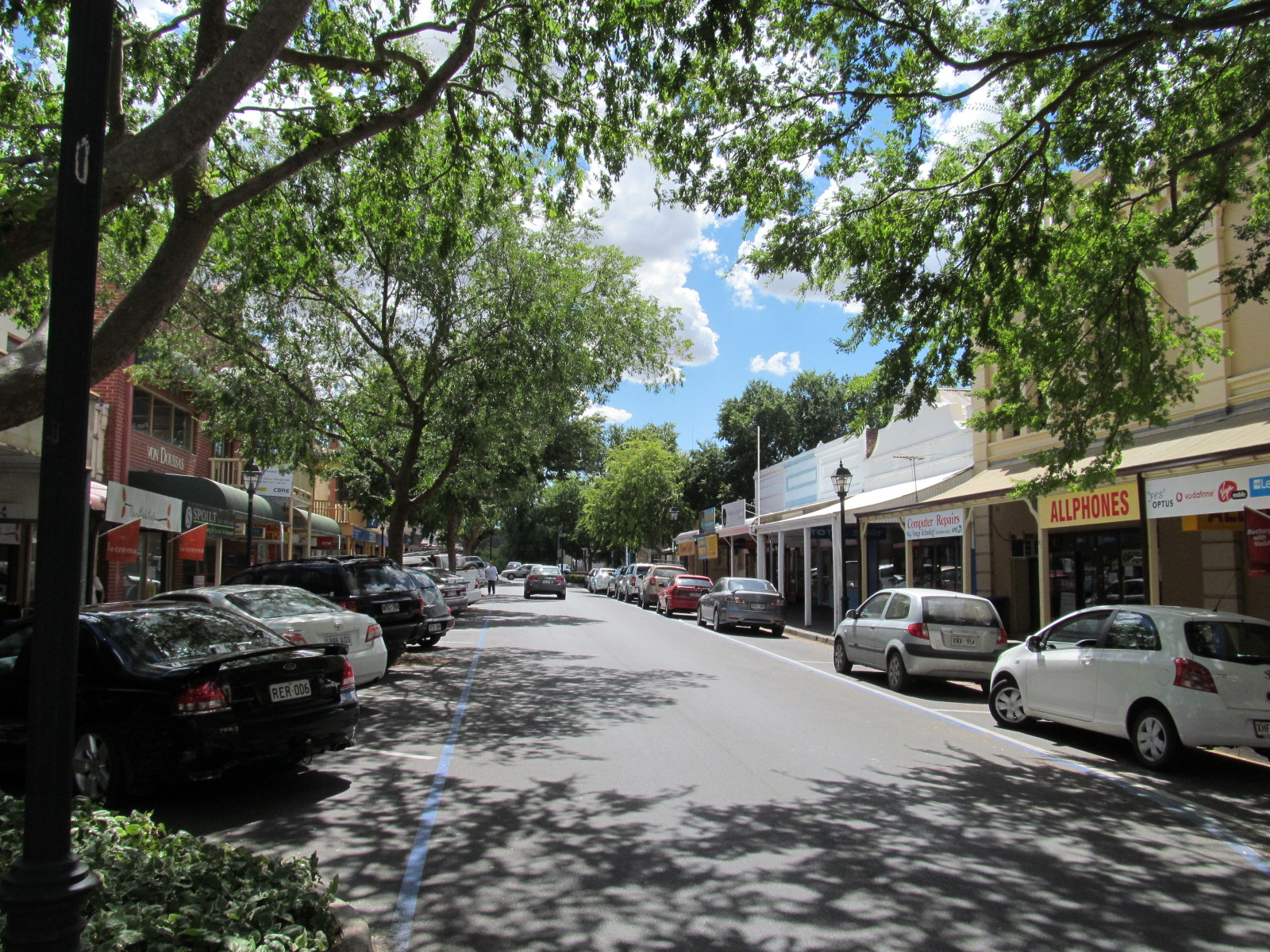
Gawler Street, Mount Barker

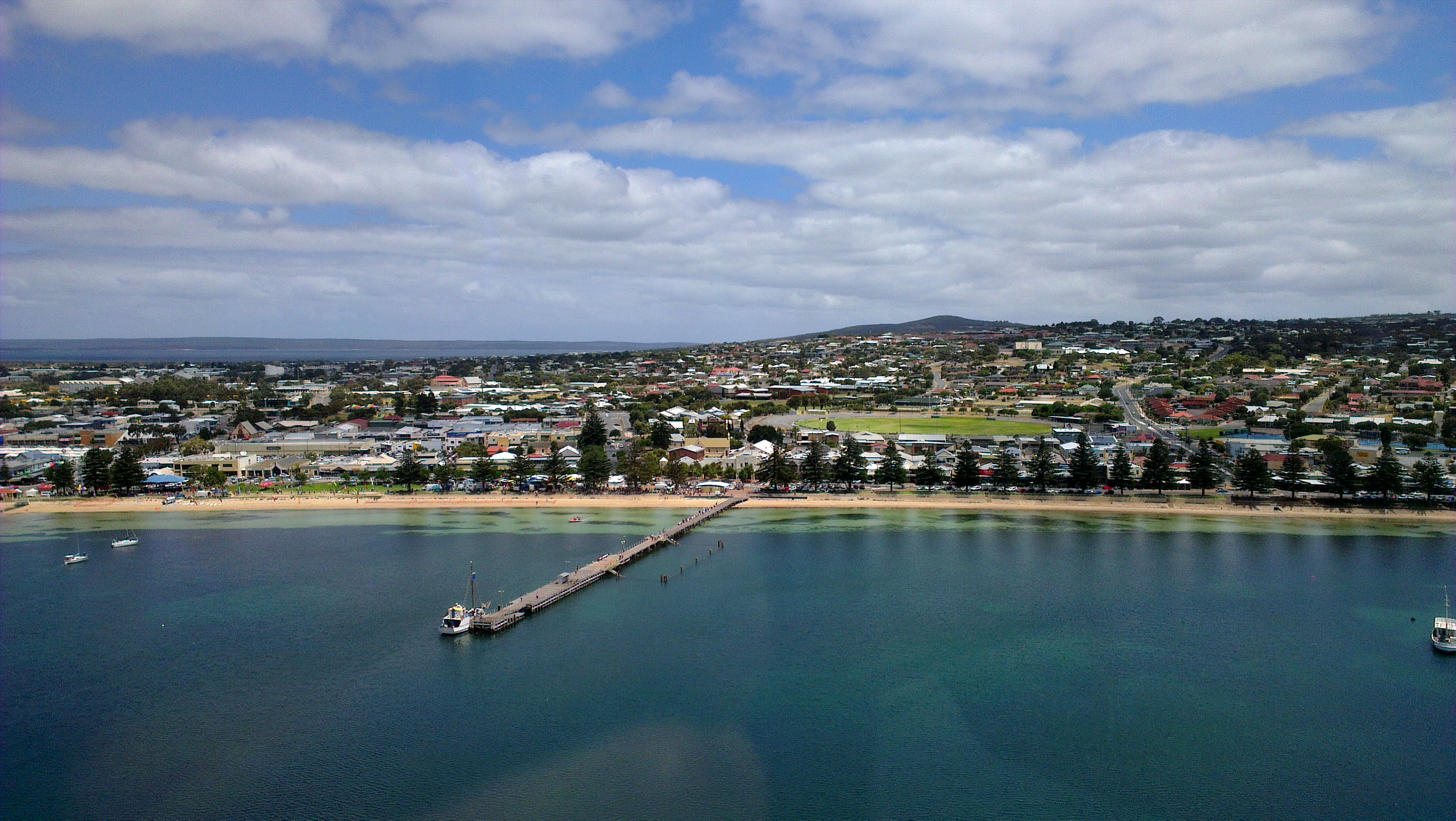
Aerial view of Port Lincoln

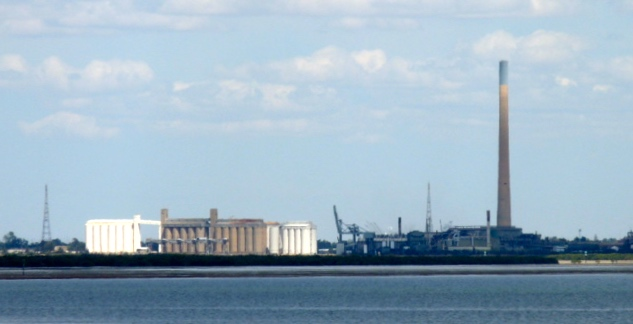
View of Port Pirie

Urban Centres and Localities (UCLs) represent areas of concentrated urban development with populations of 200 people or more. Areas in a state or territory that are not included in an UCL are considered to be ‘rural’. UCLs are not an official definition of towns.

Suburbs of Adelaide are not included, with the exception of Gawler, Mount Barker, Crafers-Bridgewater and Nairne, which can all be seen as semi-rural suburbs but also as separate towns.

| Rank | Urban centre | Population 2001 Census | Population 2006 Census | Population 2011 Census | Population 2016 Census | Population 2021 Census |
|---|---|---|---|---|---|---|
| 1 | Adelaide | 1,066,103 | 1,040,719 | 1,103,979 | 1,165,632 | 1,245,011 |
| 2 | Gawler | 16,779 | 20,006 | 23,957 | 26,472 | 28,562 |
| 3 | Mount Gambier | 22,656 | 23,494 | 25,199 | 26,148 | 26,734 |
| 4 | Mount Barker | 9,116 | 11,540 | 14,452 | 16,629 | 21,554 |
| 5 | Whyalla | 21,211 | 21,122 | 21,736 | 21,501 | 20,880 |
| 6 | Murray Bridge | 12,998 | 14,048 | 15,967 | 16,804 | 17,457 |
| 7 | Victor Harbor | 8,923 | 10,380 | 13,411 | 15,265 | 16,709 |
| 8 | Crafers-Bridgewater | 13,130 | 13,375 | 14,617 | 15,125 | 15,783 |
| 9 | Port Lincoln | 12,630 | 13,044 | 14,088 | 14,064 | 14,404 |
| 10 | Port Pirie | 13,254 | 13,206 | 13,819 | 13,740 | 13,708 |
| 11 | Port Augusta | 13,153 | 13,257 | 13,504 | 12,896 | 12,788 |
| 12 | Goolwa | 4,327 | 5,882 | 6,385 | 7,717 | 8,756 |
| 13 | Strathalbyn | 3,204 | 3,894 | 5,292 | 5,486 | 6,429 |
| 14 | Nuriootpa | 3,846 | 4,414 | 5,215 | 5,691 | 6,204 |
| 15 | Naracoorte | 4,745 | 4,888 | 4,908 | 5,074 | 5,223 |
| 16 | Nairne | 2,770 | 3,470 | 4,198 | 4,842 | 5,082 |
| 17 | Millicent | 4,430 | 4,771 | 4,798 | 4,734 | 4,760 |
| 18 | Renmark | 4,448 | 4,339 | 4,387 | 4,634 | 4,703 |
| 19 | Kadina | 3,742 | 4,026 | 4,470 | 4,587 | 4,666 |
| 20 | Moonta | 3,068 | 3,350 | 3,659 | 4,174 | 4,627 |
| 21 | Tanunda | 3,836 | 4,153 | 4,214 | 4,324 | 4,394 |
| 22 | Wallaroo | 2,710 | 3,053 | 3,795 | 3,988 | 4,241 |
| 23 | Berri | 4,214 | 4,008 | 4,103 | 4,088 | 4,143 |
| 24 | Angle Vale | 1,229 | 1,359 | 2,363 | 2,818 | 4,088 |
| 25 | Loxton | 3,352 | 3,431 | 3,795 | 3,838 | 3,947 |
| 26 | Roxby Downs | 3,608 | 3,847 | 4,702 | 3,588 | 3,671 |
| 27 | Clare | 2,921 | 3,063 | 3,278 | 3,327 | 3,379 |
| 28 | McLaren Vale | 2,584 | 2,908 | 3,043 | 3,096 | 3,277 |
| 29 | Two Wells | 634 | 717 | 1,764 | 1,926 | 2,947 |
| 30 | Bordertown | 2,440 | 2,581 | 2,549 | 2,669 | 2,840 |
| 31 | Kapunda | 2,301 | 2,480 | 2,484 | 2,598 | 2,633 |
| 32 | Mannum | 2,189 | 2,042 | 2,164 | 2,398 | 2,537 |
| 33 | Freeling | 1,137 | 1,325 | 1,591 | 2,052 | 2,516 |
| 34 | Hahndorf | 1,836 | 1,805 | 2,092 | 2,180 | 2,313 |
| 35 | Willunga | 1,894 | 2,104 | 2,094 | 2,143 | 2,300 |
| 36 | Ceduna | 2,564 | 2,304 | 2,289 | 2,157 | 2,290 |
| 37 | Normanville | 1,012 | 1,303 | 1,637 | 1,906 | 2,262 |
| 38 | Williamstown | 1,280 | 1,432 | 1,882 | 2,163 | 2,238 |
| 39 | Angaston | 1,930 | 1,865 | 1,940 | 2,044 | 2,184 |
| 40 | Lewiston | 2,059 | 2,742 | 1,545 | 1,589 | 2,174 |
| 40 | Lobethal | 1,679 | 1,836 | 1,957 | 2,135 | 2,174 |
| 42 | Balaklava | 1,531 | 1,626 | 1,827 | 1,902 | 1,956 |
| 43 | Kingscote | 1,671 | 1,692 | 1,763 | 1,790 | 1,915 |
| 44 | Barmera | 1,942 | 1,928 | 1,914 | 1,935 | 1,895 |
| 45 | Woodside | 1,565 | 1,826 | 1,842 | 1,870 | 1,890 |
| 46 | Lyndoch | 1,245 | 1,415 | 1,618 | 1,799 | 1,883 |
| 47 | Virginia | 307 | 319 | 750 | 783 | 1,687 |
| 48 | Waikerie | 1,769 | 1,744 | 1,633 | 1,632 | 1,670 |
| 49 | Balhannah | 1,488 | 1,501 | 1,597 | 1,546 | 1,660 |
| 50 | Kingston SE | 1,475 | 1,630 | 1,612 | 1,648 | 1,637 |
| 51 | Tumby Bay | 1,223 | 1,351 | 1,474 | 1,417 | 1,511 |
| 52 | Coober Pedy | 2,438 | 1,472 | 1,584 | 1,625 | 1,437 |
| 53 | Peterborough | 1,679 | 1,689 | 1,486 | 1,416 | 1,428 |
| 54 | Tailem Bend | 1,391 | 1,457 | 1,405 | 1,410 | 1,412 |
| 55 | Jamestown | 1,356 | 1,407 | 1,406 | 1,392 | 1,389 |
| 56 | Penola | 1,219 | 1,317 | 1,337 | 1,312 | 1,376 |
| 57 | Crystal Brook | 1,266 | 1,185 | 1,278 | 1,324 | 1,322 |
| 58 | Mount Compass | 498 | 695 | 1,042 | 1,119 | 1,232 |
| 59 | Ardrossan | 1,078 | 1,122 | 1,136 | 1,167 | 1,188 |
| 60 | McLaren Flat | No Data | 642 | 1,034 | 1,121 | 1,175 |
| 61 | Robe | 949 | 1,246 | 1,018 | 998 | 1,156 |
| 62 | Quorn | 988 | 1,068 | 1,206 | 1,131 | 1,150 |
| 63 | Keith | 1,130 | 1,089 | 1,069 | 1,076 | 1,140 |
| 64 | Meadows | 771 | 752 | 705 | 804 | 1,126 |
| 65 | Port Broughton | 725 | 908 | 982 | 1,034 | 1,116 |
| 66 | Maitland | 992 | 1,056 | 1047 | 1,029 | 1,079 |
| 67 | Middleton | No Data | No Data | No Data | 932 | 1,057 |
| 68 | Greenock | 684 | 685 | 839 | 954 | 1,045 |
| 69 | Paringa | 808 | 946 | 915 | 984 | 1,026 |
| 70 | Cowell | 791 | 942 | 942 | 990 | 1,004 |
| 71 | Roseworthy | 538 | 668 | 664 | 948 | 987 |
| 72 | Macclesfield | 806 | 832 | 967 | 958 | 977 |
| 73 | Streaky Bay | 1,077 | 1,059 | 1,005 | 979 | 967 |
| 74 | Birdwood | 730 | 734 | 825 | 891 | 932 |
| 75 | Uraidla* | 453 | 461 | 903 | 916 | 931 |
| 75 | Summertown* | 433 | 382 | 903 | 916 | 931 |
| 76 | Burra | 1,097 | 978 | 893 | 907 | 922 |
| 77 | Mallala | 693 | 737 | 754 | 733 | 887 |
| 78 | Meningie | 902 | 940 | 921 | 852 | 860 |
| 79 | Milang | 446 | 512 | 635 | 761 | 831 |
| 80 | Cleve | 703 | 738 | 754 | 789 | 796 |
| 81 | Riverton | 668 | 723 | 810 | 793 | 795 |
| 81 | Yankalilla | 439 | 555 | 547 | 707 | 795 |
| 83 | Minlaton | 756 | 773 | 744 | 800 | 759 |
| 84 | Cummins | 666 | 705 | 719 | 726 | 748 |
| 85 | Gumeracha | 643 | 731 | 715 | 701 | 721 |
| 86 | Cockatoo Valley | No Data | 479 | 515 | 617 | 688 |
| 87 | Coffin Bay | 452 | 584 | 615 | 606 | 667 |
| 87 | Yorketown | 646 | 685 | 680 | 642 | 667 |
| 89 | Wasleys | 230 | 235 | 372 | 348 | 661 |
| 89 | Willyaroo | No Data | No Data | 362 | 582 | 661 |
| 91 | Port MacDonnell | No Data | 623 | 650 | 671 | 660 |
| 92 | Echunga | 513 | 533 | 567 | 571 | 630 |
| 93 | Gladstone | 624 | 629 | 610 | 629 | 623 |
| 94 | Mount Pleasant | 565 | 593 | 587 | 586 | 618 |
| 95 | Hamley Bridge | 652 | 631 | 633 | 613 | 615 |
| 96 | Kimba | 686 | 636 | 670 | 629 | 608 |
| 97 | Eudunda | 603 | 640 | 632 | 560 | 601 |
| 98 | Port Wakefield | 493 | 476 | 556 | 560 | 593 |
| 99 | Pinnaroo | 595 | 587 | 558 | 547 | 575 |
| 100 | Lameroo | 485 | 516 | 537 | 562 | 567 |
| 101 | One Tree Hill | No Data | 579 | 575 | 579 | 543 |
| 102 | Beachport | 410 | 346 | 382 | 436 | 530 |
| 103 | Laura | 503 | 570 | 499 | 478 | 522 |
| 104 | Pukatja (Ernabella) | 453 | 332 | 504 | 497 | 519 |
| 105 | Orroroo | 598 | 543 | 540 | 537 | 516 |
| 105 | Wudinna | 531 | 513 | 557 | 549 | 516 |
| 107 | Houghton | 435 | 472 | 557 | 502 | 511 |
| 107 | Kanmantoo | No Data | No Data | 503 | 512 | 511 |
| 109 | Edithburgh | 433 | 395 | 466 | 454 | 497 |
| 110 | Port Vincent | 455 | 472 | 490 | 469 | 494 |
| 111 | Stansbury | 538 | 522 | 543 | 567 | 480 |
| 112 | Callington | 338 | 387 | 408 | 455 | 478 |
| 113 | Wilmington | 238 | 220 | 493 | 419 | 472 |
| 114 | Nangwarry | 496 | 503 | 514 | 483 | 456 |
| 115 | Myponga | No Data | No Data | 219 | 393 | 443 |
| 116 | Blyth | 284 | 306 | 377 | 430 | 442 |
| 117 | Kersbrook | 316 | 367 | 432 | 390 | 417 |
| 118 | Springton | 277 | 330 | 411 | 378 | 398 |
| 119 | Saddleworth | 386 | 425 | 391 | 363 | 397 |
| 120 | Truro | 318 | 365 | 395 | 404 | 396 |
| 121 | Amata | 277 | 319 | 467 | 455 | 393 |
| 122 | Boston | No Data | No Data | 337 | 337 | 390 |
| 123 | Clayton Bay | No Data | No Data | 240 | 298 | 386 |
| 124 | Auburn | 335 | 318 | 389 | 387 | 370 |
| 125 | Snowtown | 394 | 405 | 400 | 390 | 356 |
| 126 | Indulkana | 225 | 315 | 310 | 256 | 338 |
| 127 | Karoonda | 312 | 358 | 330 | 351 | 337 |
| 128 | Elliston | 239 | 201 | 292 | 326 | 333 |
| 129 | Tarpeena | 374 | 406 | 355 | 337 | 329 |
| 130 | Point Turton | No Data | 205 | 245 | 305 | 327 |
| 131 | Morgan | 419 | 426 | 323 | 339 | 326 |
| 132 | Mount Burr | 373 | 380 | 377 | 314 | 324 |
| 132 | Mount Torrens | 317 | 337 | 338 | 299 | 324 |
| 132 | Mundulla | No Data | No Data | 420 | 314 | 324 |
| 135 | Port Victoria | 326 | 345 | 316 | 278 | 321 |
| 136 | Charleston | No Data | No Data | 321 | 321 | 317 |
| 137 | Yalata | No Data | No Data | 294 | 224 | 302 |
| 138 | Southend | No Data | No Data | 248 | 254 | 292 |
| 139 | Napperby | 256 | 249 | 300 | 284 | 291 |
| 140 | Lucindale | 281 | 301 | 247 | 230 | 288 |
| 141 | Kalangadoo | 295 | 305 | 271 | 288 | 287 |
| 142 | Port Germein | 280 | 249 | 296 | 308 | 282 |
| 143 | American River | No Data | 227 | 216 | 238 | 280 |
| 144 | Allendale East | No Data | No Data | 260 | 276 | 277 |
| 144 | Mimili | 264 | 283 | 281 | 243 | 277 |
| 144 | Tintinara | 271 | 257 | 276 | 266 | 277 |
| 147 | Swan Reach | 273 | 235 | 223 | 209 | 274 |
| 148 | Mullaquana | No Data | No Data | 252 | 248 | 270 |
| 149 | Penneshaw | No Data | 265 | 276 | 275 | 269 |
| 150 | Booleroo Centre | 314 | 331 | 328 | 289 | 266 |
| 151 | Kaltjiti (Fregon) | 245 | No Data | No Data | 220 | 261 |
| 152 | Andamooka | 496 | 528 | 592 | 316 | 260 |
| 153 | Owen | 221 | 227 | 272 | 261 | 251 |
| 154 | Blanchetown | 203 | 231 | 210 | 245 | 247 |
| 155 | Bute | 265 | 268 | 265 | 242 | 228 |
| 156 | Parham | No Data | No Data | No Data | 264 | 227 |
| 157 | Hawker | 290 | 229 | 246 | 237 | 226 |
| 157 | Tantanoola | 259 | 255 | 264 | 231 | 226 |
| 159 | Coobowie | No Data | No Data | 220 | 207 | 222 |
| 160 | Arno Bay | 240 | 273 | 227 | 234 | 219 |
| 161 | Yahl | No Data | No Data | 207 | 224 | 211 |
| 162 | Wirrabara | 236 | 251 | 218 | 230 | 206 |
| 163 | Cobdogla | 268 | 232 | 231 | 197 | 197 |
| 164 | Spalding | 198 | 212 | 207 | 215 | 194 |
| 164 | Warooka | 215 | 247 | 198 | 195 | 194 |
| 166 | Clarendon | No Data | 266 | 228 | 199 | 193 |
| 166 | Coonalpyn | 209 | 231 | 220 | 195 | 193 |
| 168 | Smokey Bay | No Data | No Data | 195 | 217 | 162 |
| 169 | Port Neill | No Data | No Data | 136 | 140 | 154 |
| 170 | Woomera | 598 | 295 | 216 | 146 | 132 |
| 171 | Leigh Creek | 618 | 549 | 505 | 245 | 91 |

*Uraidila and Summertown are recorded separately until 2011 when they are merged.

== 25 largest local government areas by population ==
Local government areas are the main units of local government in Australia. They may be termed cities, shires, councils or other names, but they all function similarly.

| Rank | Local government area | Population 2016 census | Population 2018 estimate | Growth rate | Stat. division/district |
|---|---|---|---|---|---|
| 1. | City of Onkaparinga | 166,766 | 171,489 | 2.8% | Adelaide |
| 2. | City of Salisbury | 137,979 | 142,555 | 3.3% | Adelaide |
| 3. | City of Port Adelaide Enfield | 121,230 | 126,120 | 4.0% | Adelaide |
| 4. | City of Charles Sturt | 111,759 | 117,382 | 5.0% | Adelaide |
| 5. | City of Tea Tree Gully | 97,734 | 99,694 | 2.0% | Adelaide |
| 6. | City of Playford | 90,669 | 93,426 | 3.0% | Adelaide |
| 7. | City of Marion | 88,618 | 92,308 | 4.2% | Adelaide |
| 8. | City of Mitcham | 66,834 | 67,253 | 0.6% | Adelaide |
| 9. | City of West Torrens | 57,901 | 60,105 | 3.8% | Adelaide |
| 10. | City of Campbelltown | 50,164 | 51,469 | 2.6% | Adelaide |
| 11. | City of Burnside | 43,911 | 45,706 | 4.1% | Adelaide |
| 12. | Adelaide Hills Council | 38,863 | 39,794 | 2.4% | Adelaide |
| 13. | City of Unley | 37,721 | 39,145 | 3.8% | Adelaide |
| 14. | City of Holdfast Bay | 36,681 | 37,032 | 1.0% | Adelaide |
| 15. | City of Norwood Payneham & St Peters | 35,362 | 36,750 | 3.9% | Adelaide |
| 16. | District Council of Mount Barker | 33,397 | 35,545 | 6.4% | Adelaide |
| 17. | City of Mount Gambier | 26,276 | 27,176 | 3.4% | Mount Gambier |
| 18. | Alexandrina Council | 25,873 | 27,037 | 4.5% | Alexandrina |
| 19. | Barossa Council | 23,558 | 24,808 | 5.3% | Barossa |
| 20. | City of Adelaide | 22,063 | 24,794 | 12.3% | Adelaide |
| 21. | Town of Gawler | 23,034 | 24,018 | 4.3% | Gawler |
| 22. | Rural City of Murray Bridge | 20,858 | 22,165 | 6.3% | Murray Bridge |
| 23. | City of Whyalla | 21,828 | 21,766 | -0.3% | Whyalla |
| 24. | City of Prospect | 20,527 | 21,259 | 3.6% | Adelaide |
| 25. | Port Pirie Regional Council | 17,364 | 17,630 | 1.5% | Port Pirie |

== See also ==
- Demographics of Australia
- List of cities in Australia
- List of places in New South Wales by population
- List of places in the Northern Territory by population
- List of places in Queensland by population
- List of places in Tasmania by population
- List of places in Victoria by population
- List of places in Western Australia by population
