= Redhill, South Australia =

Redhill
- Town
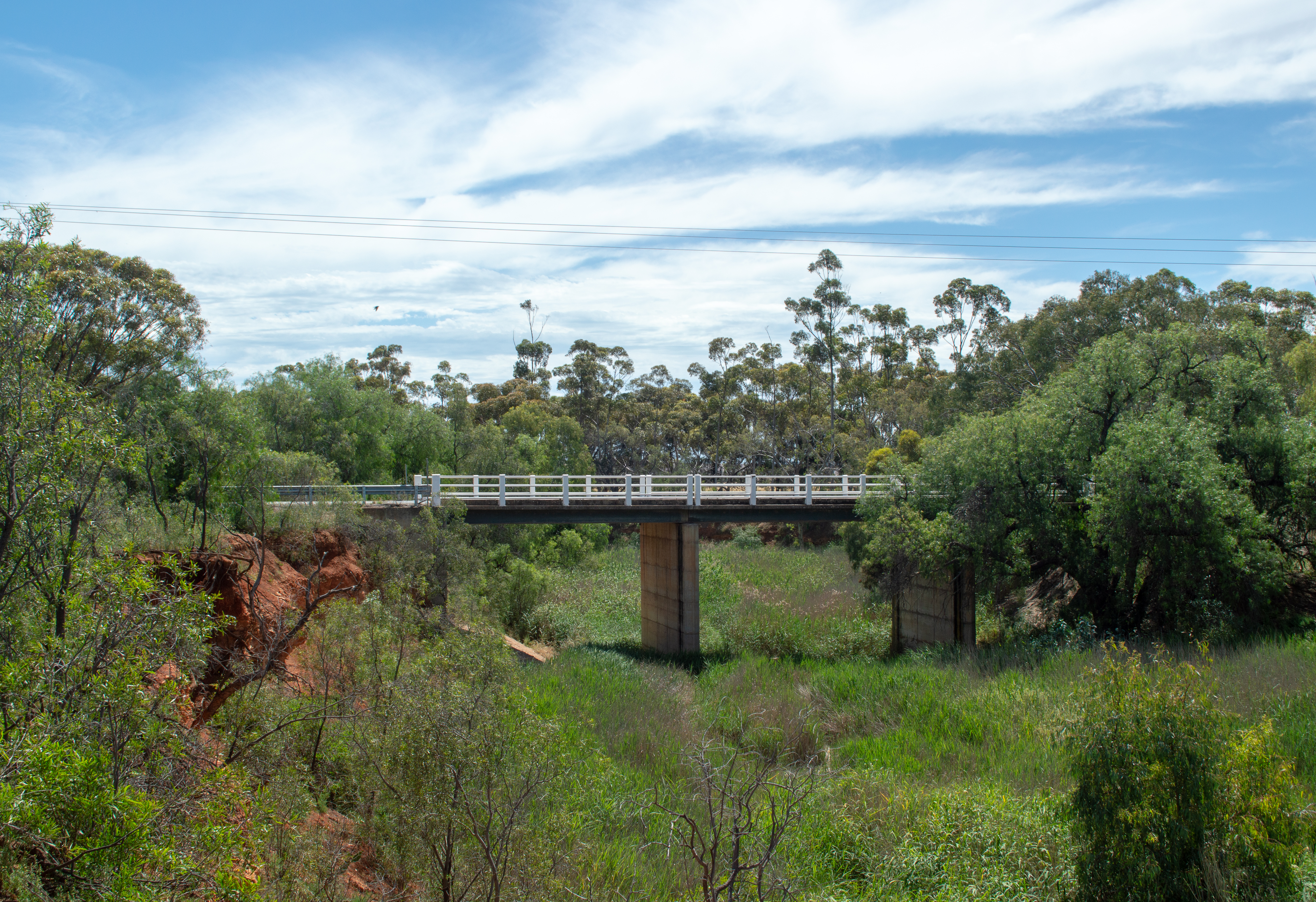
- Bridge over the Broughton River immediately north of Redhill township

- Coordinates: 33°32′0″S 138°13′0″E
- Country: Australia
- State: South Australia
- Region: Mid North
- LGA: Port Pirie Regional Council
- Location: 176 km (109 mi) north of Adelaide; 52 km (32 mi) south-east of Port Pirie

Government
  - State electorate: Stuart
  - Federal division: Grey

Population
  - Total: 147 (SAL 2021)
- Postcode: 5521
Localities around Redhill
Wandearah East	Crystal Brook; Merriton	Narridy
Clements Gap	Redhill	Koolunga
Mundoora,	Collinsfield; Hope Gap; Lake View	Brinkworth

Redhill (formerly Broughton) is a town in the Mid North of South Australia adjacent to the Broughton River.

== Governance ==
Redhill is in the Port Pirie Regional Council local government area, the South Australian House of Assembly electoral district of Stuart and the Australian House of Representatives Division of Grey.

== History ==
Redhill was established in the late nineteenth century under the name of Broughton, with a hotel, blacksmith, general store, and other businesses built within the township. Several churches were also built in the township. A primary school operated in the town for many years.

The town was formally renamed as Redhill in 1940, but it had been known by that name well before then.

== Heritage sites ==
The Redhill Geological Site on the Redhill to Yacka Road is listed on the South Australian Heritage Register.

== Attractions and facilities ==
The town has a small museum opposite the Eureka Hotel, located in the former offices of the District Council of Redhill.

A cemetery is located on the town's south eastern outskirts.

== Wind farm ==
In January 2025 the state government gave approval to AGL for the Barn Hill Wind Farm and Battery Project to be constructed on a site located 5 km (3.1 mi) south-west of Redhill The plans include, firstly a 360 MW capacity wind farm and a new transmission connection, and later a 270 MW battery, providing up to four hours of storage. The windmills will be located across the hilltops between the Snowtown Wind Farm and the Clements Gap Wind Farm. AGL was still to make its final investment decision.

== Transport ==
Redhill was for many years the terminus of a broad gauge branch railway (now the southern part of the Adelaide-Port Augusta railway line) which was meant to continue to Port Pirie to connect directly with the standard gauge Trans-Australian Railway. The link was completed in 1938, resulting in a rare triple gauge yard. In the 1980s, when more lines were converted to standard gauge, the Redhill line was diverted to Crystal Brook.

The Princes Highway bypasses the town with a petrol station situated between the road and the township.
