= Coonamia, South Australia =

Coonamia
- Suburb
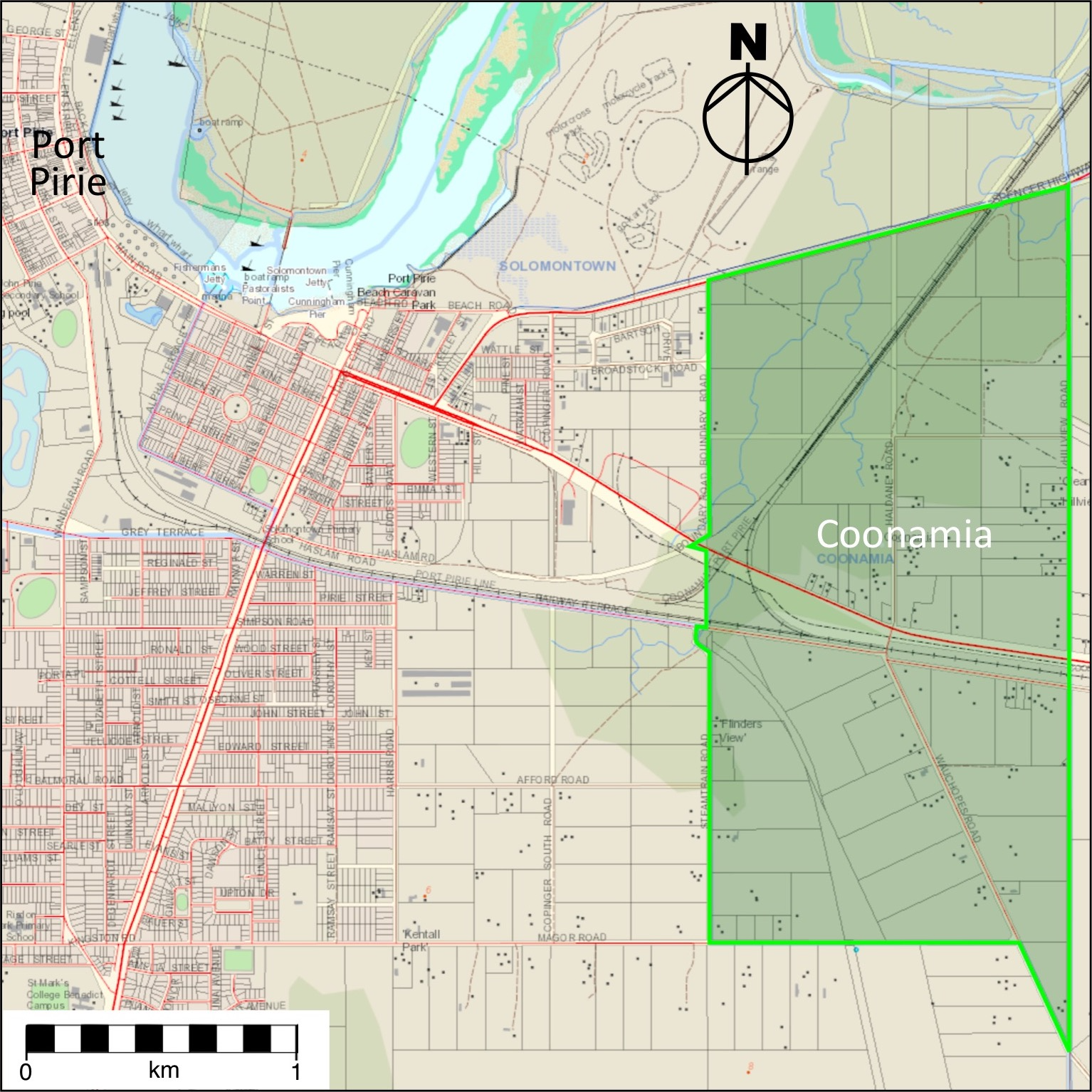
- Map of Coonamia (click to enlarge)

- Interactive map of Coonamia
- Coordinates: 33.192°S 138.043°E
- Country: Australia
- State: South Australia
- City: Port Pirie
- LGA: Port Pirie Regional Council
- Location: 219 km (136 mi) N of Adelaide; 3 km (1.9 mi) SE of Port Pirie

Government
  - State electorate: Stuart
  - Federal division: Grey

Population
  - Total: 96 (SAL 2021)
- Postcode: 5540
Suburbs around Coonamia
Solomontown	Solomontown	Germein Bay
Solomontown; Port Pirie South	Coonamia	Bungama
Port Pirie South	Port Pirie South	Bungama

Coonamia is a lightly populated rural locality in the Mid North region of South Australia, on the plains between Port Pirie and the Southern Flinders Ranges. About 3 km (2 mi) south-east of the centre of Port Pirie, its area is 3.65 square km (1.41 square mi).

The name Coonamia is a local Aboriginal Nukunu/Ngadjuri word meaning "cold".

A "provisional stopping place" on the Port Pirie to Cockburn narrow-gauge railway line was opened in 1929 on Railway Terrace South, Coonamia, near the intersection with Old Race Course Road (now called Hillview Road). Passengers could stop trains by signalling the driver or, to get off, by asking the guard. In 1937 a new, more direct, line connecting to Adelaide followed a different route that bypassed Coonamia; the stopping place became little used and eventually closed. It was re-established for interstate pre-booked passengers from 1989 but was closed in the early 2010s; now only the "Coonamia" sign remains.

== See also ==
- Coonamia railway station
