= Wandearah West, South Australia =

Wandearah West
- Suburb
- Interactive map of Wandearah West
- Coordinates: 33.392750°S 137.973130°E
- Country: Australia
- State: South Australia
- LGA: Port Pirie Regional Council
- Location: 179 km (111 mi) north-west of Adelaide city centre; 22 km (14 mi) south of Port Pirie
- Established: 1995

Government
  - State electorate: Frome
  - Federal division: Grey

Population
  - Total: 17 (SAL 2021)
- Time zone: UTC+9:30 (ACST)
  - Summer (DST): UTC+10:30 (ACST)
- Postcode: 5523
- Mean max temp: 22.7 °C (72.9 °F)
- Mean min temp: 9.3 °C (48.7 °F)
- Annual rainfall: 473.3 mm (18.63 in)
Suburbs around Wandearah West
| Spencer Gulf | Lower Broughton | Lower Broughton |
| Spencer Gulf | Wandearah West | Wandearah East |
| Spencer Gulf | Fisherman Bay | Clements Gap |
- Distances; Coordinates; Climate; Adjoining localities

Wandearah West is a locality in the Australian state of South Australia located on the east coast of Spencer Gulf about 179 kilometres (111 miles) north-west of the Adelaide city centre and about 22 kilometres (14 miles) south of Port Pirie.

Its boundaries were created in June 1995 for the “long established name.” The name was derived from the cadastral unit in which the locality is located - the Hundred of Wandearah, a hundred of the County of Victoria.

As of 2015, land within the locality was zoned for agriculture while a strip of land along its coastline was zoned for conservation. The locator map in the infobox appears to go offshore as the base map shows the back of the beach and the locality boundary extends to low tide.

Wandearah West is located within the federal division of Grey, the state electoral district of Frome and the local government area of the Port Pirie Regional Council.
