= Spencer Highway =

Road in South Australia

Spencer Highway South Australia
- Coordinates: 33.167679°S 138.067768°E (North end); 34.767071°S 137.597617°E (South end)

General information
- Type: Highway
- Length: 207 km (129 mi)
- Route number(s): B89 (1998–present)

Major junctions
- North end: Augusta Highway; Solomontown, South Australia
- Copper Coast Highway
- South end: Yorke Highway; Minlaton, South Australia

Location(s)
- Region: Yorke and Mid North
- Major settlements: Port Pirie, Port Broughton, Wallaroo, Moonta, Maitland

Highway system
- Highways in Australia; National Highway • Freeways in Australia; Highways in South Australia

Spencer Highway (route B89) is a highway along the east coast of Spencer Gulf in South Australia. It runs south from Augusta Highway through Port Pirie to Minlaton.

== Major intersections ==
LGA	Location	km	mi	Destinations	Notes
Port Pirie	Napperby–Solomontown boundary	0	0.0	Augusta Highway (A1) – Port Augusta	Northern terminus of highway and route B89
Port Pirie	Solomontown	2.3	1.4	Adelaide–Port Augusta railway line	
Port Pirie	Port Pirie	4.5	2.8	Warnertown Road – Bungama, Port Wakefield	
Barunga West	Port Broughton	60	37	Upper Yorke Road – Bute, Kulpara	
Barunga West	Alford	88	55	Port Broughton Road – Kadina	
Copper Coast	Wallaroo	110	68	Copper Coast Highway (B85) – Kadina, Port Wakefield	
Copper Coast	Moonta	125	78	Mines Road – Kadina	
Yorke Peninsula	Maitland	162	101	Upper Yorke Road (northeast) – Kulpara; Maitland Road (east) – Ardrossan; Port Victoria Road (southwest) – Port Victoria	
Yorke Peninsula	Minlaton	207	129	Yorke Highway (B86) – Ardrossan, Warooka	Southern terminus of highway and route B89
1.000 mi = 1.609 km; 1.000 km = 0.621 mi: Route transition
