= Beetaloo Valley, South Australia =

Beetaloo Valley South Australia
- Coordinates: 33.20°S 138.22°E
- Population: 75 (SAL 2021)
- Postcode(s): 5523
- Location: 16 km (10 mi) north of Crystal Brook; 26 km (16 mi) east of Port Pirie
- LGA(s): Northern Areas Council
- State electorate(s): Stuart
- Federal division(s): Grey
Localities around Beetaloo Valley:
Telowie, Nelshaby	Wirrabara	Stone Hut
Napperby	Beetaloo Valley	Laura
Warnertown	Crystal Brook	Gladstone, Huddleston

Beetaloo Valley is a locality in the Mid North region of South Australia in the southern Flinders Ranges. The Beetaloo Reservoir is in the centre of the locality.
