= Port Pirie Airport =

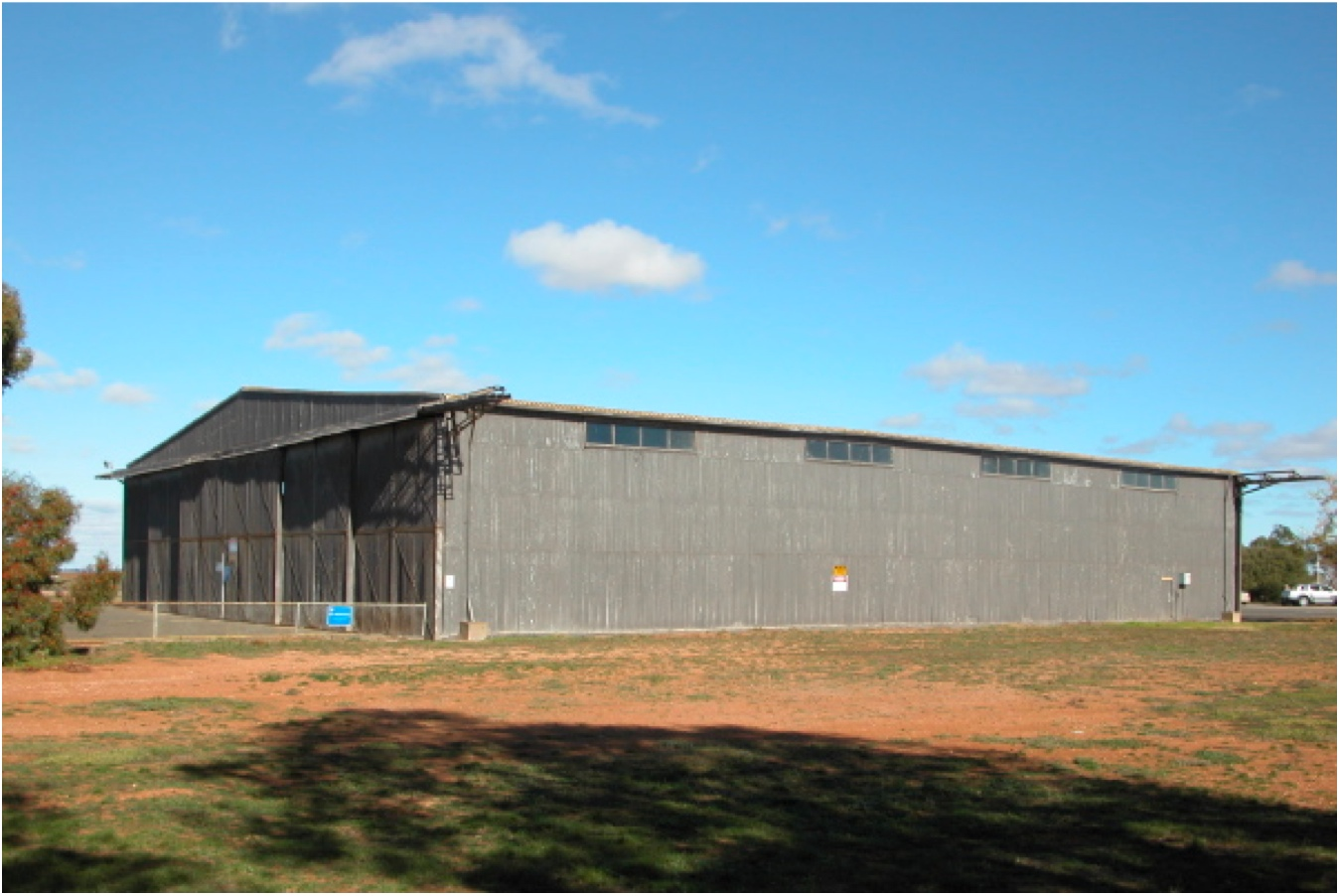
- Bellman hangar at the airport
- IATA: PPI; ICAO: YPIR

Summary
- Airport type: Public
- Operator: Port Pirie Regional Council
- Location: Pirie East, South Australia
- Elevation AMSL: 39 ft / 12 m
- Coordinates: 33°14′20″S 137°59′42″E

Map
- Location in South Australia

Runways
Direction	Length		Surface
Direction	m	ft	Surface
08/26	1,043	3,422	Bitumen
17/35	1,069	3,507	Gravel
03/21	672	2,205	Grass
- Sources: Australian AIP and aerodrome chart

Port Pirie Airport (IATA: PPI, ICAO: YPIR) is an airport that is located 3 nautical miles (5.6 km; 3.5 mi) south of Port Pirie, South Australia, Australia. The airport is owned by the Port Pirie Regional Council.

== History ==
The airfield was a Royal Australian Air Force (RAAF) station and home to No. 2 Bombing and Gunnery School (No. 2 BAGS) during World War II. No. 2 BAGS provided bombing and gunnery training for pilots, air observers and air gunners. No. 2 Operational Training Unit was formed at Port Pirie on 6 April 1942, and operated initially with Wirraways and Fairey Battles at the aerodrome until it moved to Mildura, Victoria in May 1942. No. 2 BAGS was renamed No. 3 Air Observers School in December 1943. After World War II, the station housed No. 5 Central Recovery Depot where aircraft and parts were stored until disposal. The station closed in early 1947, with the aerodrome reverting to civilian use thereafter. A Bellman hangar is still standing at the airport and is in good condition, it remains in use by light aircraft based at the airport.

== See also ==
- List of airports in South Australia
