= Merriton, South Australia =

Merriton South Australia
- Coordinates: 33.434670°S 138.149880°E
- Population: 55 (SAL 2021)
- Postcode(s): 5523
- LGA(s): Port Pirie Regional Council
- Region: Mid North
- County: Victoria
- State electorate(s): Frome
- Federal division(s): Grey
Localities around Merriton:
Wandearah East	Wandearah East; Crystal Brook	Crystal Brook
Wandearah East	Merriton	Crystal Brook
Clements Gap	Redhill	Redhill

Merriton is a locality in South Australia beside the Augusta Highway between Crystal Brook and Redhill. The town was named in the 1870s for the president of the local cricket club, George Merrit, by John Millar, former member of parliament.

== History ==
Merriton was originally a private subdivision of section 97 of the Hundred of Crystal Brook, County of Victoria, at the point just south of where the main road from Clements Gap to Crystal Brook crossed the Broughton River. The name and boundaries for the long-established locality were formalised in 2001.
