= Bungama, South Australia =

Bungama South Australia
- Coordinates: 33.197°S 138.077°E
- Population: 116 (SAL 2021)
- Postcode(s): 5540
- Location: 6 km (4 mi) ESE of Port Pirie; 218 km (135 mi) N of Adelaide
- LGA(s): Port Pirie Regional Council
- State electorate(s): Stuart
- Federal division(s): Grey
Localities around Bungama:
Solomontown	Germein Bay	Napperby
Coonamia	Bungama
Pirie East		Warnertown

Bungama is a locality to the east of Port Pirie in the Mid North region of South Australia. It contains the intersection that is the southern entrance to Port Pirie from the Augusta Highway (Highway 1)) onto Warnertown Road, and is bisected by the Adelaide-Port Augusta railway line. It also contains a regional 275kV electricity substation operated by ElectraNet. Bungama is on the plains to the west of the Southern Flinders Ranges. Bungama is also home to the world's first vanadium flow battery.

The locality was named after the now-unused railway station on the railway from Adelaide to Port Pirie. The station was given a local Aboriginal name meaning good.
