= Eucalyptus percostata =

Rib-capped mallee

Conservation status
- Near Threatened (IUCN 3.1)

Scientific classification
- Kingdom: Plantae
- Clade: Tracheophytes
- Clade: Angiosperms
- Clade: Eudicots
- Clade: Rosids
- Order: Myrtales
- Family: Myrtaceae
- Genus: Eucalyptus
- Species: E. percostata

Binomial name
- Eucalyptus percostata Brooker & P.J.Lang

Species of eucalyptus

Eucalyptus percostata, commonly known as the rib-capped mallee or Devils peak mallee, is a species of mallee that is endemic to South Australia. It has smooth bark, lance-shaped adult leaves, flower buds in groups of seven, creamy white flowers and cup-shaped to conical fruit. It is only known from a few locations in the Flinders Ranges.

== Description ==
Eucalyptus percostata is a mallee that typically grows to a height of 3–10 m (9.8–32.8 ft) and forms a lignotuber. It has smooth whitish bark that is coppery when new. Young plants and coppice regrowth have broadly lance-shaped to broadly egg-shaped leaves that are 50–100 mm (2.0–3.9 in) long and 30–60 mm (1.2–2.4 in) wide. Adult leaves are the same shade of green on both sides, lance-shaped, 70–120 mm (2.8–4.7 in) long and 12–25 mm (0.47–0.98 in) wide tapering to a petiole 10–22 mm (0.39–0.87 in) long. The flower buds are arranged in leaf axils on a peduncle 8–20 mm (0.31–0.79 in) long, the individual buds sessile or on pedicels up to 2 mm (0.079 in) long. Mature buds are pear-shaped, 8–12 mm (0.31–0.47 in) long and 6–7 mm (0.24–0.28 in) wide with a conspicuously ribbed, rounded to conical operculum. Flowering from May to September and the flowers are creamy white. The fruit is a woody, cup-shaped to conical capsule 6–8 mm (0.24–0.31 in) long and 5–9 mm (0.20–0.35 in) wide with the valves near rim level.

== Taxonomy ==
Eucalyptus percostata was first formally described in 1990 by Ian Brooker and Peter Lang in Journal of the Adelaide Botanic Gardens from material collected on a track east of Devils Peak, near Quorn in 1986. The specific epithet (percostata) is from Latin meaning "conspicuously ribbed", referring to the operculum.

== Distribution and habitat ==
Rib-capped mallee grows in woodland and mallee in the southern Flinders Ranges between Quorn and Napperby.

== Conservation status ==
The IUCN Red List assesses the species as Near Threatened.

== See also ==
- List of Eucalyptus species
