= Clements Gap, South Australia =

Clements Gap
- Town
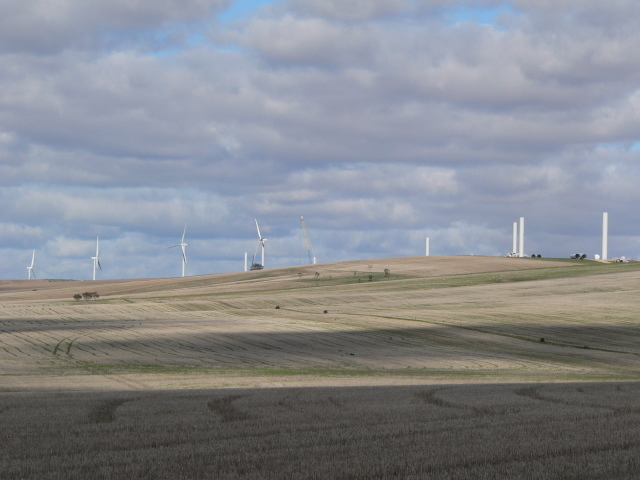
- Clements Gap Wind Farm

- Coordinates: 33.524060°S 138.040390°E
- Country: Australia
- State: South Australia
- LGA: Port Pirie Barunga West
- Location: 16 km (9.9 mi) nw of Redhill

Government
  - State electorate: Narungga
  - Federal division: Grey

Population
  - Total: 54 (SAL 2021)
- Postcode: 5523
- County: County of Daly
Localities around Clements Gap
Wandearah West	Wandearah East	Merriton
Fisherman Bay	Clements Gap	Redhill
Port Broughton	Mundoora	Redhill

Clements Gap is a locality in South Australia's Mid North. The name is a reference to the co-located pass through the northern end of the Barunga Range. The Clements Gap pass in turn is thought to be named after a shepherd in the area prior to 1880, per research by local historian Rodney Cockburn.

The Clements Gap school was opened in 1880 by John Wauchope and closed in 1942.

== See also ==
- Clements Gap Conservation Park
- Clements Gap Wind Farm
- List of cities and towns in South Australia
