= Lake View, South Australia =

Lake View South Australia
- Coordinates: 33.635420°S 138.2297°E
- Population: 11 (SAL 2021)
- Postcode(s): 5555
- Location: 163 km (101 mi) north of Adelaide
- LGA(s): Wakefield Regional Council
- Region: Mid North
- County: Daly
- State electorate(s): Frome
- Federal division(s): Grey
Localities around Lake View:
Collinsfield	Collinsfield; Koolunga	Koolunga
Hope Gap	Lake View	Brinkworth
Hope Gap	Burnsfield	Brinkworth

Lake View (alternatively Lakeview) is a locality in South Australia beside the Augusta Highway between Snowtown and Redhill. The name is from that of the historic railway siding, Lake View Railway Station, within the locality and refers to the string of small salt lakes at the location, beside Barunga East Road.
