= Clements Gap Conservation Park =

Protected area in South Australia

- IUCN category III (natural monument or feature)
- Location within South Australia
- Location: South Australia
- Nearest city: Redhill
- Coordinates: 33.49232°S 138.0761°E
- Area: 7.9 km^{2} (3.1 sq mi)
- Governing body: Department for Environment and Water

Clements Gap Conservation Park is a protected area located in the Mid North of South Australia about 15 kilometres (9.3 mi) west of Redhill, 20 kilometres (12 mi) north east of Port Broughton and 42 metres above sea level. The park preserves an area of natural bushland and the built remnants of a small historic agricultural township, Clements Gap, about 12 kilometres (7.5 mi) east of the Spencer Gulf coast. Maintained by the South Australian Department of Environment, Water and Natural Resources, the park is classified as an IUCN Category III – natural monument or feature. The park is named for the surrounding farming locality of Clements Gap, a reference to the co-located pass through the Barunga Range. The Clements Gap pass in turn is thought to be named after a shepherd in the area prior to 1880, per research by local historian Rodney Cockburn.

== History ==
In 1963 eight sections (439-442 and 565–568) of the Hundred of Mundoora (north east corner) were set aside and designated Mundoora Conservation Park. In 1981 the park was renamed to its present designation.

== See also ==
- Protected areas in South Australia
- Field Naturalists Society of South Australia
