= Warnertown, South Australia =

Warnertown South Australia
- Coordinates: 33°14′01″S 138°07′04″E
- Population: 208 (SAL 2021)
- Postcode(s): 5540
- Time zone: ACST (UTC+9:30)
  - Summer (DST): ACST (UTC+10:30)
- Location: 214 km (133 mi) N of Adelaide city centre; 13 km (8 mi) SE of Port Pirie
- LGA(s): Port Pirie Regional Council
- Region: Yorke and Mid North
- County: Victoria
- State electorate(s): Frome
- Federal division(s): Grey
Localities around Warnertown:
Bungama	Bungama; Napperby	Beetaloo Valley
Bungama; Pirie East	Warnertown	Beetaloo Valley
Nurom	Nurom; Crystal Brook	Crystal Brook
- Footnotes: Adjoining suburbs

Warnertown is a settlement in South Australia. At the 2006 census, Warnertown had a population of 532. It lies on the Augusta Highway between Crystal Brook and Port Pirie. Warnertown is a service centre which is close to Port Pirie but avoids leaving the highway. As such, Warnertown's businesses on the main road consist of a hotel / public bar, bakery, service station and mechanical workshop.
