= Solomontown, South Australia =

Solomontown Port Pirie, South Australia
- Coordinates: 33.185°S 138.017°E
- Population: 1,088 (SAL 2021)
- Postcode(s): 5540
- Elevation: 6 m (20 ft)
- LGA(s): Port Pirie Regional Council
- State electorate(s): Frome
- Federal division(s): Grey
Suburbs around Solomontown:
Germein Bay	Germein Bay	Germein Bay
Port Pirie	Solomontown	Coonamia
Port Pirie	Port Pirie South	Coonamia

Solomontown is a suburb of Port Pirie in South Australia. It was historically a separate town. It was named after Emanuel Solomon, who owned the land that the town developed on.

== Transport ==
Solomontown has the Spencer Highway run from northeast to south through it, and Warnertown Road from Port Pirie towards the Augusta Highway and Adelaide runs northeast to southwest through it. The railway line in to the Port Pirie smelters (and previously to the town stations) runs along the southern boundary of Solomontown. The Solomontown railway station was formerly in the southwest corner of the town. It had a suburban rail service to Port Pirie in 1911. The Port Pirie Junction station was newly built in 1937 as the break-of-gauge junction between the South Australian Railways broad gauge from the south and the Commonwealth Railways standard gauge from the north on the site of the older Solomontown station on the Port Pirie-Cockburn railway line. (officially known as Port Pirie Junction with both names on the signboard) The station was replaced and closed in 1967, and later demolished.

== Community ==
Solomontown Primary School, Solomontown Kindergarten and the Solomontown Cats football and netball teams are based in the town.

== Military History ==
During World War II, Solomontown, now a suburb of Port Pirie, was the location of RAAF No.11 Inland Aircraft Fuel Depot (IAFD), built in 1942 and closed on 14 June 1944. Usually consisting of 4 tanks, 31 fuel depots were built across Australia for the storage and supply of aircraft fuel for the RAAF and the US Army Air Forces at a total cost of £900,000 ($1,800,000).
