= Napperby, South Australia =

Napperby
- Suburb
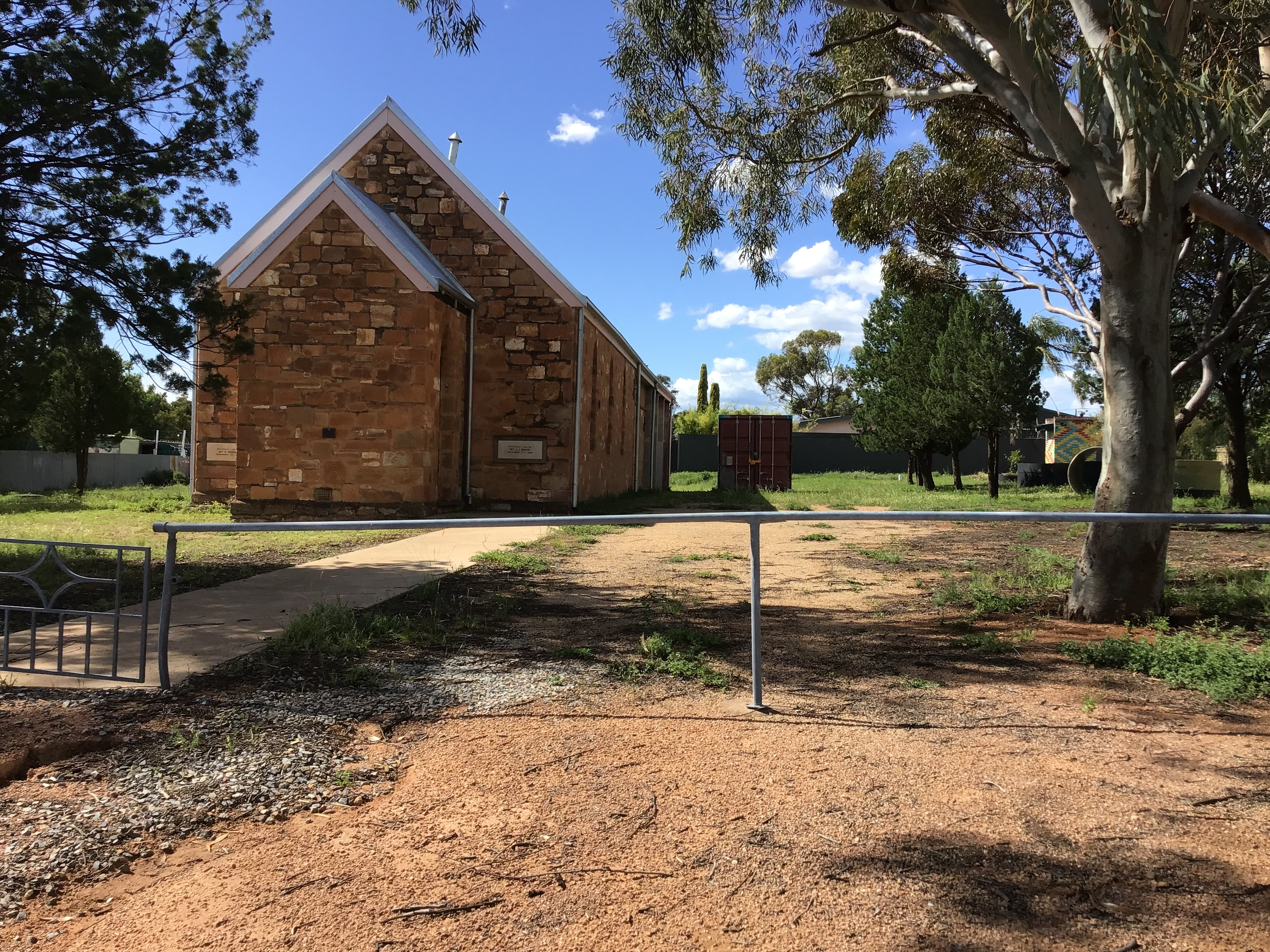
- Former Methodist and Uniting Church

- Coordinates: 33°09′20″S 138°07′03″E
- Country: Australia
- State: South Australia
- Region: Yorke and Mid North
- LGA: Port Pirie Regional Council
- Location: 12 km (7.5 mi) northeast of Port Pirie
- Established: 29 March 1877 (town); 29 June 1995 (locality)

Government
  - State electorate: Frome
  - Federal division: Grey

Population
  - Total: 666 (SAL 2021)
- Time zone: UTC+9:30 (ACST)
  - Summer (DST): UTC+10:30 (ACST)
- County: Victoria
Suburbs around Napperby
Germein Bay	Nelshaby	Beetaloo Valley
Germein Bay; Bungama	Napperby	Beetaloo Valley
Bungama	Bungama; Warnertown	Beetaloo Valley

Napperby is a locality in the Mid North of South Australia in the approach to the lower Flinders Ranges and is near Mount Remarkable National Park and the town of Crystal Brook.

The 2016 Australian census which was conducted in August 2016 reports that Napperby had a population of 665 of which 284 lived in its town centre.

Napperby is located within the federal division of Grey, the state electoral district of Frome and the local government area of the Port Pirie Regional Council.
