= Hundred of Howe =

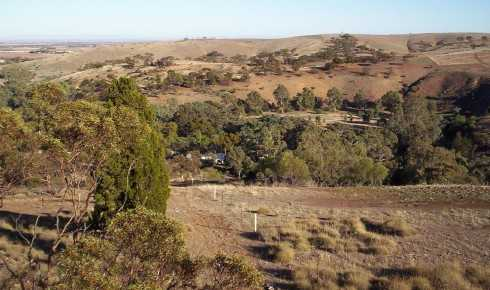
the area around the hundred of Howe.

The Hundred of Howe is a cadastral unit of hundred located in the Mid North of South Australia in the approach to the lower Flinders Ranges. It is one of the hundreds of the County of Victoria and lies to the north of the town of Crystal Brook, South Australia.
