= Crystal Brook, South Australia =

Crystal Brook
- Town
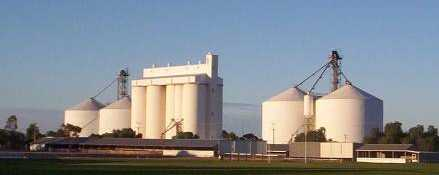
- The rising sun catching the Crystal Brook grain silos on a clear winter's morning, with the town sports oval in the foreground, 2008

- Coordinates: 33°21′0″S 138°12′0″E
- Country: Australia
- State: South Australia
- Region: Mid North
- LGA: Port Pirie Regional Council
- Location: 197 km (122 mi) N of Adelaide; 29 km (18 mi) SE of Port Pirie; 18 km (11 mi) SW of Gladstone
- Established: 1873

Government
  - State electorate: Stuart
  - Federal division: Grey
- Elevation: 115 m (377 ft)

Population
  - Total: 1,322 (UCL 2021)
- Postcode: 5523
- County: Southern Flinders Ranges
- Mean max temp: 24 °C (75 °F)
- Mean min temp: 6 °C (43 °F)
- Annual rainfall: 445 mm (17.5 in)
Localities around Crystal Brook
Warnertown	Beetaloo Valley	Gladstone
Nurom; Wandearah East	Crystal Brook	Huddleston; Narridy
Merriton	Redhill	Koolunga

Crystal Brook is a town in the Mid North of South Australia, 197 kilometres north of the capital, Adelaide. According to the 2021 Census, the population of the town was 1,322. Crystal Brook is in a very picturesque location, being at the start of the Flinders Ranges. The town has multiple viewing points and parks. It was named after the spring-fed creek next to which it was founded.

Crystal Brook is the second largest town after the city of Port Pirie in the Southern Flinders Ranges area. The shady peppercorn trees grace the main street, Bowman Street. The area where the present town is now was founded in 1839 by Edward John Eyre who was passing through the region. He named it after the beautiful sparkling clear water and named it 'Chrystal Brook'.

Crystal Brook is 197 kilometres (122 mi) north of Adelaide. The town has had some growth over the past year or two with more proposed job opportunities in the region. Crystal Brook is situated on Goyder's Line near the border of two climate systems. The township of Crystal Brook is surrounded by an intense farming region. As the town has experienced some growth in the past few years it has pushed housing development to the western side of the original township and across the creek.

The town benefits from a temperate Mediterranean climate zone, making possible slightly more intense farming in the region. To the south to south-east and west lies more intense farming and to the north-west lies some marginal, semi-arid farmland.

It is home to nearby Bowman Park, a nature preserve that is situated in the Crystal Brook Valley and has an abundance of wildlife and shady camping spots right next to the Crystal Brook Creek. The park contains history that dated back to the 1800s. The original homestead that belonged to the Bowman Brothers, which the park was named after, is there overlooking the Crystal Brook.

Summers in Crystal Brook are warm to hot and can be mostly dry. Winters are wet and cold with daytime temps reaching just average 13 degrees Celsius or less and nighttime temps around 5 degrees Celsius. Many days are overcast and drizzle.

== History ==
The administrative land division the Hundred of Crystal Brook was proclaimed in 1871 in the vicinity of the confluence of the Rocky River and Broughton River. The township, near the eponymous Broughton River tributary, Crystal Brook, was surveyed in August 1874 and officially proclaimed on 12 November that year.

=== Local government ===
The District Council of Crystal Brook was established in 1882. It amalgamated with the District Council of Redhill in 1988 to form the District Council of Crystal Brook-Redhill which continued to be seated at Crystal Brook. From 1997 Crystal Brook has been locally governed by the Port Pirie Regional Council following a merger between Crystal Brook-Redhill and the Port Pirie City councils.

=== Military history ===
During World War II, Crystal Brook was the location of RAAF No.31 Inland Aircraft Fuel Depot (IAFD), built in 1942 and closed on 14 June 1944. Usually consisting of four tanks, 31 such fuel depots were built throughout Australia for the storage and supply of aircraft fuel for the RAAF and the US Army Air Forces, at a total cost of £900,000 ($1,800,000).

== Infrastructure ==
=== Water ===
Crystal Brook (or creek) supplied water to the town until 1890 when the Beetaloo Reservoir was completed, which at the time was the largest concrete dam in the southern hemisphere.

=== Broadband ===
Broadband internet became available at Crystal Brook on 16 April 2005 after lobbying from residents. Both ADSL and ADSL2+ speeds are available to residential and business customers. National Broadband Network (NBN) wired services for the township became available on 7 October 2016. The old ADSL and PSTN infrastructure is expected to be turned off about 13 April 2018. Free Wi-Fi is provided by the local council in the main street, for the use of travelers and locals. NBN wireless broadband and satellite is available outside of the township area.

=== Transport ===
Crystal Brook serves as a major junction on the Sydney–Perth and the Adelaide–Darwin railway lines, both sharing the same approximately 530 kilometres (329 mi) of track between Crystal Brook and Tarcoola. There is a triangular junction at Crystal Brook which joins Tarcoola, Adelaide and Sydney and sees regular trains each day in all directions.

== Entertainment and tourism ==
=== Crystal Brook Show ===
The Crystal Brook Show has been held annually since the early 1880s. The 2020 and 2021 show has been cancelled due to COVID-19 social distancing requirements.

=== Heysen Trail ===
The town lies on the Heysen Trail, a 1,200 kilometres (746 mi)-long walking trail from Cape Jervis to Parachilna Gorge.

Close to the north–south midpoint of the trail, Crystal Brook marks a change in climate. Hot, dry summers and mild winters lie to the north, and more temperate conditions to the south.

=== Sport ===
Crystal Brook's sporting facilities cater for hockey, tennis, croquet, golf, lawn bowls, netball, basketball, swimming, gymnasium exercise, junior soccer, horse riding, motocross, football and cricket.

In regional competitions the town colours are red and white, with most teams known as 'The Roosters'.

The Crystal Brook Football Club won the Northern Areas (Australian Rules) Football Association premiership for a record 19th time in 2012 and the town has twice staged a round of the Australian motocross championships.

== Notable people ==
- Arthur Percy Sullivan – recipient of the Victoria Cross
- Rob Kerin – premier of South Australia between 22 October 2001 and 5 March 2002
