= Risdon Park South, South Australia =

Risdon Park South South Australia
- Coordinates: 33°12′32″S 137°59′17″E
- Population: 2,230 (2021)
- Postcode(s): 5540
- Time zone: ACST (UTC+9:30)
  - Summer (DST): ACST (UTC+10:30)
- LGA(s): Port Pirie Regional Council
- State electorate(s): Frome
- Federal division(s): Grey

Risdon Park South is a locality in the Mid North region of South Australia, Australia and a suburb of Port Pirie.

Risdon Park South is located within the federal division of Grey, the state electoral district of Frome and the local government area of the Port Pirie Regional Council.

== Demographics ==
As of the 2021 Australian census, 2,230 people resided in Risdon Park South, up from 2,138 in the 2016 census. The median age of persons in Risdon Park South was 41 years. There were more males than females, with 51.8% of the population male and 48.2% female. The average household size was 2.4 people per household.
