= Collinsfield, South Australia =

Collinsfield South Australia
- Coordinates: 33°36′50″S 138°12′18″E
- Population: 6 (2021)
- Postcode(s): 5555
- LGA(s): Port Pirie Regional Council
- State electorate(s): Narungga
- Federal division(s): Grey

Collinsfield is a locality in the Port Pirie Regional Council in the Mid North of South Australia, Australia.

== Demographics ==
As of the 2021 Australian census, 6 people resided in Collinsfield, as well as in the 2016 census. The median age of persons in Collinsfield was 57 years. There were more males than females, with 62.5% of the population male and 37.5% female. The average household size was 0 people per household.
