= Port Pirie West, South Australia =

Port Pirie West
- Suburb
- Interactive map of Port Pirie West
- Coordinates: 33°10′33″S 137°59′28″E
- Country: Australia
- State: South Australia
- City: Port Pirie
- LGA: Port Pirie Regional Council

Government
  - State electorate: Frome
  - Federal division: Grey

Population
  - Total: 2,556 (2021)
- Time zone: UTC+9:30 (ACST)
  - Summer (DST): UTC+10:30 (ACST)
- Postcode: 5540

Port Pirie West is a locality in the Mid North region of South Australia, Australia and a suburb of Port Pirie.

Port Pirie West is located within the federal division of Grey, the state electoral district of Frome and the local government area of the Port Pirie Regional Council.

== Demographics ==
As of the 2021 Australian census, 2,556 people resided in Port Pirie West, down from 2,618 in the 2016 census. The median age of persons in Port Pirie West was 45 years. There were fewer males than females, with 49% of the population male and 51% female. The average household size was 2 people per household.
