= Hundred of Napperby =

The Hundred of Napperby is a small farming community and a cadastral hundred situated in the Mid North region of South Australia. It is more or less 6.8 mi (11 kms) east of Port Pirie, located beside the western face of the Southern Flinders Ranges.

History

The Hundred of Napperby was declared on June 11, 1874, by Governor Anthony Musgrave and named after a term from the local Indigenous language. Initially part of the pastoral lease held by the Bowman Brothers, the land was later subdivided for agricultural settlement. The first landholder, Thomas Brown Turner, acquired land in the hundred in 1874. The hundred covers an area of 94 square miles (243 km²) and lies just within Goyder’s Line, which delineates arable land from pastoral land in South Australia.

Geography

Located in the Mid North of South Australia, the Hundred of Napperby supports wheat farming as its primary agricultural activity. The hundred is adjacent to the Wapma Thura–Southern Flinders Ranges National Park, established in 2021, which includes the Napperby Block. It is also near Mount Remarkable National Park and the town of Crystal Brook. The region is known for its scenic views, particularly along Scenic Drive, which overlooks Spencer Gulf.

Community

The town of Napperby, located within the hundred, had a population of 665 in the 2016 Australian Census, with 284 residents in the town center. The community features a primary school with an attached preschool, a public phone box, and a plaque commemorating the first settlers. Historically, water scarcity was a challenge, with settlers relying on local creeks, wells, and dams for water supply.

Infrastructure

The hundred was historically served by a railway, with a station at Warnertown mistakenly labeled as “Napperby Station,” causing confusion among residents and visitors. The area is accessible via roads connecting to nearby Port Pirie and other regional centers.
