= Nurom, South Australia =

Nurom South Australia
- Coordinates: 33°20′1″S 138°5′53″E
- Population: 33 (2021)
- Postcode(s): 5523
- LGA(s): Port Pirie Regional Council
- State electorate(s): Stuart
- Federal division(s): Grey

Nurom is a locality in the Port Pirie Regional Council in the Mid North region of South Australia, Australia.

== Demographics ==
As of the 2021 Australian census, 33 people resided in Nurom, up from 31 in the 2016 census. The median age of persons in Nurom was 54 years. There were more males than females, with 51.7% of the population male and 48.3% female. The average household size was 3 people per household.
