= Nelshaby, South Australia =

Nelshaby South Australia
- Coordinates: 33°7′45″S 138°6′43″E
- Population: 188 (2021)
- Postcode(s): 5540
- LGA(s): Port Pirie Regional Council
- State electorate(s): Stuart
- Federal division(s): Grey

Nelshaby is a locality in the Port Pirie Regional Council in the Mid North region of South Australia, Australia.

== Demographics ==
As of the 2021 Australian census, 188 people resided in Nelshaby, up from 181 in the 2016 census. The median age of persons in Nelshaby was 51 years. There were more males than females, with 54.1% of the population male and 49.9% female. The average household size was 2.4 people per household.
