= Hundred of Pirie =

The Hundred of Pirie is a cadastral unit of hundred located in the Mid North of South Australia in the approach to the lower Flinders Ranges. It is one of the hundreds of the County of Victoria. The principal township of the hundred is Port Pirie.
