= Pirie East =

Pirie East South Australia
- Coordinates: 33°14′56″S 138°1′12″E
- Population: 37 (SAL 2021)
- Postcode(s): 5540
- LGA(s): Port Pirie Regional Council
- State electorate(s): Stuart
- Federal division(s): Grey

Pirie East is a locality in the Port Pirie Regional Council in the Mid North region of South Australia, Australia.

== Demographics ==
As of the 2021 Australian census, 37 people resided in Pirie East, down from 46 in the 2016 census. The median age of persons in Pirie East was 50 years. There were more males than females, with 60% of the population male and 40% female. The average household size was 2.5 people per household.
