= Port Pirie Regional Council =

Coordinates: 33°10′37″S 138°00′37″E

- Local government area
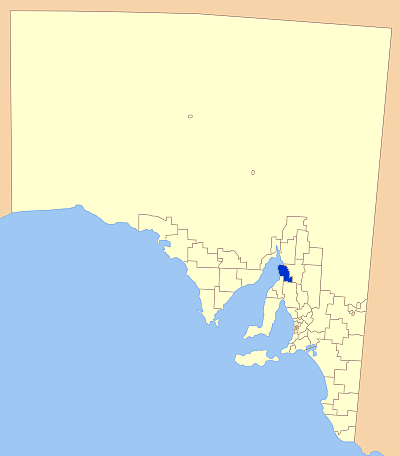
- Location of Port Pirie Regional Council

- Interactive map of Port Pirie Regional Council
- Country: Australia
- State: South Australia
- Region: Yorke and Mid North
- Established: 17 March 1997
- Council seat: Port Pirie

Government
  - Mayor: Leon Stephens
  - State electorate: Stuart Narungga
  - Federal division: Grey

Area
  - Total: 1,761 km^{2} (680 sq mi)

Population
  - Total: 17,282 (LGA 2021)
- Website: Port Pirie Regional Council
LGAs around Port Pirie Regional Council
| | Mount Remarkable |
| | Port Pirie Regional Council | Northern Areas |
| Barunga West | Wakefield |

The Port Pirie Regional Council (PPRC) is a local government area in South Australia, focused on the city of Port Pirie. It has a population of about 18,000 people. The council's main administrative facilities and works depot can be found in Port Pirie; it also have a rural office in Crystal Brook. In addition to Port Pirie, the municipality also includes the surrounding towns and localities of Bungama, Collinsfield, Coonamia, Crystal Brook, Koolunga, Lower Broughton, Merriton, Napperby, Nelshaby, Pirie East, Port Davis, Port Pirie South, Port Pirie West, Redhill, Risdon Park, Risdon Park South, Solomontown, Wandearah East, Wandearah West and Warnertown, and part of Clements Gap, and Mundoora.

The Port Pirie Regional Council was created in 1997, and resulted from two council mergers in short succession. The City of Port Pirie amalgamated with the District Council of Pirie on 1 July 1996 to become the Port Pirie City and District Council. The Port Pirie City and District Council then amalgamated with the District Council of Crystal Brook-Redhill on 17 March 1997 to become the Port Pirie City and Districts Council. A name change to Port Pirie Regional Council occurred on 1 July 1998.

== Councillors ==
| Ward | Councillor | Notes |
|---|---|---|
| Mayor | Leon Stephens | Elected Q4-2018 |
| Councillors | Joby Connor | |
| Councillors | Dino Gadaleta | |
| Councillors | Michael Hopgood | |
| Councillors | Kendall Jackson | |
| Councillors | Matt Perks | |
| Councillors | Ali Gulin | |
| Councillors | Jack Keain | |
| Councillors | Neville Wilson | |
| Councillors | Alan Zubrinich | |

The Port Pirie Regional Council has a directly-elected mayor.

== Mayors of the Port Pirie Regional Council ==
- Kenneth Francis Madigan (1997–2003)
- Geoff Brock (2003–2009)
- Brenton Vanstone (2009–2014)
- John Rohde (2014–2018)
- Leon Stephens (2018–present)
