= Wandearah East, South Australia =

Wandearah West South Australia
- Coordinates: 33°23′0″S 138°4′0″E
- Population: 95 (2021)
- Postcode(s): 5523
- Time zone: ACST (UTC+9:30)
  - Summer (DST): ACST (UTC+10:30)
- LGA(s): Port Pirie Regional Council
- State electorate(s): Frome
- Federal division(s): Grey

Wandearah East is a locality in the Mid North region of South Australia, Australia and a suburb of Port Pirie.

Wandearah East is located within the federal division of Grey, the state electoral district of Frome and the local government area of the Port Pirie Regional Council.

== Demographics ==
As of the 2021 Australian census, 95 people resided in Wandearah East, down from 97 in the 2016 census. The median age of persons in Wandearah East was 49 years. There were more males than females, with 51.0% of the population male and 49.0% female. The average household size was 2.7 people per household.
