= Port Pirie =

- City
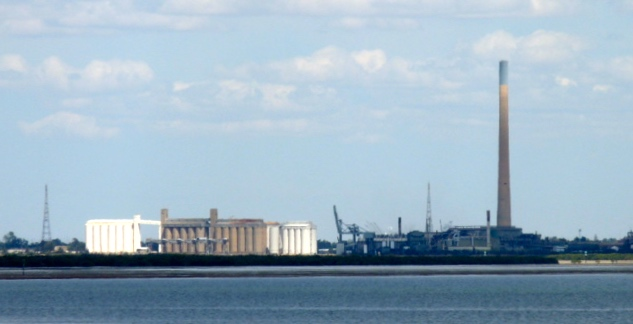
- The lead smelter and grain silos at the wharf of Port Pirie

- Coordinates: 33°11′9″S 138°1′1″E
- Country: Australia
- State: South Australia
- Region: Mid North
- LGA: Port Pirie Regional Council
- Location: 223 km (139 mi) from Adelaide
- Established: 1845

Government
  - State electorate: Stuart
  - Federal division: Grey (O'Donoghue)
- Elevation: 4 m (13 ft)

Population
  - Total: 13,896 (2021 census)
- Time zone: UTC+9:30 (ACST)
  - Summer (DST): UTC+10:30 (ACDT)
- Postcode: 5540
- Mean max temp: 24.4 °C (75.9 °F)
- Mean min temp: 12.7 °C (54.9 °F)
- Annual rainfall: 345 mm (13.6 in)

Port Pirie is a small city on the east coast of the Spencer Gulf in South Australia, 223 km (139 mi) north of the state capital, Adelaide. Port Pirie is the largest city and the main retail centre of the Mid North region of South Australia. The city has an expansive history which dates back to 1845. Port Pirie was the first proclaimed regional city in South Australia, and is currently the second most important and second busiest port in SA.

At the 2021 Census, Port Pirie had a population of 13,896. Port Pirie is the eighth most populous city in South Australia after Adelaide, Mount Gambier, Gawler, Mount Barker, Whyalla, Murray Bridge and Port Lincoln.

The city's economy is dominated by one of the world's largest lead smelters, operated by Nyrstar. It also produces refined silver, copper, acid, gold and various other by-products.

In 2014, the smelter underwent a $650 million upgrade, of which $291 million was underwritten by the state government to replace some of the old existing plant and to reduce airborne lead emissions drastically. Regardless of these upgrades, blood lead levels in young children continue to rise. In 2021 a report from the South Australian Health Department found an average blood level of 7.3 μg/dL in young children, compared to a finding of 5.3 μg/dL in 2014, and an upward trend of airborne lead levels.

== History ==
Prior to British settlement, the location that became Port Pirie was occupied by the Nukunu Aboriginal people, who called it Tarparrie, suspected to mean "Muddy Creek". The first European to see the location was Matthew Flinders in 1802, as he explored the Spencer Gulf by boat. The first land discovery of the location by a European was by the explorer Edward Eyre, who explored regions around Port Augusta. John Horrocks also discovered a pass through the Flinders Ranges to the coast, now named Horrocks Pass.

The town was originally called Samuel's Creek after the discovery of Muddy Creek by Samuel Germein. In 1846, Port Pirie Creek was named by Governor Robe after the John Pirie, which, while transporting sheep from Bowman's Run near Crystal Brook, became the first vessel to navigate the creek. In 1848, Matthew Smith and Emanuel Solomon bought 85 acres (34 ha) and subdivided it into the township to be known as Port Pirie. Little development occurred on site, and, by the late 1860s, there were only three woolsheds on the riverfront.

The locality was surveyed as a government town in December 1871 by Charles Hope Harris. The thoroughfares and streets were named after the family of George Goyder, Surveyor General of South Australia. In 1873, the land of Solomon and Smith was re-surveyed and named Solomontown. On 28 September 1876, with a population of 947, Port Pirie was declared a municipality.

With the discovery of rich ore bearing silver, lead and zinc at Broken Hill in 1883, and the completion of a narrow gauge railway allowing transit from Port Pirie to the Broken Hill field in 1888, the economic activities of the town underwent profound change. In 1889, a lead smelter was built by the British Blocks company to treat the Broken Hill ore. BHP initially leased the smelter from British Blocks, but began constructing its own smelter from 1892. In 1913, the Russian consul-general Alexander Abaza reported that Port Pirie had a population of more than 500 Russians, mostly Ossetians, who had come to work at the smelter. At that time the town supported a Russian-language school and library.

In 1915, the smelter was taken over by Broken Hill Associated Smelters (BHAS) – a joint venture of companies operating in Broken Hill. Led by the Collins House Group, by 1934 BHAS became the biggest lead smelter in the world. The smelter gradually passed to Pasminco, then Zinifex, and since 2007 has been operated by Nyrstar.

By 1921, the town's population had grown to 9,801, living in 2,308 occupied dwellings, including 62 boarding houses to cater for the labour demands at both the smelter and the increasingly busy waterfront.

During World War II (1941–1943), a Bombing and Gunnery school (2BAGS) was established by the Royal Air Force at Port Pirie. 22 men lost their lives there during training exercises. It was re-designated the 3 Aerial Observers School (3AOS) in December 1943.

In August 1955, the purpose-built Port Pirie Uranium Treatment Complex, operated by the state government under a contract signed by the Commonwealth and SA Governments with the Combined Development Agency of the UK and US, began operations. It processed uranium ore, mostly from the Radium Hill mine east of the Flinders Ranges, and also from Myponga (Wild Dog Hill), south of Adelaide. Sulphuric acid leaching was used on the ore to dissolve the uranium, which eventually emerged as yellowcake after further processing. There were four thickening tanks, used to separated the uranium solids from the waste material, and the thickened solids were pumped into the tailings dams. The plant produced over 860 tonnes of yellowcake, which was sold to the governments of the UK and US. Radium Hill mine closed in December 1961, and with the expiry of the CDA contract at on 31 December 1961, the Port Pirie uranium treatment complex was closed in February 1962.

=== Heritage listings ===
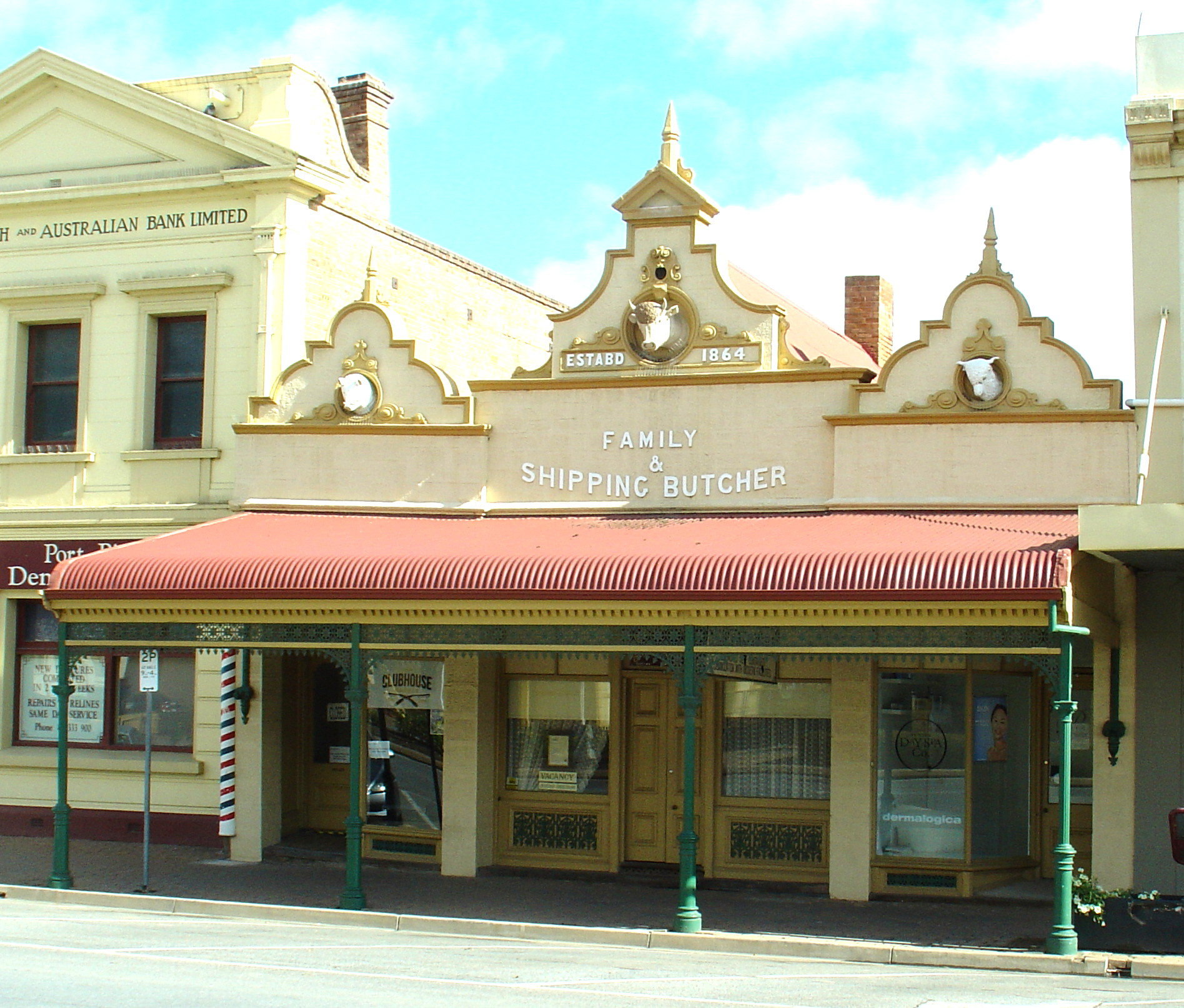
The former Sampson's butcher shop at 64-68 Ellen Street has been converted into a residence.

The city is characterised by an attractive main street and some interesting and unusual historic buildings. Heritage-listed sites include:

- 1 Alexander Street: Barrier Chambers Offices
- 32 Ellen Street: Adelaide Steamship Company Building
- 64–68 Ellen Street: Sampson's Butcher Shop
- 69–71 Ellen Street: Port Pirie Customs House
- 73–77 Ellen Street: Port Pirie (Ellen Street) railway station
- 79–81 Ellen Street: Port Pirie Post Office
- 85 Ellen Street: Development Board Building
- 94 Ellen Street: Sample Rooms, rear of Portside Tavern
- 134 Ellen Street: Family Hotel
- 32 Florence Street: Carn Brae
- 50–52 Florence Street: Waterside Workers' Federation Building
- 105 Gertrude Street: Good Samaritan Catholic Convent School
- Memorial Drive: Second World War Memorial Gates
- 5 Norman Street: AMP Society Building, Port Pirie

== Demographics ==
In the 2021 census, the population of the Port Pirie urban area was 13,896. Approximately 51.0% of the population were female, 85.9% were Australian born, and 5.2% were Aboriginal and/or Torres Strait Islander people.

Port Pirie has significant Italian and Greek communities.

In 2021, the most popular industries for employment were copper, silver, lead and zinc smelting and refining (11.0%), non-psychiatric hospitals (6.0%), residential aged care (4.3%), other social assistance services (4.2%) and supermarket and grocery stores (3.9%). The unemployment rate was 7.7%. The median weekly household income was A$1044 per week. 48.5% of the population identified with no religion, while 21.0% identified themselves as Catholic.

== Geography ==
Port Pirie is at an elevation of 4 metres above sea level. It is approximately 8 kilometres (5.0 mi) inland, on the Pirie River, which is a tidal saltwater inlet from Spencer Gulf. It is on the coastal plain between Spencer Gulf to the west, and the Flinders Ranges to the east.

=== Climate ===
Port Pirie has a hot semi-arid climate (Köppen: BSh), with hot, dry summers and mild to cool, somewhat wetter winters. The town is above Goyder's Line, and is surrounded by mallee scrub. Maximum temperatures range from 32.0 °C (89.6 °F) in January to 16.4 °C (61.5 °F) in July, and minima from 17.9 °C (64.2 °F) in February to 7.7 °C (45.9 °F) in July. Annual rainfall is low, averaging 345.9 mm (13.62 in), with a maximum in winter. There are 78.3 precipitation days, 125 clear days and 100 cloudy days annually. Extreme temperatures have ranged from 46.3 °C (115.3 °F) on 4 January 1979 to −1.7 °C (28.9 °F) on 27 June 1958.

Climate data for Port Pirie (33º10'12"S, 138º00'36"E, 2 m AMSL) (1877–2012, extremes 1957–2012)
Month	Jan	Feb	Mar	Apr	May	Jun	Jul	Aug	Sep	Oct	Nov	Dec	Year
Record high °C (°F)	46.3 (115.3)	45.5 (113.9)	42.5 (108.5)	37.7 (99.9)	31.0 (87.8)	25.5 (77.9)	26.5 (79.7)	30.0 (86.0)	35.0 (95.0)	39.5 (103.1)	44.0 (111.2)	44.6 (112.3)	46.3 (115.3)
Mean daily maximum °C (°F)	32.0 (89.6)	31.8 (89.2)	29.4 (84.9)	24.8 (76.6)	20.4 (68.7)	17.1 (62.8)	16.4 (61.5)	18.1 (64.6)	21.3 (70.3)	24.5 (76.1)	27.7 (81.9)	30.0 (86.0)	24.5 (76.0)
Mean daily minimum °C (°F)	17.7 (63.9)	17.9 (64.2)	16.0 (60.8)	13.2 (55.8)	10.7 (51.3)	8.4 (47.1)	7.7 (45.9)	8.2 (46.8)	9.8 (49.6)	11.9 (53.4)	14.4 (57.9)	16.3 (61.3)	12.7 (54.8)
Record low °C (°F)	4.4 (39.9)	7.1 (44.8)	7.4 (45.3)	4.8 (40.6)	−0.6 (30.9)	−1.7 (28.9)	−0.6 (30.9)	0.6 (33.1)	0.3 (32.5)	1.1 (34.0)	1.1 (34.0)	4.4 (39.9)	−1.7 (28.9)
Average precipitation mm (inches)	18.6 (0.73)	17.8 (0.70)	18.6 (0.73)	27.5 (1.08)	38.2 (1.50)	40.7 (1.60)	33.9 (1.33)	34.9 (1.37)	35.5 (1.40)	33.3 (1.31)	24.1 (0.95)	23.0 (0.91)	345.9 (13.62)
Average precipitation days (≥ 0.2 mm)	3.1	2.6	3.3	5.3	8.3	10.2	10.6	10.6	8.1	6.9	5.2	4.1	78.3
Average afternoon relative humidity (%)	36	39	40	45	57	63	60	53	48	43	41	39	47
Average dew point °C (°F)	11.7 (53.1)	11.9 (53.4)	11.0 (51.8)	9.6 (49.3)	9.8 (49.6)	8.5 (47.3)	7.3 (45.1)	6.7 (44.1)	7.6 (45.7)	7.8 (46.0)	9.6 (49.3)	10.6 (51.1)	9.3 (48.8)
Source: Bureau of Meteorology (1877–2012 normals, extremes 1957–2012)

== Transport ==
Port Pirie is 5 km (3 mi) off the Augusta Highway. It is serviced by Port Pirie Airport, six kilometres south of the city.

=== Railways ===
The first railway in Port Pirie opened in 1875 when the South Australian Railways 1,067 mm (3 ft 6 in) gauge Port Pirie-Cockburn line opened to Gladstone, ultimately being extended to Broken Hill. The original Ellen Street station was located on the street with the track running down the middle. The station today is occupied by the Port Pirie National Trust Museum.

In 1937, it became a break-of-gauge station when the broad gauge Adelaide-Redhill line was extended to Port Pirie. At the same time the Commonwealth Railways standard gauge Trans-Australian Railway was extended south from Port Augusta to terminate at the new Port Pirie Junction station where it met the broad gauge line, in the suburb of Solomontown.

As far back as 1943, a plan existed to build a new station to remove trains from Ellen Street. As part of the gauge conversion of the Port Pirie to Broken Hill line, Mary Elie Street station was built to replace both Ellen Street and Port Pirie Junction stations.

When opened, the new station was the meeting point for the Commonwealth Railways and South Australian Railways networks with through trains changing locomotives and crews, so the disadvantages were not as notable. However, after both became part of Australian National in July 1975 and trains began to operate in and out with the same locomotives, trains began to operate via Coonamia station on the outskirts of the city.

Mary Ellie Street station was eventually closed in the 1990s and in 2009 was redeveloped as the city's library. Until 2012, a GM class locomotive and three carriages were stabled at the platform.

A freight line continues to operate into Port Pirie, feeding the metals plant with raw materials from Broken Hill, and transporting the processed material to Adelaide. This line is managed by Bowmans Rail.

=== Sea transport ===
Port Pirie's marine facilities, managed by Flinders Ports, handle up to 100 ship visits annually, up to Handymax size, for commodities such as mineral concentrates, refined lead and zinc, coal, grain, and general cargo.

=== Bridge to nowhere ===
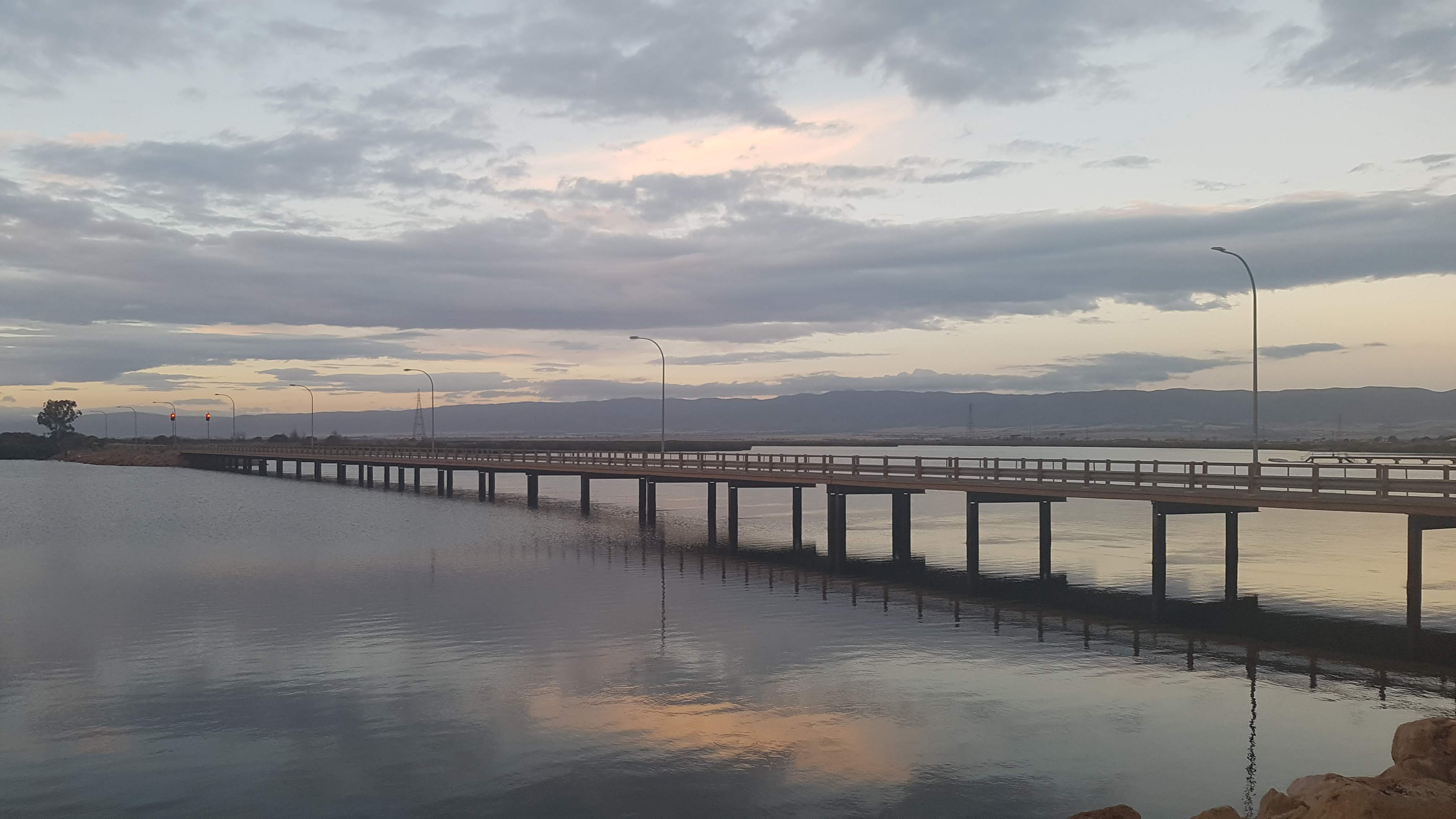
John Pirie Bridge

John Pirie Bridge, locally known as "the bridge to nowhere", was built in the 1970s to encourage development of industry on the other side of Port Pirie Creek. Construction cost $410,000 and lasted 26 weeks. It was officially named the John Pirie Bridge in 1980. The land across the bridge remains undeveloped.

== Economy ==
The main industries are the smelting of metals, and the operation of silos to hold grain.

As of 2020, Port Pirie is the locality of the largest lead smelter and refinery in the southern hemisphere; a lead smelter has been there since the 1880s. The owner since 2007, Nyrstar, is the city's main employer, and high blood lead levels in the local population are an ongoing concern. In 2006 Zinifex formed a joint venture with Umicore to create Nyrstar, which owns the smelter, with the intention that it would eventually be an entity separate from the parent companies.

=== Waterfront development ===
The PPRC completed a major redevelopment of its foreshore area in 2014 including the construction of the Solomontown Beach Plaza, opening up Beach abroad to through traffic, replacing lighting along the beach and improving security.

== Efforts to combat lead poisoning ==
Lead smelters contribute to several environmental problems, especially raised lead levels in the blood of some of the town population. The problem is particularly significant in many children who have grown up in the area. A state government project addressed this. Nyrstar plans to progressively reduce lead in blood levels such that ultimately 95% of all children meet the national goal of 10 micrograms per decilitre. This has been known as the "tenby10" project. Community lead in blood levels in children are now at less than half the level that they were in the mid 1980s.

The Port Pirie smelter conducted a project to reduce lead levels in children to less than 10 micrograms per decilitre by the end of 2010.

"The goal we are committed to achieving is for at least 95% of our children aged 0 to 4 to have a blood lead level below ten micrograms per decilitre of blood (the first ten in tenby10) by the end of 2010" (the second ten in tenby10).

Higher concentrations of lead have been found in the organs of bottlenose dolphins stranded near the lead smelter, compared to dolphins stranded elsewhere in South Australia. The health impacts of these metals on dolphins has been examined and some associations between high metal concentrations and kidney toxicity were noted.

== Education ==
Port Pirie has many educational institutions, including John Pirie Secondary School (years 7–12), St Mark's College (Foundation – year 12), Mid North Christian College (reception – year 12), many preschools and primary schools, and a TAFE campus (adult education).

Risdon Park High School (formerly Port Pirie Technical High School) was a co-ed state school. In 1973, Port Pire Technical High School changed its name to Ridson Park High School, and in 1995 the school merged with Port Pirie High School forming John Pirie Secondary School.

== Culture ==
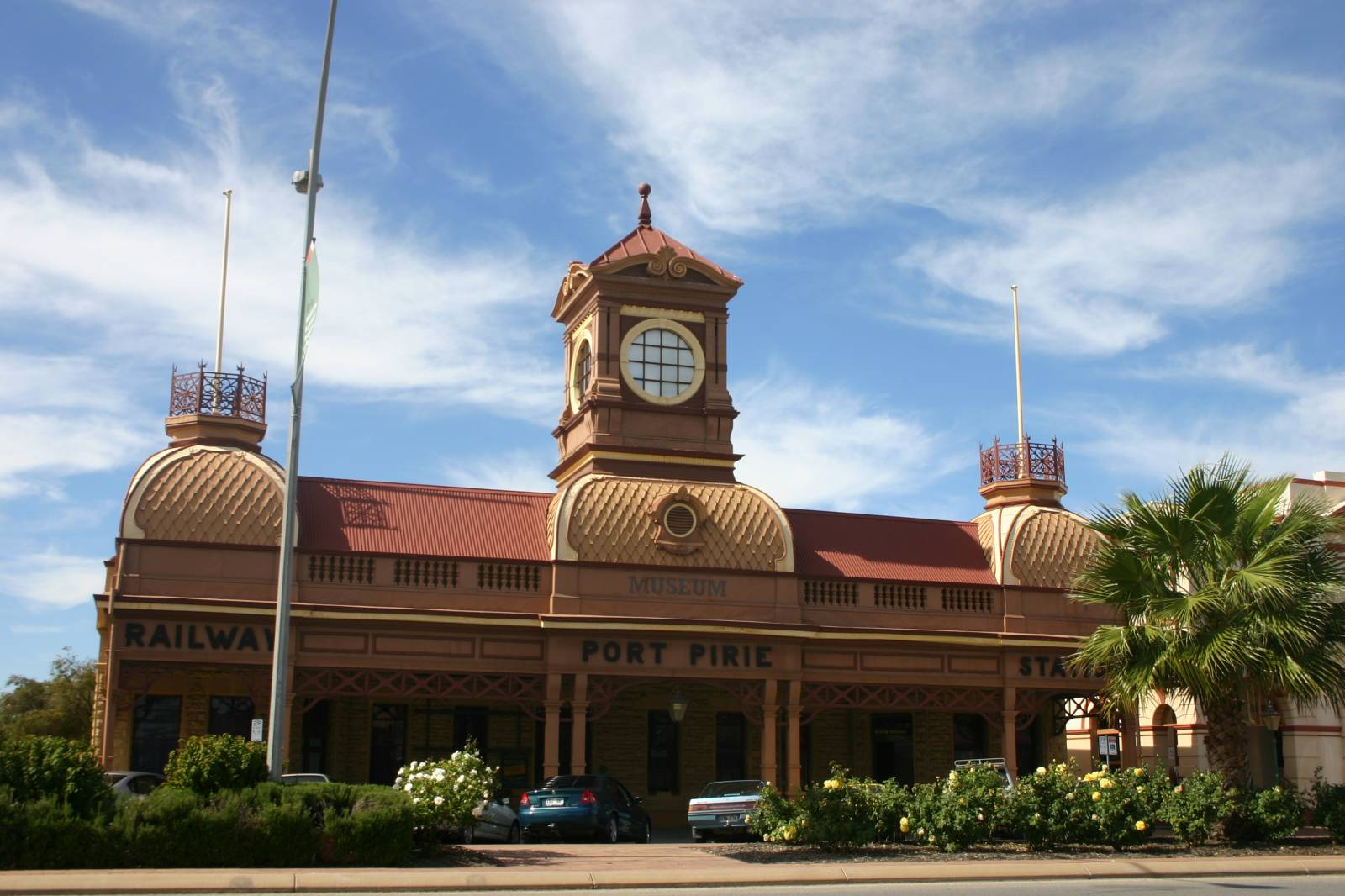
The former Ellen Street railway station, now a museum

Port Pirie is home to the Port Pirie National Trust Museum and Memorial Park, and the Port Pirie Regional Art Gallery also serves the regional community.

Every September and October the city hosts a country music festival.

The Keith Michell Theatre, within the Northern Festival Centre, is named after the renowned actor Keith Michell, who grew up in Warnertown, 5 km (3 mi) from Port Pirie.

A play by actress and playwright Elena Carapetis, The Gods of Strangers, set in Port Pirie, is based on the oral histories of Greek, Cypriot and Italian people who migrated to regional South Australia after World War II. It was staged by the State Theatre Company South Australia in 2018. It played at the Dunstan Playhouse in Adelaide as well as in Port Pirie. It was also filmed by local production company KOJO and intended to be shown by Country Arts SA in regional cinemas in 2020, but it was later shown online owing to the COVID-19 pandemic in South Australia.

== News media ==
The town's main newspaper, The Recorder, was first published 21 March 1885 as The Port Pirie Advocate and Areas News. In 1971, a brief experiment, known as the Northern Observer (7 July - 30 August 1971), occurred when The Recorder and The Transcontinental from Port Augusta were published under a combined title in Port Pirie. The Recorder, which is still in print today (Tuesdays and Thursdays), has recently changed to a morning paper, after being delivered at around 3:00 pm. Other Port Pirie newspapers include the free The Flinders News (Wednesdays), and The Advertiser, which covers some Port Pirie news, but to a very small extent.

Another newspaper, the Port Pirie Advertiser (7 April 1898 – 28 June 1924) was also published by Robert Osborne. A further publication was the short-lived Saturday Times (6 December 1913 – 15 August 1914), printed by Roy Harold Butler and closed at the start of the Great War.

Television coverage in the city is provided by the ABC, SBS, GTS/BKN (7, 9 and 10) and Austar. Several radio stations cover Port Pirie, including ABC 639AM, ABC 891AM, 1044 5CS, 1242 5AU, ABC Classic FM, Radio National, ABC NewsRadio, triple j, Magic FM and Trax FM (a community radio station).

== Governance ==
=== State and federal ===
Port Pirie West state elections
	2006	2009
Labor	60.2%	36.6%
Liberal	28.8%	16.9%
Family First	5.7%	
SA Greens	3.4%	2.6%
Democrats	1.9%	
Geoff Brock		40.9%
Nationals SA		2.4%
One Nation		0.5%

Port Pirie West 2007 federal election
Labor	58.79%
Liberal	28.02%
Family First	5.18%
Greens	4.29%
National	1.46%
Democrats	1.38%
Independent	0.89%

The results shown are from "Port Pirie West", the largest polling booth in Port Pirie, which is at the SA TAFE Campus.

Port Pirie is part of the federal division of Grey, and has been represented by Liberal MP Tom Venning since 2025. Grey is held with a margin of 4.64% but is considered a safe Liberal seat.

The city is part of the state electoral district of Stuart, following the 2020 redistribution of electoral boundaries.

Although the region is generally Liberal-leaning because of its agricultural base, Port Pirie is an industrial centre that is favourable to the Australian Labor Party.

In late 2008, Rob Kerin announced his retirement, which led to a by-election being held in January 2009. Port Pirie mayor Geoff Brock announced his candidacy as an independent, and subsequently took the seat from the Liberals at the 2009 Frome by-election. After the poll for the by-election had closed and first preferences had been counted, (but before other preferences had been distributed), the result was LNP: 39.2%; ALP: 26.1%; Brock 23.6%; Nat: 6.6%; Greens: 3.8%; Other: 0.7%.

State Opposition Leader Martin Hamilton-Smith (Liberal Party) claimed victory, prematurely. Distribution of National Party, Greens and other preferences placed Brock ahead of the ALP candidate. Hence with the assistance of the ALP candidate's preferences, Geoff Brock won the by-election 51.7% to 48.3% for the Liberal candidate.

=== Local government ===
Port Pirie and some of the sparsely inhabited areas around it are in the Port Pirie Regional Council local government area.

== Notable residents ==
=== Sportspeople ===
- Brodie Atkinson (1972–), St. Kilda, Adelaide Crows, North Adelaide premiership player (1991), Sturt premiership player (2002) and Magarey Medal winner (1997)
- Mark Bickley (1969–), Adelaide Crows dual premiership captain
- Abby Bishop (1989–), Canberra Capitals basketball player
- Mark Jamar (1982–), Melbourne Demons player
- Lewis Johnston (1991–), Sydney Swans and Adelaide Crows football player
- Sam Mayes (1994–), North Adelaide, Brisbane Lions (2013–2018) and Port Adelaide FC (2019–) football player
- Nip Pellew (1893–1981), Australian test cricketer and North Adelaide player
- David Tiller (1958–), North Adelaide Roosters captain and premiership player
- Elijah Ware (1983–), Port Adelaide and Central Districts player and premiership player

=== Others ===
- Geoff Brock, state politician
- Sir Hugh Cairns (1896–1952), neurosurgeon
- Ted Connelly, state politician
- Lillian Crombie (1958–2024), actress
- Andrew Lacey (1887–1946), federal and state politician, state leader of the ALP 1933–1938
- Keith Michell (1928–2015), actor
- John Noble (1948–), actor and director
- Robert Stigwood (1934–2016), music entrepreneur and impresario
- Jørgen Jensen (1891–1922), Victoria Cross recipient

== See also ==
- Category:People from Port Pirie
- Diocese of Willochra
- Roman Catholic Diocese of Port Pirie
- Sir John Pirie, 1st Baronet, for whom several places and features are named
- Nyrstar
