= Halbury railway station =

Former railway station in South Australia, Australia

Halbury
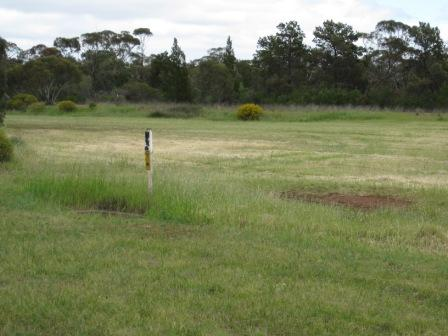
- The site of the former Halbury railway yard and station (September 2009)

General information
- Location: Balaklava Road, Halbury, South Australia
- Coordinates: 34.08579°S 138.51380°E
- Operator: Australian National
- Line: Hamley Bridge-Gladstone railway line
- Distance: 106 kilometres from Adelaide
- Platforms: 2
- Tracks: 2

Construction
- Structure type: Ground

Other information
- Status: Closed and demolished

History
- Opened: 1870
- Closed: 12 July 1981

Services
Preceding station	Australian National Railways Commission	Following station
Balaklava towards Adelaide	Gladstone railway line	Hoyleton towards Gladstone
Location

Halbury railway station was located on the Hamley Bridge-Gladstone railway line. It served the town of Halbury, South Australia.

== History ==
Halbury opened in 1870 on the isolated horse-drawn tramway built to deliver grain from the plains east of Port Wakefield in the areas of Balaklava, Halbury and Hoyle's Plains (now Hoyleton). The line from Hoyleton to Balaklava eventually became a part of the Hamley Bridge-Gladstone railway line when that line was extended to Gladstone on 2 July 1894. On 1 August 1927, the line gauge converted to 5 ft 3 in (1,600 mm). The station was named after the cadastral unit the town was in Hundred of Hall.

In 1978, the station and all associated infrastructure were included in the transfer of South Australian Railways to Australian National. Halbury closed to all goods and parcels traffic traffic on 12 July 1981 but remained open to pick up or set down passengers. The station closed to regular passengers on 6 November 1982. The line through Halbury closed on 29 March 1989 and the track was dismantled by 1992; there is no longer any trace of the station.

In 2012, a rail trail was developed from Balaklava to Halbury called the Shamus Liptrot cycling trail following the course of the old railway line. It was built in memory of a local elite cyclist Shamus Liptrot who died in 2011, several years after suffering injuries in a cycling accident.
