= Hoyleton railway station =

Station in South Australia, 1869 to 1982

Hoyleton
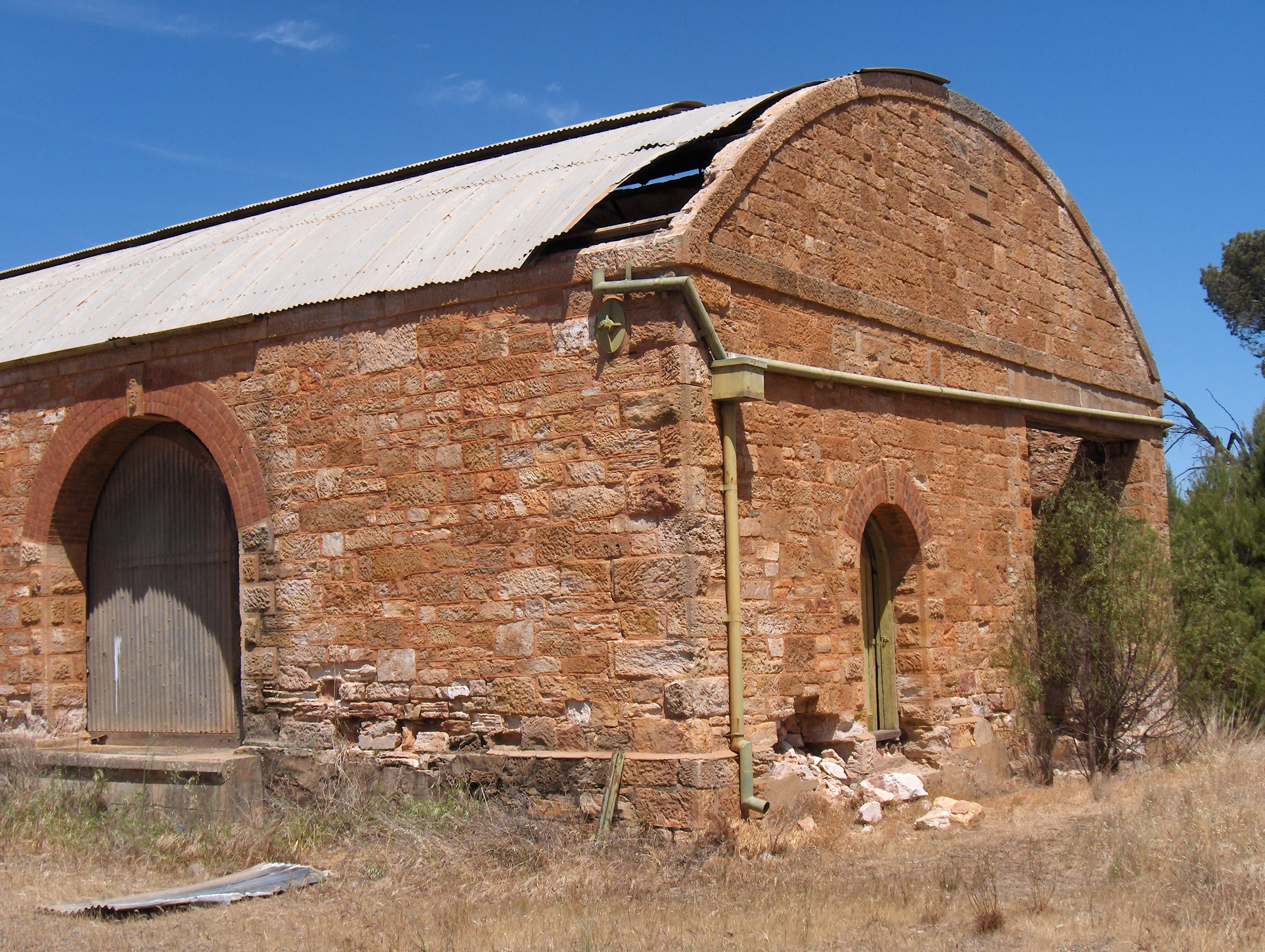
- The original goods shed (2006)

General information
- Location: Charles Terrace, Hoyleton, South Australia
- Coordinates: 34°01′31″S 138°33′38″E
- System: Former Australian National regional rail
- Owner: South Australian Railways 1869 - 1978 Australian National 1978 - 1989
- Operator: South Australian Railways 1869 - 1978 Australian National 1978 - 1986
- Line: Gladstone line
- Distance: 127 kilometres from Adelaide
- Platforms: 2
- Tracks: 2

Construction
- Structure type: Ground

Other information
- Status: Mostly demolished

History
- Opened: 1869
- Closed: 7 November 1982

Services
Preceding station	Australian National Railways Commission	Following station
Halbury towards Adelaide	Gladstone railway line	Kybunga towards Gladstone
Location

Hoyleton railway station was located on the Hamley Bridge-Gladstone railway line. It served the town of Hoyleton.

== History ==
=== Opening ===
Hoyleton railway station opened on 21 August 1869 when an isolated horse-drawn tramway was built to deliver grain from the plains east of Port Wakefield in the areas of Balaklava, Halbury and Hoyle's Plains (now Hoyleton) to that port. The line from Hoyleton to Balaklava eventually became a part of the Hamley Bridge-Gladstone railway line when that line was extended to Gladstone on 2 July 1894. The railway facilities at Hoyleton consisted of a ticket office, platforms for loading and unloading freight and passengers and a goods shed. The goods shed was constructed by S. Saunders from Port Wakefield, this solid building protected all goods required within a large area, and initially served the community as a meeting place, entertainment area, House of Worship and Sunday School.

=== Closure and demolition ===
In 1978, the station and all associated infrastructure were included in the transfer of South Australian Railways to Australian National. Hoyleton had become an unattended crossing station in July 1977. It closed to regular passengers on 6 November 1982 and closed to all parcels traffic on 7 November 1982. By January 1988, it was only listed as a crossing loop for trains. The line through Hoyleton closed to all traffic on 29 March 1989, and by 1992 all the tracks and infrastructure had been removed.

=== Present day ===
The original historic stone railway shed, and the goods platform remain standing alongside the grain silos which are still in use but are now serviced by road.
