= Yacka, South Australia =

Yacka South Australia
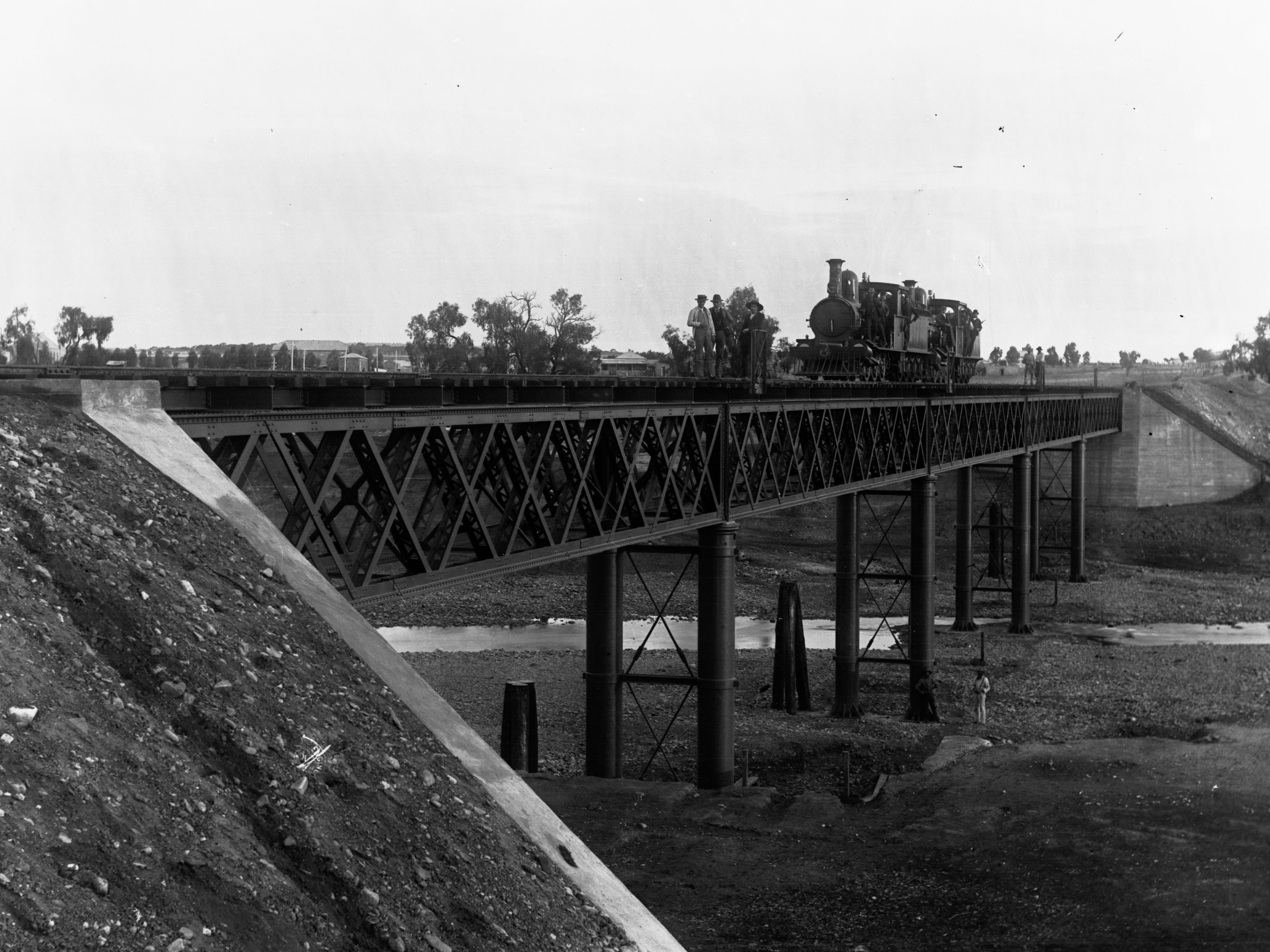
- Load test of the Yacka railway bridge, 1894

- Coordinates: 33.5708°S 138.4460°E
- Population: 147 (SAL 2021)
- Established: 1869
- Postcode(s): 5470
- Elevation: 163 m (535 ft)
- Location: 176 km (109 mi) North of Adelaide; 40 km (25 mi) NW of Clare
- LGA(s): Northern Areas Council
- State electorate(s): Electoral district of Frome
- Federal division(s): Division of Grey
Localities around Yacka:
Narridy	Gulnare	Spalding
Koolunga	Yacka	Broughton River Valley
Brinkworth	Brinkworth	Euromina; Marola

Yacka is a small town in the shallow valley of the Broughton River in the Mid North of South Australia. It lies where the Horrocks Highway (Main North Road) crosses the Broughton River midway between Clare and Gladstone.

The town name is a shortened form of 'Yackamoorundie' an indigenous place name for the area which was used to name Yackamoorundie Creek. The creek, which rises north of Caltowie, makes a significant bend from flowing southwards to flowing westwards near Gulnare about 11 kilometres (6.8 mi), as the crow flies, north-west of Yacka.

Yacka was a station on the Hamley Bridge-Gladstone railway line. It was originally built as narrow gauge in 1894. It was converted to broad gauge in 1927. Due to various reasons, this particular line had become obsolete and the tracks were removed by late 1989.

== See also ==
- Hundred of Yackamoorundie
