= Georgetown, South Australia =

Georgetown South Australia
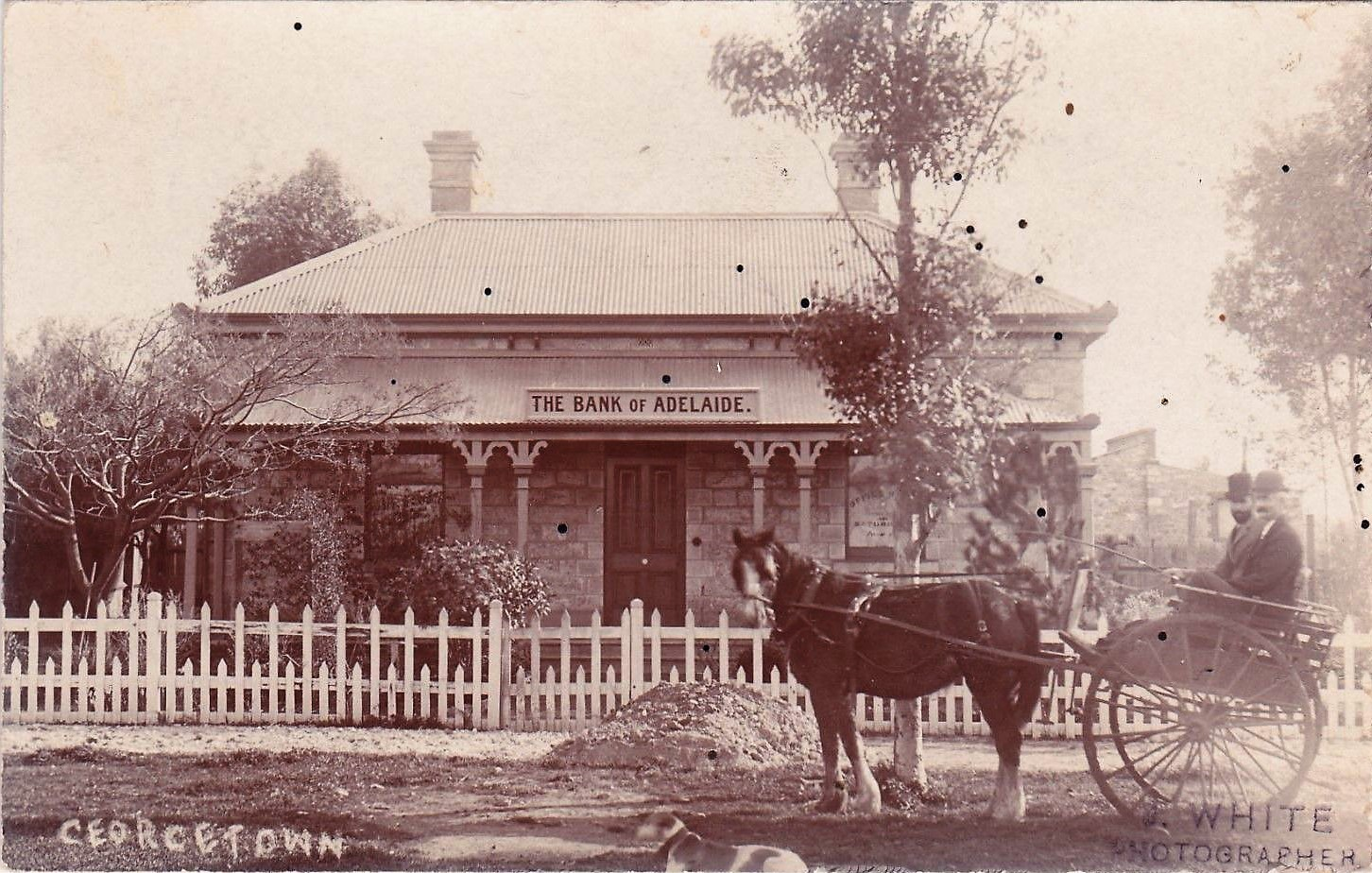
- Bank of Adelaide, Georgetown, early 1900s

- Coordinates: 33°22′0″S 138°24′0″E
- Population: 186 (SAL 2021)
- Postcode(s): 5472
- Location: 196 km (122 mi) N of Adelaide; 49 km (30 mi) SE of Port Pirie; 11 km (7 mi) S of Gladstone
- LGA(s): Northern Areas Council
- State electorate(s): Frome
- Federal division(s): Grey
Localities around Georgetown:
	Gladstone	West Bundaleer
Huddleston	Georgetown	Bundaleer Gardens, Washpool
Narridy	Gulnare	Spalding

Georgetown is a town in the Mid North region of South Australia. The town is in the Northern Areas Council, 196 kilometres (122 mi) north of the state capital, Adelaide on the Horrocks Highway (Main North Road).

Georgetown was one of the first towns to be surveyed in the upper Mid North when the Strangways Act was passed in 1869 to authorise resumption of pastoral leases to enable closer settlement for more intensive farming purposes. It was surveyed in 1869, along with Redhill. It was the seat of the District Council of Georgetown from 1876 to 1988, but following two successive amalgamations with neighbouring councils, it is now part of the Northern Areas Council.

A Catholic chapel was opened in 1872.

Georgetown was on the Gladstone railway line from Adelaide. This was constructed in 1894 as 3 ft 6 in (1,067 mm) narrow gauge. It was converted to 5 ft 3 in (1,600 mm) broad gauge in 1927 and closed in 1988.

== Geography and climate ==
Climate data for Georgetown
Month	Jan	Feb	Mar	Apr	May	Jun	Jul	Aug	Sep	Oct	Nov	Dec	Year
Record high °C (°F)	44.4 (111.9)	41.7 (107.1)	40.6 (105.1)	34.7 (94.5)	27.3 (81.1)	26.0 (78.8)	26.4 (79.5)	25.2 (77.4)	33.2 (91.8)	36.7 (98.1)	42.2 (108.0)	43.4 (110.1)	44.4 (111.9)
Mean daily maximum °C (°F)	31.1 (88.0)	30.7 (87.3)	28.1 (82.6)	22.9 (73.2)	18.2 (64.8)	15.0 (59.0)	14.2 (57.6)	15.5 (59.9)	18.7 (65.7)	22.4 (72.3)	26.2 (79.2)	29.2 (84.6)	22.7 (72.9)
Mean daily minimum °C (°F)	15.0 (59.0)	15.2 (59.4)	13.1 (55.6)	9.8 (49.6)	7.1 (44.8)	5.1 (41.2)	4.2 (39.6)	4.5 (40.1)	5.7 (42.3)	7.8 (46.0)	10.6 (51.1)	13.1 (55.6)	9.3 (48.7)
Record low °C (°F)	4.0 (39.2)	6.7 (44.1)	2.8 (37.0)	0.0 (32.0)	−0.4 (31.3)	−3.6 (25.5)	−6.6 (20.1)	−2.3 (27.9)	−2.9 (26.8)	−0.4 (31.3)	0.6 (33.1)	2.2 (36.0)	−6.6 (20.1)
Average rainfall mm (inches)	20.4 (0.80)	20.8 (0.82)	20.4 (0.80)	35.5 (1.40)	50.5 (1.99)	58.4 (2.30)	57.0 (2.24)	56.7 (2.23)	52.7 (2.07)	44.7 (1.76)	31.6 (1.24)	26.0 (1.02)	474.7 (18.67)
Average rainy days (≥ 0.2mm)	3.1	2.9	3.6	6.1	9.2	11.3	12.4	12.3	10.0	7.9	5.5	4.4	88.7
Source: Bureau of Meteorology
