= Laura railway station =

Former railway station in South Australia, Australia

Laura

General information
- Operator: South Australian Railways
- Line: Wilmington line
- Platforms: 1
- Tracks: 1

Construction
- Structure type: Ground

Other information
- Status: Demolished

History
- Opened: 2 June 1884
- Closed: 1969

Services
Preceding station	Australian National Railways Commission	Following station
Gladstone Terminus	Wilmington railway line	Stone Hut towards Wilmington

Laura railway station was located on the Wilmington railway line. It served the town of Laura, South Australia.

== History ==
Laura railway station opened on 2 June 1884 as the short lived terminus of the Wilmington line. The line was later extended to Booleroo Centre on 13 April 1910, and to Wilmington on 20 July 1915. Laura railway station consisted of four rooms for the use of the station aster, a large booking office, a ladies'waiting-room, and accommodation for the porters. A railway yard was later added consisting of a goods shed, turntables and other necessary accommodations.

With the conversion of the Port Pirie to Broken Hill line from narrow to standard gauge in 1969, the line became an isolated narrow gauge railway leading to the cessation of passenger services. The line closed completely on 13 March 1990; there is no longer any trace of the station.
