= Hornsdale, South Australia =

Hornsdale South Australia
- Coordinates: 33.0681°S 138.5217°E
- Population: 36 (SAL 2021)
- Postcode(s): 5491
- LGA(s): Northern Areas Council
- State electorate(s): Stuart
- Federal division(s): Grey
Localities around Hornsdale:
Booleroo Centre	Tarcowie	Yatina
Appila	Hornsdale	Mannanarie
Caltowie West	Caltowie North	Jamestown

Hornsdale is a locality in the Mid North region of South Australia 226 kilometres (140 mi) north of Adelaide.

Mount Lock, Mount Ngaduri, Mount Williams and Champion Hill within the Narien Range form the eastern boundary of Hornsdale locality from south to north.

In October 1880, local landowner William Horne established the post office on section 195B, named Tarcowie East. It was renamed Hornsdale in 1882.

The locality is now home to the 99-turbine Hornsdale Wind Farm operated by Neoen, and the Hornsdale Energy Reserve operated by Tesla, which is known as the world's largest lithium-ion battery.
