= Koolunga, South Australia =

Koolunga South Australia
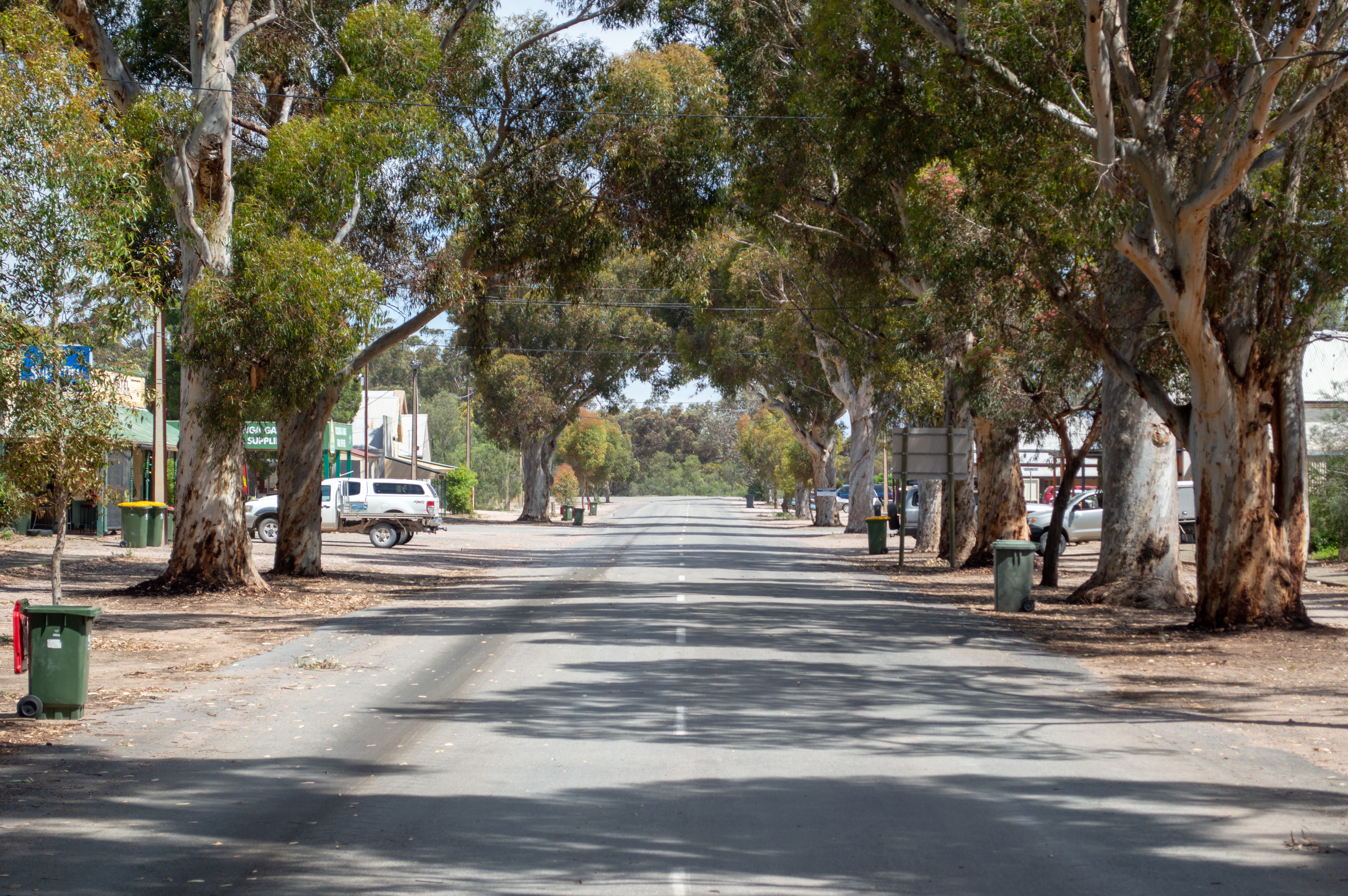
- Sixth Street, Koolunga

- Coordinates: 33°32′0″S 138°13′0″E
- Population: 195 (2016 census)
- Postcode(s): 5464
- Location: 64 km (40 mi) SE of Port Pirie; 33 km (21 mi) south of Crystal Brook; 46 km (29 mi) NW of Clare
- LGA(s): Port Pirie Regional Council
- Region: Mid North
- State electorate(s): Frome
- Federal division(s): Grey
Localities around Koolunga:
Crystal Brook	Narridy	Gulnare
Redhill	Koolunga	Yacka
Collinsfield, Lake View		Brinkworth

Koolunga (postcode 5464) is a town in the Mid North of South Australia. According to the 2016 Australian Census, the population of the town and surrounding area is approximately 200.

== History ==
On 5 March 1846, John Hope applied for a land occupation licence covering what is now the township. Koolunga township was established in the 1880s beside the Broughton River near the ford known as "Hope's Crossing". The town was surveyed for the government by W.G. Evans on 30 August 1875 and the first lots of land went on sale on 7 October 1875. Koolunga is believed to be a Ngadjuri (Aboriginal) word meaning "red banks", with reference to the banks of the Broughton River east of Hope's Crossing.

By the early twentieth century, Koolunga had a general store, a hotel, post office, butcher shop, town hall, church, and a garage. However, by the end of the century, the general store, post office, and butcher shop had closed and been turned into residential properties.

There was a railway station named Koolunga on the Gladstone railway line, later renamed to Boucaut station, but this was 11 kilometres (6.8 mi) southeast of the town and the railway did not pass through the town of Koolunga.

== Economy ==
The main economic activities of the town and surrounding area are cereal and canola cropping, with sheep husbandry to a lesser extent.

== Services ==
Much like the other small towns in the area, Koolunga provides the bare essential services for its residents and the agriculture industry. Residents will typically travel to the larger towns of Port Pirie, Crystal Brook, or Clare for shopping and public services. There is a small primary school and bowling green on the edges of town.

Bunyip Park is situated on the south-east side of Koolunga with a gate leading to the Bunyip River Trail. This short circular trail follows both sides of the Broughton River. Bunyip Park has basic barbecue facilities and can be used as a camp site. A large creature from Aboriginal mythology known as the bunyip was believed to have been sighted at a nearby waterhole in 1883, giving rise to the name.

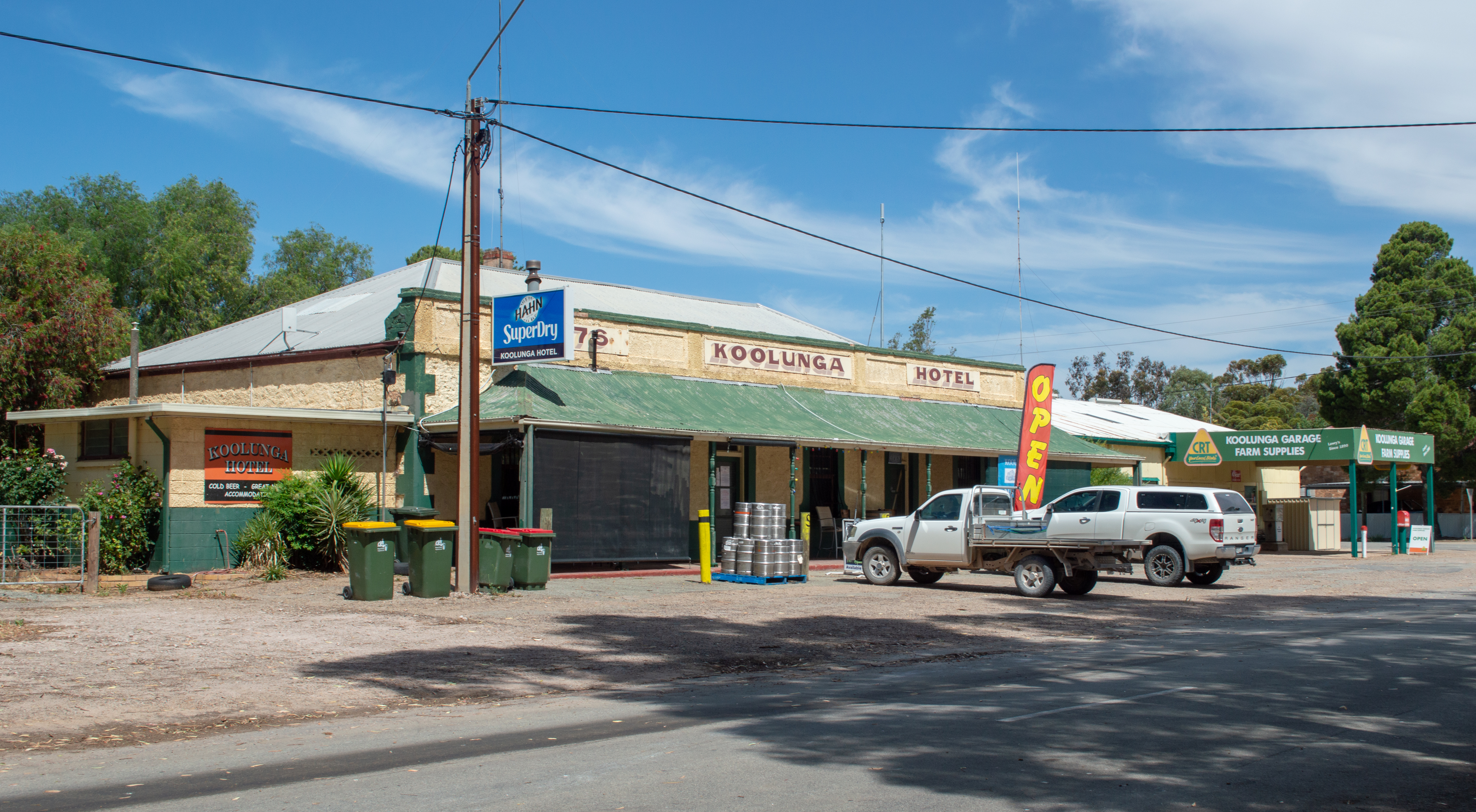
The Koolunga Hotel was established in 1876

== Governance ==
Koolunga is in the Port Pirie Regional Council local government area, the South Australian House of Assembly electoral district of Frome and the Australian House of Representatives Division of Grey.
