= Mannanarie, South Australia =

Coordinates: 33°03′S 138°37′E

Mannanarie South Australia
- Population: 52 (SAL 2021)
- Postcode(s): 5422
- LGA(s): Northern Areas Council
- State electorate(s): Stuart
- Federal division(s): Grey
Localities around Mannanarie:
Tarcowie	Yatina	Sunnybrae
Hornsdale	Mannanarie	Sunnybrae; Yongala
Jamestown	Jamestown	Belalie North
- Footnotes: Coordinates

Mannanarie is a rural locality in the Mid North region of South Australia, situated in the Northern Areas Council. It was established in April 2001, when boundaries were formalised for the "long established local name". It comprises most of the cadastral Hundred of Mannanarie, apart from a northern section which lies in Tarcowie and Yatina. The name stems from an Aboriginal word, "manangari", meaning "good string or cord", stemming from a local native plant useful for string making.

The area was originally the territory of the Ngadjuri people. It was taken up as a pastoral run (the Mannanarie Run) by European settlers in the 1850s, until it was subdivided when opened for selection in 1871. The Hundred of Mannanarie was gazetted on 20 July 1871. In 1872, the township site was described as being "innocent of houses", with one commentator stating "naturally at present the work of settlement is very incomplete and unfinished" although "signs of agricultural activity are multiplying all over the place". The dwellings at that stage were "for the most part only temporary, consisting of a few sheets of iron, a tarpaulin, a deserted hut, or some similar simple shelter". In the 1870s, much of the district focused on wheat production, shifting away from previous attempts at grazing.

A post office opened at Mannanarie in March 1874, and a Primitive Methodist church opened later the same year, with a store and private school also opening by 1875. A township was surveyed as a private subdivision in 1877. The Mannanarie Hotel was granted a license in 1879. An Anglican church and a new Primitive Methodist church were built in 1880, and a blacksmith, more stores and a school in 1882, and a racing club in 1891. The Anglican church closed in 1896 and was demolished, but the Mannanarie Institute (later Mannanarie Public Hall) was built on the site in 1912. The hotel's license was not renewed in 1917. In 1918, the township consisted of a "hall, school, post-office, three residences, store [and] blacksmith". It was severely affected by the Black Sunday bushfires in 1955. Regular Methodist services ceased at Mannanarie in 1966, with the church disposing of the building in 1983. The school closed in 1970. The 1970 realignment of the Crystal Brook-Broken Hill railway line saw the new line routed through Mannanarie.

In 2012, Mannanarie was described as "one of those tiny old towns where there's little more left than an ageing hall, an empty stone church, a long closed school and a couple of houses." The Mannanarie Public Hall was renovated for its centenary in that year, having become "increasingly decrepit" in past decades.

It was part of the District Council of Yongala from 1888 to 1935, the District Council of Jamestown from 1935 to 1997, and has been part of the Northern Areas Council since 1997.

== See also ==
- Mannanarie Hills
