= Northern Areas Council =

- Local government area
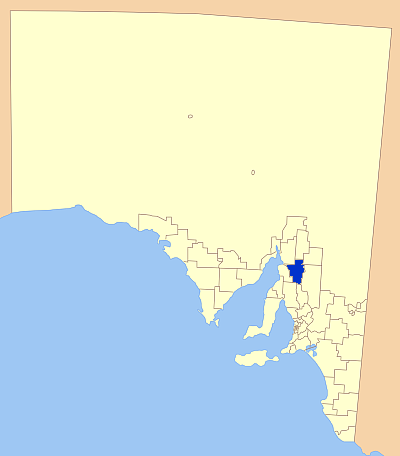
- Location of the Northern Areas Council

- Interactive map of Northern Areas Council
- Coordinates: 33°12′14″S 138°36′20″E
- Country: Australia
- State: South Australia
- Region: Yorke and Mid North
- Established: 1997
- Council seat: Jamestown

Government
  - Mayor: Keith Pluckrose
  - State electorate: Frome, Stuart
  - Federal division: Grey

Area
  - Total: 3,070 km^{2} (1,190 sq mi)

Population
  - Total: 4,559 (LGA 2021)
- Website: Northern Areas Council
LGAs around Northern Areas Council
Mount Remarkable	Orroroo Carrieton	Peterborough
Port Pirie	Northern Areas Council	Goyder
Wakefield	Clare and Gilbert Valleys	Goyder

Northern Areas Council is a local government area in the Yorke and Mid North region of South Australia. The council seat and main council offices are at Jamestown, while the council also maintains district offices at Gladstone and Spalding.

== History ==
Most of the region was first settled in the early 1840s, only a few years after the settlement of Adelaide. Several explorers had passed through the area on their way to more remote places, including Edward John Eyre and John Horrocks.

The Northern Areas Council came into effect on 3 May 1997, when the District Council of Rocky River, the District Council of Spalding and the District Council of Jamestown merged. Rocky River and Jamestown had themselves previously been subject to a number of amalgamations, and had a large number of predecessor municipalities; in contrast, the Spalding council had a much different history, as prior to the merger, it had been an independent municipality predating the landmark District Councils Act 1887.

== Localities ==
The district encompasses a number of towns and localities, including Andrews, Beetaloo Valley, Belalie East, Belalie North, Broughton River Valley, Bundaleer Gardens, Bundaleer North, Caltowie, Caltowie North, Caltowie West, Euromina, Georgetown, Gladstone, Gulnare, Hacklins Corner, Hornsdale, Jamestown, Laura, Mannanarie, Mayfield, Narridy, Spalding, Washpool, West Bundaleer and Yacka, and part of Appila, Canowie Belt, Huddleston, Stone Hut, Tarcowie and Yatina.

== Council ==
Ward	Councillor	Notes
Belalie	Fiona Hockey	
Belalie	Hank Langes	
Belalie	Glan Moore	
Belalie	Tom Malone	Deputy Mayor
Rocky River	Denise Higgins	
Rocky River	Sue Scarman	
Rocky River	John Barberien	
Broughton	Keith Pluckrose	Mayor
Yackamoorundie	Ian Pomerenke	

== See also ==
- List of parks and gardens in rural South Australia
