= Gulnare, South Australia =

Gulnare South Australia
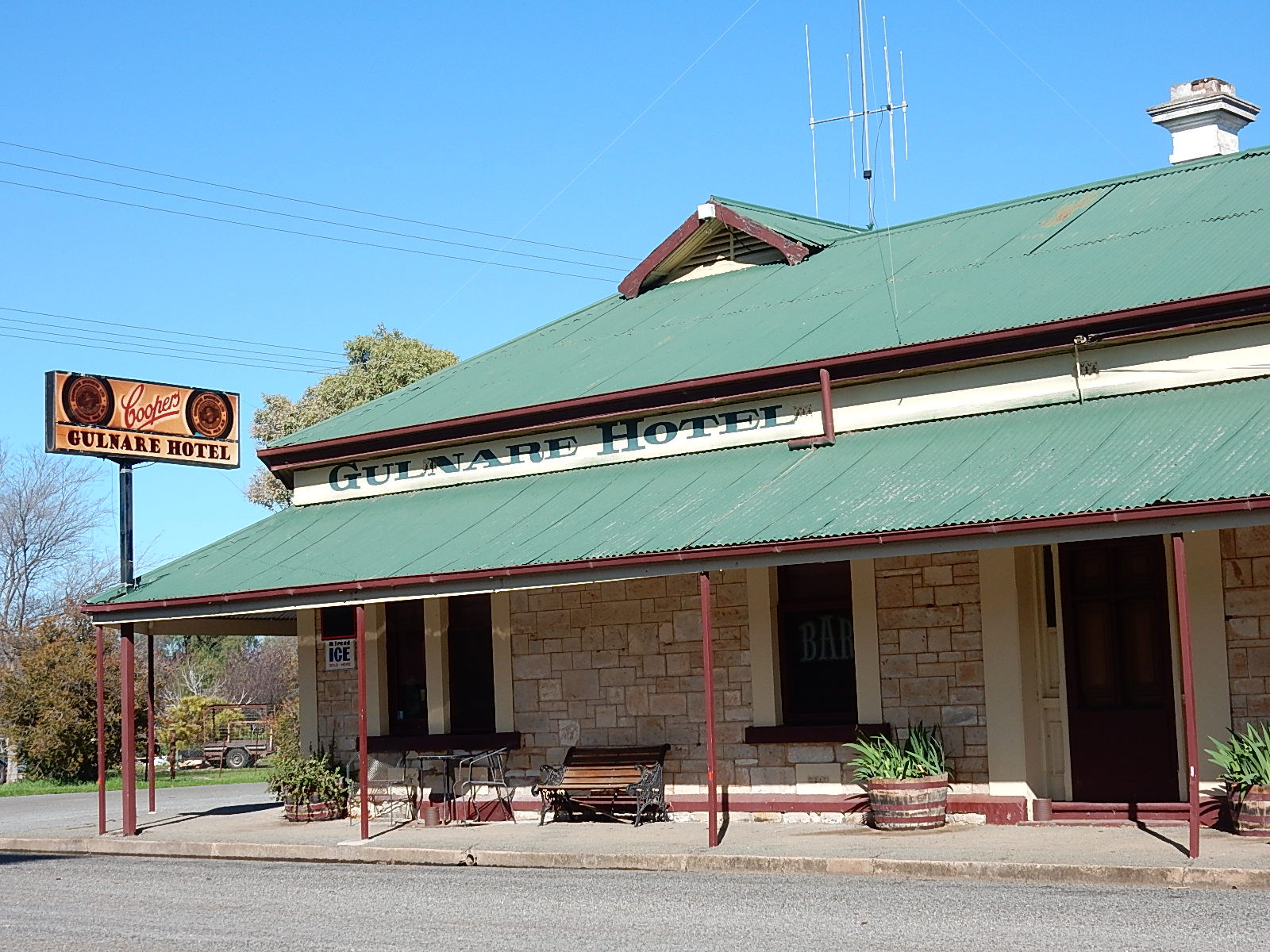

- Coordinates: 33.4673°S 138.4422°E
- Population: 80 (SAL 2021)
- Postcode(s): 5471
- Elevation: 283 m (928 ft)
- Location: 188 km (117 mi) north of Adelaide; 24 km (15 mi) south of Gladstone; 57 km (35 mi) SE of Port Pirie
- LGA(s): Northern Areas Council
- State electorate(s): Frome
- Federal division(s): Grey
Localities around Gulnare:
	Georgetown	Washpool
Narridy	Gulnare	Spalding
Koolunga	Yacka	Broughton River Valley

Gulnare is a settlement in South Australia. At the 2006 census, Gulnare had a population of 95. It is where the east–west Goyder Highway crosses the former Hamley Bridge-Gladstone railway line, and about a kilometre east of the south–north Horrocks Highway, 188 kilometres (117 mi) north of Adelaide. The railway was built as a narrow gauge in 1894 and converted to broad gauge in 1927. The railway had been closed by 1993.

The town of Gulnare was named for the Gulnare Plain. The plain was named by either John Horrocks or William Light. The name of Gulnare in Byron's Turkish Tales and the name of Colonel Light's ship Gulnare are both derived from an English spelling of Julnar the Sea-born in older English translations of the Arabian Nights.
