= Tarcowie, South Australia =

Tarcowie South Australia
- Coordinates: 32°57′S 138°31′E
- Population: 41 (SAL 2021)
- Postcode(s): 5431
- Elevation: 574 m (1,883 ft)
- Time zone: ACST (UTC+9:30)
  - Summer (DST): ACDT (UTC+10:30)
- LGA(s): Northern Areas Council; District Council of Orroroo Carrieton
- County: Dalhousie
- State electorate(s): Stuart
- Federal division(s): Grey
Localities around Tarcowie:
| Booleroo Centre | Pekina | Black Rock |
| | Tarcowie | Yatina |
| Appila | Hornsdale | Mannanarie |

Tarcowie (postcode 5431) is a town in South Australia. Tarcowie is an aboriginal word meaning "torrential waters". It was named by Governor Musgrave on 20 May 1875.

The dominant industry in Tarcowie is sheep farming, however in recent times wind farming may be taking over as the main industry for the town. The Tarcowie Landcare Group, an environmental organisation, is based in this town.

The Tarcowie township and southern half of the locality is in the Northern Areas Council. The northern part of the locality is in the District Council of Orroroo Carrieton. The historic former Stagg Farm Complex, located on the Tarcowie to Appila Road, is listed on the South Australian Heritage Register.

== See also ==
- Tarcowie Hills
