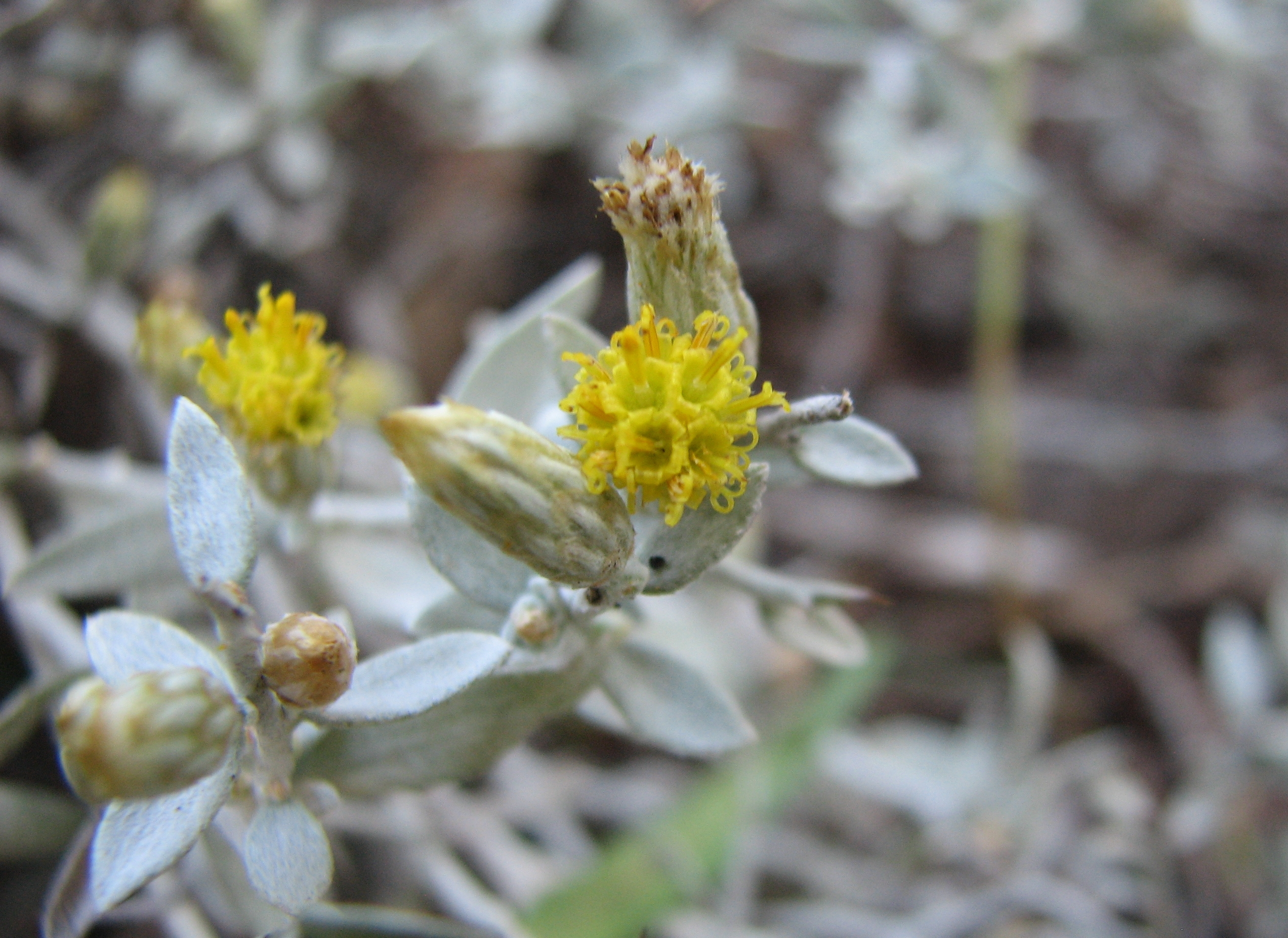
- Acanthocladium_dockeri

Conservation status
- Critically endangered (EPBC Act)

Scientific classification
- Kingdom: Plantae
- Clade: Tracheophytes
- Clade: Angiosperms
- Clade: Eudicots
- Clade: Asterids
- Order: Asterales
- Family: Asteraceae
- Subfamily: Asteroideae
- Tribe: Gnaphalieae
- Genus: Acanthocladium; F.Muell. 1861 not Mitt. 1883 (Sematophyllaceae, a moss)
- Species: A. dockeri

Binomial name
- Acanthocladium dockeri F.Muell.

Synonyms
- Helichrysum dockeri (F.Muell.) Benth.

= Acanthocladium =

Species of plant

Acanthocladium dockeri is a critically endangered species of the family Asteraceae that belongs to the monotypic genus Acanthocladium. It is commonly known as spiny everlasting or spiny daisy. It is native to Australia, and is found around the South Australian town of Laura.

== Description ==
The spiny everlasting is a woody perennial shrub with spines at branch ends, covered in short white hair. It bears oblong, bumpy fruit.

Spiny everlasting was presumed extinct in 1992, having suffered habitat loss from clearance for winter crops, but various colonies of it have been found around Laura, near the Spencer Gulf.

== Homonym ==
In 1883, William Mitten used the same name, Acanthocladium, to refer to a group of mosses, now in the family Sematophyllaceae. Several dozen species of mosses were described and place in this genus before it was realized that Mittenn's name represented an illegitimate homonym. The moss genus has since been renamed Wijkia H.A. Crum.

== Bibliography ==
- Bentham, George; Mueller, Ferdinand Jacob Heinrich von (1867). Flora australiensis: a description of the plants of the Australian territory. Vol. 3. London: L. Reeve and co.
- Mueller, Ferdinand Jacob Heinrich von (1861). Fragmenta phytographiæ Australiæ (in Latin). Vol. 2. Melbourne: Auctoritate Gubern. Coloniæ Victoriæ, Ex Officina Joannis Ferres.
