= Canowie =

Canowie may refer to

- Canowie Station pastoral lease
- Canowie, South Australia locality south of what remains of the pastoral lease
