= Hornsdale Wind Farm =

Wind farm in South Australia

- Country: Australia
- Location: South Australia
- Coordinates: 33.058°S 138.544°E
- Status: Operational
- Construction cost: A$89 million
- Owner: Neoen Australia
- Operator: Neoen

Nuclear power station
- Reactor supplier: Siemens

Wind farm
- Type: Onshore
- Hub height: 92.5 metres (303 ft)
- Rotor diameter: 110 metres (360 ft)

Power generation
- Units operational: 99
- Nameplate capacity: 315 MW

External links
- Website: Official website

The Hornsdale Wind Farm is an electricity generator in the locality of Hornsdale in the south-west of the Narien Range, north of Jamestown, South Australia. It consists of 99 wind turbines with a generation capacity of 315 megawatts (422,000 hp). The plant is owned and operated by Neoen, a French renewable energy company.

The electricity generated by Hornsdale Wind Farm is contracted to be supplied to the Australian Capital Territory.

== Construction ==
The "Balance of Plant" civil engineering and site works for the wind farm was performed by Catcon for all three stages of construction. The wind turbine generators were imported from Denmark, and the towers from Vietnam. They were commissioned by Siemens Australia. Before the whole wind farm was commissioned, Hornsdale was generating 86 MW immediately prior to the 2016 South Australian blackout in September 2016.

== Operation ==
The wind farm supplies 1 TWh/year to the 275 kV grid from 3.2 MW direct-drive turbines (no gearbox). The 100 MW Phase 2 tested supplying 6 out of 8 grid services between August 2017 and February 2018.

== Artwork ==
Two of the towers feature paintings by people from the indigenous peoples of the region. Jessica Turner is a Nukunu woman whose artwork represents the story of the serpent's role in forming aspects of the landscape, particularly waterholes. Chris Angrave and Louise Brown are Ngadjuri people who depicted how the Mungiura were found in hilly country, peering over the top of windbreaks before a storm, and blowing hard, which caused a whirly wind.

== Hornsdale Power Reserve ==
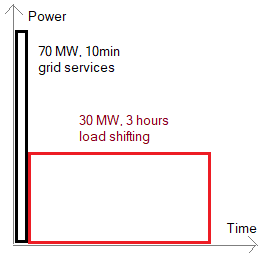
Diagram of power and duration of the two sections of battery

The Hornsdale Power Reserve is a grid-connected battery complex co-located with the Hornsdale Wind Farm. It was built by Tesla, Inc. for about US$50 million.

It is owned and operated by Neoen, with the government having the right to call on the stored power under certain circumstances. It provides a total of 129 megawatt-hours (460 GJ) of storage capable of discharge at 100 megawatts (130,000 hp) into the power grid. It provides several services to the grid:

- 70 MW running for 10 minutes (11.7 MWh) is contracted to the government to provide stability to the grid (grid services) and prevent load-shedding blackouts while other generators are started in the event of sudden drops in wind or other network issues. This service has reduced the cost of grid services to the Australian Energy Market Operator by 90%.
- 30 MW for 3 hours (90 MWh) is used by Neoen for load management to store energy when prices are low and sell it when demand is high.

The battery construction was completed and testing began on 25 November 2017. It was connected to the grid on 1 December 2017. This easily beat Elon Musk's wager of "100 days from contract signature", which started when a grid connection agreement was signed with ElectraNet on 29 September 2017. Tesla had already begun construction, and some units were already operational by the time the contract was signed. Due to the project's success and the area's demand for stable electricity output, the project was expanded by 50% in November 2019. The upgraded system is capable of discharge at 150 megawatts (200,000 hp) into the power grid.
