= District Council of Narridy =

Former local government area of South Australia

Coordinates: 33°26′S 138°18′E

The District Council of Narridy was a local government area in South Australia, centred on the town of Narridy and the surrounding cadastral hundred of the same name. It was proclaimed on 2 March 1876 with responsibility for the Hundred of Narridy, and divided into five wards (North-West, North-East, Centre, South-West and South-East), each electing one councillor. A council chamber had been completed by the end of December 1879; it was described as "not a large building" but "well suited for the purposes for which it was intended". The Narridy council ceased to exist from 5 January 1888 after being amalgamated with the adjacent District Council of Georgetown by the District Councils Act 1887. Its abolition was followed by angry local calls for a demerger later in 1888, which met with blanket government refusal; at a local meeting discussing this outcome, it was reported that "it was freely expressed that the Premier was working into the hands of Georgetown".

== Chairmen of the District Council of Narridy ==
- J. Porter (1877-1879)
- W. Brock (1879-1881)
- J. Porter (1881-1883)
