= Yatina =

Yatina South Australia
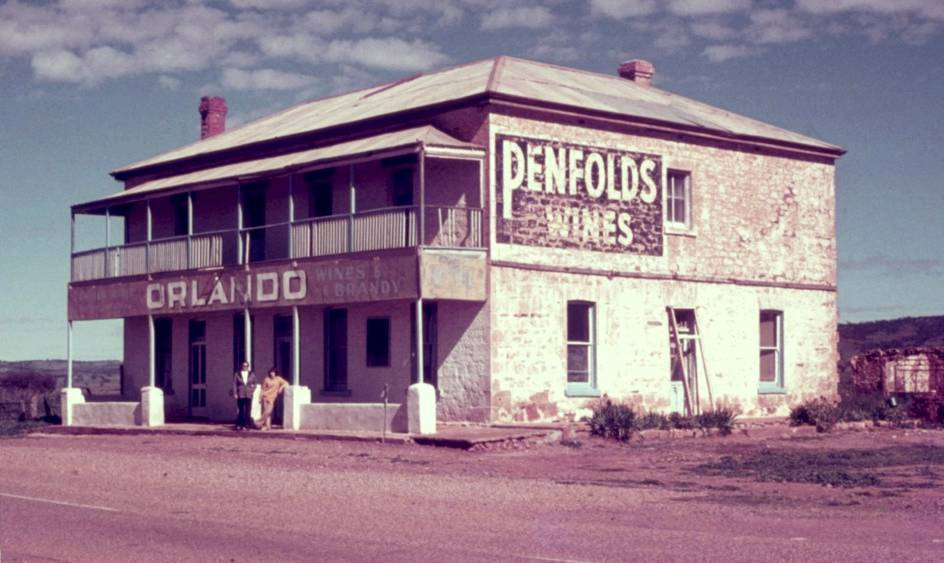
- Yatina Hotel in 1974

- Coordinates: 32°55′52″S 138°39′57″E
- Population: 32 (SAL 2021)
- Established: 16 July 1874 (town); 16 December 1999 (locality)
- Postcode(s): 5422
- Time zone: ACST (UTC+9:30)
  - Summer (DST): ACST (UTC+10:30)
- Location: 222 km (138 mi) N of Adelaide; 21 km (13 mi) S of Orroroo; 31 km (19 mi) N of Jamestown
- LGA(s): Orroroo Carrieton; Northern Areas Council
- Region: Yorke and Mid North
- County: Dalhousie
- State electorate(s): Stuart
- Federal division(s): Grey
| Mean max temp | Mean min temp | Annual rainfall |
| 21.9 °C; 71 °F | 7.3 °C; 45 °F | 365.7 mm 14.4 in |
Localities around Yatina:
| Black Rock; Tarcowie | Black Rock | Minvalara |
| Tarcowie | Yatina | Minvalara; Sunnybrae |
| Mannanarie | Mannanarie | Sunnybrae |
- Footnotes: LGA; Adjoining localities

Yatina is a town and locality in the Australian state of South Australia located on the RM Williams Way about 222 kilometres (138 mi) north of the state capital of Adelaide and about 31 kilometres (19 mi) and 21 kilometres (13 mi) respectively from the municipal seats of Jamestown and Orroroo.

== History ==
The name of the town derives from the Aboriginal name of a nearby black rock. Yatina was proclaimed as a town in July 1874, and the first town lots were sold in September that year. The Yatina Hotel was also built that same year.

St Virgilius Church and Primitive Methodist Chapel were opened in November and December 1876 respectively.

Early hopes for the new town were disappointed in 1877 when a promised railway extension bypassed the town.

The school opened in 1879 and closed in 1952.

In 1886, Yatina's population was 80, with an estimate of 100 residents the next year.

Boundaries for the locality were created on 16 December 1999 that include the site of the Government Town of Yatina. The portion within the Northern Areas Council, being the southern side of locality, was added on 12 April 2001. Part of Yatina on its western side was 'excluded' and added to the adjoining locality of Tarcowie on 2 August 2012 following a request from residents.

== Governance ==
Yatina is located within the federal division of Grey, the state electoral district of Stuart, and the local government areas of the District Council of Orroroo Carrieton and the Northern Areas Council.

== Land use ==
As of 2012, land use within the locality is "primary production" and is concerned with "agricultural production and the grazing of stock on relatively large holdings".

== Media ==
Yatina, and the Yatina Hotel specifically, was used as a primary location for the feature film The Royal Hotel, filmed in 2022 and released in 2023.
