= Golden North =

Australian ice cream company

- Industry: Ice Cream
- Founded: 1923; 103 years ago
- Headquarters: Laura, South Australia, Australia
- Website: goldennorth.com.au/about-us/golden-north-history/

Golden North is an Australian ice cream maker headquartered in Laura, South Australia, and has been in business since 1923.

== History ==
Starting as a dairy farm operated by the Bowker family, the business took on ice-making to keep its scalded milk fresh in the hot climate as it expanded its sales territory to Broken Hill in New South Wales. The Golden North brand was adopted in 1948. The business was acquired by Farmers Union in 1972, then in 1991, it became a subsidiary of National Foods. In 2001, a group of South Australian investors brought the business back under local private ownership. In 2006, they expanded their plant. Their flavours include a distinctive honey ice cream. Besides manufacturing ice cream under the Golden North brand, they make generic brand ice cream for sale in supermarkets.

In July 2025 management announced the imminent move of the factory to the old Beston "Edward's Crossing" cheese works at Murray Bridge, citing loss of milk suppliers in the Mid North and increased business opportunities.

== Zoos SA Contractual Disputes ==
In 2014 Zoos SA announced that it would be prematurely ending its contract with Golden North in favour of the "[financially] beneficial" products from Streets. This followed Golden North's efforts (encouraged by Zoos SA) to remove palm oil from their products, while Streets still contained palm oil in their products. This decision led to public outrage, initially defended by Zoos SA on financial grounds then back-tracked after "very strong" community feedback, announcing that both brands would be made available at its Adelaide and Monarto sites while it negotiated changes to the Streets contract.

Similarly in March 2022 a separate dispute arose when Adelaide Zoo awarded its ice-cream supply contract to Peters. Golden North expressed disappointment after its longstanding supply and relationship for Zoos SA. Zoos SA stated the tender assessed bidders on a range of criteria including environmental credentials, and defended its position by noting its policy of supporting sustainably produced palm oil.

== See also ==
- List of South Australian manufacturing businesses
- South Australian food and drink
