= Mayfield, South Australia =

Mayfield South Australia
- Coordinates: 33.35°S 138.65°E
- Population: 4 (SAL 2016)
- Postcode(s): 5454
- LGA(s): Northern Areas Council
- State electorate(s): Stuart
- Federal division(s): Grey
Localities around Mayfield:
Bundaleer North	Belalie East	Belalie East
Washpool	Mayfield	Canowie
Washpool	Hacklins Corner	Canowie

Mayfield is a rural locality in the Mid North region of South Australia. It is situated in the Northern Areas Council.

The name and boundaries were formally established in April 2001, with the name having been proposed by the council. There is some ambiguity about the origin of the name: the state place name gazetteer records it as being "possibly [named] after the local road"; however, there is no current road by that name in Mayfield, but there is a Mayfield Homestead.

It occupies roughly the north-eastern quarter of the cadastral Hundred of Reynolds.

The locality is entirely rural in nature, and a series of rough dirt roads are the only means of vehicle access through the area.

The historic Coolootoo Shepherd's Hut, a remnant of the significant Old Canowie Station, is located on the boundary between Mayfield and its northern neighbour Belalie East, and is listed on the South Australian Heritage Register.
