= Belalie East, South Australia =

Belalie East South Australia
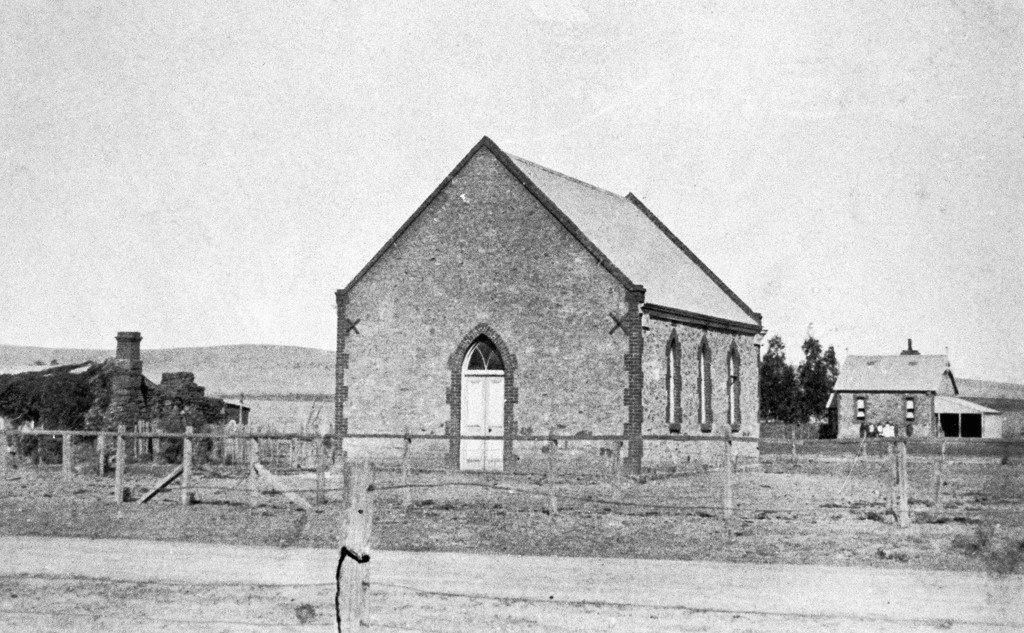
- Former Presbyterian Church in 1910

- Coordinates: 33°16′16″S 138°39′13″E
- Population: 62 (SAL 2021)
- Established: 12 April 2001
- Postcode(s): 5491
- Time zone: ACST (UTC+9:30)
  - Summer (DST): ACST (UTC+10:30)
- Location: 184 km (114 mi) N of Adelaide
- LGA(s): Northern Areas Council
- Region: Yorke and Mid North
- County: Victoria
- State electorate(s): Stuart
- Federal division(s): Grey
Mean max temp	Mean min temp	Annual rainfall
22.7 °C; 73 °F	9.3 °C; 49 °F	474.1 mm 18.7 in
Localities around Belalie East:
Jamestown	Belalie North	Canowie Belt
Bundaleer North	Belalie East	Whyte Yarcowie
Washpool	Mayfield; Canowie	Hallett
- Footnotes: Adjoining localities

Belalie East is a rural locality in the Mid North region of South Australia. It is situated in the Northern Areas Council. The boundaries were formally established in April 2001 for the long established local name, relating to the cadastral Hundred of Belalie; however, the modern locality is divided between Belalie and the adjacent Hundred of Whyte.

The Wilkins Highway runs roughly diagonally through the centre of Belalie East, connecting Jamestown and Hallett.

The Belalie East school opened in 1878 and closed in 1959. The Belalie East Memorial Hall opened on 1 September 1923, and survives today. A Presbyterian church was built in 1881; its date of closure is unknown. It also formerly had its own coursing club. Belalie East has had three post offices: the first operated between 11 June 1873 and 2 May 1876, the second operated between 1 November 1883 and 31 March 1892 and the third operated between approximately 1896 and 1898.

The historic Coolootoo Shepherd's Hut, a remnant of the significant Old Canowie Station, is located on the boundary between Belalie East and its southern neighbour Mayfield, and is listed on the South Australian Heritage Register.
