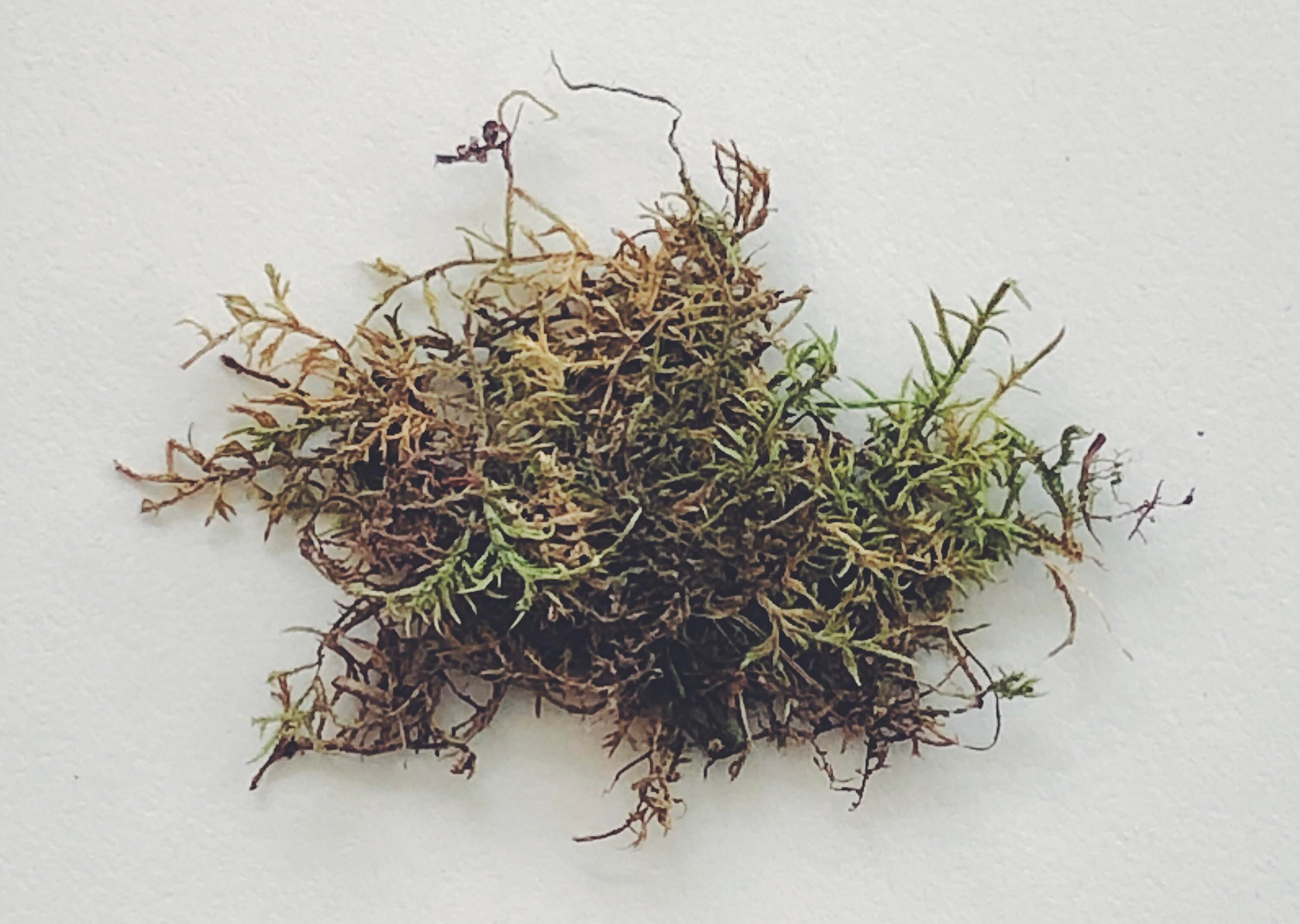

Scientific classification
- Kingdom: Plantae
- Division: Bryophyta
- Class: Bryopsida
- Subclass: Bryidae
- Order: Hypnales
- Family: Pylaisiadelphaceae
- Genus: Wijkia
- Species: W. extenuata

Binomial name
- Wijkia extenuata (Brid.) H.A.Crum

Varieties
- Wijkia extenuata var. caudata Fife; Wijkia extenuata (Brid.) H.A.Crum var. extenuata
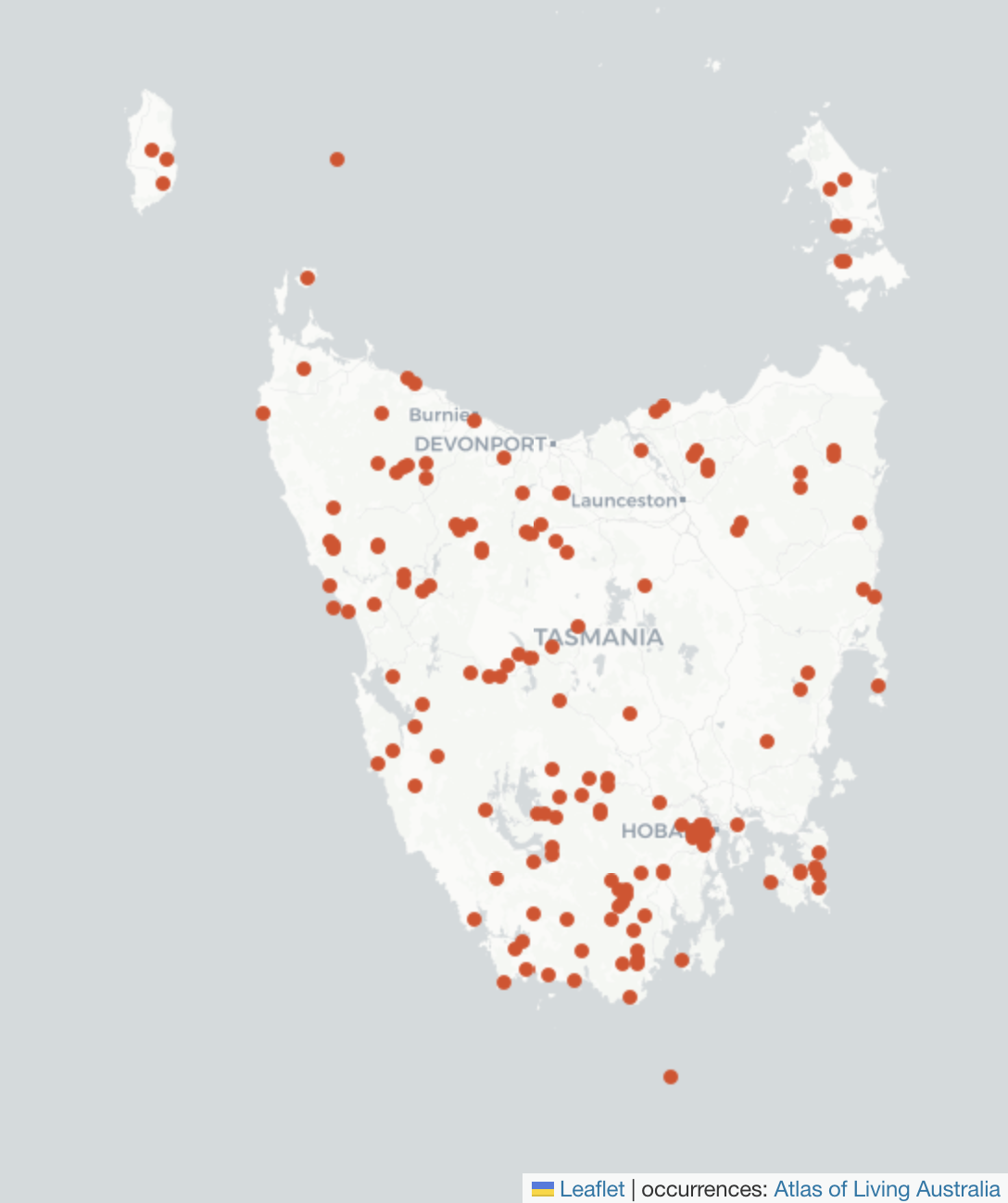
- Distribution of Wijkia extenuata in Tasmania, Australia from the Atlas of Living Australia.

Synonyms
- Hypnum extenuatum Brid.

= Wijkia extenuata =

Species of mosses

Wijkia extenuata, commonly known as spear moss or spiky wiki, is a species of moss from the family Pylaisiadelphaceae. It can be divided into two varieties Wijkia extenuata var. caudata and Wijkia extenuata var. extenuata. It is commonly found throughout the tropical, subtropical, and temperate forests of eastern Australasia and New Zealand.

== Taxonomy ==
Wijkia is a tropical to subtropical genus consisting of about 25-30 Old and New World species. This species' previous name Acanthocladium extenatum was replaced by Crum (1971) and is represented by a single species in Tasmania. and New Zealand The genus was previously placed in family Sematophyllaceae, but moved to the newly described Pylaisiadelphaceae when Sematophyllaceae was split on the basis of molecular DNA data. The genus was named in honour of Sir Roelof J. van der Wijk (1895-1981), a Dutch bryologist.

== Description ==
Wijkia extenuata is a variable species of small to medium-sized plant where the appearance of both varieties shares many of the same features. Both varieties are stiff, compactly branched plants with lose forming tufts to soft, pendulous forms. Plants are of yellow to brown-green or dark green colouration and turns golden with age with loosely interwoven mats. Stems are red, irregularly creep and are bipinnately or subpinnately branched about 12 cm (4.7 in) long. Branches pinnately or with simple branch, ascendant or creeping, and branchlets near tips are often with multiple flagelliform and microphyllous. The only very common distinction between variants is the presence of predominant branches. The “branch-only” growth does not develop flagelliform branches and are distinctive to the variation caudata.

Leaves in stem and branch are differentiated, and ecostate. Stem leaves are broadly ovate to lanceolate, appressed to erect and wide-spreading when dry, abruptly tapered to a slender with occasional serrulate, piliferous apex; about ~1-2mm long in primary leaves and around 1.5 mm (0.059 in) long in secondary leaves. Branch leaves lanceolate to ovate-lanceolate, smaller about 0.5–1 mm (0.020–0.039 in) long, sharply toothed, slenderer, erect to erect spreading, concave with gradually short acuminate to apex; occasional strong serrulate margins to the base and not piliferous. It is seemingly similar to the species Calliergonella cuspidata but differs with the distinctive long hairpoint on the leaves. The plant reproduces asexually through specialised flagelliform and deciduous branchlets with foliose, deltoid pseudoparaphyllia.

Its perichaetia are conspicuous, scattered and arising on stems; inner perichaetial leaves erect with long and sharp toothed acumen. Setae are red-brown, smooth, elongate, twisted to the left above, and 15–40 mm (0.59–1.57 in) long. Calyptra are smooth, and cucullate. Capsules about 1.5 mm (0.059 in) long, asymmetric, horizontal, oblong-cylindric below the mouth, and short neck. Annulus are differentiated, operculum base high-conic, blunt, arched, and lacks long rostrum. Peristomes are pale, double; strongly bordered and shouldered 16 exostome teeth with a zig-zag median line, trabeculae on inner surface; endostome 16 with perforated or keeled segments, high basal membrane, and cilia in single or pairs. Spores are about 12–16 μm in diameter, papillose, and spherical.

== Habitat and distribution ==
Both varieties of Wijkia extenuata are commonly found growing on logs or decaying wood, bases of trees, as an epiphyte, and rarely on rocks and soils. Both are a common species in wet forests and rainforests from east Australia (QLD, NSW, ACT, VIC, and TAS), Papua New Guinea, New Zealand, and Pacific Island nations such as Fiji.

== Gallery ==
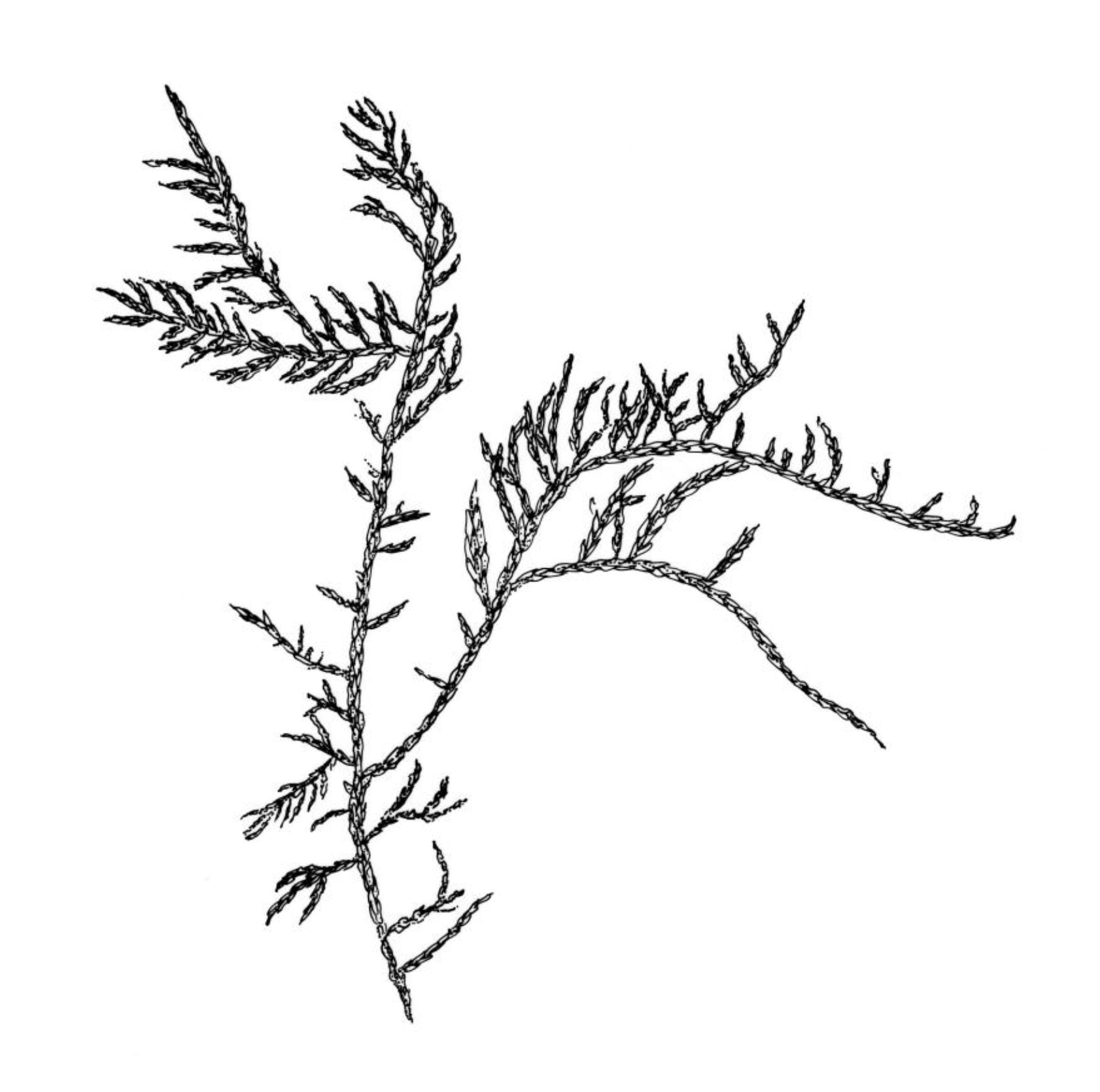
Wijkia extenuata caudata

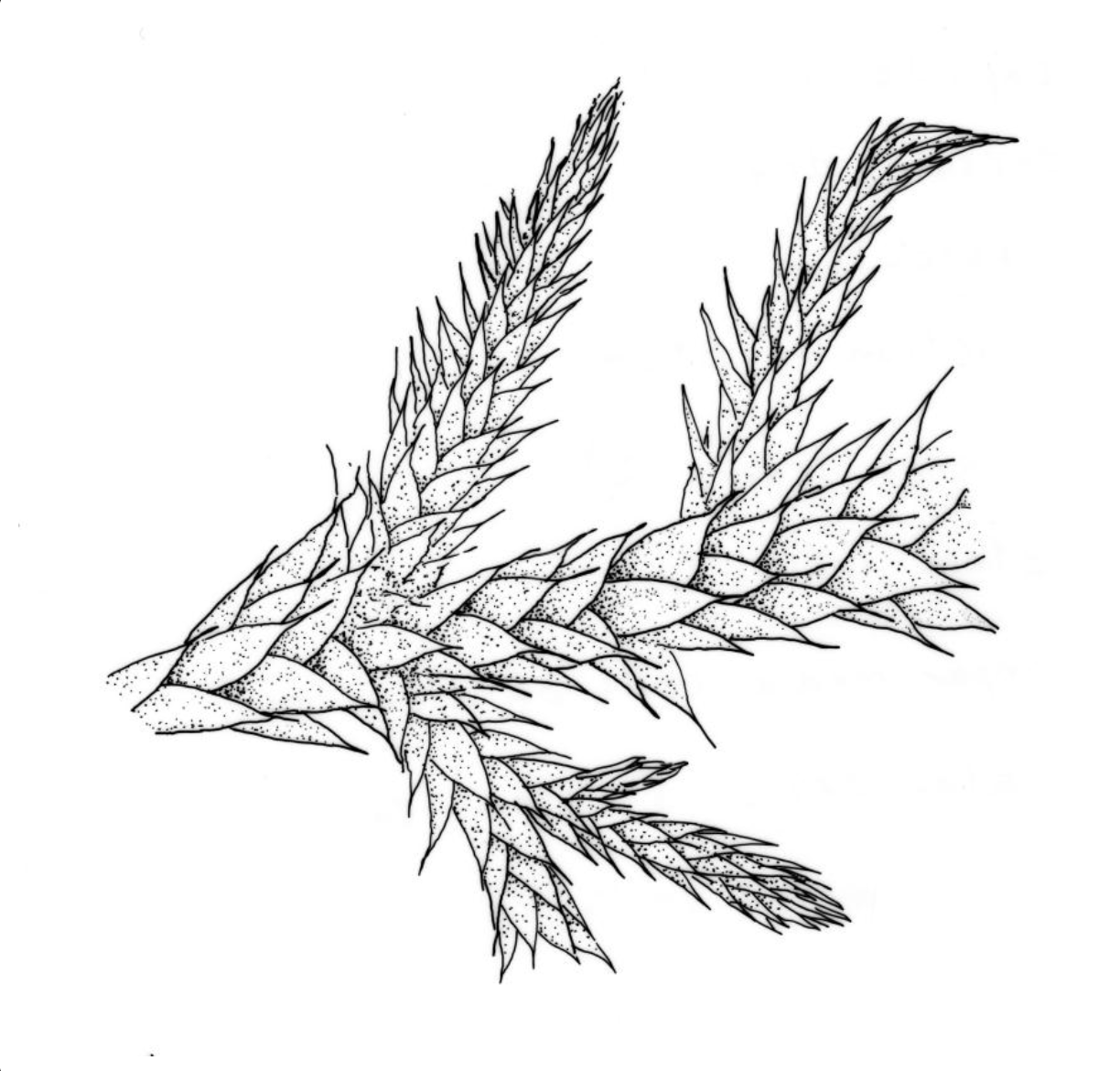
Wijkia extenuata extenuata

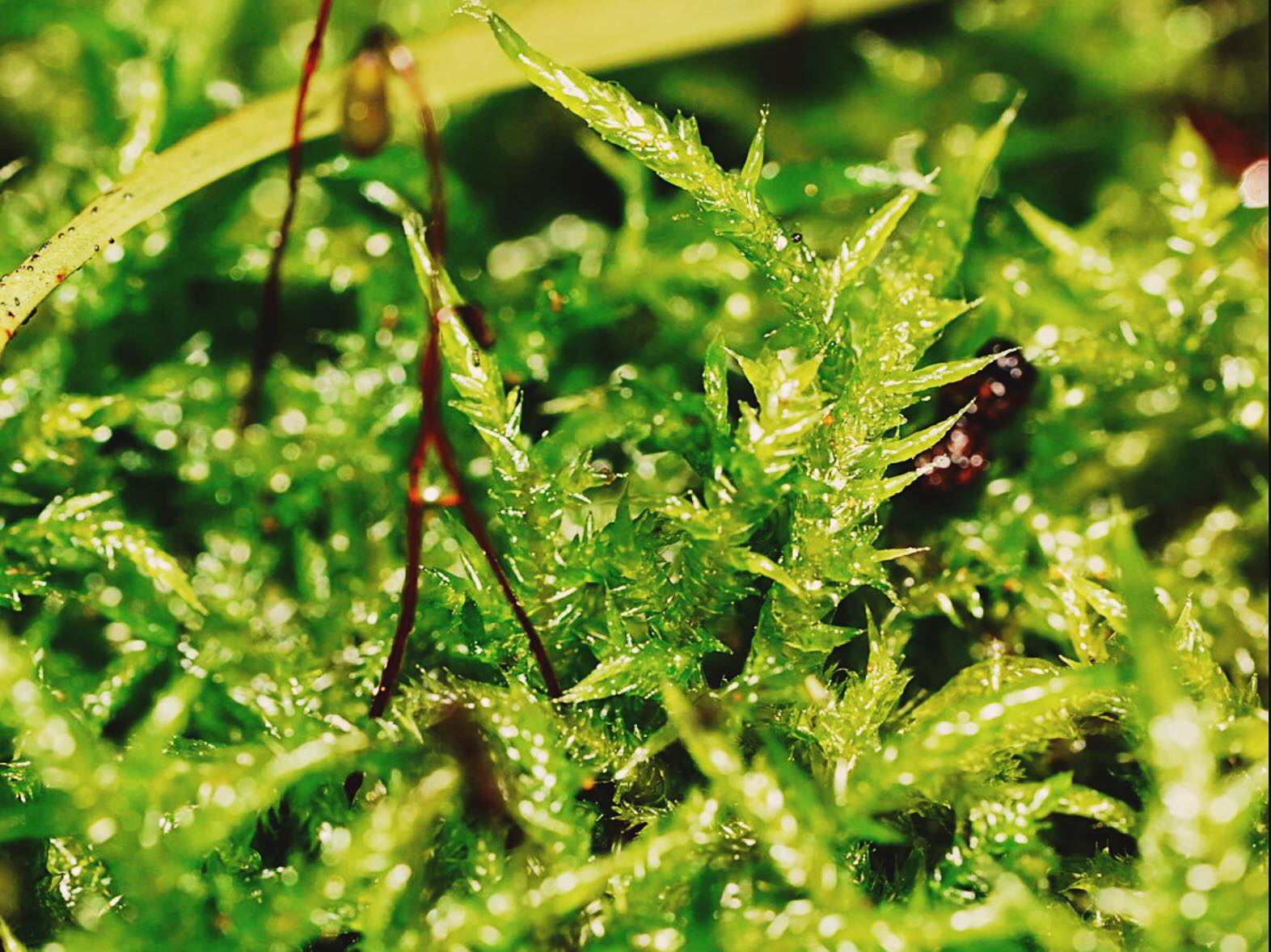
A variable Wijkia extenuata found near Growling Swallet, Tasmania
