= Gladstone Gaol =

Heritage-listed prison in South Australia, used 1881–1975

Coordinates: 33.262°S 138.356°E

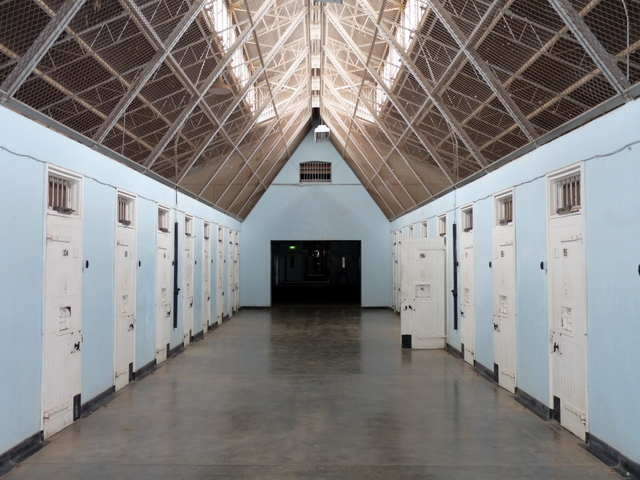
- Interactive map of Gladstone Gaol
- Location: Gladstone, South Australia
- Status: Closed
- Capacity: 86
- Opened: 1881
- Closed: 1975
- Managed by: Department for Environment and Water, Government of South Australia

Gladstone Gaol is a historic former prison in Gladstone, South Australia. Built between 1879 and 1881, it was eventually closed in 1975 and opened to tourists in 1978. It state heritage-listed.

== History ==
The prison was built between 1879 and 1881. It was built to address chronic overcrowding in regional prisons in South Australia, and was built to a model prison plan by the then governor of Bristol Prison in England. It was designed to house both male and female prisoners from the beginning. The prison was built by Messrs. Sara and Dunstan, from local Gladstone stone. It was the first prison in South Australia to restrict prisoner contact with visitors, separating them "by iron gratings nine feet apart, with a warder between" so conversations could be overheard and contraband restricted. Its capacity was 86 prisoners.

The first prisoner arrived on 8 June 1881. It was reported to be lightly used in its early decades; one report stated that "the only 'lifer' was a cat called Lady Jane Grey".

The prison saw a significant industrial dispute regarding sacked warders in 1921, which saw the involvement of future MP Frank Nieass as the secretary of their union. Issues had further arisen regarding the treatment of prisoners at Gladstone by the 1920s. In 1924, a released prisoner told The News that "any man who has served six months in Gladstone Gaol has been through hell". In 1925, Chief Secretary James Jelley inspected the jail to investigate issues around the "harshness of confinement".

In 1939, all its prisoners were transferred to Adelaide Gaol and Gladstone Gaol was taken over by the military for use as an internment camp. for Nazi sympathisers. Its use as an internment camp was not long lived; it was used as a military detention barracks for a period, but spent much of the next fifteen years in a state of disuse.

The prison was reopened in September 1952, after repairs and renovations, as a result of difficulties regarding the imprisonment of young offenders at Yatala Prison; it was to house mostly males under 25 years away from "hardened criminals" and teach them skilled trades, while decreasing overcrowding at Yatala. The prison closed permanently in 1975 due to its facilities having become outdated.

== Heritage listing ==
The prison was listed as a State Heritage Place on the South Australian Heritage Register in March 1985.

== Tourism ==
The prison was opened to visitors in 1978, though closed in June 2022 for repairs, following the previous caretakers surrendering their licence to operate the gaol as a tourist attraction. Repairs were originally due to be completed by the end of 2022; however, the gaol remained closed due to delays in the repairs being undertaken.

It was announced in June 2026 that the gaol would be reopened as a tourist attraction in late 2026, operated by Lantern Ghost Tours.
