= Narridy, South Australia =

Coordinates: 33°26′S 138°18′E

Narridy South Australia
- Population: 59 (SAL 2021)
- Postcode(s): 5523
- LGA(s): Northern Areas Council
- State electorate(s): Frome
- Federal division(s): Grey
Localities around Narridy:
Huddleston; Crystal Brook	Huddleston; Georgetown	Georgetown
Crystal Brook	Narridy	Georgetown
Redhill	Koolunga	Gulnare

Narridy is a locality in the Mid North region of South Australia, situated within the Northern Areas Council.

The surrounding cadastral Hundred of Narridy was proclaimed by Governor Sir James Fergusson in 1871 as part of the areas opened up for selection under the Strangways Land Act. The government town of Narridy was surveyed in July of the same year. The modern locality was established in April 2001 for the long established name, and formally absorbed the former government town. The current boundaries do not cover the entire Hundred of Narridy: the north-eastern quarter lies in Georgetown, while the village of Huddleston to the north-west has been gazette as a separate locality.

The name of the town is believed to have been derived from Narrinde, the name of the native tribes of the lower North.

It was the seat of its own municipality, the District Council of Narridy, from 1876 to 1888. Narridy Post Office opened in December 1873 and closed on 31 August 1974. The Narridy Cemetery was gazette on 7 September 1872 and reverted to Crown land on 9 July 1985.

It formerly had a hotel, the Narridy Hotel, which served as a meeting place for the local area. The building had a dramatic partial collapse on 19 August 1904 and does not appear to have reopened. The liquor licence was transferred to a new hotel at Gulnare in June 1907, and the remainder of the building and fittings were advertised for sale in the same month. The licence transfer was the source of some controversy, but it was successful, and the building was subsequently let to a local resident.

Its school opened in 1878 and closed in 1967, the hundred of Narridy School opened in 1886 and closed in 1891. It reopened the same year as Rocky River.

In 1876, Narridy was described as "a smaller place but the centre of an important district", boasting Messrs. Porter & Roberts's mill, "a fine hotel, a saddler's, a wheelwright's and blacksmith's shop, a store, a chapel and schoolroom and a few private buildings". The village had declined sharply by 1905, when another visiting journalist described Narridy as "not nearly so flourishing as in the early days of its existence, and in point of size the town is one of the smallest on the map. One store and a public house about comprise the business places, but several dilapidated buildings and ruins testify to past prosperity."

The Country Fire Service station at Narridy opened in 1957.
