= Trend Drinks =

Australian soft drink company

Trend Drinks was a manufacturer of soft drinks in Gladstone in the Southern Flinders Ranges of South Australia from 1876 until 2015.

Trend Drinks was the last locally owned regional soft drink manufacturer in South Australia. Historically, South Australia had several regional independent soft drink manufacturers, but the growth of international brands has led to the decline of local independent bottlers.

== History ==
The company was founded in the 1870s, in Gladstone, South Australia. The business was a partnership of Amore Syrups and Damian Casey. In 2015, the Caseys sold the business to Beechworth Heritage Drinks and relocated to Corowa, New South Wales. Trend Drinks, under the F.C. Grubb brand continues to be produced in New South Wales.

== Flavours ==
Trend drinks manufactured niche market products along with traditional soft drinks and cordials, such as Ginger Beer, Sarsaparilla, Portello and Cream Soda.

They also manufactured honey based beverages and a carbonated chocolate flavoured drink.

== See also ==
- List of South Australian manufacturing businesses
- South Australian food and drink
