= Brenton Miels =

Australian rules footballer

Personal information
- Full name: Brenton Robyn Miels
- Born: 12 January 1948; Laura, South Australia
- Died: 19 October 1997 (aged 49); Adelaide, South Australia
- Height: 183 cm (6 ft 0 in)
- Weight: 77 kg (170 lb)

Playing career^{1}
Years	Club	Games (Goals)
1965–1968, 1970–1977	Sturt	202
1969–1970	Richmond	7 (1)
- ^{1} Playing statistics correct to the end of 1977.

Brenton Robyn Miels (12 January 1948 – 19 October 1997) was an Australian rules footballer who played for Sturt in the South Australian National Football League (SANFL) from 1965 until 1968 and then again from 1970 to 1977 during which time he played in Premiership sides in 1966, 1967, 1968, 1970, 1974 and 1976. Miels played on the wing and kicked 98 goals for Sturt. He was made a player life member of Sturt in 1973, Player Life Member of the SANFL in 1975 and was posthumously inducted into the Sturt Football Club Hall of Fame in 2009.

Miels played with the Richmond Football Club in the Victorian Football League (VFL) from 1969 to 1970 whilst serving national service with the Australian Army.
