= Bundaleer North, South Australia =

Bundaleer North
- Town
- Coordinates: 33.274°S 138.59°E
- Country: Australia
- State: South Australia
- LGA: Northern Areas Council

Government
  - State electorate: Stuart
  - Federal division: Grey

Population
  - Total: 38 (SAL 2021)
- Postcode: 5491
Localities around Bundaleer North
| Caltowie | Jamestown | Belalie East |
| West Bundaleer | Bundaleer North | Belalie East |
| Bundaleer Gardens | Washpool | Mayfield |

Bundaleer North is a rural locality in the Mid North region of South Australia, situated in the Northern Areas Council. Its modern boundaries were established in April 2001 for the long-established local name. Bundaleer North is divided by the RM Williams Way between the Bundaleer Forest Reserve to the west and agricultural land to the east.

== History ==
Much of the agricultural land to the east of RM Williams Way was among the areas purchased by the state government and divided up for closer settlement programs in the early twentieth century. The North Bundaleer Estate was allotted in 1912, following its purchase the previous year. A subsequent area, known as Moore's Farm, was purchased and allotted to existing North Bundaleer Estate residents in 1918 due to concerns about the viability of the size of the 1912 blocks.

The modern boundaries of Bundaleer North were established in April 2001.

=== North Bundaleer Homestead ===
The North Bundaleer Homestead, from the original station predating the closer settlement subdivision, survives today and is also listed on the South Australian Heritage Register.

The homestead was built in 1901 by George and Catherine Maslin, as part of their family's 60,000-acre (24,000 ha) sheep station running more than 90,000 sheep. The property was broken up into 57 units after the passing of the Closer Settlement Acts, leaving the homestead standing on just 1,500 acres (610 ha). The home was abandoned and the surrounding land used for farming.

After the 162-hectare (400-acre) property had become derelict and condemned in the 1970s, it was bought by Sydney couple Marianne and Malcolm Booth in 1999, who restored it and turned it into luxury tourist accommodation. The couple put the property on the market in October 2013 for A$2.8 million. The homestead went under contract but did not sell, and went on the market again in 2015 for A$2.5 million. The owners then sold off much of its land until just 24 ha (59 acres) remained by 2017, when Malcolm put it on the market again after Marianne had died. At that time, the property had two outbuildings, a wine cellar, the original dressed-stone woolshed, and provided accommodation for four couples, although it was not being sold as a business but this time just as a property.

== Location, governance, and description ==
Bundaleer North is a rural locality in the Mid North region of South Australia, situated in the Northern Areas Council. Bundaleer North is divided by the RM Williams Way between the Bundaleer Forest Reserve to the west and agricultural land to the east. Its modern boundaries were established in April 2001 for the long-established local name.

It lies in the state electoral district of Stuart and in the Division of Grey for federal government.

Its postcode is 5491.

== Bundaleer Forest ==
The Bundaleer Forest Reserve, established in 1875, was the first plantation for timber production in Australia and the first state forest in South Australia. It was used to sell hardwood logs commercially in its early decades, but expanded into sawn timber after the construction of a sawmill by the Verran government in 1910. It is known as the "birthplace of Australian forestry", and as of 2016 covers an area of 3,200 ha (7,900 acres). It is open to the public, with camping available from April to November, but is still used for forestry operations. The reserve includes the Bundaleer Picnic Ground and the Bundaleer Arboretum. Three sites associated with the reserve, the Conservator's Hut, the former Forest Office and the 1876 Nursery Site, are jointly listed on the South Australian Heritage Register. The Conservator's Hut has been restored and is now used for accommodation purposes.

The Forest Reserve was sold in 2017, but a group of locals worked hard to retain the picnic ground precinct in the forest. The Bundaleer Forest Community Areas Association became the custodian of the forest, and in December 2020 the Maple & Pine function venue, catering for indoor and outdoor events, opened. The venue was funded by A$660,000 in grants from federal, state, and local governments grants, as well as over A$500,000 raised by the community. The association has forged partnerships with local Nukunu and Ngadjuri people to connect and share cultures, there is an adventure playground for children, and the forest remains open to the public.

== Bundaleer Weekend and Bundaleer Festival ==
The Bundaleer Weekend, later known as Bundaleer Festival, described as a "sports/arts" event, was established in 1999, founded by Adelaide tenor Brian Gilbertson and based on a community development model by Julie Sloan in which the local community participated in running the event. The Adelaide Symphony Orchestra as well as well-known opera singers performed in the inaugural year, and ASO continued to perform there until 2009. On the Sunday, there was a Forest Walk, first mapped by local farmer John Malone. The event continue on a biennial basis until 2013.

In 2003, Roz Hervey was artistic director of this event, which involved 30 performances of music, poetry, theatre, acrobatics, sport, and dance in the forest, for visitors to explore on the Sunday afternoon of the weekend.

Later festivals hosted Cheryl Barker and New Zealand singer Teddy Tahu Rhodes. In 2007 the festival won a Ruby Award. In 2011, the Adelaide Art Orchestra, conducted by Timothy Sexton, played at the festival, as well as jazz trumpeter James Morrison and clarinettist Andy Firth.

In March 2013, soprano Greta Bradman, tenor Rosario La Spina, and jazz singer Emma Pask headlined the festival, and Peter Combe performed for the children. In that year the event was chaired by Leith Cooper as part of the Adelaide Fringe program, but it was still organised by the local community. This was the final event in the series.

In March 2022, there was a two-night musical event held in the new Maple & Pine venue in the forest as part of the Fringe.

== See also ==
- Hundred of Bundaleer
