= Jamestown, South Australia =

Jamestown
- City
- Coordinates: 33°12′19″S 138°36′7″E
- Country: Australia
- State: South Australia
- LGA: Northern Areas Council
- Location: 207 km (129 mi) N of Adelaide; 66 km (41 mi) E of Port Pirie; 43 km (27 mi) SW of Peterborough
- Established: 1871

Government
  - State electorate: Stuart
  - Federal division: Grey

Population
  - Total: 1,389 (UCL 2021)
- Postcode: 5491
Localities around Jamestown
Hornsdale	Mannanarie	Yongala; Sunnybrae
Caltowie; Caltowie North	Jamestown	Belalie North
Caltowie; West Bundaleer	Bundaleer North	Belalie East

Jamestown is a town in the Mid North region of South Australia 207 kilometres (129 mi) north of Adelaide. It lies on the banks of the Belalie Creek and on the Crystal Brook-Broken Hill railway line between Gladstone and Peterborough, and ultimately on the main line linking Adelaide and Perth to Sydney. Jamestown is the council seat of its local municipality, Northern Areas Council. Jamestown is in the South Australian Legislative Assembly electoral district of Stuart and the federal Division of Grey.

== Description ==
Jamestown (originally James Town) was named after Sir James Fergusson, the Governor of South Australia when the town was surveyed in 1871. Its streets are all named for towns in his native Scotland.

Major products of the area are grain, legumes, wool and timber. The world's first plantation forest was the Bundaleer Forest first planted in the area in 1876. The local area had first been granted self-government as the District Council of Belalie in 1875, but the township of Jamestown itself had separated as the Corporate Town of Jamestown in 1878. The Belalie council, comprising the surrounding areas, merged into the new District Council of Jamestown in 1935. Jamestown continued with two municipalities, one for the town and one for the surrounding area, until their amalgamation in 1991; the amalgamated municipality then merged into the new Northern Areas Council in 1997.

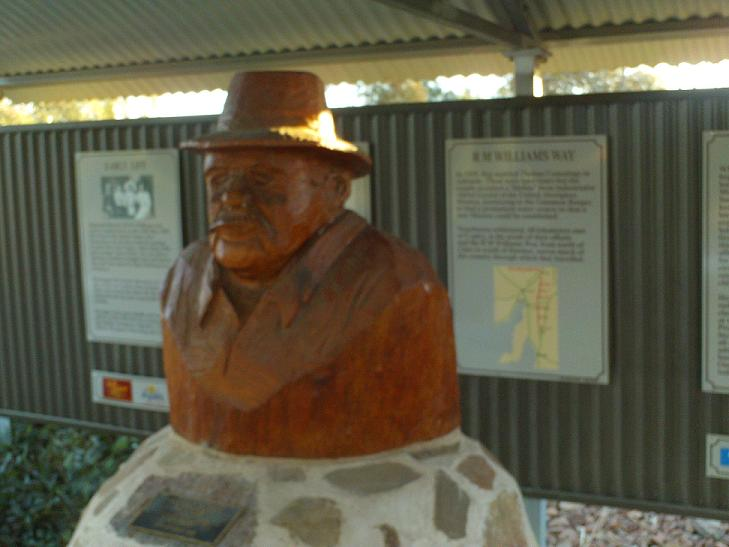
R. M. Williams Monument, Jamestown South Australia

In July 2017, US tech giant Tesla won a bid to build a 129 megawatt hour (MWh) battery at Hornsdale Wind Farm at nearby Hornsdale. It was completed on 25 November 2017, and was the largest of its kind in the world. This was the first ever major battery storage installed on a country's power grid.

Jamestown was the home of the Belalie Lofts. Spencer Morgan Evans was a racing pigeon fancier and owner of these lofts. He imported the best long distance pigeons from England at great expense around the early 20th century. His birds were purchased by other fanciers all over Australia, New Zealand and America.

Historical population
Year	Pop.	±%
1921	1,360	—
1933	1,454	+6.9%
1947	1,386	−4.7%
1954	1,489	+7.4%
1961	1,304	−12.4%
1966	1,392	+6.7%
1971	1,331	−4.4%
1976	1,325	−0.5%
1981	1,384	+4.5%
1986	1,372	−0.9%
1991	1,359	−0.9%
1996	1,430	+5.2%
2001	1,356	−5.2%
2006	1,407	+3.8%
2011	1,406	−0.1%
2016	1,392	−1.0%
2021	1,389	−0.2%
Source: Australian Bureau of Statistics data.

== Notable people ==
Sir John Cockburn was the citie's first mayor, doctor, and later Premier of South Australia in 1889–1890.

Jamestown is the birthplace of Australian bush legend, Reginald Murray Williams (1908–2003), better known as R. M. Williams, the bush outfitter; Sir Raphael Cilento (1893–1985), tropical medicine pioneer, noted public servant and father of actress Diane Cilento; Paul Cronin (1938–2019), actor; and Edgar Mayne (1882-1961), test cricketer.

== Military history ==
Jamestown has proud military history, with monuments featured within the township. The Memorial Park features a restored 1907 Krupp SFH02 Cannon. It was captured in Palestine in November 1917 as part of the World War I campaign. In 1918 the Cannon was ceded to the 9th Australian Light Horse Regiment in the initial distribution of captured weapons.

== Heritage listings ==
- 21 Ayr Street: National Australia Bank Building
- 42 Ayr Street: Eudunda Farmers Store
- Irvine Street: Trooper Goodes Memorial
- 5 Irvine Street : Jamestown Post Office and Dwelling

== Events ==
In the spring of 2016, the city had three events taking place – Jamestown Racing Club annual Horse racing meeting with the Jamestown Cup, a Mural Fest and the Jamestown Show.
