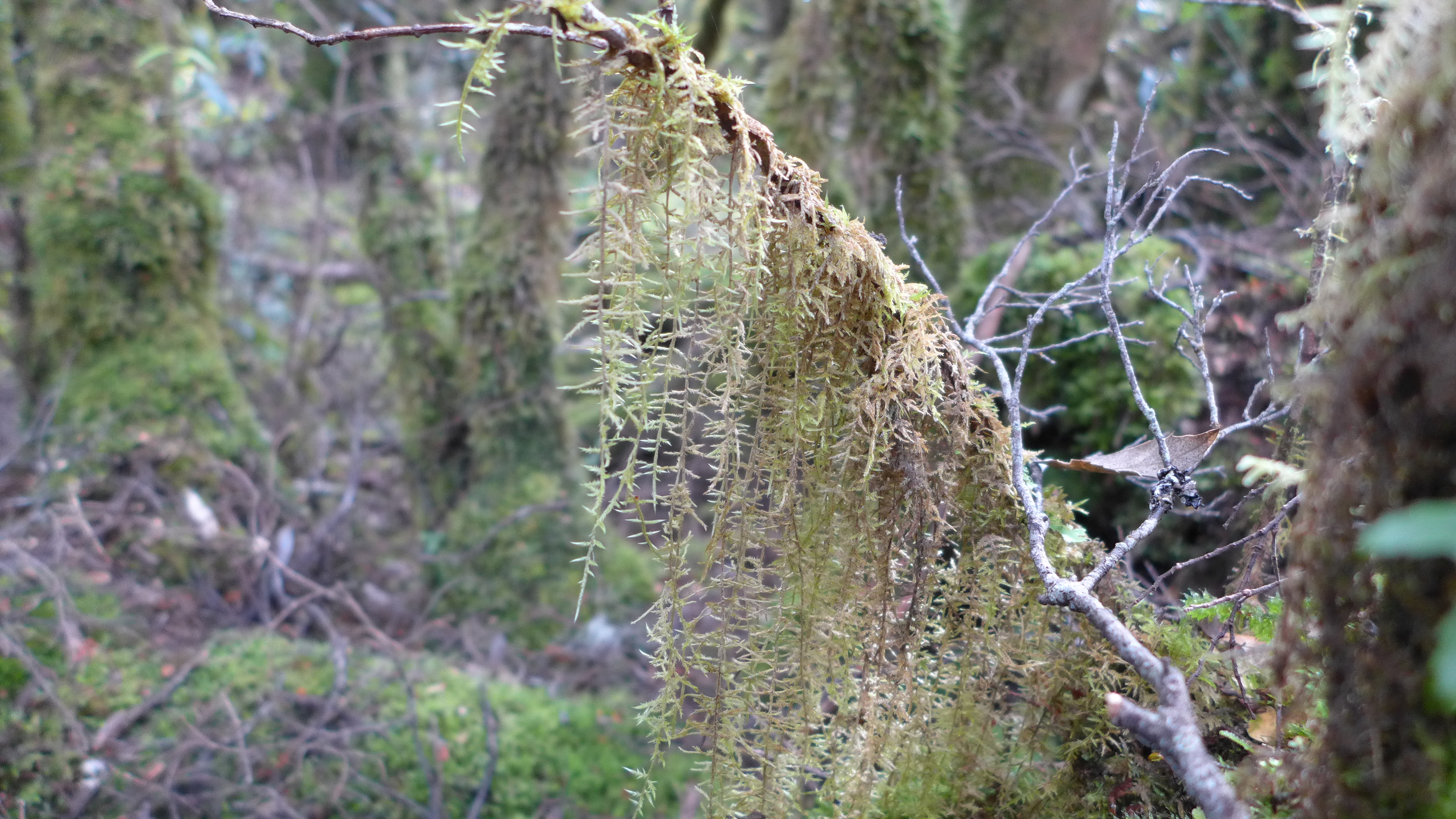

Scientific classification
- Kingdom: Plantae
- Division: Bryophyta
- Class: Bryopsida
- Subclass: Bryidae
- Order: Hypnales
- Family: Pylaisiadelphaceae
- Genus: Wijkia; H.A.Crum

= Wijkia =

Genus of mosses

Wijkia is a genus of mosses belonging to the family Pylaisiadelphaceae, with its species found in Southeastern Asia, Africa, Australia and America.

This tropical to subtropical genus consists of about 25-30 Old and New World species, and some notable species are:

- Wijkia albescens H.Crum, 1971
- Wijkia alboalaris Manuel, 1981
- Wijkia extenuata H. Crum, 1971
