= Laura, South Australia =

Laura
- Town
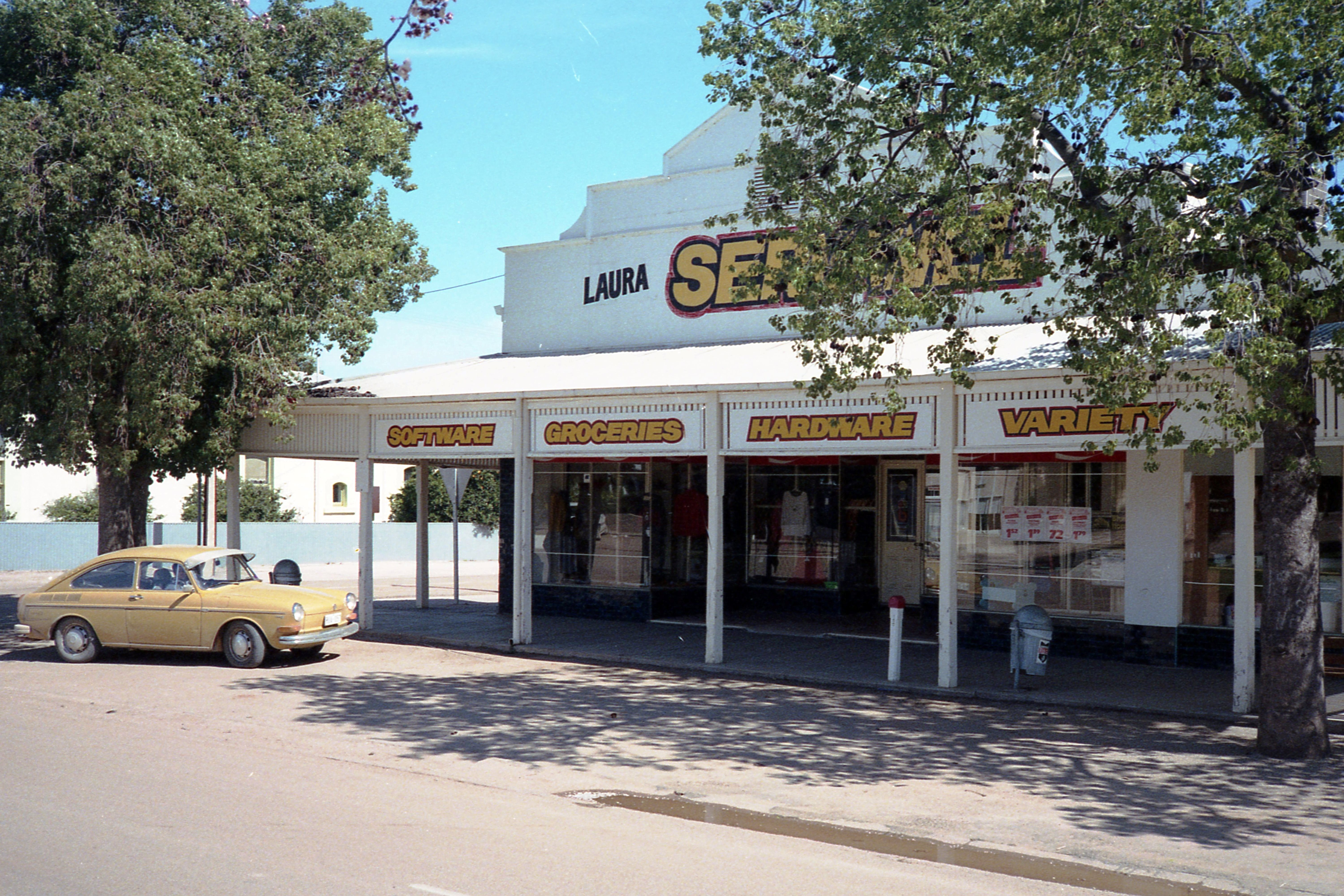
- Main street, Laura c. 2000

- Coordinates: 33°11′12″S 138°18′01″E
- Country: Australia
- State: South Australia
- Region: Yorke and Mid North
- LGA: Northern Areas Council
- Location: 12 km (7.5 mi) north of Gladstone; 40 km (25 mi) E of Port Pirie
- Established: December 1871 (town), April 2001 (locality)

Government
  - State electorate: Stuart
  - Federal division: Grey
- Elevation (former railway station): 248 m (814 ft)

Population
  - Total: 522 (UCL 2021)
- Time zone: UTC+9:30 (ACST)
  - Summer (DST): UTC+10:30 (ACDT)
- Postcode: 5480
- County: Victoria
Localities around Laura
Beetaloo Valley	Stone Hut	Caltowie West
Beetaloo Valley	Laura	Caltowie West; Gladstone
Beetaloo Valley	Gladstone	Gladstone

Laura is a rural town in the Mid North region of South Australia, 12 kilometres (7.5 mi) north of Gladstone on the Horrocks Highway and 40 kilometres (25 mi) east of Port Pirie. The first European to explore the district was Thomas Burr in September 1842. His promising reports soon led to occupation of the district by pastoralists, one of whom was Herbert Bristow Hughes (c. 1821 – 18 May 1892). When the present town was surveyed he named it for his wife, Laura née White (c. 1829 – 5 January 1909).

Laura is administered by the Northern Areas Council, and is in the state electoral district of Stuart and the federal Division of Grey. It was formerly the council seat of the Corporate Town of Laura (1882–1932) and the District Council of Laura (1932–1988), as well as the District Council of Booyoolie (1876–1932), which covered the area surrounding the township.

The Laura Community Development and Tourism Association Incorporated liaises with the Northern Areas Council in preserving the amenity of the rural centre, with the support of many volunteers in community projects. The LCDTA's major project is operating the community-owned Laura Caravan Park. Profits from the caravan park operations are then used for improvements in the township.

The Spiny Daisy (Acanthocladium dockeri) was rediscovered in 1999 near Laura. The species, which was last seen in the South Australian Riverland in 1910, was found along a roadside.

== Attractions ==
Laura is famous as the home of Golden North ice cream which has been manufactured in the town since 1923 (the factory being the biggest employer in the district) In July 2025 management announced the imminent move of the factory to the old Beston cheese works at Murray Bridge, citing loss of milk suppliers in the Lower North and increased business opportunities.

The Laura Fair is held over two days annually on the first weekend of April. Initiated by Dick Biles of the Rocky River Historic and Art Society, and wholly volunteer driven, it has been held every year since, apart from the COVID years. Laura is a vibrant, artistic rural community with a population of approximately 650, situated beside the Rocky River and amongst the rolling hills of the Southern Flinders Ranges.

The Laura Markets are a fundraising event held on the first Saturday of March, May, July, September, November & December at the Laura Memorial Civic Centre.

The Wilmington railway line was built from Gladstone railway station to Laura in 1884. It was extended from Laura in 1910 to Booleroo Centre, and finally to Wilmington in 1915. Passenger services ended in 1969, and it was formally closed in 1990.

The former Laura Courthouse in Hughes Street is listed on the South Australian Heritage Register.

Historical population
Year	Pop.	±%
1921	634	—
1933		—
1947		—
1954		—
1961	598	—
1966	505	−15.6%
1971	505	+0.0%
1976	472	−6.5%
1981	504	+6.8%
1986	512	+1.6%
1991	521	+1.8%
1996	507	−2.7%
2001	503	−0.8%
2006	570	+13.3%
2011	499	−12.5%
2016	478	−4.2%
2021	522	+9.2%
Source: Australian Bureau of Statistics data.

== Media ==
Between 1889 and 1948, Laura had its own newspaper, the Standard. Its first iteration, Laura Standard (subtitled: and Beetaloo, Wirrabara, Melrose, Booleroo Centre and Yarrowie Advertiser) ran from 1889. In 1917 it merged with Crystal Brook Times to form Laura Standard and Crystal Brook Courier. In 1948, this newspaper then merged with Areas' Express and Agriculturist and Review to form Northern Review (later becoming The Flinders News).

== Notable residents ==
- C. J. Dennis (1876–1938), poet and writer
- Gordon Jackett (1887–1951), politician
- Brenton Miels (1948–1997), Australian Rules footballer
