= Canowie, South Australia =

Canowie South Australia
- Coordinates: 33.39°S 138.76°E
- Population: 3 (SAL 2021)
- Established: 1865
- Postcode(s): 5419
- LGA(s): Regional Council of Goyder
- State electorate(s): Stuart
- Federal division(s): Grey
Localities around Canowie:
| | Belalie East |
| Mayfield | Canowie | Hallett |
| Hacklins Corner | Willalo |

Canowie is a sparsely populated farming and grazing locality in the Mid North region of South Australia in the Hundred of Anne, County of Victoria. It is mainly sited on a relatively featureless plain, with the north-south trending Browne Hill Range to the west.

A government sponsored town was surveyed in 1865 but it failed to thrive and so virtually nothing remains of the township today. The current boundaries of the locality were created in 2000.

The locality is on the former pastoral leases of Canowie Station. It is believed that the Canowie station derived its name from Kanya-Owie, the Aboriginal name for a rock waterhole at the station homestead.

The town was positioned on a major north-south travelling stock route where an ephemeral creek, Cundowie Creek, provided water for a public livestock pound. It followed the usual South Australian layout of a grid of streets surrounded by a generous belt of parklands. Street names and lot numbers appear in the Surveyor-General's plan, together with a water reserve and cemetery reserve.

Sections of land were offered for sale by public auction but there were hardly any takers. As at 1870 the town had only two residents. A general store operated for some years and a Canowie Post Office opened on 1 September 1867. This was subsequently removed to Canowie Station homestead and closed on 22 February 1924.

The town was declared to have been diminished in December 1930.

Old Canowie, the homestead remnant of the former Canowie Station pastoral lease, is located some eleven kilometres due north and is now in the locality of Belalie East.

The Canowie district has the Hallett Power Station gas-fired power station within its bounds, and the Browne Hill part of the Hallett Wind Farm along the western boundary.
