= Narien Range =

Range of hills in South Australia

- Mount Lock Range
- Location within South Australia

Highest point
- Coordinates: 32.937420°S 138.604360°E

Geography
- Country: Australia
- State: South Australia
- Region: Mid North
- Range coordinates: 32°56′15″S 138°36′16″E

The Narien Range (also known as Mount Lock Range, the Mannanarie Hills or Tarcowie Hills) is a range of hills in South Australia's Mid North. The range stretches from a point north of Jamestown northwards to Orroroo.

The south-western slopes are home to the Hornsdale Wind Farm.

The name Narien is officially thought to be derived from John Narrien (1782-1860), a mathematics master who taught George Grey, Governor of South Australia in 1851 at the time of the first recorded use of the name.
