= Wilmington railway line =

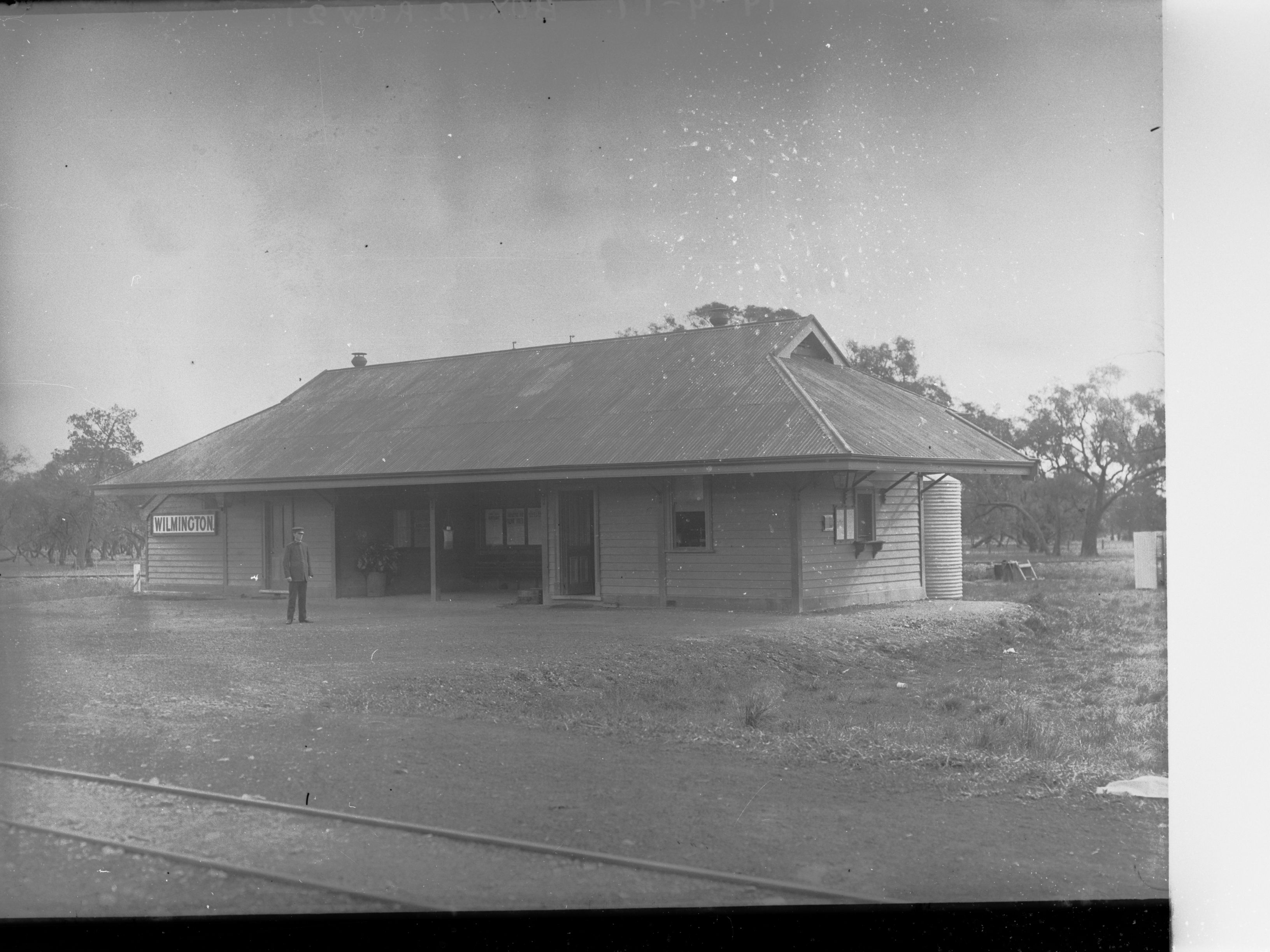
- Wilmington railway station (1910)

Overview
- Status: Closed and removed
- Locale: Mid North, South Australia
- Termini: Gladstone; Wilmington
- Continues from: Hamley Bridge-Gladstone line

Service
- System: South Australian Railways
- Operator(s): South Australian Railways; Australian National

History
- Opened: Gladstone-Laura: 2 June 1884; Laura-Booleroo Centre: 13 April 1910; Booleroo Centre-Wilmington: 20 July 1915
- Closed: 14 March 1990

Technical
- Line length: 87.5 km (54.4 mi)
- Track gauge: 1,067 mm (3 ft 6 in)

The Wilmington railway line was a railway line on the South Australian Railways network. It opened from Gladstone to Laura on 2 June 1884. It was extended from Laura to Booleroo Centre on 13 April 1910, and to Wilmington on 20 July 1915.

There were proposals to extend the line towards Port Augusta either through Horrocks Pass or via Quorn, but neither plan was acted upon.

With the conversion of the Port Pirie to Broken Hill line from narrow to standard gauge in 1969, the line became an isolated narrow gauge railway. Passenger services ceased at this time, with the line formally closed on 13 March 1990.
