= Gladstone railway station, South Australia =

Railway station in South Australia

Gladstone
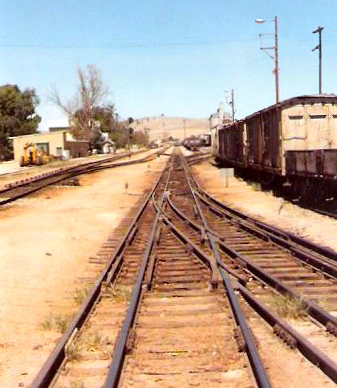
- Gladstone yard in March 1986

General information
- Location: Port Street, Gladstone
- Coordinates: 33.2697°S 138.3578°E
- Operator: Journey Beyond
- Line: Crystal Brook-Broken Hill
- Platforms: 1

Construction
- Structure type: Ground

Other information
- Status: Unstaffed

History
- Opened: 1876

Services
Preceding station	Australian Rail Track Corporation	Following station
Caltowie towards Crystal Brook	Crystal Brook–Broken Hill railway line	Huddleston towards Broken Hill
Preceding station	Australian National Railways Commission	Following station
Georgetown towards Adelaide	Gladstone railway line	Terminus
Preceding station	Australian National Railways Commission	Following station
Terminus	Wilmington railway line	Laura towards Wilmington
Location

Gladstone railway station is located on the Crystal Brook-Broken Hill line in Gladstone, South Australia.

== History ==
Gladstone station opened in 1876 when a line opened from Port Pirie in the west, it was later extended east to Peterborough and ultimately Broken Hill. In 1888, a line was built north to Laura and ultimately Wilmington. When the Hamley Bridge line from Balaklava in the south reached Gladstone in 1894, it became a four-way junction station. All were built as narrow gauge lines.

In 1927, the line from the south was converted to broad gauge, making Gladstone a break of gauge station. As part of the standardisation project, the line between Port Augusta and Broken Hill was converted to standard gauge in 1969, thus Gladstone became a junction for three gauges.

The broad-gauge connection between Gladstone and Adelaide was closed in May 1988. The narrow-gauge Wilmington railway line was closed in 1990 thus making Gladstone an only standard gauge station on the Crystal Brook-Broken Hill railway line.

== Services ==
Journey Beyond's weekly Indian Pacific service between Sydney and Perth passes through Gladstone but does not stop.
