= Gladstone, South Australia =

Gladstone
- Town
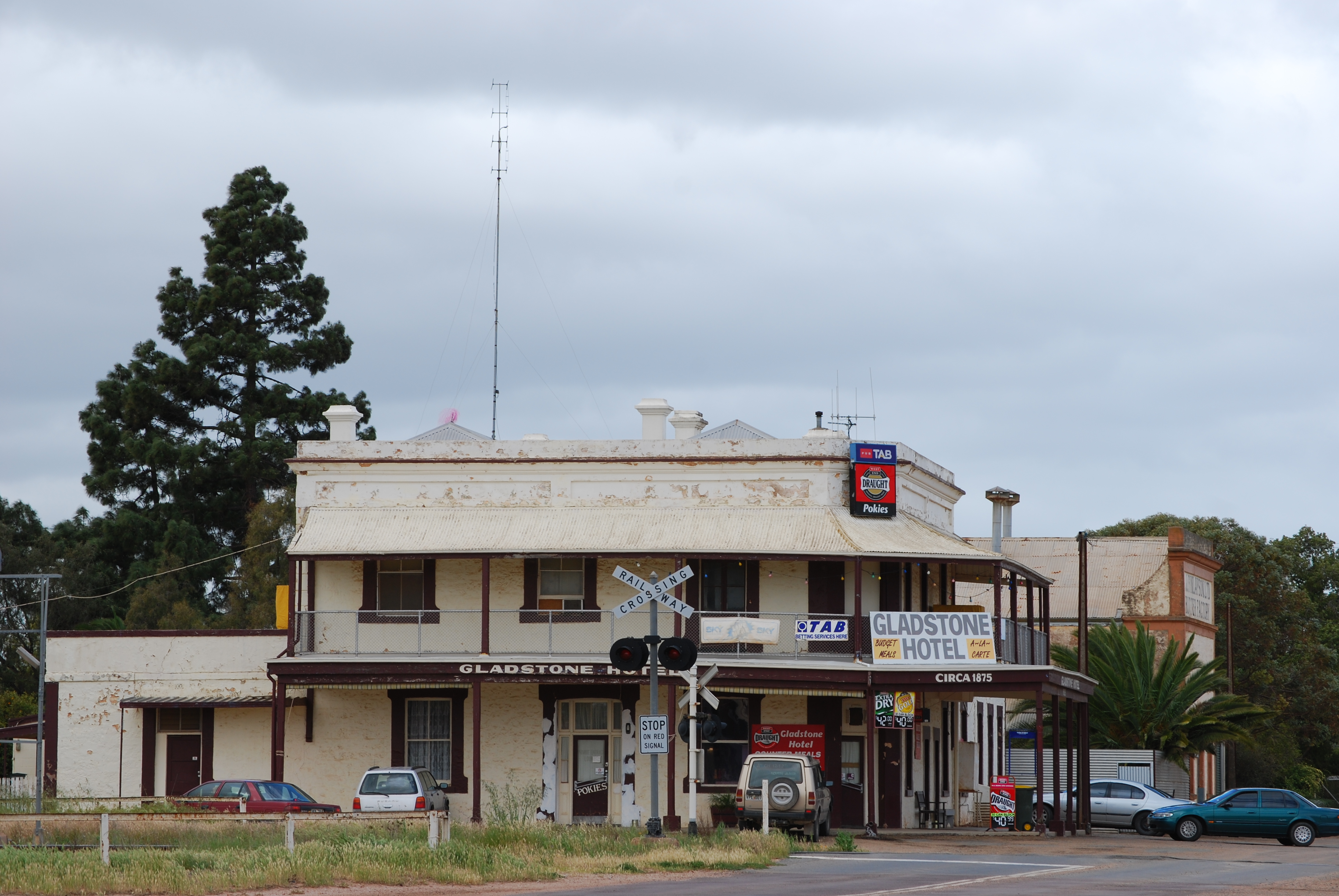
- Gladstone Hotel

- Coordinates: 33°16′S 138°21′E
- Country: Australia
- State: South Australia
- LGA: Northern Areas Council
- Location: 211 km (131 mi) N of Adelaide; 38 km (24 mi) E of Port Pirie

Government
  - State electorate: Stuart
  - Federal division: Division of Grey
- Elevation: 43 m (141 ft)

Population
  - Total: 623 (UCL 2021)
- Postcode: 5473
Localities around Gladstone
Beetaloo Valley	Laura; Caltowie West	Caltowie
	Gladstone	West Bundaleer
Huddleston	Georgetown

Gladstone (including the former town of Booyoolie) is a small rural town in the Mid North of South Australia in the approach to the lower Flinders Ranges. At the 2006 census, Gladstone had a population of 629.

The town services the surrounding district with two pubs, three churches, a bank, post office and several shops and small businesses providing basic goods and services. The closest hospital is 11 km away in a neighbouring rural town, but doctors take appointments in the town's medical clinic. There is a kindergarten (approximately 12 enrollments), state primary school (63), Catholic primary school (60) and a secondary school (approximately 205 students, drawn from the wider district).

Gladstone has sporting/social clubs providing for Aussie Rules football, netball, cricket, tennis, golf, lawn bowls, swimming (at the local outdoor pool) and soccer (newly formed for school-aged children), all seasonal. Sporting competitions occur between clubs from the neighbouring towns within a radius of about 75 km.

Wheat and sheep are the main farming produce of the region, but Gladstone has the largest inland grain storage facility in the Southern Hemisphere, storing wheat, barley, durum wheat, peas, faba beans and fiesta beans.

The Anglican Diocese of Willochra is based in Gladstone, with the Registry (the Diocesan Office) housed in building in the main street. In addition the Bishop of Willochra lives in Bishop's House which is on the Main North Road.

Gladstone was the home of Trend Drinks, a local soft drink manufacturer, from its founding in 1876 until it moved to Corowa, New South Wales in 2016.

== History ==
The town of Gladstone was privately laid out by Matthew Moorhouse east of the railway line in October 1872 on Section 31, Hundred of Yangya. A government town named Booyoolie was laid out in March 1875 on the western side of the railway line in the Hundred of Booyoolie. In 1940, Booyoolie was renamed Gladstone to match the private town and railway station. The name Gladstone is derived from William Ewart Gladstone, a Prime Minister of the United Kingdom.

During World War II, the RAAF No. 28 Inland Aircraft Fuel Depot was established near Gladstone. It consisted of large tanks concealed under earthen mounds. The Gladstone depot was one of 31 fuel depots established across Australia in places that were remote from airfields and immune to naval attack.

Historical population
Year	Pop.	±%
1921	891	—
1933	940	+5.5%
1947		—
1954		—
1961	1,063	—
1966	1,053	−0.9%
1971	927	−12.0%
1976	802	−13.5%
1981	680	−15.2%
1986	698	+2.6%
1991	643	−7.9%
1996	660	+2.6%
2001	624	−5.5%
2006	629	+0.8%
2011	610	−3.0%
2016	629	+3.1%
2021	623	−1.0%
Source: Australian Bureau of Statistics data.

== Heritage listings ==
Gladstone has a number of heritage-listed sites, including:

- 42 Gladstone Street: National Australia Bank Building
- 44 Gladstone Terrace: Savings Bank of South Australia Building
- Ward Street: Gladstone Gaol

== Railways ==
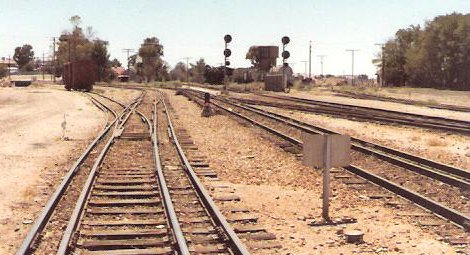
Gladstone Railyard March 1986 showing all three rail gauges in use on the one track bed.

Gladstone is located on the main Crystal Brook-Broken Hill railway line, with branches going north and south.

Originally, all the lines were 3 ft 6 in (1,067 mm) gauge narrow gauge railways, starting with the line from Port Pirie in 1875, extended to Petersburg (now Peterborough) in 1880 and to Cockburn (on the state border near Broken Hill) in 1888. A branch from Gladstone to Laura in 1884 was extended to Wilmington in 1915. The line from the south (extending the line that terminated at Blyth) was completed in 1894. In 1927, the line from Hamley Bridge through Blythe to Gladstone was converted to 5 ft 3 in (1,600 mm) broad gauge, making Gladstone a break-of-gauge junction.

In 1970, the line from Port Pirie to Broken Hill was converted to 4 ft 8 1/2 in (1,435 mm) standard gauge making Gladstone into a rare three-gauge break-of-gauge junction as the Wilmington railway line to the north remained an isolated narrow gauge line. In the 1980s, the broad and narrow gauge lines were closed, leaving Gladstone as a purely standard gauge station.

Journey Beyond's weekly Indian Pacific experiential train service passes Gladstone on its route but it does not stop at the station.
