= Huddleston, South Australia =

Huddleston South Australia
- Coordinates: 33°20′40″S 138°16′54″E
- Population: 23 (2021)
- Postcode(s): 5523
- LGA(s): Port Pirie Regional Council
- State electorate(s): Stuart
- Federal division(s): Grey

Huddleston is a locality in the Port Pirie Regional Council in the Mid North region of South Australia, Australia.

== Demographics ==
As of the 2021 Australian census, 23 people resided in Huddleston, up from 16 in the 2016 census. The median age of persons in Huddleston was 51 years. There were fewer males than females, with 47.6% of the population male and 52.4% female. The average household size was 2.5 people per household.
