= Hamley Bridge–Gladstone railway line =

Former railway line in South Australia

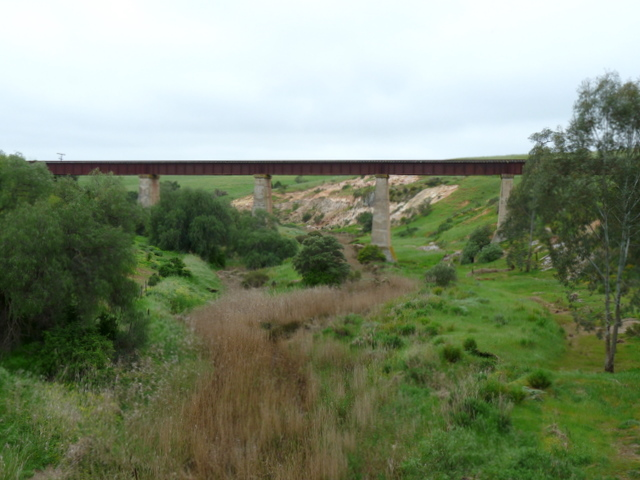
- The railway bridge over the Gilbert River at Hamley Bridge, (October 2010)

Overview
- Status: Partially closed and removed, remaining section dormant
- Termini: Hamley Bridge; Gladstone
- Continues from: Roseworthy-Peterborough line
- Continues as: Wilmington line

Service
- System: South Australian Railways
- Operator(s): South Australian Railways; Australian National

History
- Opened: Hamley Bridge-Balaklava: 15 January 1880; Balaklava-Blyth: 14 March 1876; Blyth to Gladstone: 2 July 1894
- Closed: Gulnare-Gladstone: 11 May 1988; Balaklava-Gulnare: 29 March 1989; Balaklava-Hamley Bridge: 1 March 2005

Technical
- Line length: 147.7 km (91.8 mi)
- Track gauge: 1,600 mm (5 ft 3 in)
- Old gauge: 1,067 mm (3 ft 6 in)

The Hamley Bridge–Gladstone railway line was a railway line on the South Australian Railways network. It extended from a junction at Hamley Bridge on the Roseworthy-Peterborough line (which provided connection through to Adelaide) through Balaklava and Brinkworth to Gladstone.

== History ==
The earliest part of the narrow gauge Hamley Bridge-Gladstone line opened from Balaklava to Blyth on 14 March 1876 as part of the Port Wakefield line. On 15 January 1880, the line opened from Hamley Bridge to Balaklava. It was extended north from Blyth to Gladstone on 2 July 1894 where it joined the Port Pirie-Cockburn and Wilmington lines. As Balaklava railway station was originally on the Port Wakefield to Blyth line, before the railway from Hamley Bridge was built, and the new line entered the town from the south-east, trains using the route between Gladstone and Adelaide needed to change direction at Balaklava, as both the north and south lines entered the station from the east, with Port Wakefield being to the west.

The "Western System" included the railway from Hamley Bridge to Gladstone, along with the lines from Balaklava through Port Wakefield, Kadina and Wallaroo, and the line from Kadina through Snowtown to Brinkworth. All of these lines were prepared for conversion from narrow to broad gauge in the mid-1920s, with the switch made on 1 August 1927. The lines were gauge converted to 5 ft 3 in (1,600 mm) on 1 August 1927.

In March 1978, the line was included in the transfer of the South Australian Railways to Australian National. Regular passengers services ceased in November 1982 with the Gulnare to Gladstone section being closed on 11 May 1988, followed by the Balaklava to Gulnare section on 29 March 1989. The section of track between Balaklava and Gladstone was removed in late 1989.

On 1 November 1997, Australian Southern Railroad acquired a 50-year lease on the rail corridor and total ownership of the rail infrastructure as part of Australian National's South Australian freight assets sale to ASR. The last passenger train operated on the line in November 1999, an RTA charter using Bluebird railcars. The last train ran on the line on 1 March 2005, when locomotives 843 - 841 left Balaklava. The lease of the land and ownership of the rail infrastructure passed to Aurizon in 2022, following their purchase of One Rail Australia (the final successor of Australian Southern Railroad).

In April 2017, the 10 km section between Halbury and Balaklava was converted into the Shamus Liptrot Cycling Trail. It was developed in memory of Shamus Liptrot, a local cyclist who died in 2011 after suffering injuries from a cycling accident

Aurizon does not list the line as being open or in use, but it is available for access. The line has fallen into disrepair, being severed at several points for drainage and road surface improvements. In 2022, the line was blocked off from the Gawler line, and the wider Adelaide metropolitan network after a fence was installed at the Gawler River bridge.
