= Nundroo, South Australia =

Nundroo
- Town
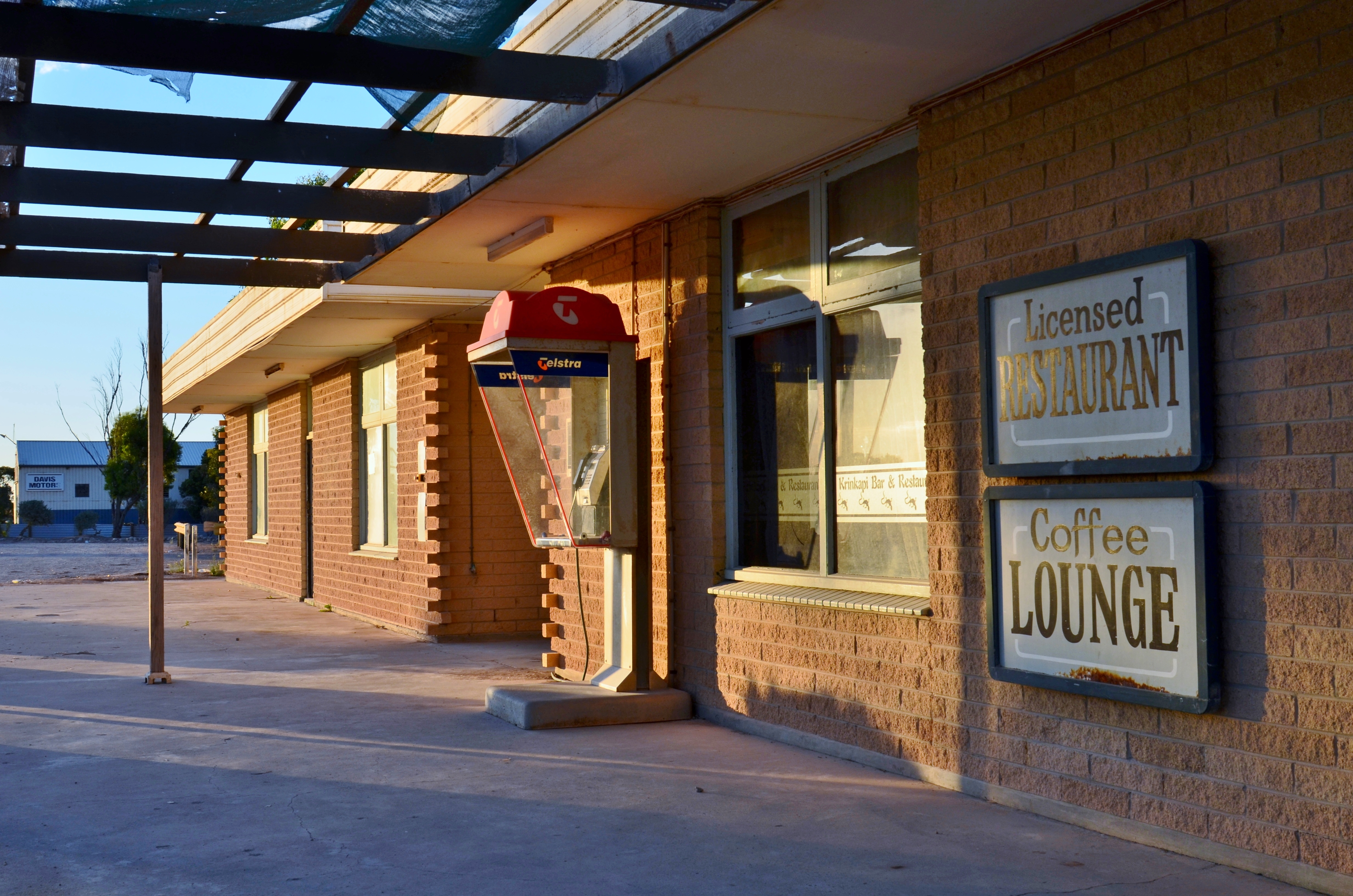
- The Nundroo Roadhouse, 2017

- Coordinates: 31°47′9″S 132°12′54″E
- Country: Australia
- State: South Australia
- Region: Eyre and Western
- LGA: Pastoral Unincorporated Area
- Location: 1,014 km (630 mi) NW of Adelaide city centre; 142 km (88 mi) W of Ceduna; 347 km (216 mi) E of Western Australia border

Government
  - State electorate: Flinders
  - Federal division: Grey
- Time zone: UTC+9:30 (ACST)
  - Summer (DST): UTC+10:30 (ACST)
- Postcode: 5690

Nundroo is a small South Australian town, located approximately 1,014 kilometres (630 mi) west of Adelaide. It is a popular rest stop for travellers due to its location on the Eyre Highway.

The area was settled by sheep graziers in the 1860s. By the 1870s the Nundroo sheep station had been incorporated in the larger Yalata and Fowlers Bay sheep runs. In the following decade these vast runs were broken up as the original pastoral leases expired, opening the area up to such activities as grain farming.

As an agriculture based town, its industries include sheep production and grain growing farming. Nundroo has its motel, Nundroo Hotel Motel opened in 1957 and a roadhouse, the Nundroo Roadhouse, used a transient stop to Eucla and other nearby towns Coorabie, Bookabie, Fowlers Bay, Koonibba and the major town of Ceduna.

== See also ==
- List of cities and towns in South Australia
