= Hundred of Nash =

Nash
- Cadastral division
- Coordinates: 31.847°S 132.540°E
- Country: Australia
- State: South Australia
- Established: 23 October 1890

Area
  - Total: 230 km^{2} (88 sq mi)
- County: Kintore
Lands administrative divisions around Nash
May	Pastoral unincorporated	Pastoral unincorporated
Caldwell	Nash	Magarey
Great Australian Bight	Great Australian Bight	Great Australian Bight

The Hundred of Nash is a cadastral hundred in the County of Kintore, South Australia on the southeastern fringe of the Nullarbor Plain spanning Fowler's Bay. The hundred was proclaimed in 1890 by Governor Kintore and named for a contemporary member of the state parliament, Benjamin Nash.

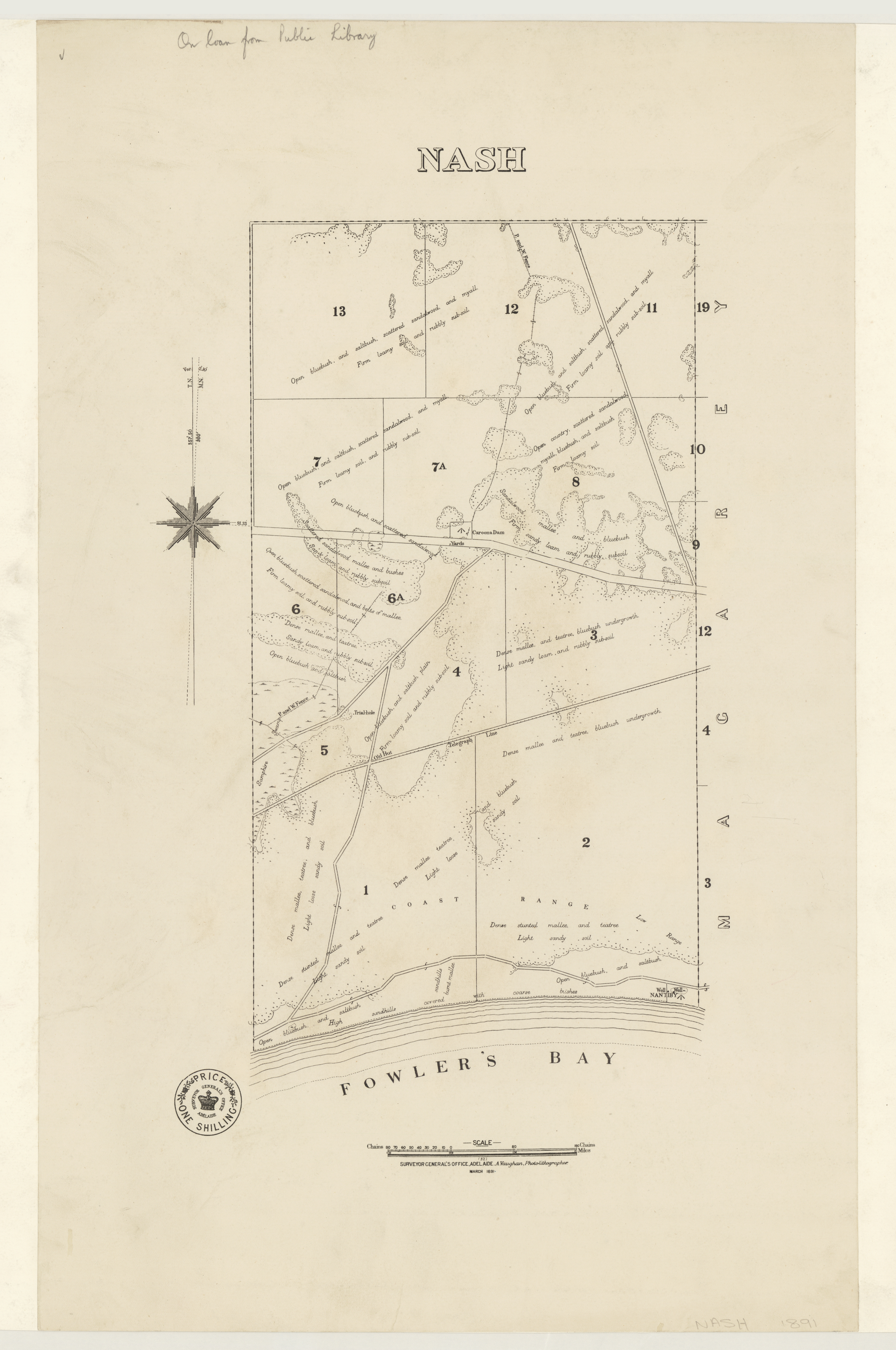
Plan of the Hundred of Nash, 1891

The land in the hundred is very sparsely populated. As such the hundred has never been subject to dedicated local government and the local community receive municipal services are provided by the Outback Communities Authority. Nash and its neighbouring hundred, Magarey, are within the bounded locality of Bookabie.
