= County of Manchester =

Manchester
- Cadastral division
- Coordinates: 32°31′54″S 137°27′37″E
- Country: Australia
- State: South Australia
- Region: Far North; Eyre Western
- LGA: City of Port Augusta (part) City of Whyalla (part) Pastoral Unincorporated Area
- Established: 1891

Area
  - Total: 5,000 km^{2} (1,930 sq mi)
Lands administrative divisions around Manchester
		Newcastle
Hore-Ruthven	Manchester	Newcastle; Spencer Gulf
York	York	Spencer Gulf
- Coordinates; Adjoining counties

County of Manchester is a cadastral unit located in the Australian state of South Australia that covers land both located in the north-east of Eyre Peninsula and to the peninsula's north. It was proclaimed in 1891 and named after George Montagu, 6th Duke of Manchester who was the father-in-law of the Earl of Kintore GCMG, the Governor of South Australia at the time.

== Description ==
The County of Manchester covers a part of South Australia associated in part with the east coast of Eyre Peninsula overlooking Spencer Gulf and in the part with land to the immediate north and which extends inland from the coastline for a distance of about 56 kilometres (35 mi). The southern part of its extent is within Eyre Peninsula because the peninsula's northern boundary passes through the county in an east–west direction. It is bounded to the west by the County of Hore-Ruthven, to the south by the County of York and to the east by the County of Newcastle and Spencer Gulf.

Settlements include Iron Knob which is located on the western side of the county, and the following suburbs and localities located on the coastline with Spencer Gulf (from north to south) - Port Augusta West which is the part of the Port Augusta urban area, Commissariat Point, Blanche Harbor, Douglas Point and Douglas Point South.

The county is served by the following roads which extend from Port Augusta - Stuart Highway which passes through the county to the north, the Eyre Highway which passes to the west and the Lincoln Highway which passes to the south, and in part by the Iron Knob Road which runs between Iron Knob and Whyalla which is located to the south of the county.

The following railway lines pass through the county - the Trans-Australian Railway which travels to the north en route to Perth, the Whyalla railway line which travels south to its terminus at Whyalla, and part of the railway line which operates between Iron Knob and Whyalla.

Land use within the county includes primary industrial activity such as grazing and mining, and a military training area known as the Cultana Training Area.

Its extent includes parts of the local government areas of Port Augusta and Whyalla and land within the state's Pastoral Unincorporated Area, and parts of the following state government regions - Eyre Western and the Far North.

== History ==
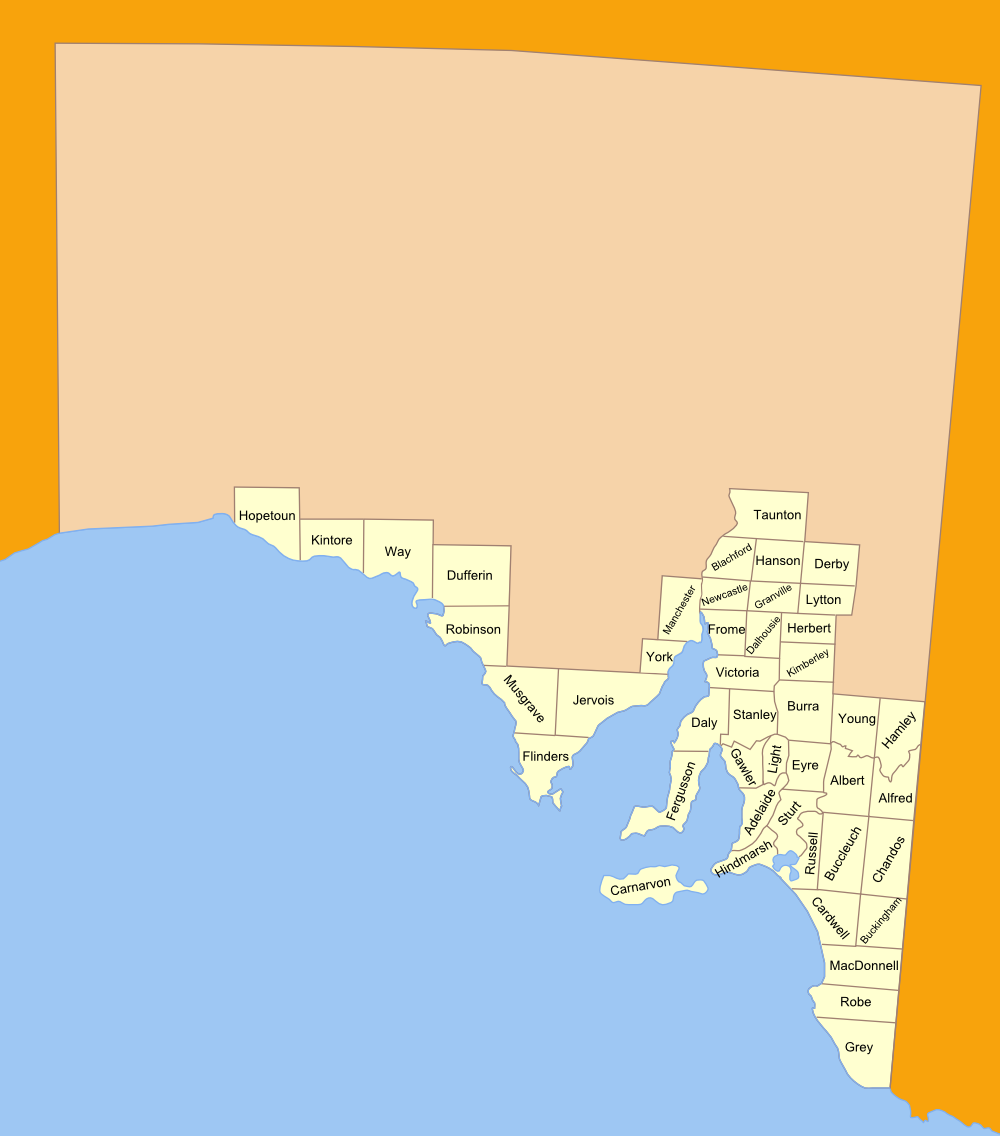
South Australian counties as of 1893 including Manchester

The County of Manchester was proclaimed on 21 May 1891 along with the hundreds of Castine, Copley and Handyside.

The county was named by Algernon Keith-Falconer, 9th Earl of Kintore, the Governor of South Australia after his father-in-law, George Montagu, 6th Duke of Manchester.

The following hundreds have been proclaimed within the county - Castine, Copley and Handyside in 1891, Jenkins in 1892 and Gillen in 1893.

== Constituent hundreds ==
=== Location of constituent hundreds ===
The hundreds are laid out from north to south along the county's eastern boundary as follows - Castine, Copley, Gillen and Jenkins with the latter being bounded by the County of York to the south. The Hundred of Handyside is located on the west side of Copley and Gillen.

=== Hundred of Castine ===
The Hundred of Castine (32°17′20″S 137°39′07″E) was proclaimed on 21 May 1891. It covers an area of 250 square kilometres (95 mi^{2}) and is named after John Castine, a member of the Parliament of South Australia. Its extent includes parts of the localities of Carriewerlow and Mount Arden.

=== Hundred of Copley ===
The Hundred of Copley (32°25′56″S 137°41′16″E) was proclaimed on 21 May 1891. It covers an area of 230 square kilometres (90 mi^{2}) and is named after William Copley, a former member of the South Australian Parliament. Its extent includes parts of the localities of Carriewerlow, Mount Arden, Lincoln Gap and Port Augusta West.

=== Hundred of Gillen ===
The Hundred of Gillen (32°35′44″S 137°41′41″E) was proclaimed on 26 January 1893. It covers an area of 250 square kilometres (95 mi^{2}) and is named after P P Gillen, a former member of the South Australian Parliament. Its extent includes the locality of Commissariat Point and parts of the localities of Cultana, Lincoln Gap and Port Augusta West.

=== Hundred of Handyside ===
The Hundred of Handyside (32°34′00″S 137°31′34″E) was proclaimed on 21 May 1891. It covers an area of 350 square kilometres (134 mi^{2}) and is named after A D Handyside, a former member of the South Australian Parliament. Its extent includes parts of the localities of Carriewerlow, Cultana, Illeroo, Lincoln Gap and Pandurra.

=== Hundred of Jenkins ===
The Hundred of Jenkins (32°46′46″S 137°41′46″E) was proclaimed on 28 January 1892. It covers an area of 400 square kilometres (154 mi^{2}) and is named after John Jenkins, a former member of the South Australian Parliament. Its extent includes the localities of Blanche Harbor and Douglas Point, and parts of the localities of Cultana and Douglas Point South.

== See also ==
- Lands administrative divisions of South Australia
