= Hundred of Giles =

Giles
- Cadastral division
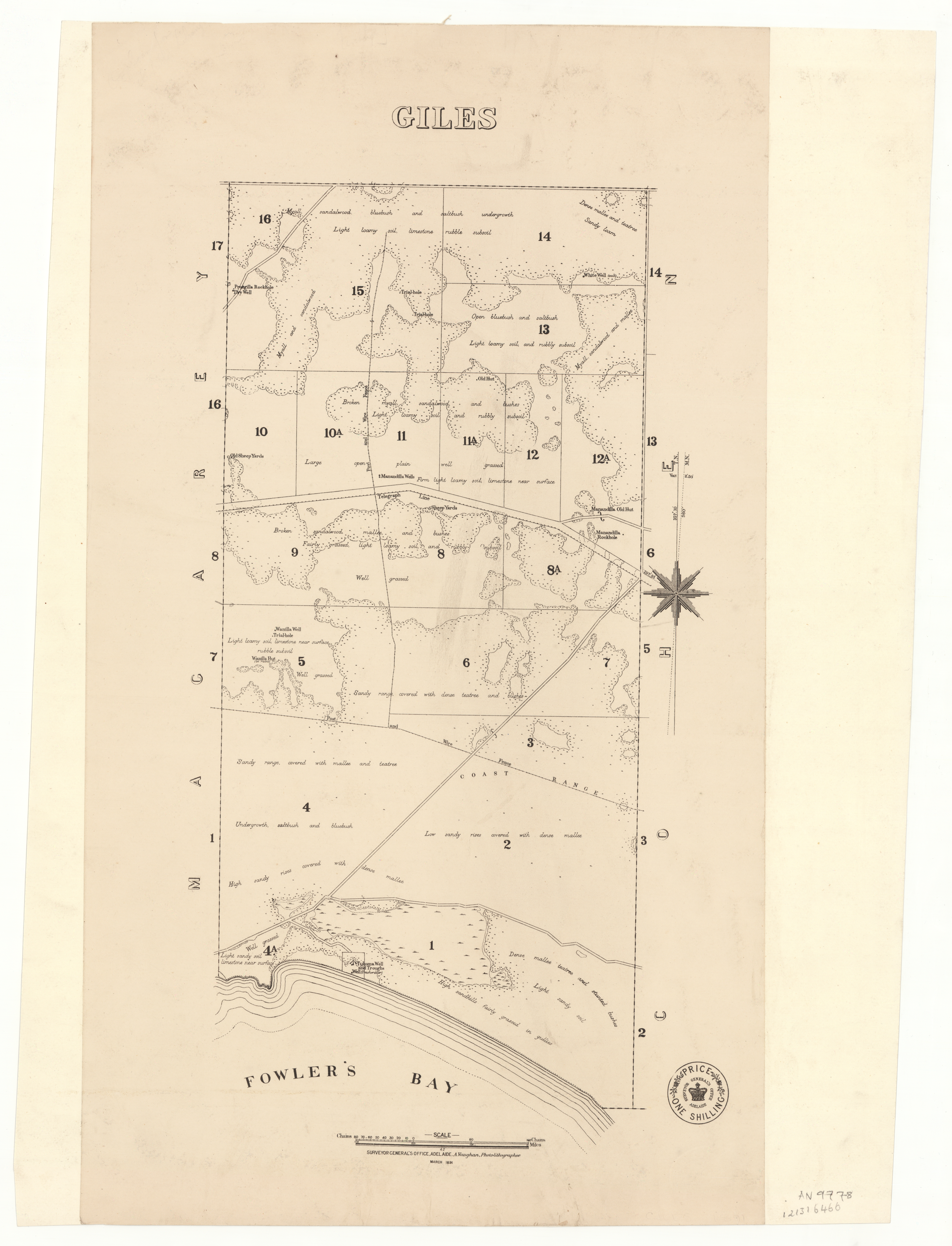
- Plan of the Hundred of Giles, 1891

- Coordinates: 31.857°S 132.783°E
- Country: Australia
- State: South Australia
- Established: 23 October 1890

Area
  - Total: 270 km^{2} (104 sq mi)
- County: Kintore
Lands administrative divisions around Giles
Pastoral unincorporated	Pastoral unincorporated	Pastoral unincorporated
Magarey	Giles	Cohen
Great Australian Bight	Great Australian Bight	Kevin

The Hundred of Giles is a cadastral hundred (administrative division) in the County of Kintore, South Australia on the southeastern fringe of the Nullarbor Plain. The hundred was proclaimed in 1890 by Governor Kintore and named for a contemporary member of the state parliament, Clement Giles.

The land in the hundred is very sparsely populated. As such the hundred has never been subject to dedicated local government and is instead locally administered by the Outback Communities Authority. Giles and its neighbouring hundred, Magarey, are within the bounded locality of Bookabie. A portion of the Chadinga Conservation Park is within the Hundred of Giles. Eyre Bluff (alternatively known as Point Eyre, Cap Lebrun or Cap Van-Spaendonck) is the only major geographic feature along the southern coastline within the hundred.
