= Lands administrative divisions of South Australia =

Administrative divisions of South Australia

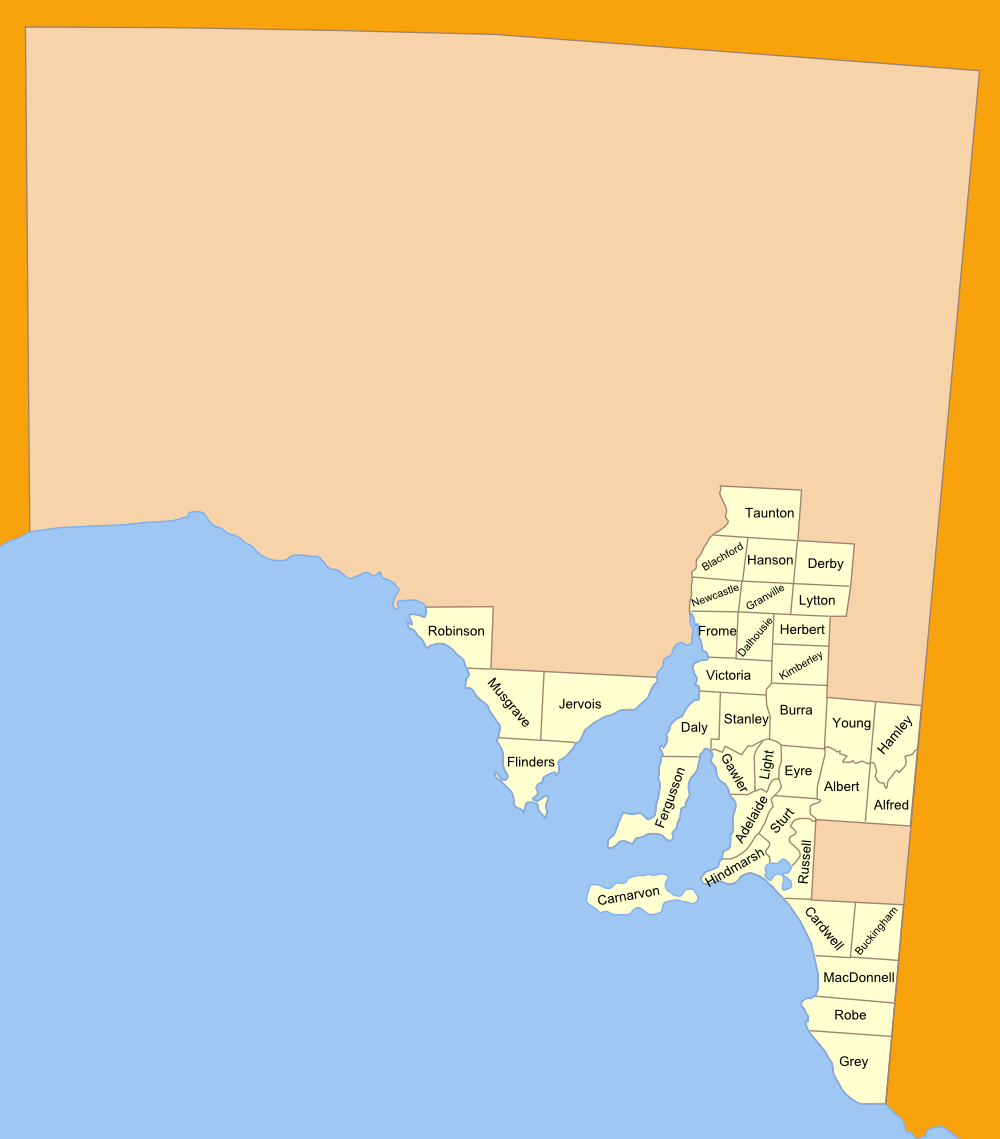
The 37 counties of South Australia in 1886; 12 more were later proclaimed

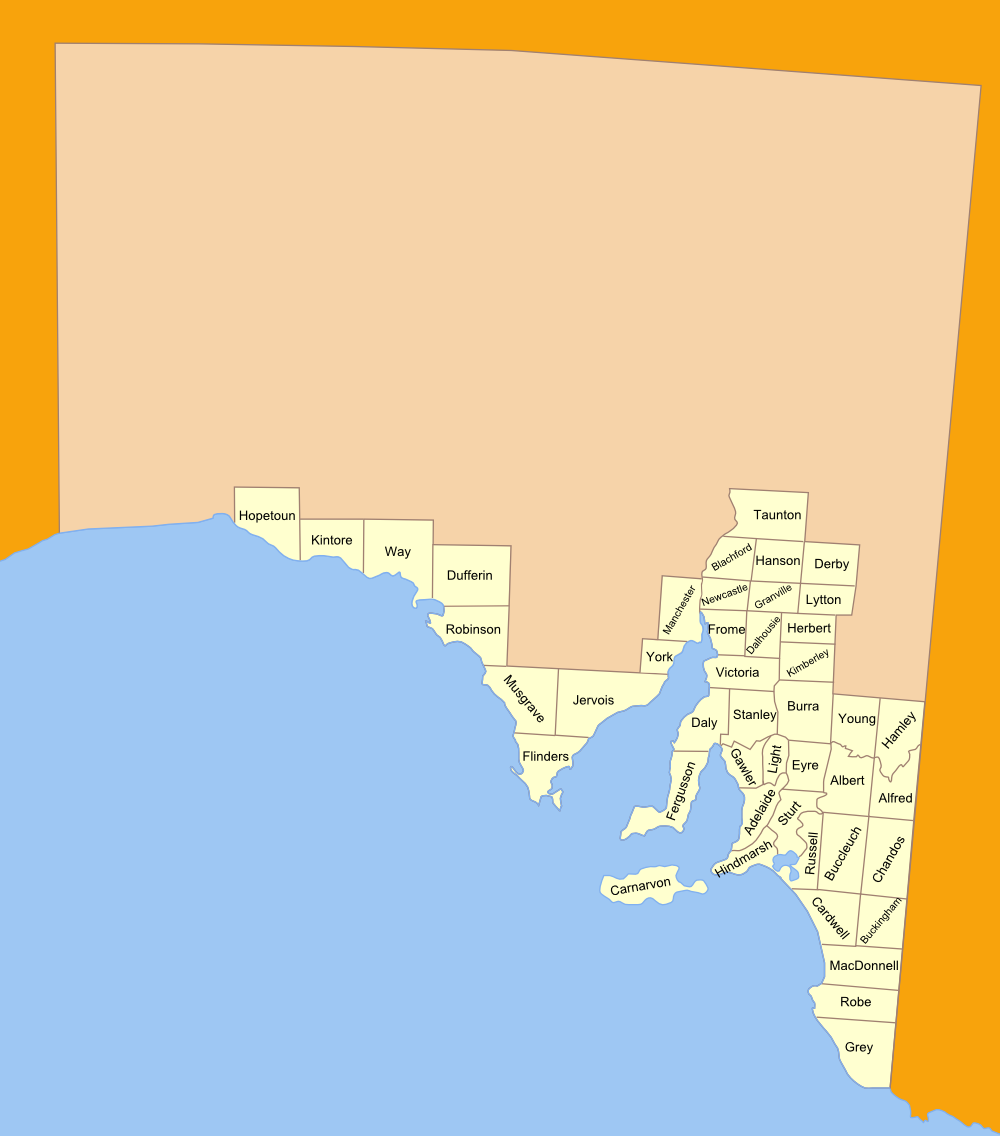
The 45 counties of South Australia in 1893; 4 more would later be proclaimed

The lands administrative divisions of South Australia are the cadastral (i.e., comprehensively surveyed and mapped) units of counties and hundreds in South Australia. They are located only in the south-eastern part of the state, and do not cover the whole state. 49 counties have been proclaimed across the southern and southeastern areas of the state historically considered to be arable and thus in need of a cadastre. Within that area, a total of 540 hundreds have been proclaimed, although five were annulled in 1870, and, in some cases, the names reused elsewhere.

All South Australian hundreds have unique names, making it unnecessary, when referring to a hundred, to also name its county (as is done in some land administration systems such as that of New South Wales).

With the exception of the historic Hundred of Murray (1853–1870), which occupied parts of five counties, all hundreds have been defined as a subset of a single county.

The hundreds of South Australia formed the basis for the establishment boundaries of most of the earliest local government bodies (that is, district councils). By the 1930s most of the settled hundreds in the state had their own district councils. In the case of heavily settled lands, like the hundreds of Adelaide and Yatala, multiple town and city councils shared the governance of a single hundred. In the case of sparsely populated rural lands, adjacent hundreds were represented by a single district council. In every case, the hundred boundaries largely shaped the initial boundaries of such district councils, as seen with the large-scale expansion of South Australian local government in the District Councils Act 1887.

== Land division history ==
In the early days of European settlement in South Australia, land was released in the colony for farming in an orderly manner by the government. Initial land sales were made as a prerequisite to the founding of the colony, with "preliminary land orders" being made to a total value of £35,000 prior to the 1837 settlement. A preliminary land order entitled the buyer to a 1-acre (4,000 m^{2}) town block and an 80-acre (32 ha) section of rural land which was to be chosen by the individual following the earliest land survey after settlement. The initial town survey of Adelaide was completed in March 1837. By February 1839 the surrounding country from coast to foothills, as far south as O'Halloran Hill and north to present-day Grand Junction Road, had been surveyed into country sections, with between a quarter and a half having already been claimed by the early investors or purchased by early settlers.

The country sections delineated in the early land surveys generally formed the hundred sections when the first hundreds were proclaimed in 1846 (in the counties of Adelaide and Hindmarsh). From this time, the government surveyor systematically established new areas to be released by creating the boundaries of a county, and then dividing that into hundreds of approximately the same size. Outside the initial survey area centred on Adelaide, hundreds were surveyed into sections of varying sizes with the intention that the section would support a single viable farm. These sections were available for purchase soon after a hundred was surveyed and proclaimed. Most hundreds had a town near the middle, and smaller sections closer to the township. Contemporary definitions of rural real estate in South Australia still typically includes the section number(s) and hundred name.

A total of 540 hundreds were proclaimed in the state from 1846 to 1971, but only 535 exist today, following the discontinuation of the hundreds of Murray, Cooper, Randell, Giles and Morphett alongside the Murray River in 1870. A total of 561 names of hundreds are listed in the South Australian official gazetteer Placenames Online, with the 21 extra names unused today due to either renaming or failure to adopt proposed names.

=== Removal of German-origin names ===
In 1916, during the First World War, ten hundreds with names of German origin (Basedow, Homburg, Krichauff, North Rhine, Paech, Pflaum, Scherk, Schomburgk, South Rhine, Von Doussa) were proposed for renaming with Aboriginal names, but this only occurred for the hundreds of Paech and Pflaum, which became the hundreds of Cannawigara and Geegeela respectively. The remaining eight hundreds were renamed in 1918 with names derived from Allied commanders or battles. The hundreds of Basedow, Homburg, Krichauff, North Rhine, Scherk, Schomburgk, South Rhine and Von Doussa became, respectively, the hundreds of French, Haig, Beatty, Jellicoe, Sturdee, Maude, Jutland and Allenby.

== List of counties ==
County	Proclaimed	Number of Hundreds
County of Adelaide	1842	11
County of Albert	1860	13 (Note: Four of the hundreds in the County of Albert (Cooper, Randell, Giles and Morphett) were annulled in 1870 in conjunction with the annulment of the Hundred of Murray.) (Note: The Hundred of Murray (proclaimed in 1853) which occupied parts of seven counties (Russell, Sturt, Albert, Eyre, Young, Hamley and Alfred), to follow the Murray River, was annulled in 1870. The numbers in the table do not include this hundred.)
County of Alfred	1869	8
County of Blachford	1877	5
County of Bosanquet	1913	1
County of Buccleuch	1893	17
County of Buckingham	1869	11
County of Burra	1851	13
County of Buxton	1896	13
County of Cardwell	1864	12
County of Carnarvon	1874	12
County of Chandos	1893	12
County of Dalhousie	1871	12
County of Daly	1862	13
County of Derby	1877	0
County of Dufferin	1889	11
County of Eyre	1842	13
County of Fergusson	1869	16
County of Flinders	1842	15
County of Frome	1851	14
County of Gawler	1842	8
County of Granville	1876	7
County of Grey	1846	21
County of Hamley	1869	2
County of Hanson	1877	5
County of Herbert	1877	6
County of Hindmarsh	1842	11
County of Hopetoun	1892	9
County of Hore-Ruthven	1933	0
County of Jervois	1878	34
County of Kimberley	1871	6
County of Kintore	1890	8
County of Le Hunte	1908	17
County of Light	1842	9
County of Lytton	1877	0
County of MacDonnell	1857	15
County of Manchester	1891	5
County of Musgrave	1876	20
County of Newcastle	1876	9
County of Robe	1846	18
County of Robinson	1883	24 (Note: In addition to the 24 proclaimed hundreds in the County of Robinson, the Hundred of McBeath was also proclaimed but apparently never gazetted.)
County of Russell	1842	9
County of Stanley	1842	16
County of Sturt	1842	10
County of Taunton	1877	6
County of Victoria	1857	14
County of Way	1889	13
County of York	1895	7
County of Young	1860	4

== List of hundreds ==
Hundred	Proclaimed	County	Notes
Hundred of the Murray	1853–1870	(initially parts of 3 counties)	Obsolete; initially occupied parts of counties of Sturt, Russell and Eyre along banks of River Murray, Lake Alexandrina and Lake Albert
Hundred of Adelaide	1846	Adelaide	
Hundred of Barossa	1846	Adelaide	
Hundred of Kuitpo	1846	Adelaide	
Hundred of Munno Para	1846	Adelaide	
Hundred of Noarlunga	1846	Adelaide	
Hundred of Onkaparinga	1846	Adelaide	
Hundred of Para Wirra	1846	Adelaide	
Hundred of Port Adelaide	1846	Adelaide	
Hundred of Talunga	1846	Adelaide	
Hundred of Willunga	1846	Adelaide	
Hundred of Yatala	1846	Adelaide	
Hundred of Bakara	1893	Albert	
Hundred of Bandon	1898	Albert	
Hundred of Cadell	1860	Albert	
Hundred of Chesson	1912	Albert	
Hundred of Forster	1883	Albert	
Hundred of Holder	1893	Albert	
Hundred of Mantung	1893	Albert	
Hundred of Mindarie	1912	Albert	
Hundred of Moorook	1893	Albert	
Hundred of Murbko	1893	Albert	
Hundred of Nildottie	1878	Albert	
Hundred of Paisley	1860	Albert	
Hundred of Waikerie	1893	Albert	
Hundred of Cooper	1860–1870	Albert	Obsolete. Between hundred of Paisley and River Murray. Now Hundred of Nildottie.
Hundred of Randell	1860–1870	Albert	Obsolete. Between hundreds of Cadell and Hay. Now Hundred of Murbko.
Hundred of Giles	1860–1870	Albert	Obsolete. Between hundreds of Cooper and Ridley, and River Murray. Now Hundred of Forster.
Hundred of Morphett	1860–1870	Albert	Obsolete. Between hundreds of Giles and Ridley, and River Murray. Now Hundred of Bowhill and part of Hundred of Forster.
Hundred of Allen	1912	Alfred	
Hundred of Bookpurnong	1893	Alfred	
Hundred of Gordon	1893	Alfred	
Hundred of Kekwick	1912	Alfred	
Hundred of McGorrery	1912	Alfred	
Hundred of Murtho	1893	Alfred	
Hundred of Paringa	1893	Alfred	
Hundred of Pyap	1893	Alfred	
Hundred of Barndioota	1881	Blachford	
Hundred of Cotabena	1888	Blachford	
Hundred of Warrakimbo	1888	Blachford	
Hundred of Wonoka	1877	Blachford	
Hundred of Woolyana	1880	Blachford	
Hundred of Pildappa	1913	Bosanquet	
Hundred of Bowhill	1893	Buccleuch	
Hundred of Carcuma	1929	Buccleuch	
Hundred of Coneybeer	1895	Buccleuch	
Hundred of Hooper	1899	Buccleuch	
Hundred of Kirkpatrick	1906	Buccleuch	
Hundred of Lewis	1902	Buccleuch	
Hundred of Livingston	1902	Buccleuch	
Hundred of Marmon Jabuk	1910	Buccleuch	
Hundred of McPherson	1910	Buccleuch	
Hundred of Molineux	1911	Buccleuch	
Hundred of Peake	1906	Buccleuch	
Hundred of Price	1906	Buccleuch	
Hundred of Roby	1899	Buccleuch	
Hundred of Sherlock	1899	Buccleuch	
Hundred of Strawbridge	1901	Buccleuch	
Hundred of Vincent	1898	Buccleuch	
Hundred of Wilson	1910	Buccleuch	
Hundred of Archibald	1906	Buckingham	
Hundred of Cannawigara	1909	Buckingham	Renamed from Hundred of Paech in 1918
Hundred of Makin	1939	Buckingham	
Hundred of McCallum	1939	Buckingham	
Hundred of Pendleton	1909	Buckingham	
Hundred of Senior	1906	Buckingham	
Hundred of Shaugh	1939	Buckingham	
Hundred of Stirling	1886	Buckingham	
Hundred of Tatiara	1871	Buckingham	
Hundred of Willalooka	1921	Buckingham	
Hundred of Wirrega	1882	Buckingham	
Hundred of Paech	1909-1918	Buckingham	Renamed Hundred of Cannawigara in 1918
Hundred of Apoinga	1851	Burra	
Hundred of Baldina	1875	Burra	
Hundred of Bright	1875	Burra	
Hundred of Bundey	1878	Burra	
Hundred of Hallett	1860	Burra	
Hundred of King	1878	Burra	
Hundred of Kingston	1860	Burra	
Hundred of Kooringa	1851	Burra	
Hundred of Lindley	1881	Burra	
Hundred of Maude	1880	Burra	Renamed from Hundred of Schomburgk in 1918
Hundred of Mongolata	1875	Burra	
Hundred of Rees	1879	Burra	
Hundred of Tomkinson	1879	Burra	
Hundred of Schomburgk	1880-1918	Burra	Renamed Hundred of Maude in 1918
Hundred of Koerabko	n/a	Burra	1916 proposed renaming of Hundred of Schomburgk; rejected in 1918 for "Hundred of Maude".
Hundred of Barna	1917	Buxton	
Hundred of Buckleboo	1922	Buxton	
Hundred of Caralue	1917	Buxton	
Hundred of Cortlinye	1914	Buxton	
Hundred of Cunyarie	1922	Buxton	
Hundred of Kelly	1896	Buxton	
Hundred of Moseley	1914	Buxton	
Hundred of O'Connor	1925	Buxton	
Hundred of Panitya	1928	Buxton	
Hundred of Pinkawillinie	1922	Buxton	
Hundred of Solomon	1909	Buxton	
Hundred of Wilcherry	1924	Buxton	
Hundred of Yalanda	1917	Buxton	
Hundred of Colebatch	1938	Cardwell	
Hundred of Coombe	1906	Cardwell	
Hundred of Field	1938	Cardwell	
Hundred of Glyde	1864	Cardwell	
Hundred of Laffer	1921	Cardwell	
Hundred of McNamara	1938	Cardwell	
Hundred of Messent	1938	Cardwell	
Hundred of Neville	1864	Cardwell	
Hundred of Petherick	1938	Cardwell	
Hundred of Richards	1938	Cardwell	
Hundred of Santo	1864	Cardwell	
Hundred of Wells	1938	Cardwell	
Hundred of Borda	1960	Carnarvon	
Hundred of Cassini	1884	Carnarvon	
Hundred of Dudley	1874	Carnarvon	
Hundred of Duncan	1909	Carnarvon	
Hundred of Gosse	1931	Carnarvon	
Hundred of Haines	1883	Carnarvon	
Hundred of MacGillivray	1906	Carnarvon	
Hundred of McDonald	1910	Carnarvon	
Hundred of Menzies	1878	Carnarvon	
Hundred of Newland	1909	Carnarvon	
Hundred of Ritchie	1909	Carnarvon	
Hundred of Seddon	1908	Carnarvon	
Hundred of Baudin	n/a	Carnarvon	Proposed name for a hundred on Kangaroo Island. Never used.
Hundred of Allenby	1907	Chandos	Renamed from Hundred of Von Doussa in 1918
Hundred of Auld	1912	Chandos	
Hundred of Bews	1894	Chandos	
Hundred of Billiatt	1912	Chandos	
Hundred of Cotton	1894	Chandos	
Hundred of Day	1929	Chandos	
Hundred of Fisk	1969	Chandos	
Hundred of Kingsford	1912	Chandos	
Hundred of Parilla	1894	Chandos	
Hundred of Peebinga	1912	Chandos	
Hundred of Pinnaroo	1894	Chandos	
Hundred of Quirke	1969	Chandos	
Hundred of Von Doussa	1907-1918	Chandos	Renamed Hundred of Allenby in 1918
Hundred of Winikeberick	n/a	Chandos	1916 proposed renaming of Hundred of Von Doussa; rejected in 1918 for "Hundred of Allenby".
Hundred of Black Rock Plain	1871	Dalhousie	
Hundred of Coomooroo	1875	Dalhousie	
Hundred of Erskine	1876	Dalhousie	
Hundred of Eurelia	1876	Dalhousie	
Hundred of Mannanarie	1871	Dalhousie	
Hundred of Morgan	1876	Dalhousie	
Hundred of Oladdie	1876	Dalhousie	
Hundred of Pekina	1871	Dalhousie	
Hundred of Tarcowie	1871	Dalhousie	
Hundred of Walloway	1875	Dalhousie	
Hundred of Yalpara	1876	Dalhousie	
Hundred of Yongala	1871	Dalhousie	
Hundred of Barunga	1869	Daly	
Hundred of Cameron	1869	Daly	
Hundred of Clinton	1862	Daly	
Hundred of Kadina	1862	Daly	
Hundred of Kulpara	1862	Daly	
Hundred of Mundoora	1874	Daly	
Hundred of Ninnes	1874	Daly	
Hundred of Redhill	1869	Daly	
Hundred of Tickera	1874	Daly	
Hundred of Tiparra	1862	Daly	
Hundred of Wallaroo	1862	Daly	
Hundred of Wiltunga	1874	Daly	
Hundred of Wokurna	1874	Daly	
Hundred of Carawa	1893	Dufferin	
Hundred of Hague	1893	Dufferin	
Hundred of Haslam	1893	Dufferin	
Hundred of Koolgera	1916	Dufferin	
Hundred of Nunnyah	1913	Dufferin	
Hundred of Perlubie	1895	Dufferin	
Hundred of Petina	1893	Dufferin	
Hundred of Pureba	1922	Dufferin	
Hundred of Wallala	1913	Dufferin	
Hundred of Walpuppie	1913	Dufferin	
Hundred of Yantanabie	1913	Dufferin	
Hundred of Anna	1860	Eyre	
Hundred of Bagot	1860	Eyre	
Hundred of Beatty	1883	Eyre	Renamed from Hundred of Krichauff in 1918
Hundred of Bower	1882	Eyre	
Hundred of Brownlow	1883	Eyre	
Hundred of Dutton	1858	Eyre	
Hundred of Eba	1860	Eyre	
Hundred of English	1866	Eyre	
Hundred of Fisher	1860	Eyre	
Hundred of Hay	1860	Eyre	
Hundred of Jellicoe	1851	Eyre	Renamed from Hundred of North Rhine in 1918
Hundred of Neales	1866	Eyre	
Hundred of Skurray	1860	Eyre	
Hundred of Krichauff	1883-1918	Eyre	Renamed Hundred of Beatty in 1918
Hundred of North Rhine	1851-1918	Eyre	Renamed Hundred of Jellicoe in 1918
Hundred of Mundawora	n/a	Eyre	1916 proposed renaming of Hundred of Krichauff; rejected in 1918 for "Hundred of Beatty".
Hundred of Wiltowonga North	n/a	Eyre	1916 proposed renaming of Hundred of North Rhine; rejected in 1918 for "Hundred of Jellicoe".
Hundred of Carribie	1878	Fergusson	
Hundred of Coonarie	1878	Fergusson	
Hundred of Cunningham	1873	Fergusson	
Hundred of Curramulka	1874	Fergusson	
Hundred of Dalrymple	1872	Fergusson	
Hundred of Kilkerran	1872	Fergusson	
Hundred of Koolywurtie	1874	Fergusson	
Hundred of Maitland	1872	Fergusson	
Hundred of Melville	1869	Fergusson	
Hundred of Minlacowie	1874	Fergusson	
Hundred of Moorowie	1869	Fergusson	
Hundred of Muloowurtie	1874	Fergusson	
Hundred of Para Wurlie	1869	Fergusson	
Hundred of Ramsay	1872	Fergusson	
Hundred of Warrenben	1878	Fergusson	
Hundred of Wauraltee	1874	Fergusson	
Hundred of Cummins	1903	Flinders	
Hundred of Flinders	1903	Flinders	
Hundred of Hutchison	1867	Flinders	
Hundred of Koppio	1867	Flinders	
Hundred of Lake Wangary	1871	Flinders	
Hundred of Lincoln	1851	Flinders	
Hundred of Louth	1851	Flinders	
Hundred of Mortlock	1904	Flinders	
Hundred of Sleaford	1871	Flinders	
Hundred of Stokes	1878	Flinders	
Hundred of Uley	1871	Flinders	
Hundred of Ulipa	1879	Flinders	
Hundred of Wanilla	1871	Flinders	
Hundred of Warrow	1869	Flinders	
Hundred of Yaranyacka	1872	Flinders	
Hundred of Appila	1871	Frome	
Hundred of Baroota	1878	Frome	
Hundred of Booleroo	1875	Frome	
Hundred of Coonatto	1876	Frome	
Hundred of Darling	1891	Frome	
Hundred of Davenport	1860	Frome	
Hundred of Gregory	1858	Frome	
Hundred of Pinda	1876	Frome	
Hundred of Telowie	1874	Frome	
Hundred of Willochra	1875	Frome	
Hundred of Willowie	1875	Frome	
Hundred of Winninowie	1878	Frome	
Hundred of Wongyarra	1851	Frome	
Hundred of Woolundunga	1875	Frome	
Hundred of Alma	1856	Gawler	
Hundred of Balaklava	1856	Gawler	
Hundred of Dalkey	1856	Gawler	
Hundred of Dublin	1856	Gawler	
Hundred of Grace	1856	Gawler	
Hundred of Inkerman	1856	Gawler	
Hundred of Mudla Wirra	1847	Gawler	
Hundred of Port Gawler	1851	Gawler	
Hundred of Bendleby	1877	Granville	
Hundred of Eurilpa	1877	Granville	
Hundred of McCulloch	1886	Granville	
Hundred of Uroonda	1877	Granville	
Hundred of Wirreanda	1877	Granville	
Hundred of Yanyarrie	1877	Granville	
Hundred of Yednalue	1877	Granville	
Hundred of Benara	1862	Grey	
Hundred of Blanche	1858	Grey	
Hundred of Caroline	1862	Grey	
Hundred of Gambier	1858	Grey	
Hundred of Grey	1858	Grey	
Hundred of Hindmarsh	1858	Grey	
Hundred of Kennion	1883	Grey	
Hundred of Kongorong	1862	Grey	
Hundred of Lake George	1871	Grey	
Hundred of MacDonnell	1861	Grey	
Hundred of Mayurra	1869	Grey	
Hundred of Mingbool	1867	Grey	
Hundred of Monbulla	1861	Grey	
Hundred of Mount Muirhead	1869	Grey	
Hundred of Nangwarry	1867	Grey	
Hundred of Penola	1861	Grey	
Hundred of Riddoch	1883	Grey	
Hundred of Rivoli Bay	1871	Grey	
Hundred of Short	1883	Grey	
Hundred of Symon	1855	Grey	
Hundred of Young	1858	Grey	
Hundred of Katarapko	1922	Hamley	
Hundred of Loveday	1923	Hamley	
Hundred of Adams	1895	Hanson	
Hundred of Arkaba	1877	Hanson	
Hundred of French	1895	Hanson	Renamed from Hundred of Basedow in 1918
Hundred of Moralana	1895	Hanson	
Hundred of Warcowie	1895	Hanson	
Hundred of Basedow	1895-1918	Hanson	Renamed Hundred of French in 1918
Hundred of Perawillia	n/a	Hanson	1916 proposed renaming of Hundred of Basedow; rejected in 1918 for "Hundred of French".
Hundred of Cavenagh	1878	Herbert	
Hundred of Coglin	1878	Herbert	
Hundred of Minburra	1877	Herbert	
Hundred of Nackara	1880	Herbert	
Hundred of Paratoo	1880	Herbert	
Hundred of Waroonee	1880	Herbert	
Hundred of Alexandrina	1851	Hindmarsh	
Hundred of Bremer	1851	Hindmarsh	
Hundred of Encounter Bay	1846	Hindmarsh	
Hundred of Goolwa	1846	Hindmarsh	
Hundred of Kondoparinga	1846	Hindmarsh	
Hundred of Macclesfield	1846	Hindmarsh	
Hundred of Myponga	1846	Hindmarsh	
Hundred of Nangkita	1846	Hindmarsh	
Hundred of Strathalbyn	1850	Hindmarsh	
Hundred of Waitpinga	1846	Hindmarsh	
Hundred of Yankalilla	1846	Hindmarsh	
Hundred of Bice	1895	Hopetoun	
Hundred of Caldwell	1892	Hopetoun	
Hundred of Lucy	1894	Hopetoun	
Hundred of May	1894	Hopetoun	
Hundred of Miller	1892	Hopetoun	
Hundred of Russell	1895	Hopetoun	
Hundred of Sturdee	1892	Hopetoun	Renamed from Hundred of Scherk in 1918
Hundred of Trunch	1896	Hopetoun	
Hundred of Wookata	1902	Hopetoun	
Hundred of Scherk	1892-1918	Hopetoun	Renamed Hundred of Sturdee in 1918
Hundred of Pintumba	n/a	Hopetoun	1916 proposed renaming of Hundred of Scherk; rejected in 1918 for "Hundred of Sturdee".
Hundred of Boonerdo	1928	Jervois	
Hundred of Boothby	1878	Jervois	
Hundred of Brooker	1903	Jervois	
Hundred of Butler	1895	Jervois	
Hundred of Campoona	1895	Jervois	
Hundred of Charleston	1895	Jervois	
Hundred of Darke	1910	Jervois	
Hundred of Dixson	1903	Jervois	
Hundred of Glynn	1895	Jervois	
Hundred of Hambidge	1957	Jervois	
Hundred of Hawker	1878	Jervois	
Hundred of Heggaton	1910	Jervois	
Hundred of Hincks	1957	Jervois	
Hundred of James	1910	Jervois	
Hundred of Jamieson	1910	Jervois	
Hundred of Mangalo	1878	Jervois	
Hundred of Mann	1878	Jervois	
Hundred of McGregor	1895	Jervois	
Hundred of Miltalie	1878	Jervois	
Hundred of Minbrie	1878	Jervois	
Hundred of Moody	1903	Jervois	
Hundred of Murlong	1928	Jervois	
Hundred of Nicholls	1928	Jervois	
Hundred of Palkagee	1914	Jervois	
Hundred of Pascoe	1910	Jervois	
Hundred of Playford	1878	Jervois	
Hundred of Roberts	1907	Jervois	
Hundred of Rudall	1910	Jervois	
Hundred of Smeaton	1910	Jervois	
Hundred of Tooligie	1916	Jervois	
Hundred of Verran	1908	Jervois	
Hundred of Warren	1895	Jervois	
Hundred of Wilton	1897	Jervois	
Hundred of Yadnarie	1878	Jervois	
Hundred of Tassie	n/a	Jervois	Proposed name for what became Hundred of Nicholls.
Hundred of Gumbowie	1877	Kimberley	
Hundred of Hardy	1880	Kimberley	
Hundred of Ketchowla	1880	Kimberley	
Hundred of Parnaroo	1878	Kimberley	
Hundred of Terowie	1871	Kimberley	
Hundred of Wonna	1878	Kimberley	
Hundred of Bagster	1890	Kintore	
Hundred of Burgoyne	1890	Kintore	
Hundred of Cohen	1890	Kintore	
Hundred of Giles	1890	Kintore	
Hundred of Keith	1894	Kintore	
Hundred of Kevin	1894	Kintore	
Hundred of Magarey	1890	Kintore	
Hundred of Nash	1890	Kintore	
Hundred of Cocata	1928	Le Hunte	
Hundred of Cootra	1926	Le Hunte	
Hundred of Corrobinnie	1957	Le Hunte	
Hundred of Hill	1927	Le Hunte	
Hundred of Kappakoola	1913	Le Hunte	
Hundred of Koongawa	1926	Le Hunte	
Hundred of Mamblin	1913	Le Hunte	
Hundred of Minnipa	1913	Le Hunte	
Hundred of Palabie	1913	Le Hunte	
Hundred of Peella	1957	Le Hunte	
Hundred of Pinbong	1922	Le Hunte	
Hundred of Pordia	1925	Le Hunte	
Hundred of Pygery	1913	Le Hunte	
Hundred of Wannamana	1913	Le Hunte	
Hundred of Warramboo	1913	Le Hunte	
Hundred of Wudinna	1913	Le Hunte	
Hundred of Yaninee	1913	Le Hunte	
Hundred of Belvidere	1851	Light	
Hundred of Gilbert	1851	Light	
Hundred of Julia Creek	1851	Light	
Hundred of Kapunda	1851	Light	
Hundred of Light	1851	Light	
Hundred of Moorooroo	1847	Light	
Hundred of Nuriootpa	1847	Light	
Hundred of Saddleworth	1851	Light	
Hundred of Waterloo	1851	Light	
Hundred of Beeamma	1921	MacDonnell	
Hundred of Binnum	1869	MacDonnell	
Hundred of Duffield	1864	MacDonnell	
Hundred of Geegeela	1907	MacDonnell	Renamed from Hundred of Pflaum in 1918
Hundred of Glen Roy	1871	MacDonnell	
Hundred of Hynam	1869	MacDonnell	
Hundred of Lacepede	1861	MacDonnell	
Hundred of Landseer	1888	MacDonnell	
Hundred of Lochaber	1869	MacDonnell	
Hundred of Marcollat	1888	MacDonnell	
Hundred of Minecrow	1878	MacDonnell	
Hundred of Murrabinna	1871	MacDonnell	
Hundred of Parsons	1884	MacDonnell	
Hundred of Peacock	1888	MacDonnell	
Hundred of Woolumbool	1888	MacDonnell	
Hundred of Pflaum	1907-1918	MacDonnell	Renamed Hundred of Geegeela in 1918
Hundred of Castine	1891	Manchester	
Hundred of Copley	1891	Manchester	
Hundred of Gillen	1893	Manchester	
Hundred of Handyside	1891	Manchester	
Hundred of Jenkins	1892	Manchester	
Hundred of Barwell	1919	Musgrave	
Hundred of Blesing	1936	Musgrave	
Hundred of Colton	1876	Musgrave	
Hundred of Cowan	1929	Musgrave	
Hundred of Haig	1885	Musgrave	Renamed from Hundred of Homburg in 1918
Hundred of Hudd	1936	Musgrave	
Hundred of Kappawanta	1936	Musgrave	
Hundred of Kiana	1879	Musgrave	
Hundred of McIntosh	1934	Musgrave	
Hundred of McLachlan	1895	Musgrave	
Hundred of Mitchell	1903	Musgrave	
Hundred of Peachna	1916	Musgrave	
Hundred of Pearce	1884	Musgrave	
Hundred of Shannon	1903	Musgrave	
Hundred of Squire	1894	Musgrave	
Hundred of Talia	1881	Musgrave	
Hundred of Tinline	1881	Musgrave	
Hundred of Ulyerra	1925	Musgrave	
Hundred of Ward	1876	Musgrave	
Hundred of Way	1876	Musgrave	
Hundred of Homburg	1885-1918	Musgrave	Renamed Hundred of Haig in 1918
Hundred of Poondulta	n/a	Musgrave	1916 proposed renaming of Hundred of Homburg; rejected in 1918 for "Hundred of Haig".
Hundred of Boolcunda	1876	Newcastle	
Hundred of Crozier	1880	Newcastle	
Hundred of Cudlamudla	1877	Newcastle	
Hundred of Kanyaka	1876	Newcastle	
Hundred of Moockra	1877	Newcastle	
Hundred of Palmer	1876	Newcastle	
Hundred of Pichi Richi	1878	Newcastle	
Hundred of Wyacca	1880	Newcastle	
Hundred of Yarrah	1880	Newcastle	
Hundred of Bowaka	1871	Robe	
Hundred of Bray	1877	Robe	
Hundred of Coles	1885	Robe	
Hundred of Comaum	1861	Robe	
Hundred of Conmurra	1878	Robe	
Hundred of Fox	1885	Robe	
Hundred of Jessie	1867	Robe	
Hundred of Joanna	1862	Robe	
Hundred of Joyce	1876	Robe	
Hundred of Killanoola	1861	Robe	
Hundred of Mount Benson	1871	Robe	
Hundred of Naracoorte	1867	Robe	
Hundred of Robertson	1867	Robe	
Hundred of Ross	1877	Robe	
Hundred of Smith	1885	Robe	
Hundred of Spence	1886	Robe	
Hundred of Townsend	1878	Robe	
Hundred of Waterhouse	1861	Robe	
Hundred of Addison	1910	Robinson	
Hundred of Bockelberg	1971	Robinson	
Hundred of Campbell	1888	Robinson	
Hundred of Carina	1915	Robinson	
Hundred of Chandada	1913	Robinson	
Hundred of Condada	1913	Robinson	
Hundred of Cungena	1913	Robinson	
Hundred of Downer	1883	Robinson	
Hundred of Finlayson	1893	Robinson	
Hundred of Forrest	1885	Robinson	
Hundred of Inkster	1913	Robinson	
Hundred of Kaldoonera	1913	Robinson	
Hundred of Karcultaby	1913	Robinson	
Hundred of Moorkitabie	1915	Robinson	
Hundred of Murray	1888	Robinson	
Hundred of Ripon	1885	Robinson	
Hundred of Rounsevell	1885	Robinson	
Hundred of Scott	1888	Robinson	
Hundred of Tarlton	1888	Robinson	
Hundred of Travers	1910	Robinson	
Hundred of Wallis	1910	Robinson	
Hundred of Witera	1891	Robinson	
Hundred of McBeath	n/a	Robinson	Apparently never gazetted. North of Hundred of Downer.
Hundred of Wrenfordsley	1885	Robinson	
Hundred of Wright	1893	Robinson	
Hundred of Baker	1860	Russell	
Hundred of Bonney	1860	Russell	
Hundred of Burdett	1860	Russell	
Hundred of Coolinong	1872	Russell	
Hundred of Ettrick	1893	Russell	
Hundred of Jeffries	1936	Russell	
Hundred of Malcolm	1860	Russell	
Hundred of Seymour	1860	Russell	
Hundred of Younghusband	1860	Russell	
Hundred of Andrews	1864	Stanley	
Hundred of Ayers	1863	Stanley	
Hundred of Blyth	1860	Stanley	
Hundred of Boucaut	1867	Stanley	
Hundred of Clare	1850	Stanley	
Hundred of Everard	1867	Stanley	
Hundred of Goyder	1862	Stanley	
Hundred of Hall	1860	Stanley	
Hundred of Hanson	1860	Stanley	
Hundred of Hart	1864	Stanley	
Hundred of Koolunga	1869	Stanley	
Hundred of Milne	1860	Stanley	
Hundred of Stanley	1851	Stanley	
Hundred of Stow	1862	Stanley	
Hundred of Upper Wakefield	1850	Stanley	
Hundred of Yackamoorundie	1869	Stanley	
Hundred of Angas	1860	Sturt	
Hundred of Brinkley	1860	Sturt	
Hundred of Finniss	1860	Sturt	
Hundred of Freeling	1857	Sturt	
Hundred of Kanmantoo	1847	Sturt	
Hundred of Jutland	1851	Sturt	Renamed from Hundred of South Rhine in 1918
Hundred of Mobilong	1860	Sturt	
Hundred of Monarto	1847	Sturt	
Hundred of Ridley	1860	Sturt	
Hundred of Tungkillo	1851	Sturt	
Hundred of South Rhine	1851-1918	Sturt	Renamed Hundred of Jutland in 1918
Hundred of Wiltowonga South	n/a	Sturt	1916 proposed renaming of Hundred of South Rhine; rejected in 1918 for "Hundred of Jutland".
Hundred of Bunyeroo	1881	Taunton	
Hundred of Carr	1877	Taunton	
Hundred of Edeowie	1881	Taunton	
Hundred of Nilpena	1881	Taunton	
Hundred of Oratunga	1895	Taunton	
Hundred of Parachilna	1881	Taunton	
Hundred of Anne	1863	Victoria	
Hundred of Belalie	1870	Victoria	
Hundred of Booyoolie	1871	Victoria	
Hundred of Bundaleer	1869	Victoria	
Hundred of Caltowie	1871	Victoria	
Hundred of Crystal Brook	1871	Victoria	
Hundred of Howe	1891	Victoria	
Hundred of Napperby	1874	Victoria	
Hundred of Narridy	1871	Victoria	
Hundred of Pirie	1874	Victoria	
Hundred of Reynolds	1869	Victoria	
Hundred of Wandearah	1874	Victoria	
Hundred of Whyte	1869	Victoria	
Hundred of Yangya	1869	Victoria	
Hundred of Bartlett	1889	Way	
Hundred of Blacker	1893	Way	
Hundred of Bonython	1893	Way	
Hundred of Catt	1889	Way	
Hundred of Chillundie	1893	Way	
Hundred of Goode	1893	Way	
Hundred of Guthrie	1893	Way	
Hundred of Horn	1889	Way	
Hundred of Moule	1889	Way	
Hundred of O'Loughlin	1896	Way	
Hundred of Pethick	1929	Way	
Hundred of Wallanippie	1893	Way	
Hundred of Wandana	1893	Way	
Hundred of Ash	1895	York	
Hundred of Batchelor	1895	York	
Hundred of Cultana	1940	York	
Hundred of Moonabie	1917	York	
Hundred of Nilginee	1917	York	
Hundred of Poynton	1895	York	
Hundred of Randell	1895	York	
Hundred of Markaranka	1915	Young	
Hundred of Parcoola	1915	Young	
Hundred of Pooginook	1915	Young	
Hundred of Stuart	1860	Young	
