= Commissariat Point, South Australia =

Commissariat Point South Australia
- Coordinates: 32.53918143°S 137.74645373°E
- Population: 243 (SAL 2021)
- Established: 1994
- Postcode(s): 5700
- Time zone: ACST (UTC+9:30)
  - Summer (DST): ACST (UTC+10:30)
- Location: 270 km (168 mi) north north-west of Adelaide; 11 km (7 mi) south of Port Augusta
- LGA(s): City of Port Augusta
- Region: Far North
- County: Manchester
- State electorate(s): Stuart
- Federal division(s): Grey
Mean max temp	Mean min temp	Annual rainfall
26.3 °C; 79 °F	12.1 °C; 54 °F	214.1 mm 8.4 in
Suburbs around Commissariat Point:
Port Augusta West	Port Augusta West
Cultana	Commissariat Point	Spencer Gulf
Cultana	Blanche Harbor
- Footnotes: Coordinates; Climate; Adjoining localities

Commissariat Point is a locality in the Australian state of South Australia located on the east coast of the Eyre Peninsula overlooking Spencer Gulf about 270 kilometres (170 miles) north north-west of the state capital of Adelaide and about 11 kilometres (6.8 miles) south of the municipal seat in Port Augusta.

Its boundaries were created in 1994 for “the long established name” which is derived from the nearby headland of the same name. The locality includes the former Commissariat Point Shack Site.

Commissariat Point is bounded on its western side by a road named Shack Road which extends from Port Augusta West in the north along the coast with Spencer Gulf to the locality of Blanche Harbor and to localities in the south within the City of Whyalla. As of 2012, the southern end of the locality was zoned specifically for residential development intended for use as holiday accommodation. The land to the immediate west of Commissariat Point is located within the locality of Cultana which is fully occupied by the Cultana Training Area, a military training area used by the Australian Army.

Commissariat Point is located within the federal division of Grey, the state electoral district of Stuart and the local government area of the City of Port Augusta.
