= County of Kintore =

Kintore
- Cadastral division
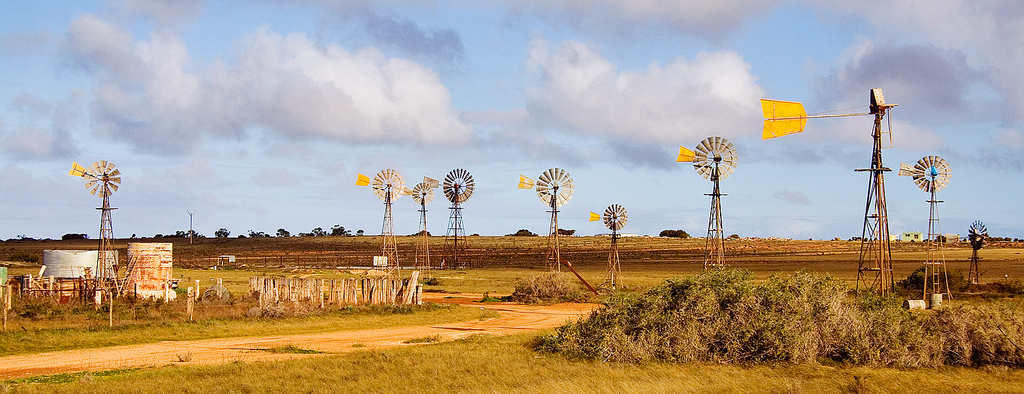
- Windmills at Penong in the county south

- Coordinates: 31.762°S 132.848°E
- Country: Australia
- State: South Australia
- LGA(s): Pastoral Unincorporated Area
- Established: 1890

Area
  - Total: 3,670 km^{2} (1,418 sq mi)
Lands administrative divisions around Kintore
Hopetoun	-	-
Hopetoun	Kintore	Way
Great Australian Bight	Great Australian Bight	Great Australian Bight

The County of Kintore is one of the 49 counties of South Australia. Located on the state's west coast, it was proclaimed in 1890 and named for the Governor Algernon Keith-Falconer.

== Hundreds ==
The County of Kintore contains the following 8 hundreds, covering approximately the southern half of its total area:

- From west to east in the modern locality of Bookabie: Nash, Magarey, Giles
- From northwest to southeast in the modern locality of Penong: Cohen, Burgoyne, Bagster, Kevin, Keith

== See also ==
- Lands administrative divisions of South Australia
