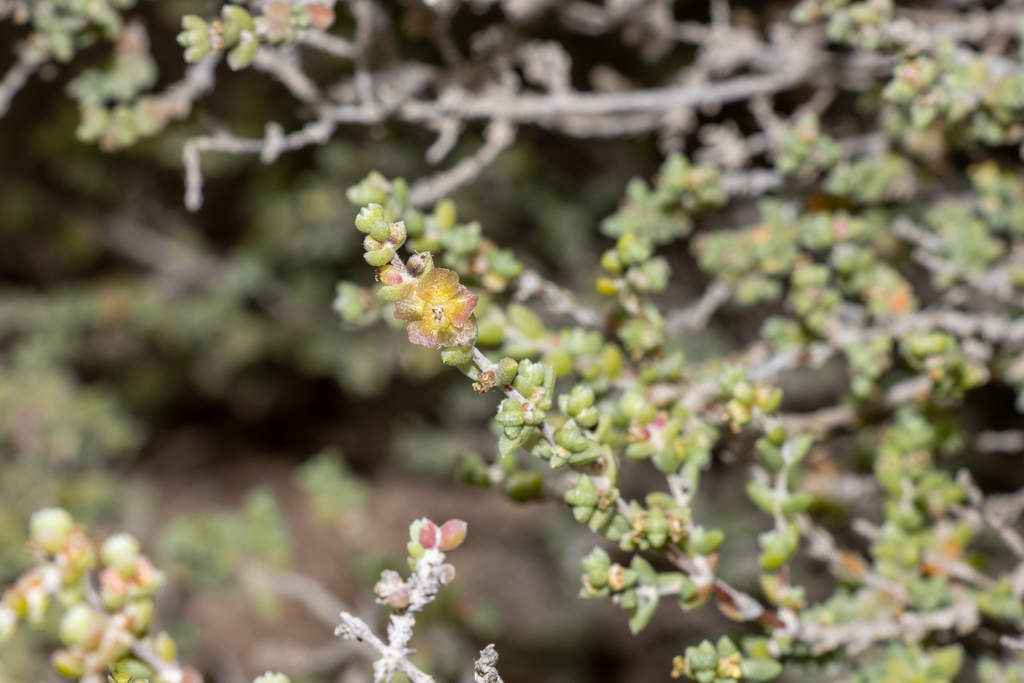
- In Fowlers Bay Conservation Park

Scientific classification
- Kingdom: Plantae
- Clade: Tracheophytes
- Clade: Angiosperms
- Clade: Eudicots
- Order: Caryophyllales
- Family: Amaranthaceae
- Genus: Maireana
- Species: M. oppositifolia

Binomial name
- Maireana oppositifolia (F.Muell.) Paul G.Wilson

Synonyms
- Kochia oppositifolia F.Muell.; Kochia oppositifolia F.Muell. isonym

= Maireana oppositifolia =

Species of plant in the amaranth family

Maireana oppositifolia, commonly known as heathy bluebush is a species of flowering plant in the family Amaranthaceae and is endemic to the south of continental Australia. It is a compact, usually dioecious shrub with woolly branches when young, narrowly egg-shaped leaves usually arranged in opposite pairs, flowers arranged singly, and a glabrous, thin-walled fruiting perianth with a fan-shaped, prominently-veined wing.

== Description ==
Maireana oppositifolia is a compact, fairly dense, much-branched shrub that typically grows to a height of up to 80 cm (31 in) and has young branches densely covered with short, woolly hairs. The leaves are arranged in more or less opposite pairs, egg-shaped, mostly 2–3 mm (0.079–0.118 in) long and broadly keeled in the lower surface and flat or concave above. The flowers are dioecious, arranged singly, the fruiting perianth glabrous, with a broadly conical to convex, thin-walled tube with five fan-shaped, prominently veined wings spreading unevenly.

== Taxonomy ==
This species was first formally described in 1855 by Ferdinand von Mueller who gave it the name Kochia oppositifolia in his Definitions of rare or hitherto undescribed Australian plants. In 1975, Paul Wilson transferred the species to Maireana as M. oppositifolia in the journal Nuytsia. The specific epithet (oppositifolia) means 'opposite-leaved'.

== Distribution and habitat ==
Heathy bluebush grows in clay loam and sand on mud flats, salt lakes, saline flats and salt pans in the Avon Wheatbelt, Carnarvon, Coolgardie, Esperance Plains, Great Victoria Desert, Hampton, Jarrah Forest, Mallee, Murchison, Nullarbor and Yalgoo bioregions of south-western Western Australia, the south of South Australia and the far north-west of Victoria.

== Conservation status ==
Maireana oppositifolia is listed as "not threatened" by the Government of Western Australia Department of Biodiversity, Conservation and Attractions, but as "endangered" in Victoria under the Victorian Government Flora and Fauna Guarantee Act 1988.
