= District Council of Coober Pedy =

Coordinates: 29°01′00″S 134°45′00″E

- Local government area
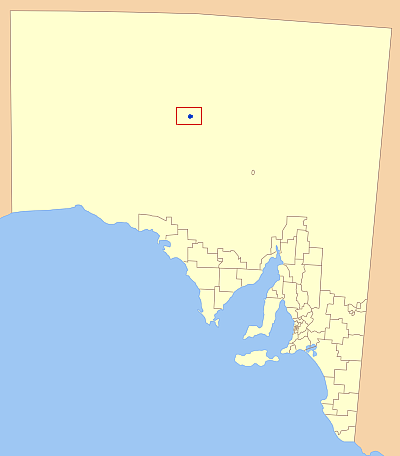
- Location of the District Council of Coober Pedy in blue

- Interactive map of District Council of Coober Pedy
- Country: Australia
- State: South Australia
- Region: Far North
- Established: 1987
- Council seat: Coober Pedy

Government
  - Mayor: Les Hoad
  - State electorate: Giles
  - Federal division: Grey

Area
  - Total: 77.8 km^{2} (30.0 sq mi)

Population
  - Total: 1,566 (LGA 2021)
- Website: District Council of Coober Pedy
LGAs around District Council of Coober Pedy
Outback Communities Authority	Outback Communities Authority	Outback Communities Authority
Outback Communities Authority	District Council of Coober Pedy	Outback Communities Authority
Outback Communities Authority	Outback Communities Authority	Outback Communities Authority

The District Council of Coober Pedy is a local government area located around the opal mining town of the same name in Outback South Australia. The district's economy is based on the large opal deposits found beneath it, which have made it a major mining centre and also a popular tourist destination.

== History ==
The town of Coober Pedy was settled entirely for the large finds of opal nearby, with the first deposits uncovered in 1915, before substantially more miners moved in by 1917. The town was named ‘Coober Pedy’ by the local Progress and Miners Association in 1920 from the Aboriginal words "Kupa Piti", meaning white man's hole or waterhole.

With a growing population of over 3000 in 1980, the move was made to establish local government in the area. Although there was some initial controversy, the first elections were held in 1987, signalling the establishment of the council.

== Economy ==
Since the establishment of the town, the district has relied nearly solely on the mining of the gemstone opal. After the initial discovery in 1915, a number of large strikes, particularly in 1946 saw renewed interest, and by the 1960s, opal mining was a multimillion-dollar industry, and has remained that way to the present day.

Tourism is a rapidly growing facet of the districts economy, with tourists visiting the area to see the opal mines and the unique underground lifestyle of the town.

== Localities ==
The town of Coober Pedy is the only locality in the district, but the council is not confined exclusively to the town area, and includes the neighbouring opal mining fields.

== Elected members ==
Ward	Councillor	Notes
Mayor	Les Hoad	
Unsubdivided	Kylie Hay	
Unsubdivided	Ian Crombie	
Unsubdivided	Boro Rapaic	
Unsubdivided	Nick Brellas	
Unsubdivided	Carrie Adamo	
Unsubdivided	Neville Mitchell George Naumovic Des Roffey	

The District Council of Coober Pedy has a directly elected mayor.

As of 23 January 2019, DCCP is under an Administrator, with all Elected Members suspended for an initial period of 12 months.
