= Coorabie =

- Town
- Coordinates: 31.9007°S 132.2956°E
- Country: Australia
- State: South Australia
- Region: Eyre Western
- LGA: Pastoral Unincorporated Area
- Location: 156 km (97 mi) W of Ceduna; 17 km (11 mi) NW of Fowlers Bay; 675 km (419 mi) NW of Adelaide
- Established: 25 February 1915 (town); 8 February 2001 (locality)

Government
  - State electorate: Flinders
  - Federal division: Grey

Population
  - Total: 71 (SAL 2021)
- Postcode: 5690
- County: Hopetoun
- Mean max temp: 21.5 °C (70.7 °F)
- Mean min temp: 12.3 °C (54.1 °F)
- Annual rainfall: 300.2 mm (11.82 in)
Localities around Coorabie
Yalata	Yalata	Yalata
Great Australian Bight	Coorabie	Yalata; Fowlers Bay
Great Australian Bight	Great Australian Bight	Fowlers Bay
- Location; Adjoining localities

Coorabie is a town and locality in the Australian state of South Australia located about 675 kilometres (419 mi) north-west of the state capital of Adelaide. It is outside of district council boundaries, and therefore managed by the Outback Communities Authority. It is located in the west of South Australia, and includes the Wahgunyah Conservation Park. The Eyre Highway passes through the locality, although the Coorabie township is south of the highway.

Construction of helicopter landing facilities began in 2015, to serve the BP/Statoil oil exploration project in the Great Australian Bight.
