= Yalata Mission Airport =

- IATA: KYI; ICAO: YYTA

Summary
- Location: Yalata, South Australia
- Elevation AMSL: 331 ft / 101 m
- Coordinates: 31°28′14″S 131°49′30″E

Map

Runways
Direction	Length		Surface
Direction	ft	m	Surface
1 (12/30)	3,937	1,200	Asphalt

Yalata Mission Airport (IATA:KYI, ICAO:YYTA) is a small, regional airport that serves the small community of Yalata, South Australia.

== Facilities ==
The airport has one runway made of asphalt with a heading of approximately 12/30 and length of 1200 m (3937 ft).
