= Blanche Harbour-Douglas Bank Aquatic Reserve =

Protected area in South Australia

- IUCN category VI (protected area with sustainable use of natural resources)
- Location within South Australia
- Location: South Australia
- Nearest city: Port Augusta.
- Coordinates: 32.7039°S 137.7680°E
- Area: 33.46 km^{2} (12.92 sq mi)
- Established: 1 January 1980
- Governing body: Primary Industries and Regions SA (PIRSA)

Blanche Harbour-Douglas Bank Aquatic Reserve is a marine protected area in the Australian state of South Australia located in the waters of Spencer Gulf adjoining the localities of Blanche Harbor and Cultana on the east coast of Eyre Peninsula.

It was declared in 1980 to protect “the mangrove-seagrass communities and the associated fish nursery areas for fisheries management”.

Since 2012, it has been located within the boundaries of a "sanctuary zone" in the Upper Spencer Gulf Marine Park.

The aquatic reserve is classified as an IUCN Category VI protected area.

== See also ==
- Protected areas of South Australia
