= Wahgunyah Conservation Park =

Protected area in South Australia

- IUCN category VI (protected area with sustainable use of natural resources)
- Location within South Australia
- Location: South Australia
- Nearest city: Fowlers Bay.
- Coordinates: 31°45′29″S 131°53′48″E
- Area: 483.2 km^{2} (186.6 sq mi)
- Established: 23 August 2001
- Governing body: Department for Environment and Water
- Website: Official website

Wahgunyah Conservation Park is a protected area located on the west coast of South Australia about 20 kilometres (12 miles) west of the town of Fowlers Bay. The conservation park is classified as an IUCN Category VI protected area.
