= Blanche Harbor, South Australia =

Blanche Harbor South Australia
- Coordinates: 32.690490°S 137.754280°E
- Population: 32 (SAL 2021)
- Established: 1994
- Postcode(s): 5700
- Time zone: ACST (UTC+9:30)
  - Summer (DST): ACST (UTC+10:30)
- Location: 260 km (162 mi) north north-west of Adelaide city centre; 20 km (12 mi) south of Port Augusta
- LGA(s): City of Port Augusta
- State electorate(s): Stuart
- Federal division(s): Grey
Mean max temp	Mean min temp	Annual rainfall
26.3 °C; 79 °F	12.1 °C; 54 °F	214.1 mm 8.4 in
Suburbs around Blanche Harbor:
Cultana	Commissariat Point
Cultana	Blanche Harbor	Spencer Gulf
Cultana	Cultana
- Footnotes: Coordinates; Climate

Blanche Harbor is a locality in South Australia located on the east coast of the Eyre Peninsula overlooking Spencer Gulf about 260 kilometres (160 miles) north north-west of the Adelaide city centre and about 20 kilometres (12 miles) south of the centre of Port Augusta.

Its boundaries were created in 1994 for “the long established name” which is derived from nearby bay of the same name. The locality includes the former Douglas Point South Shack Site.

Blanche Harbor consists of an extent of low-rise dwellings adjoining a road named Shack Road which extends from Port Augusta West in the north along the coast with Spencer Gulf to localities in the south within the City of Whyalla. As of 2012, the locality is zoned specifically for residential development intended for use as holiday accommodation. The land to the immediate west of Blanche Harbor is located within the Cultana Training Area, a military training area used by the Australian Army.

Blanche Harbor is located within the federal division of Grey, the state electoral district of Stuart and the local government area of the City of Port Augusta.

== See also ==
- Blanche Harbour-Douglas Bank Aquatic Reserve
