= County of Hopetoun =

Hopetoun
- Cadastral division
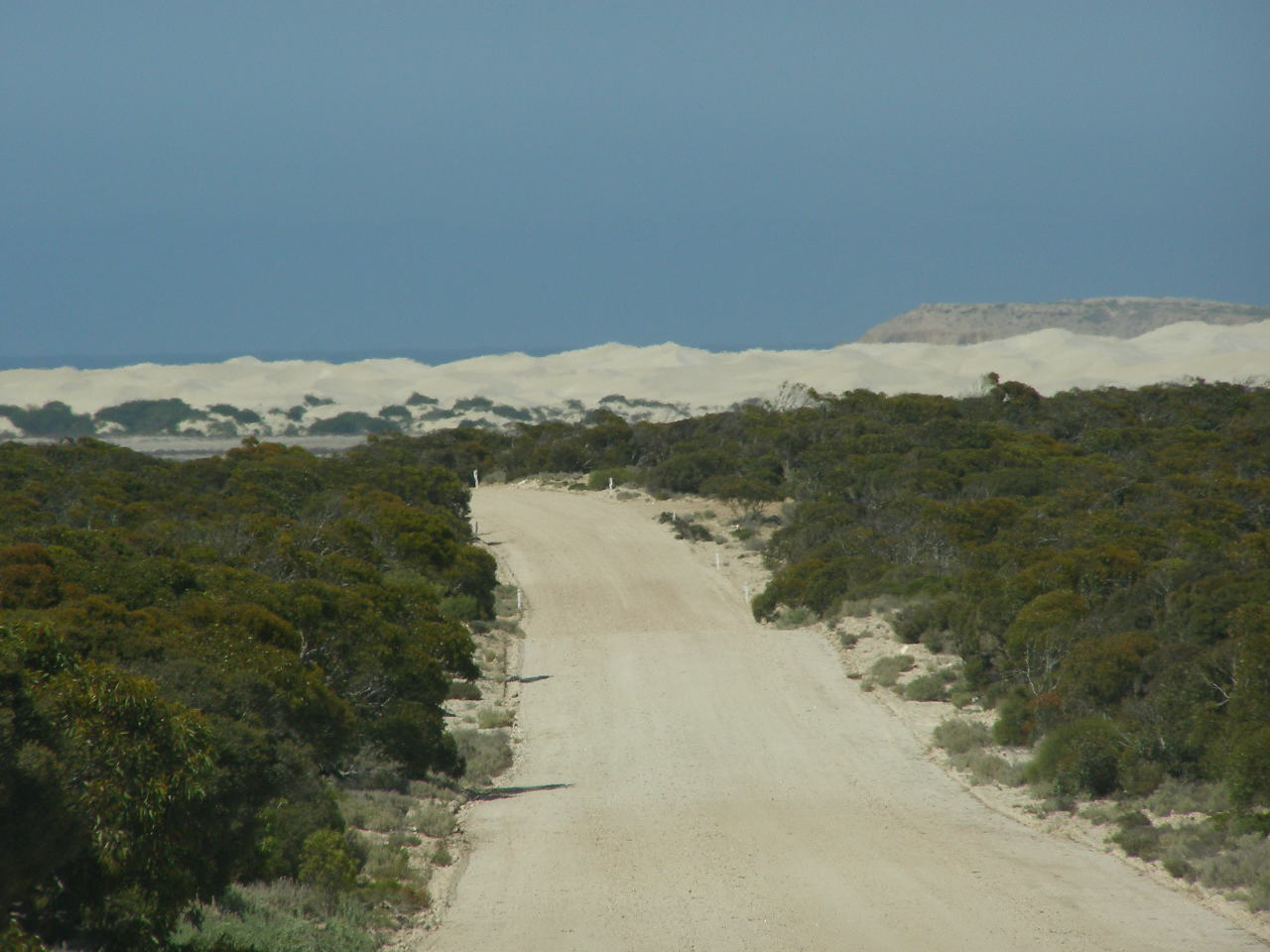
- Approach to Fowlers Bay in the Hundred of Caldwell

- Coordinates: 31.553°S 131.981°E
- Country: Australia
- State: South Australia
- LGA(s): District Council of Ceduna
- Established: 21 January 1892

Area
  - Total: 6,200 km^{2} (2,400 sq mi)
Lands administrative divisions around Hopetoun
pastoral unincorporated	pastoral unincorporated	pastoral unincorporated
pastoral unincorporated	Hopetoun	Kintore
Great Australian Bight	Great Australian Bight	Great Australian Bight

The County of Hopetoun is one of the 49 counties of South Australia on the state's west coast. It was proclaimed in 1892 by Governor Algernon Keith-Falconer and named for John Hope then the Governor of Victoria.

== Hundreds ==
The County of Hopetoun contains the following 9 hundreds, covering approximately the south-eastern half of its total area:

- Inland from northwest to southeast: Bice, Lucy, Miller, Trunch, and May (Yalata, Coorabie)
- On the south coastline from west to east: Russell, Wookata, Sturdee, and Caldwell (Coorabie, Fowlers Bay)

== See also ==
- Lands administrative divisions of South Australia
