= County of York (South Australia) =

York South Australia
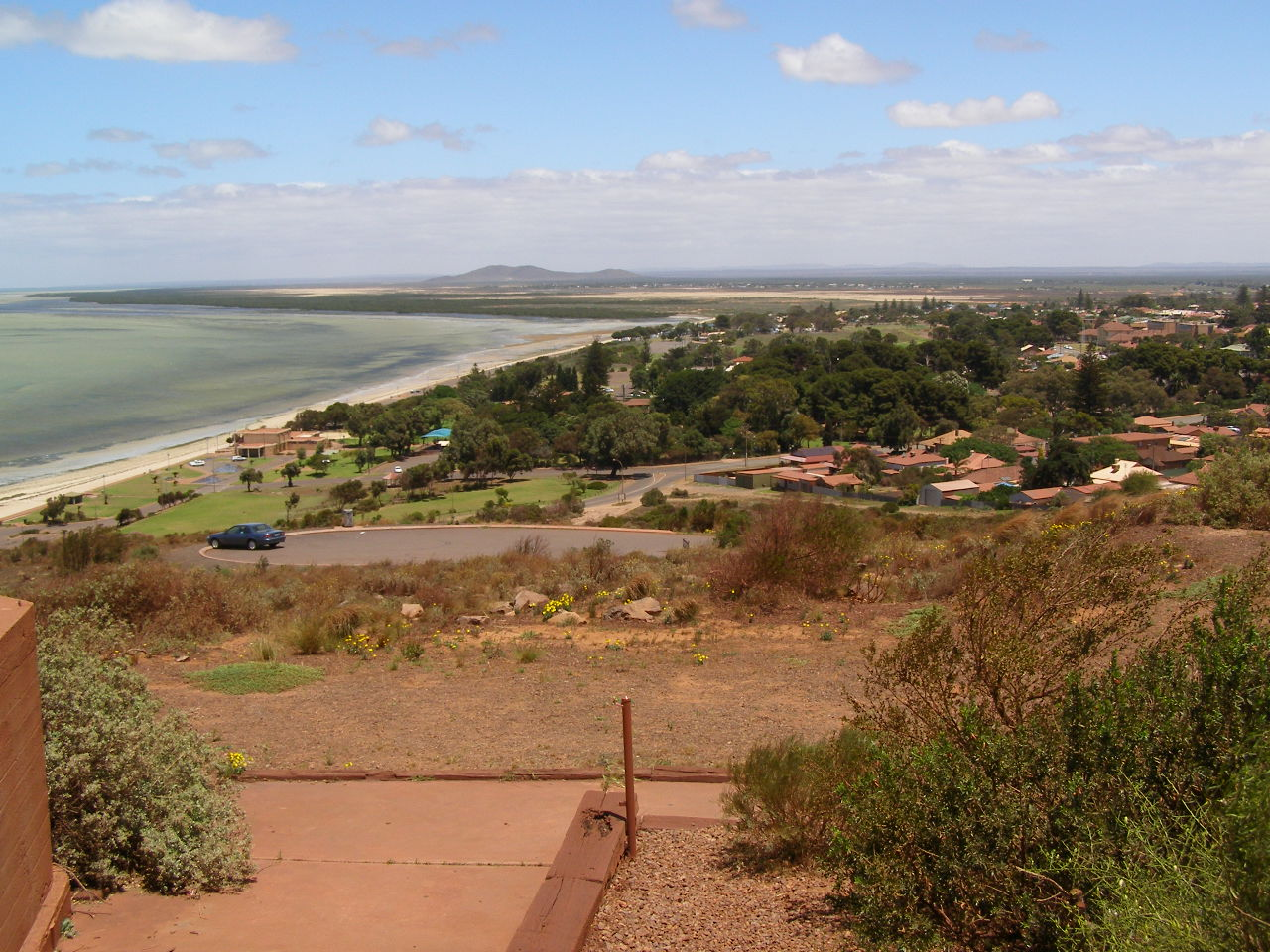
- View of Spencer Gulf coastline from Hummock Hill, Whyalla, in the Hundred of Randell

- Coordinates: 33.08°S 137.21°E
- Established: 1895
- Area: 3,419 km^{2} (1,320.1 sq mi)
- LGA(s): City of Whyalla
Lands administrative divisions around York:
Hore-Ruthven	Manchester	Frome
Buxton	York	Spencer Gulf
Jervois	Jervois	Spencer Gulf

The County of York is one of the 49 cadastral counties of South Australia. It was proclaimed by acting Governor Samuel Way in 1895 and named for King George V who was known at the time as the Duke of York. It covers a portion of the state on the Eyre Peninsula east coast at the latitude of Whyalla. It stretches westwards to the eastern boundary of Lake Gilles Conservation Park

== Hundreds ==
The County of York includes the following 7 hundreds:

- Hundred of Cultana (Cultana, Port Bonython)
- Hundred of Ash (Middleback Range, Myola Station)
- Hundred of Randell (Middleback Range, Whyalla, Mullaquana)
- Hundred of Nilginee (Secret Rocks, Cooyerdoo)
- Hundred of Moonabie (Middleback Range, Cooyerdoo)
- Hundred of Batchelor (Middleback Range)
- Hundred of Poynton (Middleback Range, Murninnie Beach)
