= Yalata, South Australia =

Indigenous Protected Area and township in western South Australia

Yalata
- Town
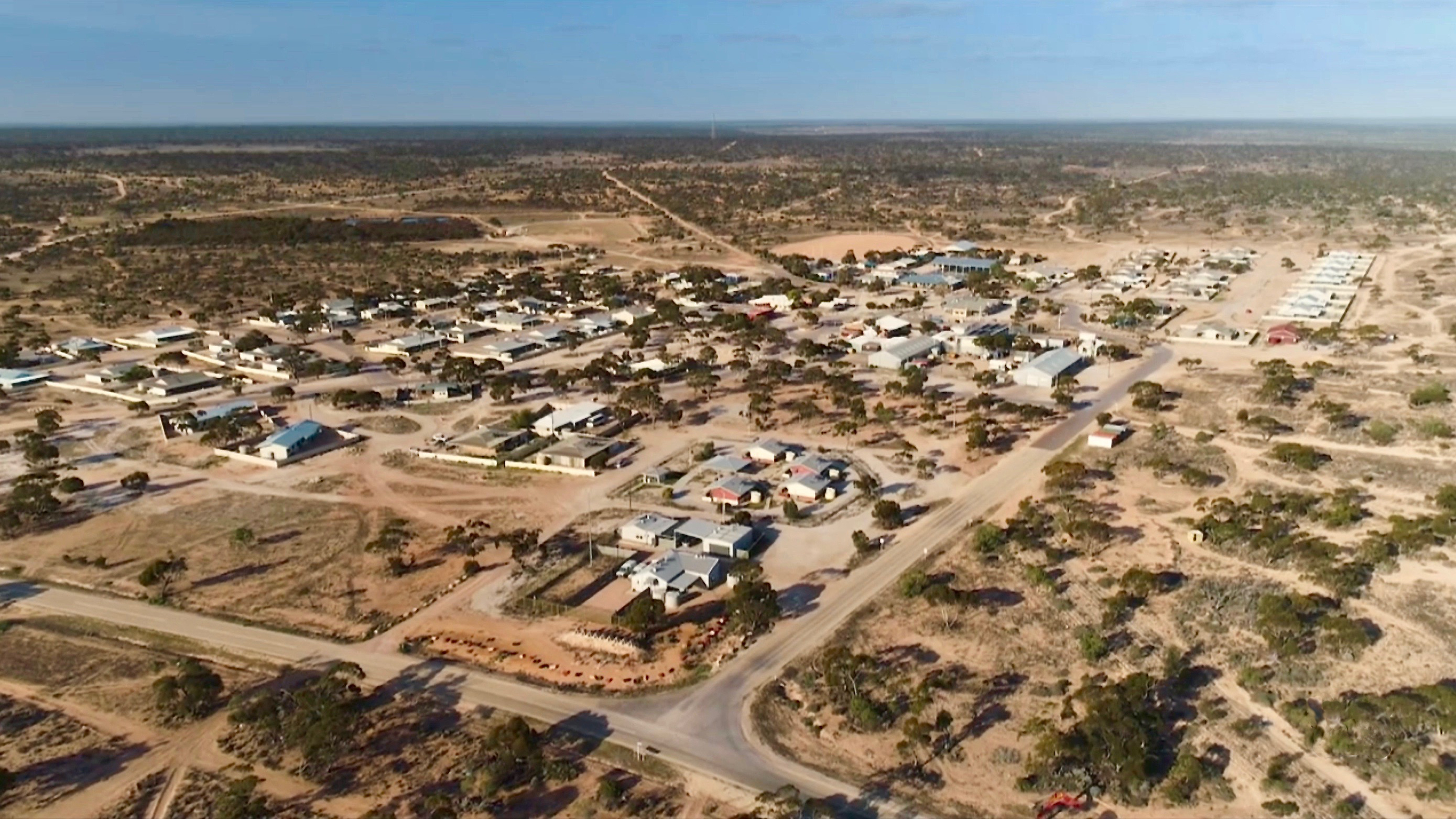
- Yalata township looking north-east

- Coordinates: 31°23′03″S 131°37′14″E
- Country: Australia
- State: South Australia
- Region: Eyre Western
- LGA: Aboriginal Council of Yalata
- Location: 982 km (610 mi) by road and 738 km (459 mi) direct, north-west of Adelaide; 206 km (128 mi) by road and 189 km (117 mi) direct, west-north-west of Ceduna; 95 km (59 mi) by road and 88 km (55 mi) direct, east of the WA-SA border
- Established: Mission: 1954, 1994. Locality: 23 October 2003

Government
  - State electorate: Flinders
  - Federal division: Grey

Area
  - Total: 4,563 km^{2} (1,762 sq mi)
- Elevation: 90 m (300 ft)

Population
  - Total: 302 (UCL 2021)
- Time zone: UTC+9:30 (ACST)
  - Summer (DST): UTC+10:30 (ACDT)
- Postcode: 5690
- County: Hopetoun (part)
- Mean max temp: 23.8 °C (74.8 °F)
- Mean min temp: 10.8 °C (51.4 °F)
- Annual rainfall: 252.6 mm (9.94 in)
Localities around Yalata
| Nullarbor | Nullarbor; Yellabinna | Yellabinna; Chundaria |
| Nullarbor | Yalata | Yellabinna; Mitchidy Moola |
| Great Australian Bight | Great Australian Bight; Coorabie; Fowlers Bay | Mitchidy Moola; Fowlers Bay |

Yalata (/ˈjælətɑː/ yal-ə-TAH), in the isolated far west of South Australia, is both an Indigenous Protected Area and, within that, a township of the same name where an Aboriginal community lives. The township is 206 kilometres (128 mi) west of Ceduna – the nearest town – via the Eyre Highway, and 982 kilometres (610 miles) by road from the state capital, Adelaide. It lies on the traditional lands of the Wirangu people. The settlement began as Yalata Mission in the early 1950s when Pila Nguru people were moved from Ooldea Mission when that closed, after previously being moved from their land in the Great Victoria Desert owing to nuclear testing by the British Government. The old Colona sheep station nearby is now part of Yalata Indigenous Protected Area.

The Atlas of South Australia describes the Yalata area as:

...sandy plain with deep sand and parabolic dunes. The vegetative cover is open mallee scrub with a mixed understory of chenopod shrubs and grasses and low open woodland with a chenopod shrub understory.

== Demography ==
In the 2021 census, the Yalata Indigenous Protected Area, including the Yalata township, had a population of 313 and the township's population was 302 – an increase of 54 or 22 per cent from the 2016 census – of whom 277 were Aboriginal. The population habitually fluctuates, up to about 500, depending on cultural business, seasons and other factors. Pitjantjatja was spoken as the primary language in 77.0% of homes in the Yalata area, specifically a southern dialect. Stated religious affiliation of residents was Lutheran 57.2%, Australian Aboriginal traditional religions 4.5%, and Anglican 1.0%; 23.6% made no statement as to religion and 11.8% stated "no religion".

== History ==
Yalata lies on the traditional lands of the Wirangu people. Decades after the European settlement of South Australia began in 1836, a 5000 ha (12,000-acre) sheep station known as Yalata station was established, with its homestead built in 1880 on a high hill inland from Fowlers Bay, where there was then a town known as Yalata. Its land stretched from the Nullarbor Plain across to Point Brown near Streaky Bay on the Eyre Peninsula. The huge sheep station ran up to 120,000 sheep at times.

In the 1950s, areas around Maralinga and Emu were used for nuclear testing by the British Government. Around this time the Australian Government resumed much Anangu land to be used for the Woomera Rocket testing Range. Aboriginal people in the area, who were Pila Nguru (Spinifex people, of the Great Victoria Desert) were moved to a United Aborigines Mission (UAM) at Ooldea, before that closed in 1952 due to internal divisions. The people did not want to move from there, as they were used to ranging the desert, and had used the Ooldea Soak as a water source for many generations.

In 1951 South Australian Government bought the entire Yalata sheep station, including its 7000 sheep, "for the benefit and use of aborigines", and in 1954 turned the whole area, other than two sections, into an Aboriginal reserve under the South Australian Aborigines Protection Board. The "spiritual welfare and education" of the Aboriginal people were handed over to the Evangelical Lutheran Church of Australia, South Australian District, who would also run the property as a sheep station, with the remaining more than 6000 sheep. The Board would contribute to the cost of caring for the people, and take care of their medical needs, and hoped to establish "a worthy institution".

A group of Ooldea people who were in the process of moving themselves to Ernabella and many others were forcibly removed to Yalata, which was an environment quite alien to them. Missionaries from the Koonibba Mission assisted with the move to the reserve, where the Ooldea people remained for two years before the Yalata Mission was created. Before the mission was set up, the Lutherans were concerned that having a different denomination such as the UAM running a mission so close to Koonibba would confuse the Aboriginal people who would inevitably move between the two, as the teachings were different. The Lutheran missionaries planned to teach the mission residents how to raise sheep, and the mission would be run in conjunction with Koonibba. The government would take about 50% of the gross income of the station.

The mission included administrative buildings, a school and a store. Residents lived in two camps: the "Big Camp" moved around the reserve at different times of the year, while Aboriginal mission workers and their families", and some of the elderly or sick residents lived in the "Little Camp".

By 1969, many of the 300 people living at the mission were working on the nearby Colona Station (which by around 2007 was part of the Yalata Indigenous Protected Area).

In 1974 the Yalata Community Council took over the whole reserve, and the mission ceased operation as a mission.

The Maralinga Tjarutja native title land was handed back to the Anangu under legislation passed by both houses of the South Australian Parliament in December 1984 and proclaimed in January 1985. The Yalata Aboriginal lands cover 4580 km^{2} (1770 sq mi) and span approximately 150 km (93 mi) of the Eyre Highway. Inland Anangu resettled on the land in 1995 and formed a community at Oak Valley. Regular movement of Anangu between Yalata and Oak Valley continued to occur.

Yalata Roadhouse was closed in 2006.

In August 2007, fire destroyed the shed-structure police station and associated home, with damage estimated at A$500,000.

In July 2018, a unit of the Australian Army were posted in Yalata charged with building a new staff house and a child care centre; roadworks; upgrading the caravan park; and safely demolishing the old asbestos-riddled Yalata roadhouse.

== Governance ==
Yalata is governed at the local level by the Yalata Community Council, one of the several local government bodies in South Australia classified as Aboriginal Councils (AC). Yalata Land is held in trust under the Aboriginal Lands Trust Act 1966 and covers an area of 456,300 ha (1,128,000 acres).

At the state and federal levels, Yalata lies in the electoral district of Flinders and at the division of Grey, respectively.

== Facilities ==
There is a caravan park to assist tourists passing through or visiting the Great Australian Bight for fishing or whale watching.

Yalata Anangu School provides R-12 education.

The swimming pool reopened around 2024 after a period of closure, after much needed upgrades, including new rescue and safety equipment as well as new staff.

Yalata Mission Airport is a single-runway airstrip that serves the community and nearby lands.
