= Hundred of Allenby =

The Hundred of Allenby is a hundred in the county of Chandos County in South Australia. The Hundred is in the Murray Mallee region of South Australia, near the border with Victoria, Australia.

The hundred was originally gazetted as the Hundred of Von Doussa (German: [fɔn ˈduːsa]) in 1907, but the name was changed due to the World War I and the hundred's present designation is for Edmund Allenby, 1st Viscount Allenby.

The traditional custodians of the area are the Ngargad people.

The railway arrived in the area in 1906.
