= Fowlers Bay Conservation Park =

Protected area in South Australia

- IUCN category VI (protected area with sustainable use of natural resources)
- Location within South Australia
- Location: South Australia
- Nearest city: Fowlers Bay.
- Coordinates: 31°56′53″S 132°23′41″E
- Area: 87.27 km^{2} (33.70 sq mi)
- Established: 11 November 1993
- Governing body: Department for Environment and Water

Fowlers Bay Conservation Park (previously known as the Fowlers Bay Conservation Reserve) is a protected area located in the west of South Australia on the coastline of the Great Australian Bight in the gazetted locality of Fowlers Bay. The conservation park is classified as an IUCN Category VI protected area.

The historic Whale Bone Area and Point Fowler Look-Out Structure within the conservation park are listed on the South Australian Heritage Register as designated places of archaeological significance.
