= Hundred of Downer =

Administrative division of South Australia

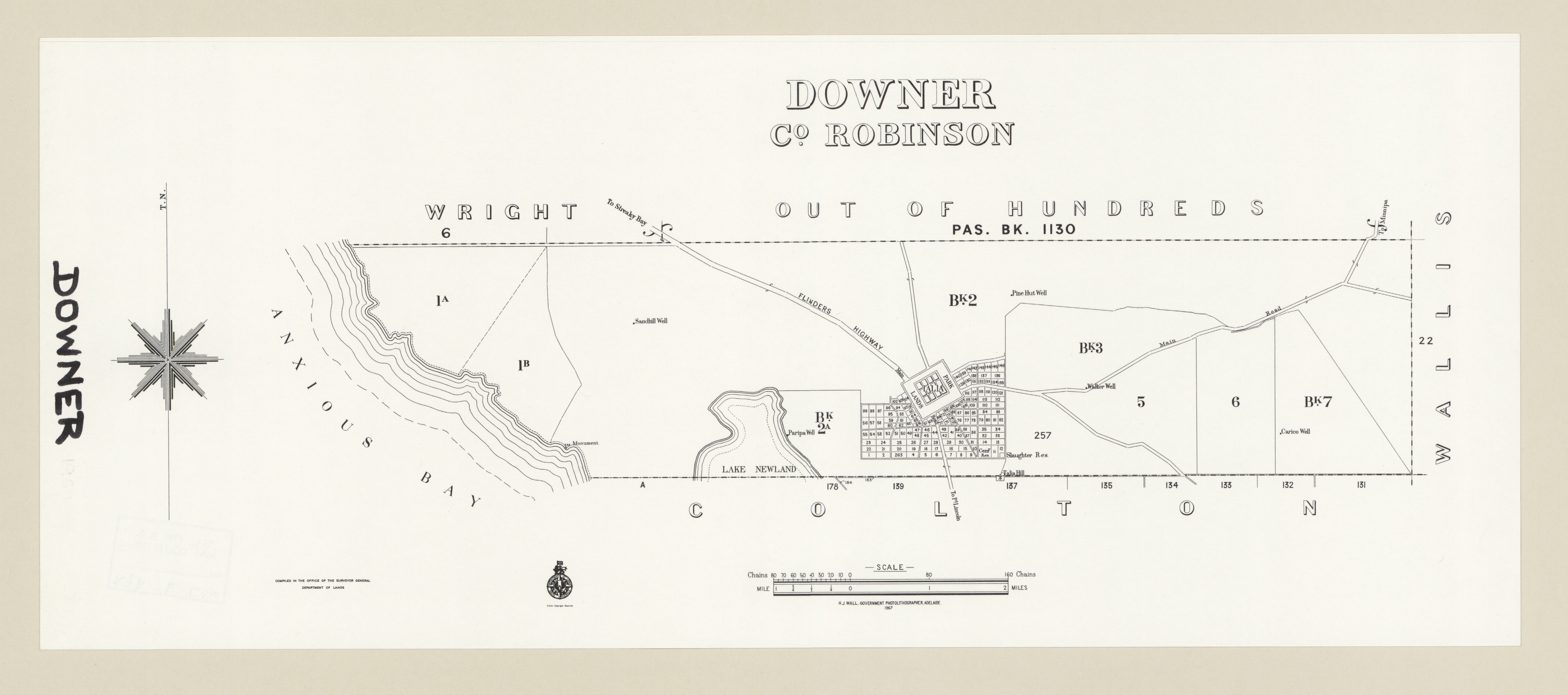
Hundred of Downer, 1967

The Hundred of Downer is a cadastral hundred of County of Robinson in South Australia.

The main town of the area is Talia, South Australia.

The traditional owners of the area were the Nauo Aboriginal people. In 1802 Matthew Flinders came past the district whilst on his voyage in the Investigator. The first European land exploration was that of John Hill and Samuel Stephens in 1839, followed shortly after by Edward John Eyre in the same year.

The Hundred of Downer, County of Robinson, was proclaimed on 10 May 1883; its school opened in 1889 and closed in 1906.
