= Bookabie, South Australia =

Bookabie
- Suburb
- Coordinates: 31.843288°S 132.675268°E
- Country: Australia
- State: South Australia
- Region: Eyre Western
- LGA: Pastoral Unincorporated Area
- Location: 648 km (403 mi) NW of Adelaide; 103 km (64 mi) NW of Ceduna
- Established: 27 August 1891 (town); 23 October 2003 (locality)

Government
  - State electorate: Flinders
  - Federal division: Grey

Population
  - Total: 289 (shared with Penong) (2016 census) (Note: For the 2016 census, the 'State Suburb of Penong' consisted of the localities of Bookabie and Penong.)
- Time zone: UTC+9:30 (ACST)
  - Summer (DST): UTC+10:30 (ACST)
- Postcode: 5690
- County: Kintore
- Mean max temp: 21.5 °C (70.7 °F)
- Mean min temp: 12.3 °C (54.1 °F)
- Annual rainfall: 300.2 mm (11.82 in)
Suburbs around Bookabie
| Fowlers Bay | Mitchidy Moola; Yellabinna; Nanbona; Yellabinna | Yellabinna |
| Fowlers Bay | Bookabie | Penong |
| Great Australian Bight | Great Australian Bight | Penong |
- Location; Adjoining localities

Bookabie is a town and locality in the Australian state of South Australia located on the state’s west coast overlooking the Great Australian Bight about 648 kilometres (403 miles) north-west of the state capital of Adelaide and about 103 kilometres (64 miles) west of the town centre of Ceduna.

The name was first used for a town located in the Hundred of Magarey which was surveyed in July 1890 and officially named by Governor Kintore on 27 August 1891. The name was recorded by the journalist, Daisy Bates, as being derived from an Aboriginal word meaning “bad water” which was used by local Aboriginal people for a waterhole near the town. Boundaries for the locality including the town were created on 23 October 2003 with some additional “unincorporated land” being added on 26 April 2013.

The locality of Bookabie consists of land associated with a section of coastline overlooking the Great Australian Bight including the eastern side of Fowlers Bay including the bay’s eastern headland. The Eyre Highway passes through the locality in an east-west direction. As of 2012, the majority land use within the locality was agriculture while the land adjoining the coastline in the south being zoned for conservation.

The 2016 Australian census which was conducted in August 2016 reports that the localities of Bookabie and Penong shared a population of 289 people.

Bookabie is located within the federal Division of Grey, the state electoral district of Flinders and the Pastoral Unincorporated Area of South Australia.
