= Fowlers Bay, South Australia =

Fowlers Bay
- Town
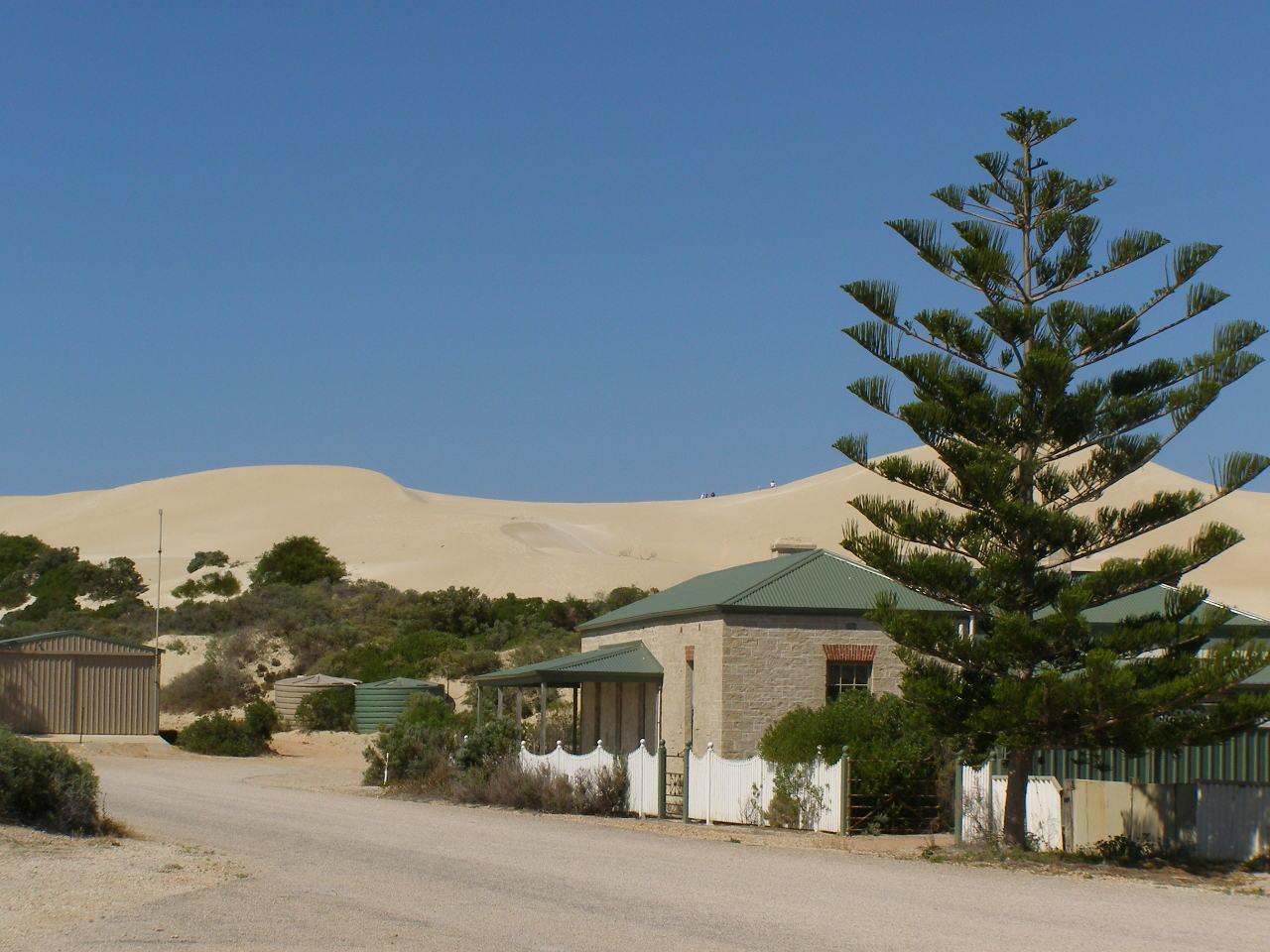
- Town of Fowlers Bay

- Coordinates: 31°59′25″S 132°26′09″E
- Country: Australia
- State: South Australia
- Region: Eyre Western
- LGA: Pastoral Unincorporated Area
- Location: 658 km (409 mi) NW of Adelaide; 500 km (310 mi) W of Port Augusta; 118 km (73 mi) W of Ceduna
- Established: 10 July 1890 (town); 8 February 2001 (locality)

Government
  - State electorate: Flinders
  - Federal division: Grey
- Elevation: 3 m (9.8 ft)

Population
  - Total: 51 (SAL 2016)
- Time zone: UTC+9:30 (ACST)
  - Summer (DST): UTC+10:30 (ACST)
- Postcode: 5690
- County: Hopetoun
- Mean max temp: 21.5 °C (70.7 °F)
- Mean min temp: 12.3 °C (54.1 °F)
- Annual rainfall: 300.2 mm (11.82 in)
Localities around Fowlers Bay
Yalata	Yalata	Yalata; Mitchidy Moola
Coorabie	Fowlers Bay	Mitchidy Moola; Bookabie
Great Australian Bight	Great Australian Bight	Great Australian Bight
- Locations; Adjoining localities

Fowlers Bay, formerly known as Yalata, is a bay, town and locality in the Australian state of South Australia located about 917 kilometres (570 mi) north-west of the state capital, Adelaide. The town is located on Port Eyre, at the western end of the larger Fowlers Bay. It was named Yalata after Yalata station, established in the 1860s and stretching from the Nullarbor Plain across to near Streaky Bay on the Eyre Peninsula, whose homestead was located on the hill nearby. The name Yalata now belongs to a small Aboriginal community further west, which was also situated on station land.

Situated on the Nullarbor Plain, Fowlers Bay was once an active port and a gateway to the western reaches of the continent, but fell into decline in the 1960s and 1970s. However a revitalised tourist industry started bringing more tourists to the town from the 1980s onwards. The southern right whales that frequent the Great Australian Bight were a target of whalers in the past, but now bring sightseers. Large sand dunes are prominent on the southern side of the town, and have been migrating to cover parts of the town over the past century.

== History ==
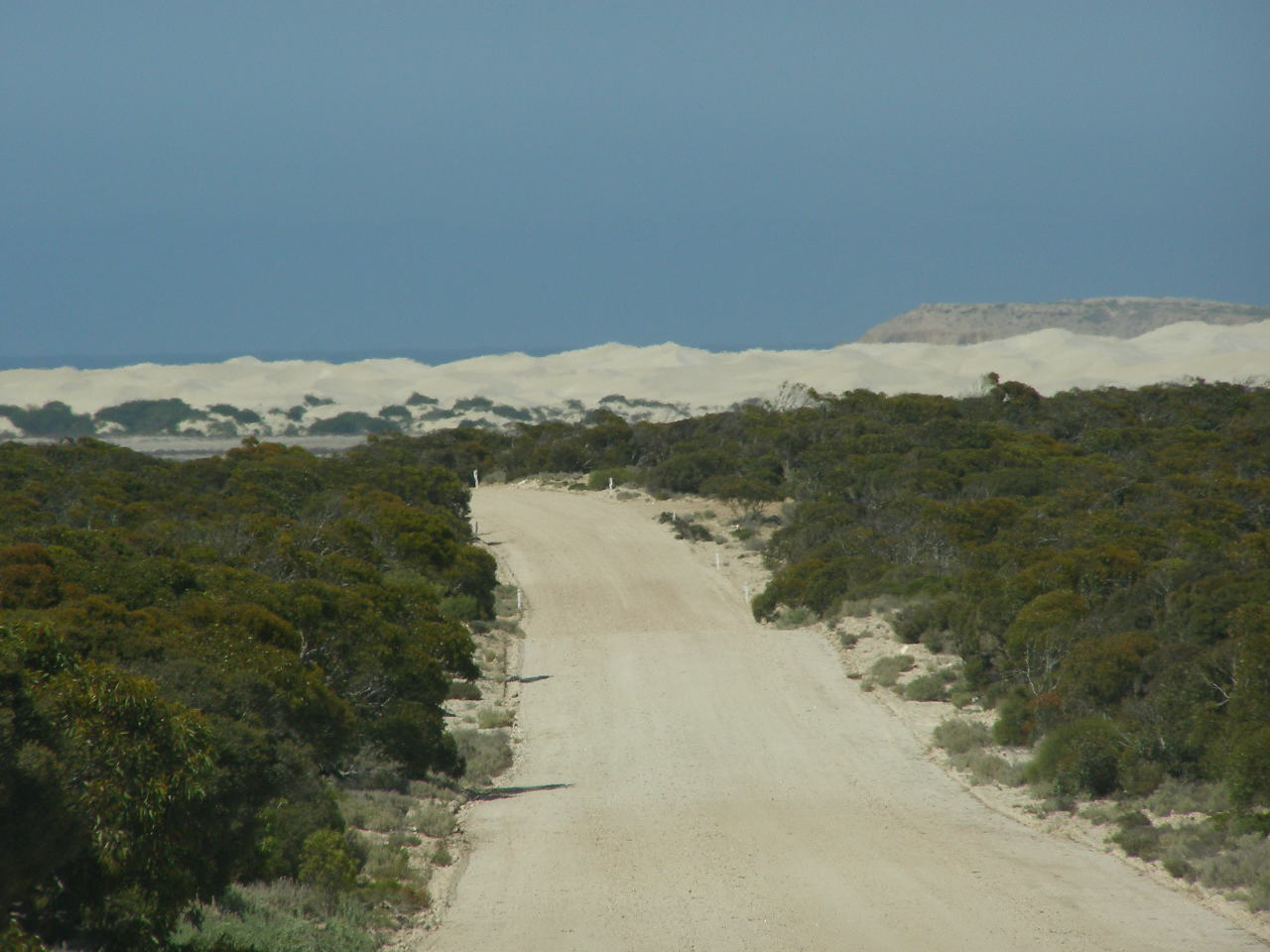
The road to Fowlers Bay

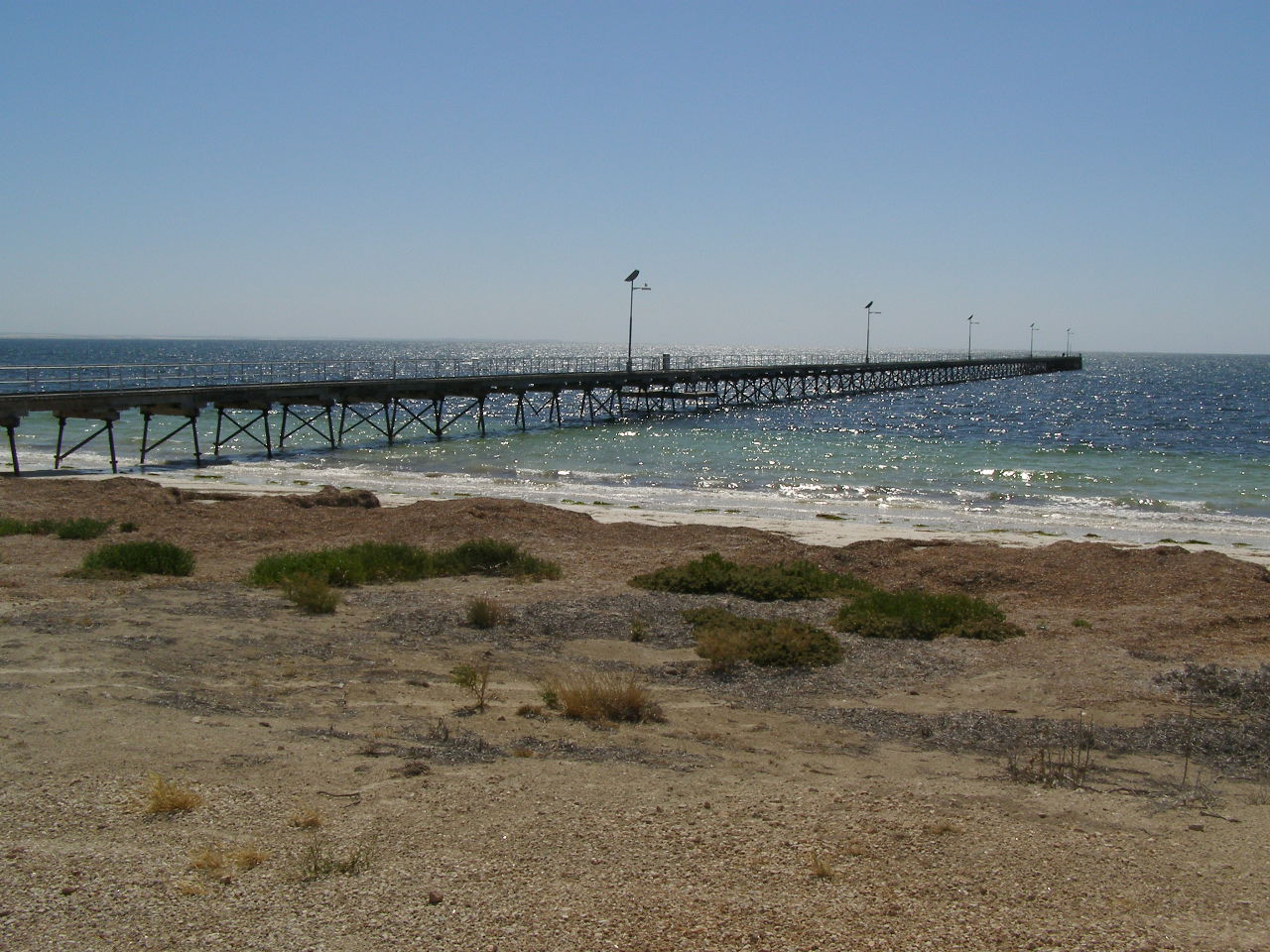
Jetty, Fowlers Bay

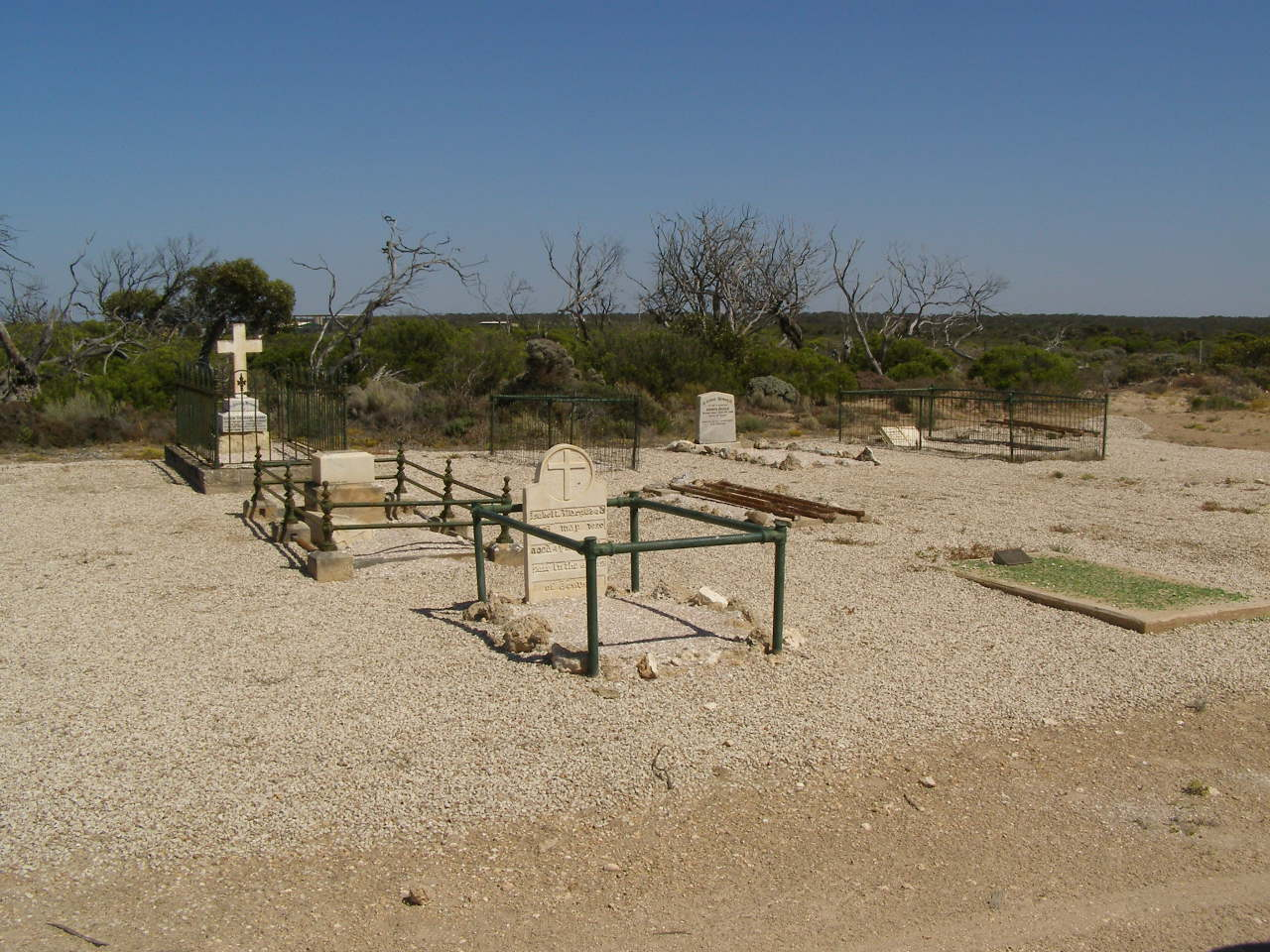
Cemetery, Fowlers Bay

=== Aboriginal connections ===
The town site of Fowlers Bay lies on the traditional lands of the Wirangu people. The Mirning, Kokatha, and Maralinga Tjarutja people, some of whom lived at the Yalata Mission during the 1950s after being displaced, also have spiritual connections to the country. The Mirning people have dreaming stories connected with the whales, in which the people call the whales from the edges of the bight.

The word yalata is said to be from an Aboriginal language, meaning "oyster place" (or "shellfish"). (Note: Yatala Reef lies off Fowlers Bay, named after the Yatala, a schooner used to deliver supplies to the west coast in the late 1830s and early 1840s.)

=== European exploration ===
The coastline around Fowlers Bay was first mapped in 1627 by François Thijssen, a Dutch sea captain, on his ship 't Gulden Zeepard (Golden Seahorse). The bay was named on 28 January 1802 by Matthew Flinders after his first lieutenant, Robert Fowler, as he was reconfirming the Dutch mapping of the coast and naming features along the way, in the Investigator. He found a couple of islands charted by Thijssen and named the group Nuyts Archipelago.

Edward John Eyre set up base camp here from November 1840 during his epic journeys across the Nullarbor Plain, receiving supplies at Eyre's Landing. By this time the area was well known to American and French whaling ships; Eyre documents seeing whalers in the area. A government ship landed at the bay to bring him supplies.

Whaling ships visited the port in the 1800s, and whales were brought onto the beach for processing.

=== Settlement and naming ===
In the 1860s, the first pastoral leases were established by William Swan and Robert Barr Smith, forming Yalata station (they called it Yatala run), a farming property whose boundaries extended from the Head of the Bight (Nullarbor Plain) in the west to Point Brown near Streaky Bay in the east. The station's first buildings were on the beach at Port Eyre. The 5,000 ha (12,000-acre) sheep station's homestead, now a ruin, was built in 1880 on a high hill around 10 km (6.2 mi) inland from Fowlers Bay. The huge sheep station ran up to 120,000 sheep at times.

An unofficial post office was opened in 1865, and the first three postmasters were also policemen. The town was first surveyed in 1867, and resurveyed in March 1890 and proclaimed as the "Town of Yalata" on 10 July 1890. The Nomenclature Committee recommended its renaming to "Tarombo", the name used by local Aboriginal people for a nearby well, to avoid confusion, but its name was changed to Fowler's Bay on 19 September 1940 to agree with the bay and to prevent dual naming. (Yalata now refers to a nearby township.)

=== Telegraph line and expansion ===
From 1875 to 1877, three sections of the East-West Telegraph Line were built: from Port Augusta to Port Lincoln; from there to Fowlers Bay, and from Fowlers Bay to near the WA border at Eucla. The third section was undertaken by the Posts and Telegraph Department itself and supervised by R. R. Knuckey. A supply base was built at Fowlers Bay to provide equipment and provisions along the line, and the line between Adelaide and Perth became operational on 8 December 1877, spanning 1,986 mi (3,196 km).

Sometime in the late 19th century a kangaroo hunter named Tom Kent, son of Benjamin Archer Kent, after whom the Adelaide suburb of Kent Town is named, created a cluster of cottages which was informally named "Kent Town". The families of fellow hunters lived there, but there were only ruins left by 1892, and all of the houses were later covered by sand (see below).

In 1910–1911 additional allotments were added, bringing the number from 42 to 62 and in 1990, a further ten allotments were created from reclaimed samphire swampland.

In 1927 the telegraph line was closed, and in 1967 the post office was shut down, contributing to the decline of the town. Some houses were abandoned.

=== Renaming ===
Boundaries for the locality of Fowlers Bay which include the town were created on 8 February 2001.

=== Recent upgrades ===
The jetty (built in 1896 and extended in 1907, 1914 and 1948) was upgraded in 2002, with solar lighting added in 2003.

== Location, governance and demographics ==
The town is located on Port Eyre, at the western end of the larger Fowlers Bay.

It is located within the federal Division of Grey, the state electoral district of Flinders and the Pastoral Unincorporated Area of South Australia. In the absence of a local government authority, the community in Fowlers Bay receives municipal services from a state government agency, the Outback Communities Authority.

At the 2016 census, the localities of Fowlers Bay and Coorabie shared a population of 51.

== Facilities and attractions ==
Fowlers Bay does not receive reticulated power or water and there are few services; there are solar panels on every roof, residents use rainwater and water piped from a source in the adjacent sand dune, and manage the town's rubbish themselves.

Visually the town is dominated by large sand dunes on its southern side, which have become higher in recent years. After a very quiet period in the 1960s and 70s, the town has become so popular that over 8,000 visitors stay at the caravan park each year, and numbers are boosted by around the same number of day-trippers who often come to watch the southern right whales in the bay over winter. The old police station and courthouse, dating from 1883, has been converted into holiday apartments.

The ruins of the homestead of the Yalata station can be found several kilometres from the town.

There is a small cemetery on the outskirts of the town.

=== Heritage listings ===
Fowlers Bay contains one place listed on the South Australian Heritage Register, the Whale Bone Area and the Point Fowler Structure.

There are also some other restored historic buildings, such as the courthouse, the Fowlers Bay Institute, and the harbour master's house.

== Climate ==
Fowlers Bay has a cool semi-arid climate (Köppen BSk), with moderating influences from the Great Australian Bight. Summers are typically warm to very warm and almost rainless, although when hot northerly winds from the interior occur extreme heat may result. Winters are pleasant, although often windy, and damp though not wet. Three-fifths of the meagre annual rainfall of around 300 millimetres or 12 inches typically occurs between May and August, but only three months have ever exceeded 115 millimetres or 4.53 inches: June 1890 with 169.1 millimetres (6.66 in), August 1915 with 122.5 millimetres (4.82 in) and May 1956 with 130.8 millimetres (5.15 in). The wettest year has been 1890 with 505.8 millimetres (19.91 in) and the driest 1959 with 89.1 millimetres (3.51 in). The highest recorded temperature was 48.4 °C (119.1 °F) and the lowest −3.2 °C (26.2 °F).

Climate data for Fowlers Bay, South Australia
Month	Jan	Feb	Mar	Apr	May	Jun	Jul	Aug	Sep	Oct	Nov	Dec	Year
Record high °C (°F)	48.4 (119.1)	44.1 (111.4)	42.8 (109.0)	40.0 (104.0)	33.3 (91.9)	28.3 (82.9)	27.2 (81.0)	30.6 (87.1)	38.9 (102.0)	43.3 (109.9)	44.4 (111.9)	46.0 (114.8)	48.4 (119.1)
Mean daily maximum °C (°F)	25.1 (77.2)	24.1 (75.4)	24.2 (75.6)	22.5 (72.5)	20.3 (68.5)	17.8 (64.0)	17.0 (62.6)	18.2 (64.8)	20.3 (68.5)	21.8 (71.2)	23.2 (73.8)	24.0 (75.2)	21.5 (70.7)
Mean daily minimum °C (°F)	17.1 (62.8)	17.0 (62.6)	16.0 (60.8)	13.4 (56.1)	10.3 (50.5)	8.1 (46.6)	6.9 (44.4)	7.6 (45.7)	9.6 (49.3)	11.8 (53.2)	13.9 (57.0)	15.7 (60.3)	12.3 (54.1)
Record low °C (°F)	7.2 (45.0)	2.8 (37.0)	5.0 (41.0)	3.9 (39.0)	−1.1 (30.0)	−3.2 (26.2)	−1.8 (28.8)	−0.6 (30.9)	1.7 (35.1)	0.0 (32.0)	3.9 (39.0)	3.0 (37.4)	−3.2 (26.2)
Average rainfall mm (inches)	8.4 (0.33)	12.3 (0.48)	13.7 (0.54)	21.6 (0.85)	42.0 (1.65)	51.7 (2.04)	43.5 (1.71)	36.1 (1.42)	21.8 (0.86)	20.9 (0.82)	16.5 (0.65)	12.0 (0.47)	300.5 (11.82)
Average rainy days (≥ 0.2 mm)	2.4	2.4	3.6	5.9	9.9	11.5	11.9	10.4	7.1	6.0	4.4	3.3	78.8
Source: Bureau of Meteorology

== See also ==
- Fowlers Bay Conservation Park
