= Cultana Training Area =

Australian Army training area

- Near Port Augusta in Australia
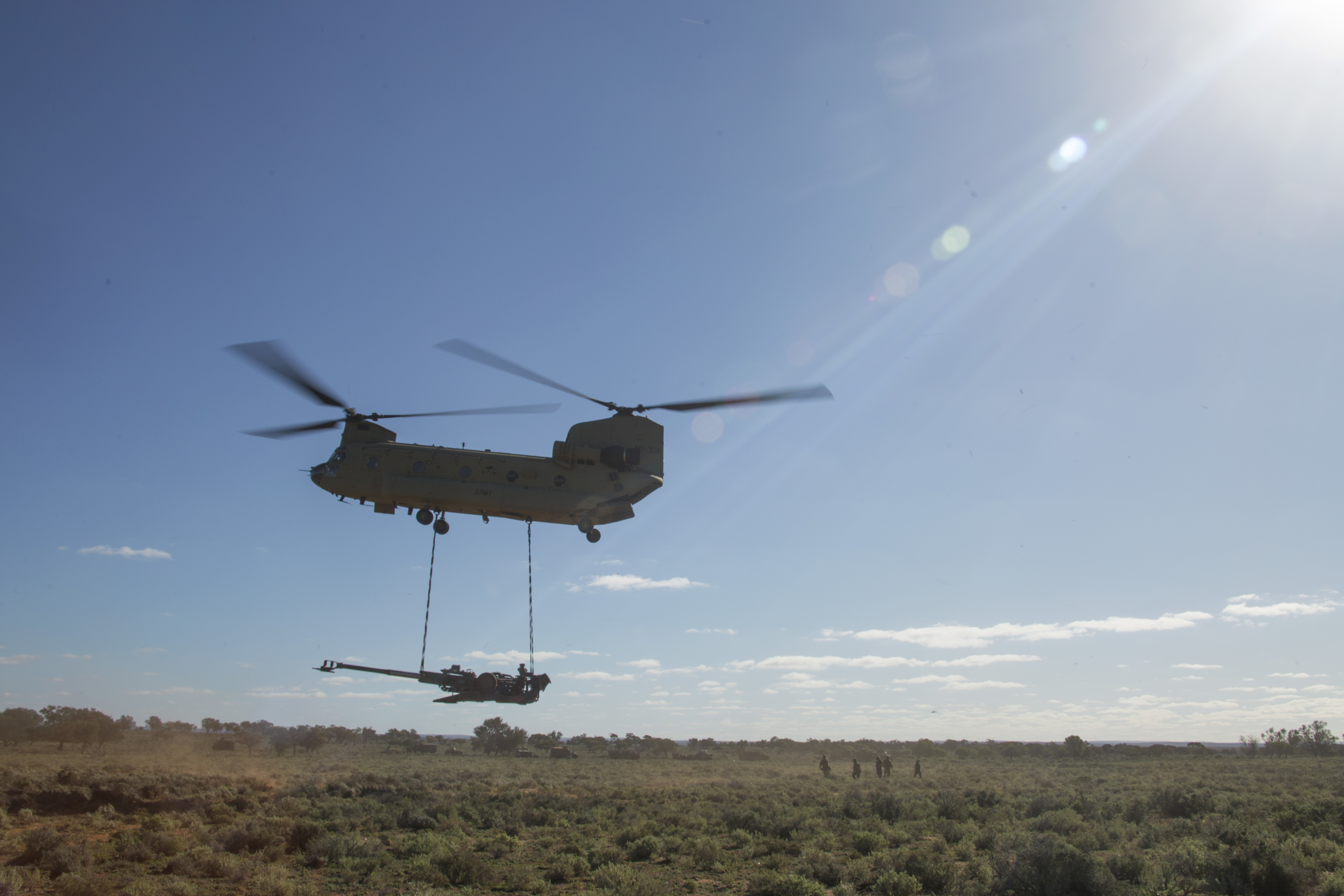
- An Australian Army helicopter lifting a howitzer at Cultana Training Area in 2016

Site information
- Type: Training area
- Owner: Department of Defence (Australia)
- Operator: Australian Army

Location
- Location of Cultana Training Area
- Coordinates: 32°49′00″S 137°45′00″E
- Area: 2,093 square kilometres (808 square miles)

The Cultana Training Area is an Australian Army training area on northeastern Eyre Peninsula in South Australia between Port Augusta, Whyalla and Iron Knob. It includes the former Baxter Detention Centre located at the range head of El Alamein. The training area was enlarged in 2014 to accommodate training needs of 1st Brigade and 7th Battalion, Royal Australian Regiment. The lease of the land (from the Government of South Australia) includes provisions for mining access. It also has an Indigenous land use agreement with the Barngarla people.
