= Outback Communities Authority =

Statutory authority in South Australia

- Local government area
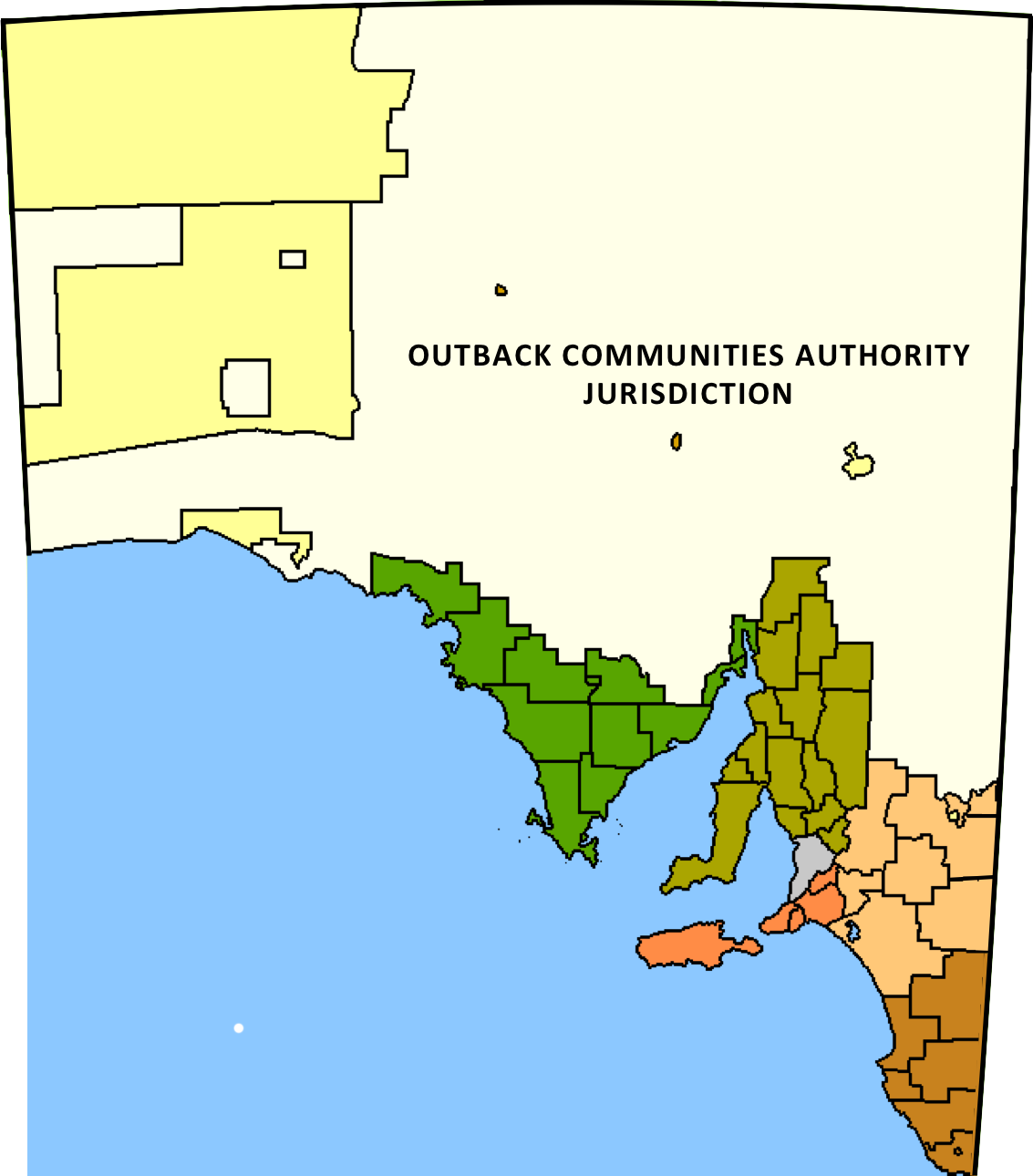
- The extent of the Pastoral Unincorporated Area of South Australia (shown in white)

- Coordinates: 32°29′25″S 137°45′46″E
- Country: Australia
- State: South Australia
- Region: Far North; Eyre and Western
- Established: 2009
- Council seat: Port Augusta; Andamooka

Government
  - Chairperson: Cecilia Woolford
  - State electorate: Giles, Stuart, Flinders
  - Federal division: Grey

Area
  - Total: 624,339.0 km^{2} (241,058.6 sq mi)

Population
  - Total: 3,524 (2016 census)
  - Density: 0.0056444/km^{2} (0.0146188/sq mi)
- Website: Outback Communities Authority
LGAs around Outback Communities Authority
See Surrounding LGAs

The Outback Communities Authority (OCA) is a statutory authority in South Australia (SA) created under the Outback Communities (Administration and Management) Act 2009. It has been established to "manage the provision of public services and facilities to outback communities" which are widely dispersed across the Pastoral Unincorporated Area which covers almost 60% of South Australia's land area. The authority has its seat at both Port Augusta which is located outside the unincorporated area and at Andamooka. The authority serves an area of 624,339 square kilometres (241,059 square miles), slightly smaller than France. The area has a population of 3,750, of whom 639 are Indigenous Australians, and includes several large pastoral leases and mining operations.

The authority's area of responsibility does not include Aboriginal Local Government Areas, the largest of which are Anangu Pitjantjatjara Yankunytjatjara in the northwest of SA and Maralinga Tjarutja in the west of SA.

== History ==
Wangkangurru (also known as Arabana/Wangkangurru, Wangganguru, Wanggangurru, Wongkangurru) is an Australian Aboriginal language spoken on Wangkangurru country. It is closely related to Arabana language of South Australia. The Wangkangurru language region was traditionally in the South Australian-Queensland border region taking in Birdsville and extending south towards Innamincka and Lake Eyre, including the local government areas of the Shire of Diamantina as well as the Outback Communities Authority of South Australia.

Yawarrawarrka (also known as Yawarawarka, Yawarawarga, Yawarawarka, Jauraworka, Jawarawarka) is an Australian Aboriginal language of Far Western Queensland. The traditional language region includes the local government area of the Shire of Diamantina extending into the Outback Communities Authority of South Australia towards Innamincka.

== Outback Areas Community Development Trust ==
The Outback Communities (Administration and Management) Act 2009 established the Outback Communities Authority as the legal successor to the Outback Areas Community Development Trust which had previously been established in 1978 under the Outback Areas Community Development Trust Act 1978.

== Organisational structure ==
The authority consists of a board of seven members of which four must be residents of client communities. The board oversees a small team of support staff led by a general manager. As of 2012, support staff consisted of six persons employed full-time with one additional person employed part-time.

== Client communities ==
As of 2014, the authority provided services to the following communities: Andamooka, Beltana, Blinman, Border Village, Cockburn, Coorabie, Copley, Fowlers Bay, Glendambo, Innamincka, Iron Knob, Kingoonya, Leigh Creek, Lyndhurst, Marla, Mannahill, Marree, Oodnadatta, Parachilna, Penong, Pimba, William Creek, Woomera and Yunta.

== Surrounding LGAs ==
Because of the size of the Pastoral Unincorporated Area of South Australia, the authority provides services in an area bounded by a large number of local government areas (LGAs), 29 in total, both in South Australia and in the adjoining jurisdictions of New South Wales, the Northern Territory, Queensland and Western Australia. Its service area also completely surrounds the Municipal Council of Roxby Downs and the District Council of Coober Pedy. The following LGAs, which border the unincorporated area, total 27 with 17 being in South Australia:

== Citations and references ==
=== References ===
- Outback Communities Authority (OCA) Annual Report 2011–12 (PDF). Government of South Australia. 2013. Archived from the original (PDF) on 15 October 2014.
