= Cape Blanche =

Headland in South Australia

- Coordinates: 33°01′05″S 134°08′24″E
- Country: Australia
- State: South Australia
- LGA: District Council of Streaky Bay
- Location: 25 km (16 mi) south south-west of Streaky Bay
- Elevation: 94 m (308 ft)

Cape Blanche is a headland located on the west coast of the Eyre Peninsula in South Australia, about 25 kilometres (16 miles) south-south-west of the town of Streaky Bay and about 4 kilometres (2.5 miles) west of the town of Sceale Bay. The headland rises to an elevation of 94 metres and overlooks the waters of the Great Australian Bight.

== History ==
The coastline in the vicinity of Cape Blanche was first charted by Matthew Flinders on 9 February 1802 during his circumnavigation of Australia aboard HMS Investigator. Flinders did not name the cape, possibly because the coastline was obscured by a thick haze at the time of his passage.

The cape was subsequently named during the governorship of Richard Graves MacDonnell, the sixth Governor of South Australia (1855–1862). It is reported as being one of sixteen geographic features in South Australia named after Blanche Ann Skurray, MacDonnell's wife. Other features named for Lady MacDonnell include Blanchetown on the Murray River and Blanche Port, the inner harbour of Streaky Bay.

== Conservation ==
Cape Blanche and its surrounds are protected within two overlapping conservation designations established in 2012.

=== Cape Blanche Conservation Park ===
The cape lies within the Cape Blanche Conservation Park, proclaimed on 9 February 2012 under the National Parks and Wildlife Act 1972. The park was established to protect important breeding habitat for the eastern osprey (Pandion cristatus) and white-bellied sea eagle (Haliaeetus leucogaster), as well as a diverse range of flora including the West Coast mintbush (Prostanthera calycina). The park also provides habitat for threatened shorebirds and migratory birds, including the hooded plover (Thinornis rubricollis), sooty oystercatcher (Haematopus fuliginosus), and sanderling (Calidris alba).

=== West Coast Bays Marine Park ===
The waters adjoining the cape's shoreline lie within a sanctuary zone of the West Coast Bays Marine Park, also established in 2012. The marine park's sanctuary zones protect exposed cliff shoreline, heavy limestone or calcarenite reef habitats, and seagrass meadows that serve as nursery areas for fish and invertebrate species.

== See also ==
- Sceale Bay, South Australia
- Slade Point (South Australia)
- Cape Blanche Conservation Park
