= Eba Anchorage, South Australia =

Eba Anchorage
- Suburb
- Coordinates: 32°41′19″S 134°17′38″E
- Country: Australia
- State: South Australia
- Region: Eyre Western
- LGA: District Council of Streaky Bay
- Location: 469 km (291 mi) NW of Adelaide; 14 km (8.7 mi) NE of Streaky Bay
- Established: 12 April 2001

Government
  - State electorate: Flinders
  - Federal division: Grey

Population
  - Total: 25 (SAL 2021)
- Time zone: UTC+9:30 (ACST)
  - Summer (DST): UTC+10:30 (ACST)
- Postcode: 5680
- County: Robinson
- Mean max temp: 23.1 °C (73.6 °F)
- Mean min temp: 12.2 °C (54.0 °F)
- Annual rainfall: 378.0 mm (14.88 in)
Suburbs around Eba Anchorage
Streaky Bay (body of water)	Perlubie	Perlubie
Streaky Bay (body of water)	Eba Anchorage	Piednippie
Streaky Bay (body of water)	Streaky Bay	Piednippie
- Locations; Adjoining localities

Eba Anchorage is a locality in the Australian state of South Australia located in the state's west on the eastern shore of Streaky Bay on the west coast of the Eyre Peninsula about 469 kilometres (291 mi) north-west of the state capital of Adelaide and about 14 kilometres (8.7 mi) north-east of the municipal seat of Streaky Bay.

Boundaries for the locality were created on 12 April 2001 and include the former Eba Island Shack Site. Its name is of local origin.

Eba Anchorage is located between the coastline of Streaky Bay in the west and the alignment of the Flinders Highway in the east. It overlooks the following two islands that are located immediately west of the coastline - Eba and Pigface Islands which respectively have an area of 121 hectares (300 acres) and 2 hectares (4.9 acres).

In 2025 Anchored at Eba an Off-Grid eco retreat was established in the township of Eba Anchorage becoming its first exclusive private holiday accommodation.The property offers self-contained accommodation for families, couples, and travellers seeking a coastal base to explore the region of Streaky Bay and the Eyre Peninsula. Built to operate by the sun, 100% solar powered, this unique property incorporates a sustainability-focused design and infrastructure intended to minimise environmental impact and footprint.

The absence of artificial lighting in the area results in low night-time light pollution, which supports natural wildlife behaviours and makes the area suitable for wildlife observation and stargazing.

Eba Anchorage is a coastal locality on the Eyre Peninsula in South Australia. This entire township operating 100% Off-grid with no mains power or water the residents rely on solar and rainwater. Also recognised for its relatively undisturbed marine and coastal environments. The area supports diverse coastal vegetation and provides habitat for a range of marine and terrestrial wildlife. The surrounding waters are frequented by Australian sea lions and dolphins, while pelicans and other seabirds are commonly observed along the shoreline. The coastal dunes and nearby scrubland support native fauna including kangaroos and reptiles, contributing to the area’s significance for birdwatching and nature-based recreation.

Eba Island, located offshore from Eba Anchorage, is part of a coastal marine environment and conservation park with ecological importance on the Eyre Peninsula. The island and surrounding waters provide habitat for marine wildlife, including Australian sea lions and dolphins, and serve as resting and feeding grounds for seabirds such as pelicans. Native coastal vegetation contributes to shoreline stability and biodiversity, while the broader area supports a range of terrestrial species, including reptiles and kangaroos on nearby mainland areas. The island and adjacent coastline are valued for wildlife observation and birdwatching.

The 2016 Australian census which was conducted in August 2016 reports that Eba Anchorage had a population of 33 people.

Eba Anchorage is located within the federal division of Grey, the state electoral district of Flinders and the local government area of the District Council of Streaky Bay.
