= Perlubie, South Australia =

Perlubie South Australia
- Coordinates: 32°36′36″S 134°20′42″E
- Population: 45 (SAL 2021)
- Established: 12 April 2001
- Postcode(s): 5680
- Elevation: 1 m (3 ft)
- Time zone: ACST (UTC+9:30)
  - Summer (DST): ACDT (UTC+10:30)
- Location: 472 km (293 mi) NW of Adelaide; 24 km (15 mi) NE of Streaky Bay
- LGA(s): District Council of Streaky Bay
- Region: Eyre Western
- County: Robinson
- State electorate(s): Flinders
- Federal division(s): Grey
Mean max temp	Mean min temp	Annual rainfall
23.1 °C; 74 °F	12.2 °C; 54 °F	377.8 mm 14.9 in
Localities around Perlubie:
Streaky Bay (body of water)	Haslam; Petina	Petina
Streaky Bay (body of water)	Perlubie	Chilpenunda
Streaky Bay (body of water)	Eba Anchorage; Piednippie	Chilpenunda
- Footnotes: Locations; Adjoining localities

Perlubie is a locality in the Australian state of South Australia located on the west coast of Eyre Peninsula about 472 kilometres (293 mi) north-west of the state capital of Adelaide and about 24 kilometres (15 mi) north-east of the municipal seat of Streaky Bay.

== History ==
Perlubie was selected as the name of the locality whose boundaries were created in April 2001. The name is derived from places within the locality such as Perlubie Hut and Perlubie Well. The word 'Perlubie" is reported to be of Aboriginal origins and to mean "white sand hill". Despite having identical names, Perlubie is not associated with the Hundred of Perlubie as it is located in the Hundred of Finlayson.

== Governance ==
Perlubie is located within the federal division of Grey, the state electoral district of Flinders and the local government area of the District Council of Streaky Bay.

== Perlubie Beach ==
Perlubie Beach is a beach located in the south-western corner of Perlubie on the coast of a cove overlooking both Streaky Bay and Eba Island.

It has become renowned on the Eyre Peninsula for its unique New Year's Day Race Meet on the beach. The race is a 1600 m event along the beach at low tide and dates back to 1913, when the first race was held. The sea weathered stands and saddling enclosures are among the only notable historical structures in the area, used solely for the New Year's Eve Race meet.

A sports day is typically held the following day, 1 January, with buses running from the Streaky Bay Caravan Park to the beach.

Access to the beach runs through private property at the current time.

Although a remote area, a number of lots have recently been sold and development is expected to occur soon.
