= Slade Point (South Australia) =

- Coordinates: 33°03′19″S 134°10′06″E
- Country: Australia
- State: South Australia
- City: Sceale Bay
- Location: 29 km (18 mi) south of Streaky Bay

Slade Point is a headland in the Australian state of South Australia located on the west coast of Eyre Peninsula in the locality of Sceale Bay about 29 kilometres (18 mi) south of the town of Streaky Bay. The point is the northern extremity of Searcy Bay and the southern extremity of a promontory that separates Searcy Bay in the south east from Sceale Bay in the north west. While it is within the coastline first charted by Matthew Flinders on 9 February 1802, it is not named by Flinders possibly due to the coastline being obscured by a thick haze. Slade Point was named in 1908 after “the late Mr. W. E. Slade” who served as the Assistant Engineer of Harbours in the South Australian Government. The cape has adjoined the boundary of the Cape Blanche Conservation Park since 2012 while the waters adjoining its shoreline have been within a habitat protection zone in the West Coast Bays Marine Park also since 2012.
