= Calca, South Australia =

Calca South Australia
- Coordinates: 33°01′35″S 134°21′40″E
- Population: 13 (SAL 2021)
- Established: 12 April 2001
- Postcode(s): 5671
- Time zone: ACST (UTC+9:30)
  - Summer (DST): ACST (UTC+10:30)
- Location: 444 km (276 mi) W of Adelaide; 30 km (19 mi) SE of Streaky Bay
- LGA(s): District Council of Streaky Bay
- Region: Eyre Western
- County: Robinson
- State electorate(s): Flinders
- Federal division(s): Grey
Mean max temp	Mean min temp	Annual rainfall
23.1 °C; 74 °F	12.2 °C; 54 °F	378.0 mm 14.9 in
Localities around Calca:
Sceale Bay	Yanerbie; Mortana	Mortana
Sceale Bay; Baird Bay (body of water)	Calca	Mortana; Tyringa
Baird Bay (body of water)	Baird Bay	Tyringa
- Footnotes: Locations; Adjoining localities

Calca is a small township around 20 kilometres (12 mi) south-east of Streaky Bay, on the southern border of the Calpatanna Waterhole Conservation Park, Eyre Peninsula.

The land was occupied by James Baird (for whom nearby Baird Bay was named), calling it "Kolka" (Aboriginal for 'stars'). Baird, also referred to as Henry Baird, was killed by Aborigines in 1850. A pastoral lease was held by Adam Borthwick from 10 February 1856 (lease no. 554).

The postcode for Calca is 5671.

The 2016 Australian census which was conducted in August 2016 reports that Calca had a population of 9 people.

Calca is located within the federal division of Grey, the state electoral district of Flinders and the local government area of the District Council of Streaky Bay.

== See also ==
- Calpatanna Waterhole Conservation Park
