= Piednippie =

Locality on Eyre Peninsula in South Australia

Piednippie South Australia
- Coordinates: 32.74°S 134.41°E
- Population: 16 (SAL 2021)
- Postcode(s): 5680
- Location: 20 km (12 mi) northeast of Streaky Bay
- LGA(s): District Council of Streaky Bay
- State electorate(s): Flinders
- Federal division(s): Grey
Localities around Piednippie:
Perlubie		Chilpenunda
Eba Anchorage	Piednippie	Chandada
Streaky Bay	Maryvale

Piednippie is a locality on the west coast of Eyre Peninsula in South Australia. Its boundaries were established in April 2001 for the long-established name.

The foundation stone for the stone Piednippie Hall was laid in November 1933. The locality had a school and cricket club. The locality still has an active hall and tennis club, and a Catholic cemetery. Piednippie was one of two home grounds (with Streaky Bay) for the West Coast Hawks in the Mid West Football League until 2020 but when the league wound up, the Hawks only use the Streaky Bay oval.
