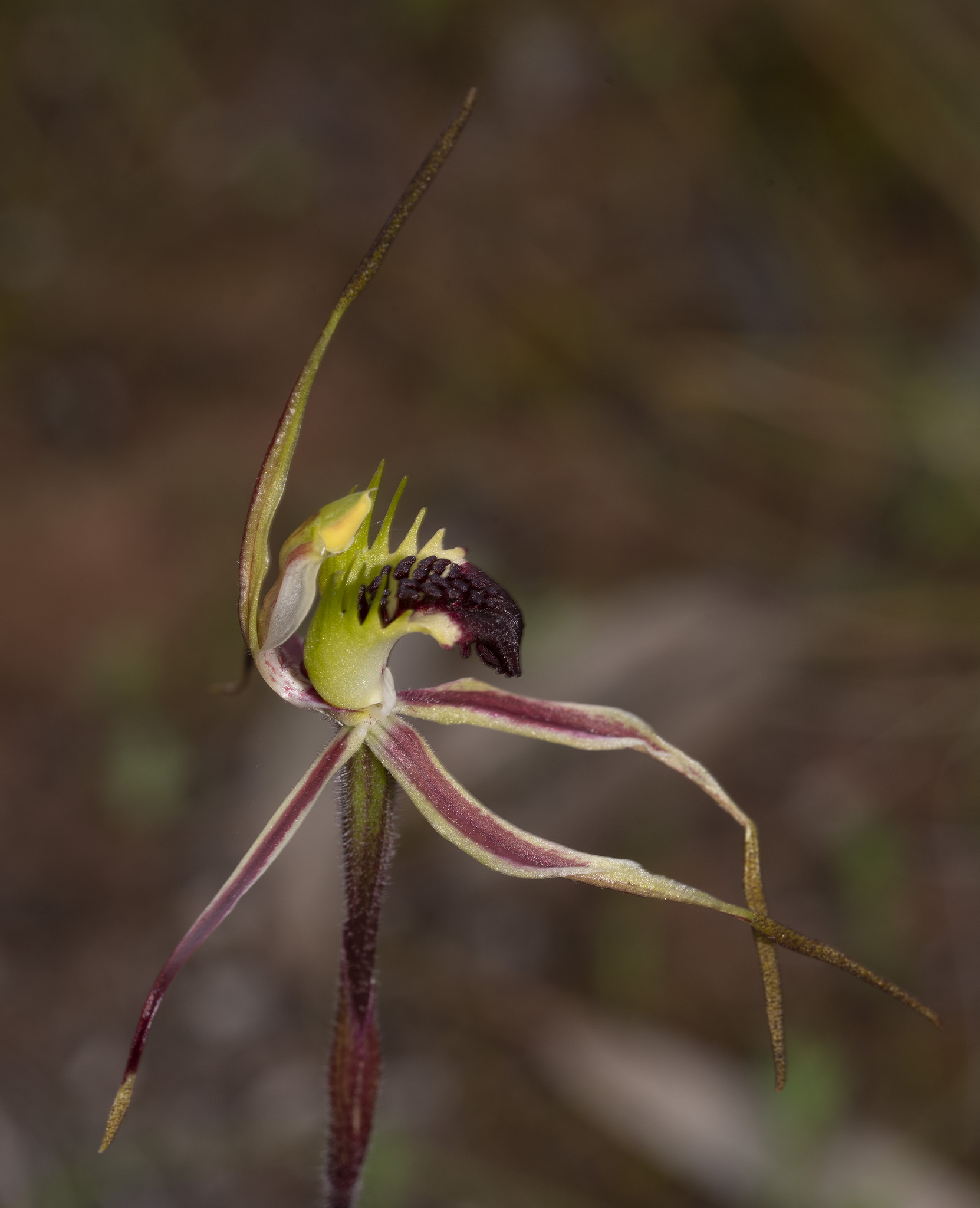
- In Port Lincoln Tourist Park

Scientific classification
- Kingdom: Plantae
- Clade: Tracheophytes
- Clade: Angiosperms
- Clade: Monocots
- Order: Asparagales
- Family: Orchidaceae
- Subfamily: Orchidoideae
- Tribe: Diurideae
- Genus: Caladenia
- Species: C. bruniella

Binomial name
- Caladenia bruniella (R.J.Bates) R.J.Bates

Synonyms
- Arachnorchis bruniella R.J.Bates; Arachnorchis sp. 'Small brown bayonets'; Arachnorchis sp. Brown bayonets (R.Bates 59762) R.J.Bates; Pterostylis bruniella (R.J.Bates) J.M.H.Shaw

= Caladenia bruniella =

Species of orchid

Caladenia bruniella is a species of flowering plant in the orchid family Orchidaceae and is endemic to the south of South Australia. It is a small, clumping orchid with a single hairy leaf, and usually a single cream-coloured, green, maroon and chocolate-coloured flower with red markings on a hairy stalk 12–18 mm (0.47–0.71 in) long.

== Description ==
Caladenia bruniella is a small, terrestrial, hairy, herb with an underground tuber that sometimes grows in clumps of 2 to 6 plants. It has a single, hairy, linear to oblong leaf, 40–120 mm (1.6–4.7 in) long, 4–9 mm (0.16–0.35 in) wide and green above, red on the lower surface. A single cream-coloured, green, maroon and chocolate-coloured flower is borne on a rigid, hairy flowering spike, 12–18 mm (0.47–0.71 in) tall. The sepals and petals are lance-shaped, 20–30 mm (0.79–1.18 in) long and cream-coloured to pale yellow, with a broad, central maroon stripe. The dorsal sepal is rigidly erect, up to 20 mm (0.79 in) long and the lateral sepals spread in front of the flower, up to 30 mm (1.2 in) long and 3 mm (0.12 in) wide with glands that are longer than on the dorsal sepal. The petals are smaller than the sepals, up to 20 mm (0.79 in) long and 1.0–1.5 mm (0.039–0.059 in) wide. The labellum has 3 lobes and is cream-coloured, green and maroon, 10–12 mm (0.39–0.47 in) long and wide. The throat of the labellum is cream-coloured with a few red marks and lines, the middle lobe is deep maroon with the tip rolled under, the mid-section with 4 or 5 bright green, erect teeth up to 2 mm (0.079 in) long. There are 4 to 6 irregular rows of calli along the centre of the labellum. Flowering occurs from September to October.

== Taxonomy and naming ==
This species of orchid was first formally described in 2016 by Robert John Bates who gave it the name Arachnorchis bruniella in Australian Orchid Research from specimens he collected at Snook Landing, Port Lincoln in 2013. In 2016, Bates transferred the species to Caladenia as C. bruniella in a later edition of Australian Orchid Review. The specific epithet (bruniella) is from a Latin word meaning 'little brown', referring to the glands on the sepals.

== Distribution and habitat ==
This caladenia grows in fertile soils in low mallee and under native Callitris between Venus Bay, the Calpattana Waterhole near Sceale Bay, and the hills near Port Pirie, and usually no more than 20 km (12 mi) from the coast.
