= Calpatanna Waterhole Conservation Park =

Protected area in South Australia

- IUCN category Ia (strict nature reserve)
- Location within South Australia
- Location: South Australia
- Nearest city: Streaky Bay
- Coordinates: 32°59′39″S 134°20′32″E
- Area: 36.44 km^{2} (14.07 sq mi)
- Established: 14 February 1974
- Governing body: Department for Environment and Water
- Website: https://www.environment.sa.gov.au/parks/Find_a_Park/Browse_by_region/Eyre_Peninsula/calpatanna-waterhole-conservation-park

Calpatanna Waterhole Conservation Park is a protected area in the Australian state of South Australia located on the Eyre Peninsula in the gazetted localities of Calca, Mortana and Yanerbie about 25 kilometres (16 mi) south-east of the town centre in Streaky Bay.

The conservation park was proclaimed on 14 February 1974 under the state’s National Parks and Wildlife Act 1972 in respect to land in sections 121, 122, 128, 129, 144, 179, 180 and 189 in the cadastral unit of the Hundred of Wrenfordsley. Land in sections 248 and 249 was added on 16 July 1985. Its name is derived from the Calpatanna Waterhole which is located within its boundaries. As of July 2016, the conservation park covered an area of 36.44 square kilometres (14.07 sq mi).

In 1980, the conservation park was described as follows:

Calpatanna Waterhole is a moderately large park preserving semi-arid scrub representative of the west coast region of South Australia. The park contains seasonal saline lagoons which enhance the diversity of the flora and fauna represented… The dominant feature of the park is an extensive area of saline lagoons, which fill with the winter rains. Found in association with these areas, Melaleuca halmaturorum tall shrubland forms a major vegetation type in the park. The principal vegetation association however is a mallee scrub of Eucalyptus diversifolia in association with E. socialis, E. gracilis, M. lanceolata and Exocarpus sp… Though it has had some grazing history the park is in good condition and generally representative of the vegetation of the region.

The conservation park is classified as an IUCN Category IA protected area. In 1980, it was listed on the now-defunct Register of the National Estate.

== See also ==
- Protected areas of South Australia
