= William Haslam =

Australian politician

William Haslam (2 April 1850 – 7 May 1898) was a small businessman and politician in the Colony of South Australia.

== History ==
Haslam was born in Bolton, Lancashire, and was a member of the choir and Sunday school at the Wesleyan Methodist church on Bradshawgate. He emigrated to South Australia, arriving on the Glen Osmond on 21 October 1869.

He and his brother James Cyrus Haslam joined the firm of Donaldson, Andrews, and Sharland, working as a warehouseman and traveller, until setting up in business for himself in Jamestown. He then joined his brother James and Mr Wilson to found firm of Haslam Bros. & Wilson. He later returned to Jamestown to run a general store and became active in the life of the town, living at "Unsworth House". He served on the committee of the Jamestown Institute and the Hospital Board. He served on the Council for six years, and was elected mayor in December 1890. When Dr Cockburn was mayor he greatly assisted in planting trees, which became a feature of the town. He was involved in a scheme to put working men on blocks subdivided from the Bundaleer Forest Reserve. He disposed of his business and moved to the city around 1885, living at "Woodlands" then "Heywood", both in Unley Park and working for Globe Timber Mills, the company founded by his brother-in-law Simon Harvey (1843–23 September 1927), and in which he had a considerable interest. He was an active member and trustee of the Unley Wesleyan Church, and superintendent of the Sunday-school. He was active in the Discharged Prisoners' Aid Association.

He died following an apoplectic fit.

== Politics ==
In 1891, he was elected by the North-east district to the Legislative Council, a position he held until his death in 1898. He was an effective speaker; he was a moderate protectionist, but was not in favour of taxing essentials. He supported free education, progressive taxation and Federation. He had been appointed to the Aged Poor Commission and the Northern Territory Commission.

== Family ==
Haslam married Annie Jenkyns Roach (c.1851 – 16 February 1929) of Penwortham on 24 June 1873; they had three daughters (Mabel, Olive and Daisy) and four sons (Albert, William Osborne, Leslie and Spencer). Albert worked for the business until he moved to New Zealand. William Osborne (usually known as Osborne Haslam) worked the family timber business throughout his career.

William was a brother of Rev. James Haslam (c.1843 – 7 September 1910), and John Cyrus Haslam (c.1848 – 12 September 1917) of Port Pirie (and the mayor 1895–1897). His sister Elizabeth Annie (c.1852 – 31 March 1898) married his business partner Simon Harvey.

== Legacy ==
Haslam, a fishing village on the West Coast of South Australia, 45 km north-west of Streaky Bay was named for him in 1893. After his death, a part of his property Heywood was purchased by the City of Unley and became a public reserve known as Heywood Park. It was officially opened in 1921.
