= Mortana, South Australia =

Mortana
- Suburb
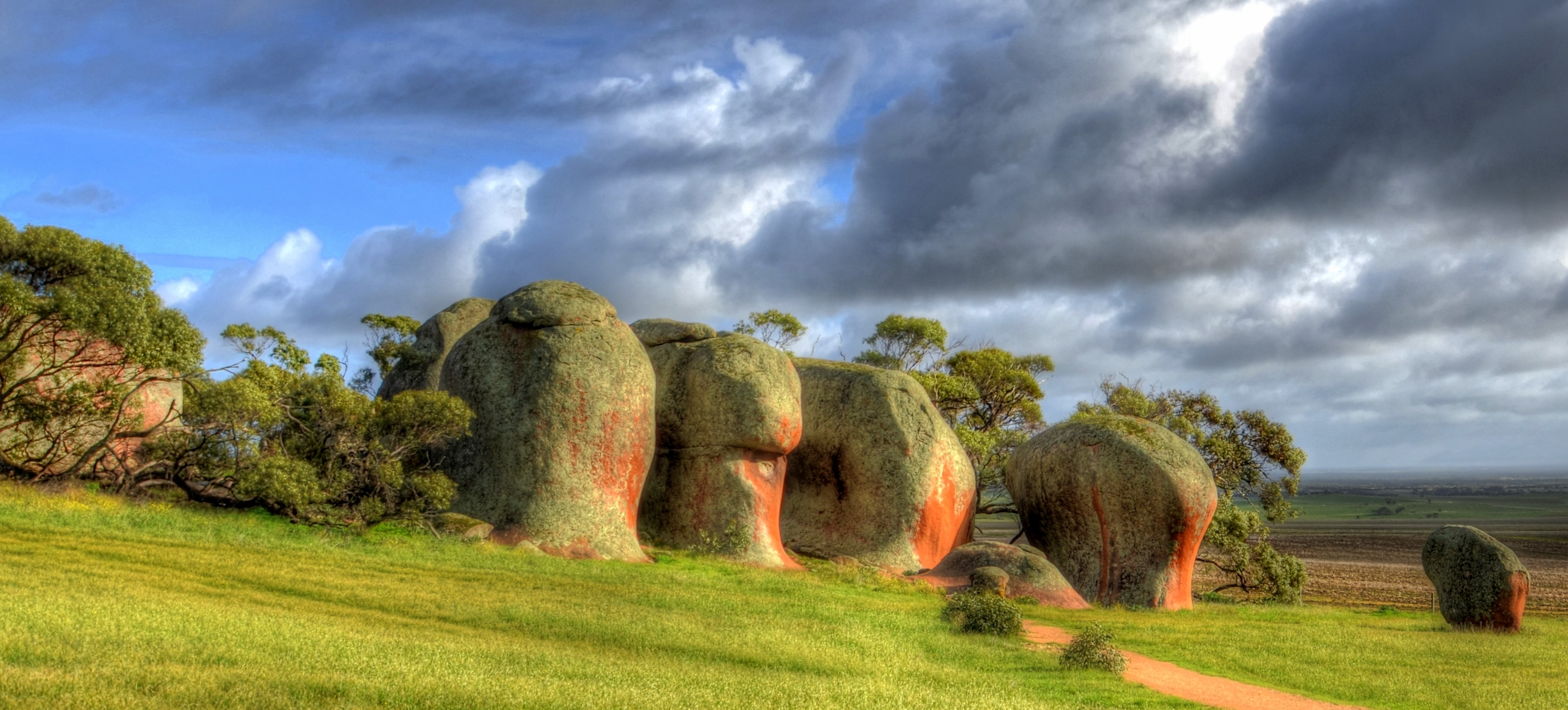

- Coordinates: 33°01′41″S 134°27′11″E
- Country: Australia
- State: South Australia
- Region: Eyre Western
- LGA: District Council of Streaky Bay
- Location: 35 km (22 mi) southeast of Streaky Bay
- Established: 12 April 2001

Government
  - State electorate: Flinders
  - Federal division: Grey

Population
  - Total: 23 (SAL 2021)
- Time zone: UTC+9:30 (ACST)
  - Summer (DST): UTC+10:30 (ACST)
- Postcode: 5671
- County: Robinson
- Mean max temp: 23.1 °C (73.6 °F)
- Mean min temp: 12.2 °C (54.0 °F)
- Annual rainfall: 378.0 mm (14.88 in)
Suburbs around Mortana
Streaky Bay; Yanerbie	Streaky Bay; Maryvale	Maryvale; Inkster
Calca	Mortana	Colley
Calca	Tyringa	Colley

Mortana is a rural locality in South Australia, located on the Eyre Peninsula. It is traversed by the Flinders Highway. The boundaries for the locality were established in April 2001 in respect of the long established local name.

Mortana Post Office opened on 2 February 1900 and closed on 31 March 1971. A cricket club once existed there, having been founded in 1912; it also formerly had a school. A railway line to the area was mooted in the 1920s, but did not occur.

The Murphy's Haystacks geological formation is located at Mortana, and forms a local tourist attraction.

The 2016 Australian census which was conducted in August 2016 reports that Mortana had a population of 16 people.

Mortana is located within the federal division of Grey, the state electoral district of Flinders and the local government area of the District Council of Streaky Bay.

== See also ==
- Calpatanna Waterhole Conservation Park
