= Maryvale, South Australia =

Maryvale South Australia
- Coordinates: 32°52′S 134°28′E
- Population: 11 (SAL 2016)
- Postcode(s): 5680
- Location: 24 km (15 mi) east of Streaky Bay
- LGA(s): District Council of Streaky Bay
- State electorate(s): Flinders
- Federal division(s): Grey
Localities around Maryvale:
Piednippie	Piednippie	Chandada
Streaky Bay	Maryvale	Chandada; Inkster
Yanerbie	Mortana	Inkster

Maryvale is a rural locality in the Eyre and Western regions of South Australia. It lies within the District Council of Streaky Bay. The locality was created in April 2001, and was named after the Maryvale Homestead.

The historic Maryvale Station, from which it derives its name, has been in occupation since at least the 1860s; from 1863, it was owned by prominent colonists William Austin Horn and John Morphett. The station complex, including the homestead, school, shearing shed and shearers' quarters, is listed on the South Australian Heritage Register.
