= Hundred of Finlayson =

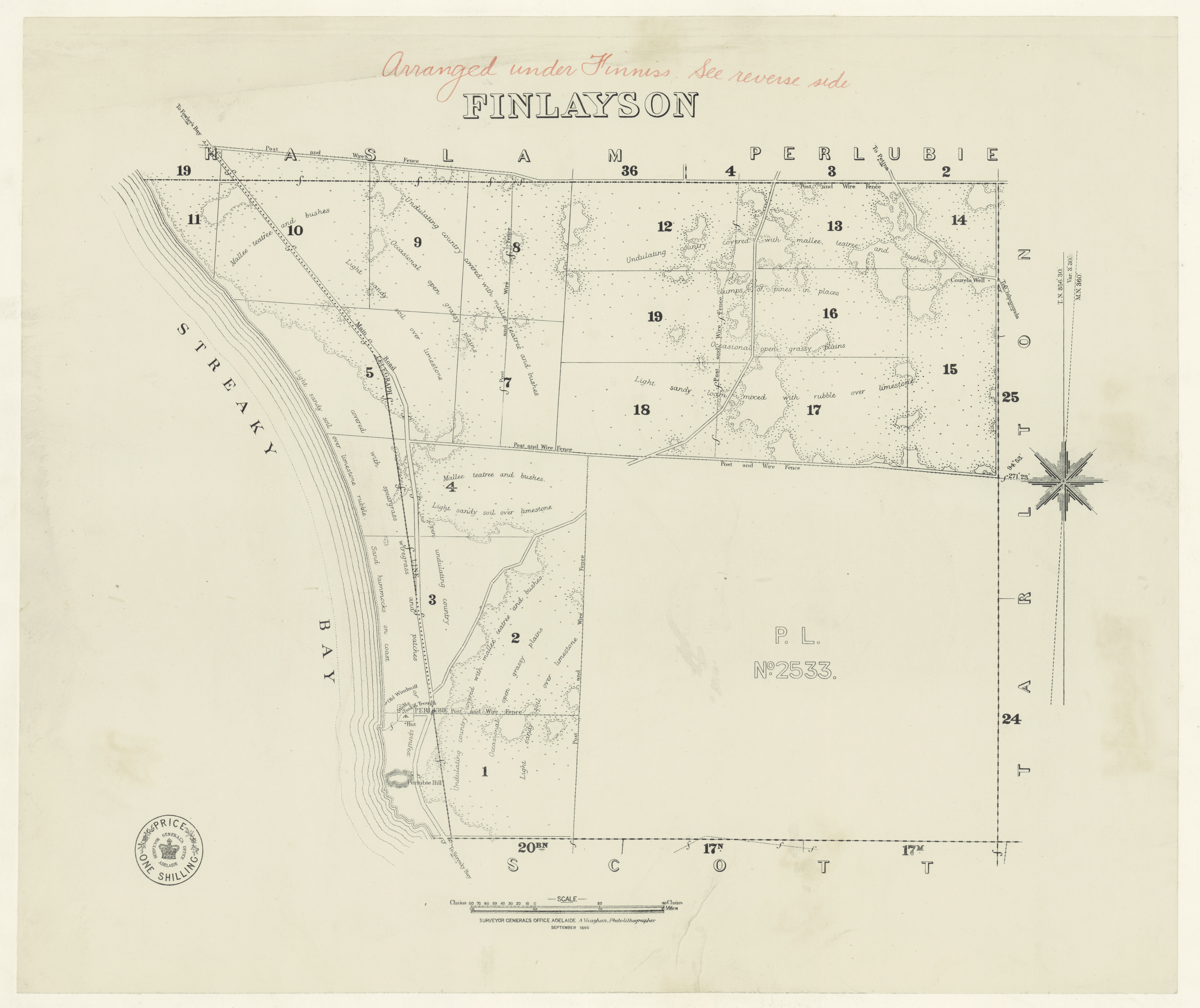
Hundred of Finlayson, 1895

The Hundred of Finlayson is a cadastral hundred of South Australia. The hundred is at 32°36′36.0″S 134°20′42.0″E and main town of the hundred is Perlubie. The local government area is the District Council of Streaky Bay. The post code is 5680.
