= Caratoola Recreation Park =

Protected area in South Australia

- IUCN category III (natural monument or feature)
- Location within South Australia
- Location: South Australia
- Nearest city: Haslam
- Coordinates: 32°29′47.39″S 134°12′48.96″E
- Area: 54 ha (130 acres)
- Established: 24 April 1969
- Governing body: Department for Environment and Water

Caratoola Recreation Park (formerly the Caratoola National Parks Reserve) is a protected area in the Australian state of South Australia located in the locality of Haslam about 0.5 kilometres (0.31 miles) north of the town of Haslam and about 35 kilometres (22 miles) north of the town of Streaky Bay.

The recreation park consists of land in section 53 of the cadastral unit of the Hundred of Haslam. It is bounded by the Haslam Highway to the east and by Watkinson Road to the south. In 1980, it was described as "Mallee tea tree associations on coast".

The land under protection was first proclaimed as the Caratoola National Parks Reserve under the National Parks Act 1966 on 24 April 1969. On 27 April 1972, the national parks reserve was re-proclaimed under the National Parks and Wildlife Act 1972 as the Caratoola Recreation Park.

In 1980, it was nominated for inclusion on the interim list of the now-defunct Register of the National Estate, but was withdrawn by the nominator because of its "small size", "drastically altered natural vegetation" and the "reserve used primarily for community recreation with little or no conservation significance".

In 2012, it was one of several recreation parks listed for re-classification as a conservation park.

It is classified as an IUCN Category III protected area.

== See also ==
- Protected areas of South Australia
