= Haslam, South Australia =

Haslam
- Town
- Coordinates: 32°30′32″S 134°12′47″E
- Country: Australia
- State: South Australia
- Region: Eyre Western
- LGA: District Council of Streaky Bay
- Location: 487 km (303 mi) NW of Adelaide; 32 km (20 mi) N of Streaky Bay
- Established: 9 October 1913 (town); 12 April 2001 (locality)

Government
  - State electorate: Flinders
  - Federal division: Grey
- Elevation: 1 m (3.3 ft)

Population
  - Total: 63 (SAL 2021)
- Time zone: UTC+9:30 (ACST)
  - Summer (DST): UTC+10:30 (ACDT)
- Postcode: 5680
- County: Dufferin
- Mean max temp: 23.1 °C (73.6 °F)
- Mean min temp: 12.2 °C (54.0 °F)
- Annual rainfall: 378.0 mm (14.88 in)
Localities around Haslam
Smoky Bay	Carawa; Petina	Petina
Smoky Bay	Haslam	Petina
Streaky Bay (body of water)	Streaky Bay (body of water); Perlubie	Petina
- Locations; Adjoining localities

Haslam is a town and a locality in the Australian state of South Australia located on the Eyre Peninsula on the coastline of Streaky Bay about 487 kilometres (303 mi) north-west of the state capital of Adelaide and about 32 kilometres (20 mi) north of the municipal seat of Streaky Bay.

Haslam is a common stop off for campers as they make their way across the Nullarbor Plain. The town itself has no major industrial or commercial connections anymore and contains limited resources including a camping ground and the town jetty.

== History ==
Haslam was established in 1893 as a deep sea port reportedly under the name of Port Carawa to allow the shipping of supplies of machinery and food to the local settlers, as well as providing transport of local products to other parts of the state. When road transport took over in the 1960s, this service died out.

The town was proclaimed on 9 October 1913 and takes its name from William Haslam who served as the north-east representative of the South Australian Legislative Council from 1891 to his death in 1898.

Haslam had a post office (originally a receiving office under the name Port Haslam) from 1913. The area is now served by a community postal agency.

The 430 metres (1,410 ft) long town jetty was originally built in 1912 to allow ships access to the coast. It was reduced in length by half in 1972.

The Haslam Township School opened in 1920, before having its name changed to "Maildaburra" in 1921. A new school was built in 1930, and was renamed "Haslam". The school finally closed on the opening of Miltaburra Area School near Wirrulla in 1983, and now serves as a museum.

On 15 March 1934, the area of the town was extended by proclamation to include a "police reserve".

The locality's boundaries which were created on 12 April 2001 includes the government town of Haslam.

== Governance ==
Haslam is located within the federal division of Grey, the state electoral district of Flinders and the local government area of the District Council of Streaky Bay.

== See also ==
- Caratoola Recreation Park
