= Eba Island Conservation Park =

Protected area in South Australia

- IUCN category Ia (strict nature reserve)
- Location within South Australia
- Location: South Australia
- Nearest city: Streaky Bay
- Coordinates: 32°40′40.5″S 134°16′07.1″E
- Area: 134 ha (330 acres)
- Established: 8 December 1966
- Governing body: Department for Environment and Water

Eba Island Conservation Park is a protected area in the Australian state of South Australia. It comprises 134 hectares (330 acres) of land, proclaimed in 1972 to conserve island habitat within Streaky Bay and sea bird breeding colonies. Eba Island is located 700 metres (2,300 feet) offshore and 4 kilometres (2.5 miles) south of Perlubie Hill. It is entirely composed of calcarenite, often overlaid with a limestone capping.

== Nomenclature ==
Eba Island may have been named after a clerk in the South Australian Department of Lands or after an acquaintance of Governor MacDonnell.

== Geography ==
On the south-western, more exposed flanks of the island, waves have undercut the wall and carved blowholes, scalloped ridges and blades of jagged rock into the limestone. On the better-protected northern sides the calcarenite bed is softened by sandy coves, with rock appearing through as headlands.

== Flora and fauna ==
Creeping boobialla (Myoporum parvifolium) is found on Eba Island and is listed under the National Parks and Wildlife Act 1972 as Rare. The island is also infested with the introduced African boxthorn. Red fox tracks have been found on Eba Island. A connecting sandbar at low tide allows terrestrial animals to cross from the mainland to the island.

A species list of flora and fauna can be found in the Island Parks of Western Eyre Peninsula Management Plan.

== History ==
The island was once used for agriculture. An abandoned house and several broken fence lines are testaments to the endeavor's failure. Native vegetation is slowly reclaiming the cleared grasslands. The island was proclaimed a Fauna Reserve in 1966. Eba Island conservation park was constituted by statute in 1972 and is classified as an IUCN Category Ia protected area.

== See also ==
- Protected areas of South Australia
