= Pigface Island Conservation Park =

Protected area in South Australia

- IUCN category Ia (strict nature reserve)
- Location within South Australia
- Location: South Australia
- Nearest city: Streaky Bay
- Coordinates: 32°41′43″S 134°16′42″E/
- Area: 16 ha (40 acres)
- Established: 2 May 1968
- Visitors: 'very few visitors' (in 2006)
- Governing body: Department of Environment, Water and Natural Resources

Pigface Island Conservation Park is a protected area in the Australian state of South Australia associated with Pigface Island located in Streaky Bay on the west coast of Eyre Peninsula about 13 kilometres (8.1 miles) north north-east west of the town of Streaky Bay.

It was proclaimed under the National Parks and Wildlife Act 1972 in 1972 for the purpose of conserving a "sea bird roosting habitat". The land under protection had previously been dedicated as a Fauna Conservation Reserve on 2 May 1968. A statement of significance published in 1980 says that it is: "a small island utilised by silvergulls and black-faced cormorants as a breeding area and by other seabirds as a roosting and feeding habitat".

The conservation park is classified as an IUCN Category Ia protected area. In 1980, the conservation park was listed on the former Register of the National Estate.

== See also ==
- Protected areas of South Australia
