= Heywood Park =

Public park in Unley Park

Coordinates: 34°57′40″S 138°36′04″E

- Interactive map of Heywood Park
- Location: Unley Park, South Australia
- Area: 3.2 hectares (8 acres)
- Opened: 1921
- Owner: City of Unley

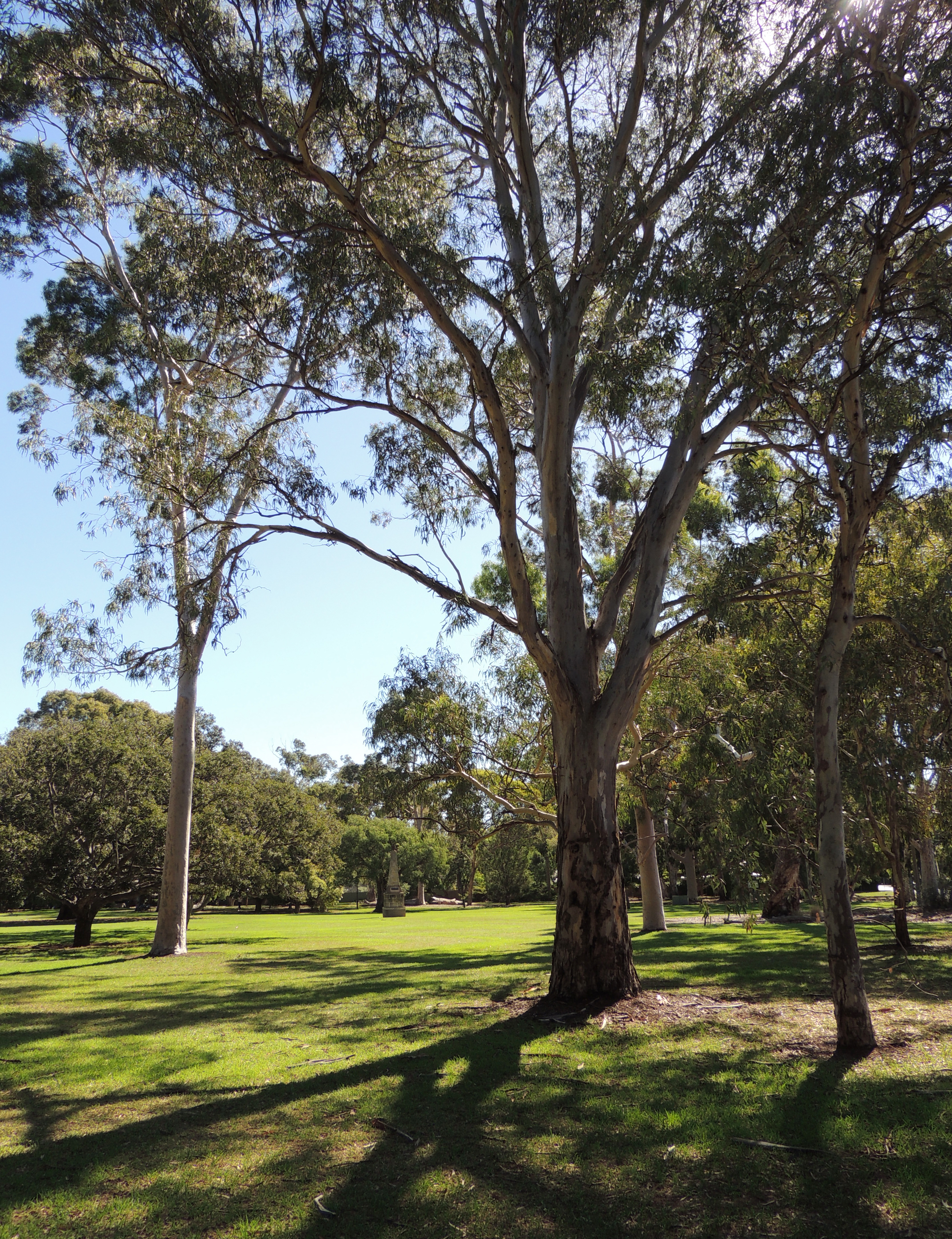
Heywood Park gum trees and lawn, January 2015

Heywood Park is a public park in the suburb of Unley Park in Adelaide, South Australia. It is home to the last remaining grey box gum trees (Eucalyptus microcarpa) on the Adelaide plains, some of which pre-date European settlement. The park takes its name from the place of birth of William Haslam, the property's last private owner; Heywood in Lancashire, England. The City of Unley council purchased the property and it was officially opened to the public on 10 December 1921. Today, the park is popular with families and children, in part due its "huge, magnificent, thick-trunked trees." As of 2014, a number of these have been marked for removal following concerns about falling branches and public safety. Some community members have raised concerns about the tree removals' impact on the park's amenity, wildlife habitat value and cultural significance to the Kaurna people of the Adelaide plains.

== Establishment ==
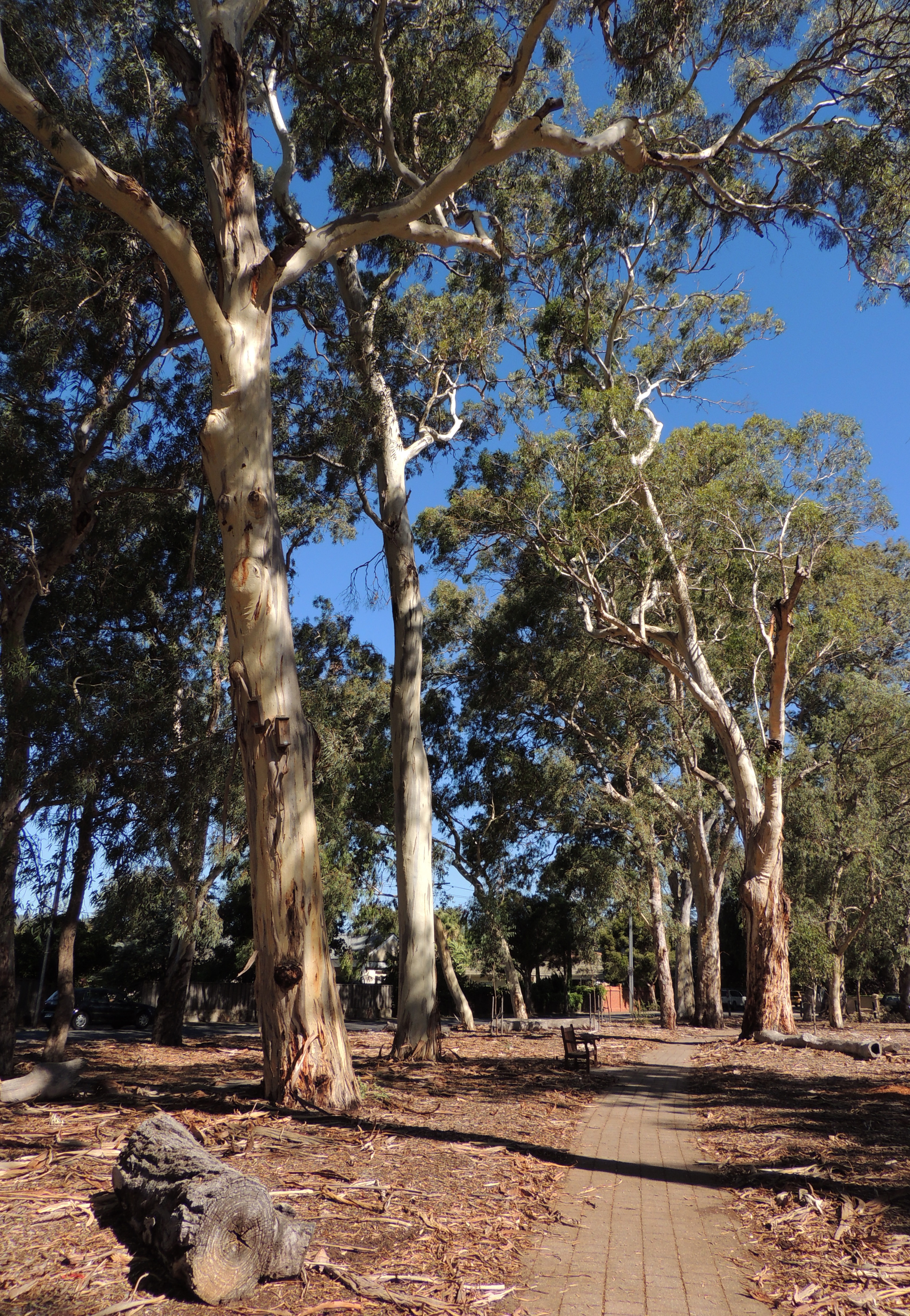
Heywood Park gum trees, January 2015

In 1913, the estate known simply as Heywood was owned and managed by Annie Haslam, widow to William Haslam, who died in 1898. It was regarded as "practically the only park left in the vicinity" and an account of a council inspection of the property's grounds stated:

"There has been some talk of cutting up the property into building lots, and if this is done Unley's last chance of owning a really fine public park will have been lost."

After council acquired the land, 'sanitary conveniences' were constructed and an opening ceremony was planned for 10 December 1921. Community members held fundraisers to support the works and the hosting of a fair to be held in the park on the day of its opening. That year, the Unley Council resolved that Heywood Park should be "...preserved in its natural state as a public park."

== Tree removals ==
In 2003, "staunch public opposition" prevented the introduction of native understorey plants which were proposed to improve the health of long established trees, some of which were showing signs of stress. The outcome was considered a unique rejection of biodiversity enhancement. The Conservation Council of South Australia campaigned for the restoration of original flora in the park, which included golden wattle, native lilac and buttercups, tall bluebells, scented garland and vanilla lilies and native grasses.

In January 2012, a 67-year-old woman received leg lacerations after she was struck by falling branches from a gum tree in Heywood Park. Around 200 people were present at the time, picnicking on Australia Day. The weather was hot and windy.

In 2014 it was announced that up to 40 of the park's 200 trees would be removed during a Tree Risk Remediation Implementation Program. Of the forty marked trees, nine are either Regulated or Significant (in accordance with the Development Act 1993). A regulated tree is any tree greater than or equal to 2 metres in circumference, measured at a point 1 metre above the ground. Significant trees are defined as having a circumference greater than or equal to 3 metres at the same point.

The significant trees marked for removal include two SA blue gums (Eucalyptus leucoxylon) which are in Fair and Good-Fair health according to the council-engaged arborist's assessment. The other two are a river red gum (Eucalyptus camaldulensis) and a willow myrtle (Agonis flexuosa). Their health is considered Good-Fair and Fair-Poor respectively.

The council has advised that noticeboards in the park will update park visitors on the proposed works. The removals are expected to take place in 2015.

== Current use ==
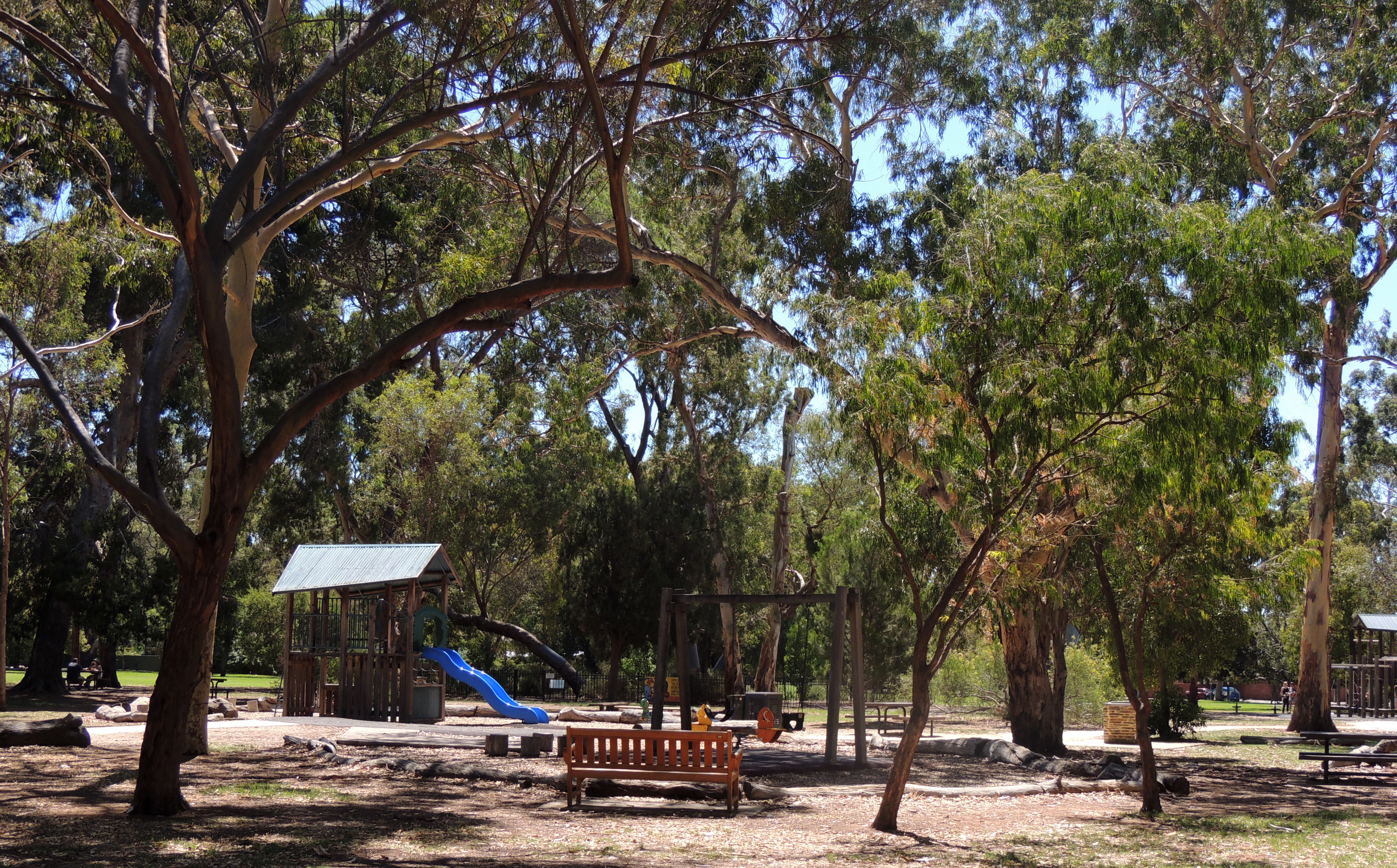
Heywood Park playground, January 2015

As of 2015, the park contains picnic facilities, amenities, lawns, playgrounds and a wide variety of trees, many of which are well established.

== See also ==
- List of Adelaide parks and gardens
