= Sceale Bay, South Australia =

Sceale Bay
- Town
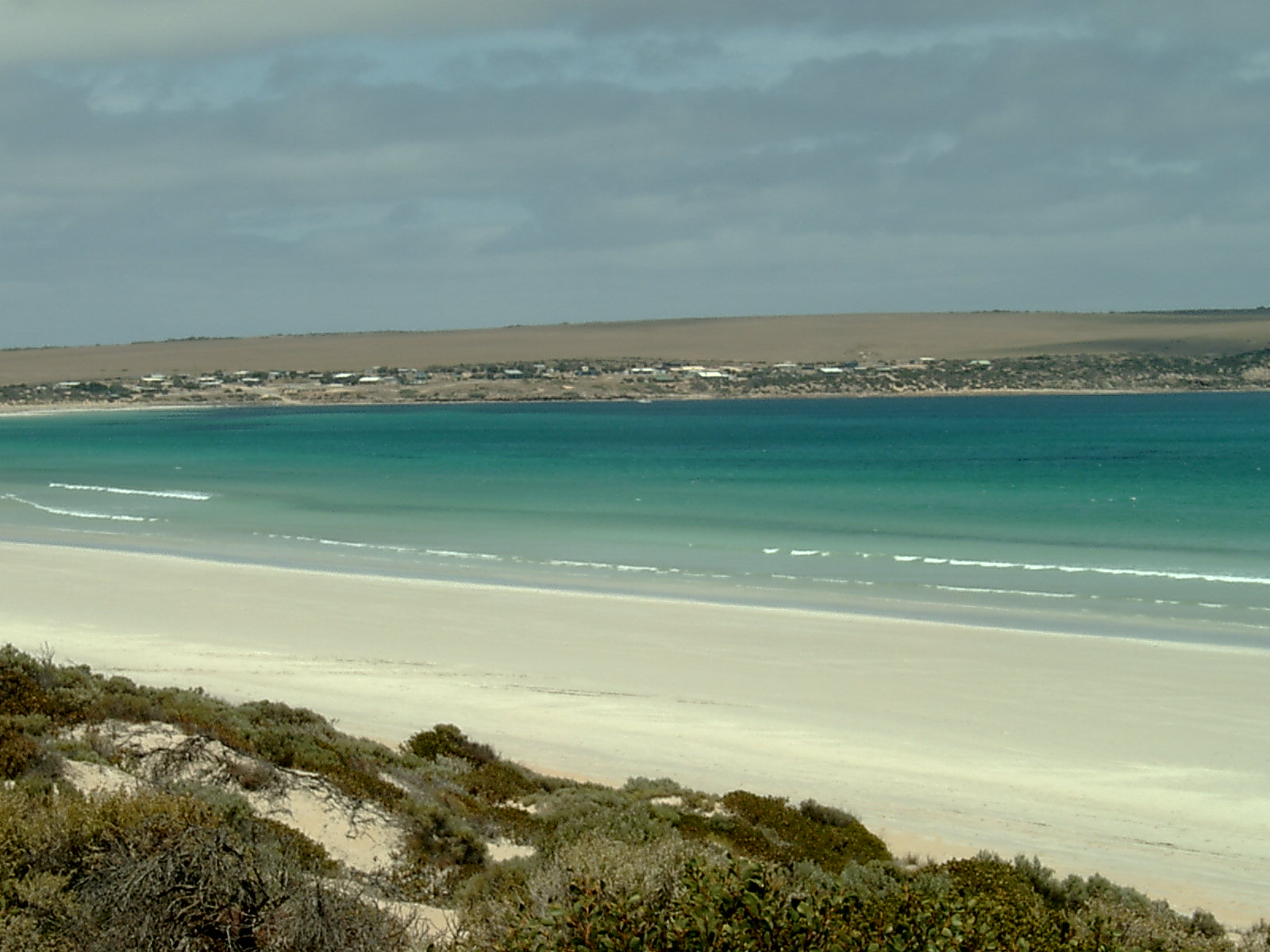
- Sceale Bay viewed from Sceale Bay Conservation Park

- Coordinates: 33°01′06″S 134°11′17″E
- Country: Australia
- State: South Australia
- Region: Eyre Western
- LGA: District Council of Streaky Bay
- Location: 32 km (20 mi) South of Streaky Bay
- Established: 25 October 1888 (town); 12 April 2001 (locality)

Government
  - State electorate: Flinders
  - Federal division: Grey
- Elevation: 1 m (3.3 ft)

Population
  - Total: 42 (2016 census)
- Time zone: UTC+9:30 (ACST)
  - Summer (DST): UTC+10:30 (ACST)
- Postcode: 5680
- County: Robinson
- Mean max temp: 23.1 °C (73.6 °F)
- Mean min temp: 12.2 °C (54.0 °F)
- Annual rainfall: 378.0 mm (14.88 in)
Localities around Sceale Bay
Great Australian Bight	Sceale Bay (body of water); Yanerbie	Yanerbie
Great Australian Bight; Searcy Bay	Sceale Bay	Yanerbie; Calca; Baird Bay (body of water)
Great Australian Bight	Great Australian Bight; Anxious Bay	Anxious Bay

Sceale Bay (formerly Yanera) (pronounced "Scale Bay") is a small town 32 km south of Streaky Bay on the Eyre Peninsula of South Australia. With a permanent population of only 28, the town's numbers increase by threefold over the summer holiday period. The town is primarily an isolated holiday destination, with nothing in the way of commerce or industry occurring in its bounds.

The 2016 Australian census which was conducted in August 2016 reports that Sceale Bay had a population of 42 people.

== Geography ==
The township of Sceale Bay lies on the bay of the same name. The protected waters of the bay have long sandy beaches with minimal swell. However the exposed coast surrounding the bay feels the full force of the Southern Ocean swells. Cliffs and diverse rock formations can be found on the coast bordering the bay. Inland is highly unremarkable for the most part, with agricultural land dominating the scenery. .

== History ==
The bay was named Sceale Bay by Captain Bloomfield Douglas of the South Australian Marine Board in 1858.

The town was proclaimed with the name of Yanera on 25 October 1888. It was officially renamed Sceale Bay in 1940. A jetty was built to service the coastal traders in 1910, but despite a fierce fight to save it, was demolished in 1972.

The locality was created on 12 April 2001 and was given the "long established name". Its boundaries include the Government Town of Sceale Bay. The locality's boundaries were revised on 21 July 2017 to include a parcel of land from the adjoining locality of Yanerbie to satisfy an "administrative direction from the Surveyor General to place all of Allotment 1051, DP.111974 within Sceale Bay."

== Tourism ==
The town is a minor tourist destination, but the small size of the town and restricted accommodation keeps numbers low. A caravan park once existed in the town, as well as a new general store that provided petrol, take away food, fishing and camping needs but has also since closed down

Fishing is the areas major attraction, with boat, rock and beach fishing all possible in the vicinity of the town. All year round the deep reefs hold Snapper, Trevally, Nannygai, Whiting, Kingfish and in the summer, Bluefin Tuna congregate on the offshore lumps. Whiting, Tommy Ruff and Salmon can be caught in the calmer protected waters. A boat ramp is located in Sceale Bay. Murphy's Haystacks are roughly 15 minutes drive from the township.

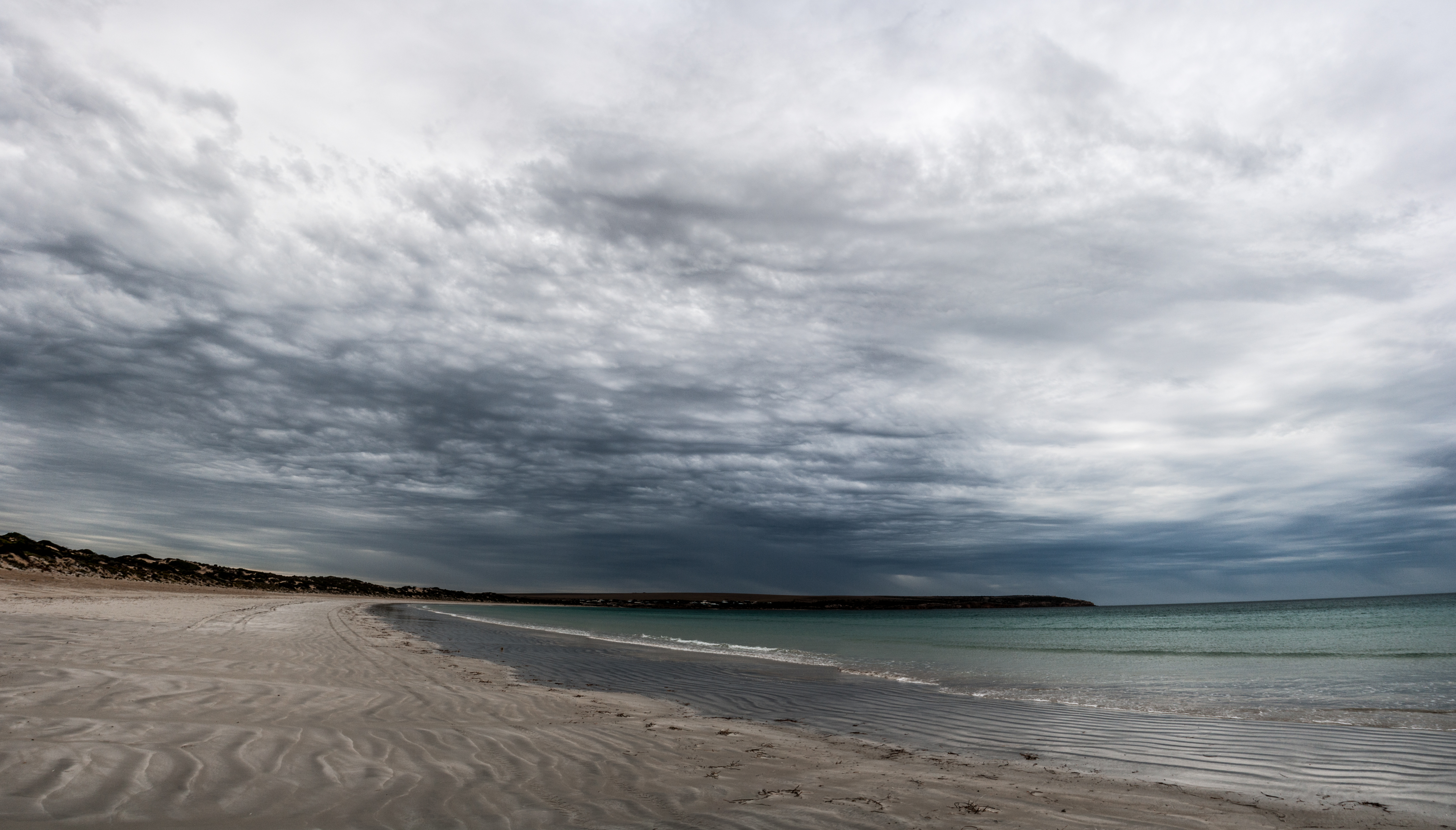
A storm approaching Sceale Bay.

Protected areas in close proximity of Sceale Bay include the Cape Blanche Conservation Park and the Nicolas Baudin Island Conservation Park about 1.5 kilometres (0.93 miles) and 5 kilometres (3.1 miles) respectively to the west, the Searcy Bay Conservation Park about 3.5 kilometres (2.2 miles) to the east and the Sceale Bay Conservation Park about 6 kilometres (3.7 miles) to the north. Sceale Bay Conservation Park was proclaimed in June 2006 to aid in the protection of native flora and fauna, particularly the seal colony located in the bay.
