= District Council of Streaky Bay =

Coordinates: 32.7969°S 134.211°E

- Local government area
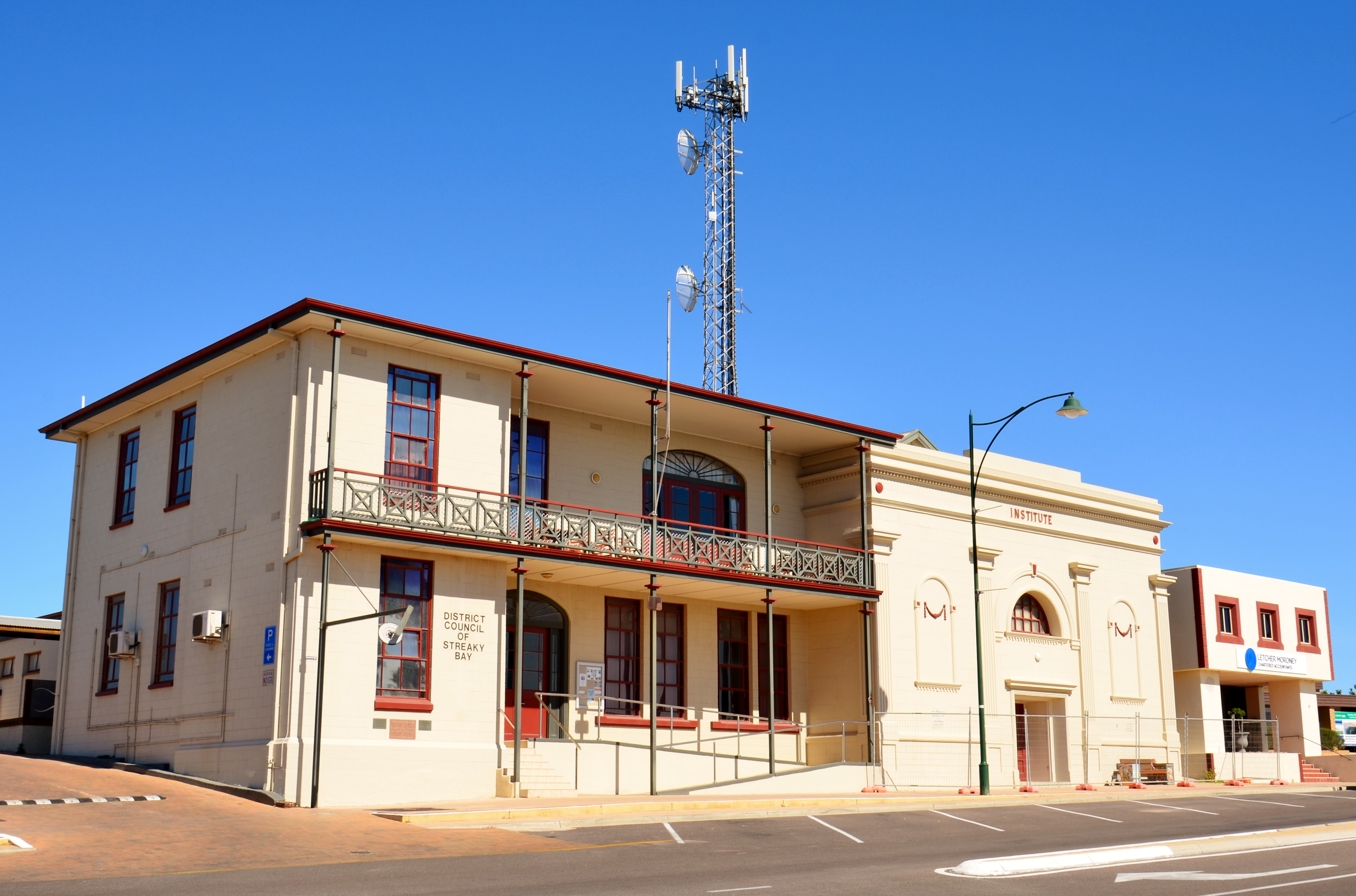
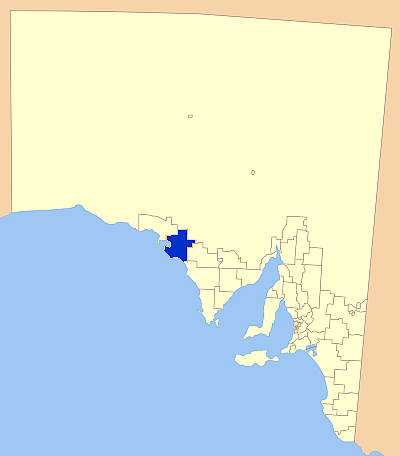
- The District Council office Location of the District Council in blue

- Interactive map of District Council of Streaky Bay
- Country: Australia
- State: South Australia
- Region: Eyre Western
- Established: 1887
- Council seat: Streaky Bay

Government
  - Mayor: Travis Barber
  - State electorate: Flinders
  - Federal division: Grey

Area
  - Total: 6,232 km^{2} (2,406 sq mi)

Population
  - Total: 2,165 (LGA 2021)
- Website: District Council of Streaky Bay
LGAs around District Council of Streaky Bay
District Council of Ceduna	Outback Communities Authority	Outback Communities Authority
Southern Ocean	District Council of Streaky Bay	Wudinna District Council
Southern Ocean	Southern Ocean	District Council of Elliston

The District Council of Streaky Bay is a local government area in South Australia located on the Eyre Peninsula. Streaky Bay is the main population centre of about 1,200 people serving an agricultural district based on farming wheat and other cereal crops, sheep, supplemented by fishing and tourism industries. The district covers an area of 6,251.1 square kilometres with a population of 2,074 people in 2016, according to the Australian Bureau of Statistics. Mayor of Streaky Bay is Travis Barber.

== History ==
The council was established by the District Councils Act 1887 on 5 January 1888. The bounds were defined in the act as "All that portion of the County of Robinson not included in the district of Elliston." This meant that the Hundred of Downer, Hundred of Wallis, a large part of Hundred of Wright south of Venus Bay, and an unincorporated area approximately 100 square miles between the three (proposed to be Hundred of McBeath but never gazetted) within Robinson county were excluded from Streaky Bay council and proclaimed as part of Elliston council instead.

It was, until the creation of the neighbouring District Council of Murat Bay (now Ceduna) in 1925, the farthest outpost of local government in South Australia. In the same year, the District Council of Wudinna was established to the east, annexing the hundreds of Condada, Moorkitabie, Carina, Addison and Travers (about 549 sq mi (1,420 km^{2})) from Streaky Bay council to form the north western flank of the new council.

While the town of Streaky Bay was named Flinders until 1940, the municipality has been titled Streaky Bay since its inception. In 1936, it was the largest local government area in South Australia, covering 6,532.6 square kilometres (1,614,240 acres).

== Localities ==
The district's focal point is the town of Streaky Bay; it also includes the localities of Baird Bay, Bockelberg, Calca, Chandada, Chilpenunda, Colley, Cungena, Eba Anchorage, Haslam, Inkster, Kaldoonera, Maryvale, Mortana, Mount Cooper, Petina, Perlubie, Piednippie, Poochera, Sceale Bay, Tyringa, Wallalla, Wirrulla, Westall, Witera, Yanerbie and Yantanabie, and parts of Carawa, Karcultaby, Koolgera, Pimbaacla and Pureba.

== Elected members ==
Ward	Councillor	Notes
Eyre	Graham Gunn	
Eyre	Trudy McGowan	
Eyre	Philip Wheaton	Deputy Mayor
Flinders	Travis Barber	Mayor
Flinders	Peter Hackett	
Flinders	Lauren Karp	
Flinders	Clifford J Pudney	
Flinders	Neville Trezona	

== Chairmen and mayors of Streaky Bay ==
- Peter Calder Anderson (1927–1938)
- William John Williams (1938–1949)
- Gregory John Cash (1949–1954)
- Arthur Donald Andrew Dodgson (1954–1964)
- Frederick Allen Bellinger (1964–1971)
- Alec Malcolm Baldock (1971–1977)
- Peter John Dodgson (1977–1984)
- Thomas Aiden McCormack (1985–1987)
- John Wharff (1987-1993 and 1997–2003)
- Keith Johnson (1993–1997)
- Ian Gunn (2003–2010)
- Robert Stephens (2010–2014)
- Sherron McKenzie (2014–2016)
- Travis Barber (2016-?)

== See also ==
- Murphys Haystacks
- List of parks and gardens in rural South Australia
