= Seabird breeding behavior =

The term seabird is used for many families of birds in several orders that spend the majority of their lives at sea. Seabirds make up some, if not all, of the families in the following orders: Procellariiformes, Sphenisciformes, Pelecaniformes, and Charadriiformes. Many seabirds remain at sea for several consecutive years at a time, without ever seeing land. Breeding is the central purpose for seabirds to visit land. The breeding period (courtship, copulation, and chick-rearing) is usually extremely protracted in many seabirds and may last over a year in some of the larger albatrosses; this is in stark contrast with passerine birds. Seabirds nest in single or mixed-species colonies of varying densities, mainly on offshore islands devoid of terrestrial predators. However, seabirds exhibit many unusual breeding behaviors during all stages of the reproductive cycle that are not extensively reported outside of the primary scientific literature.

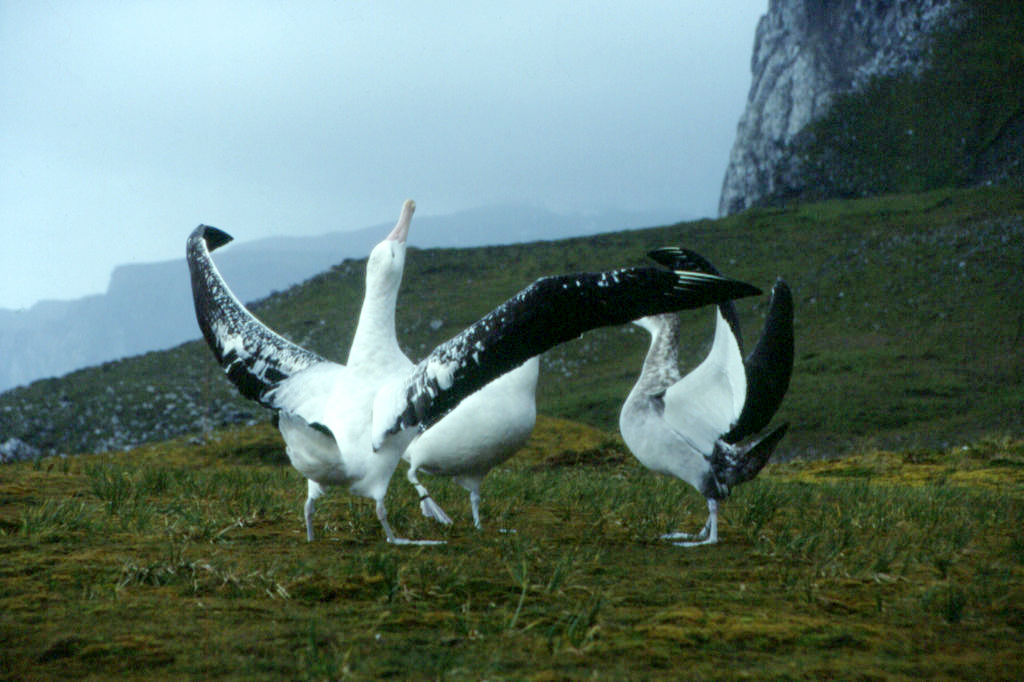
Wandering albatross performing the "sky calling" part of its mating dance at its colony on the Kerguelen Islands, 2004.

== Courtship stage ==
The courtship stage of breeding is when pair bonds are formed and occurs before copulation and occasionally continues through the copulatory and chick-rearing stages of the breeding phenology. The sequence and variety of courting behaviors vary widely among species, but they typically begin with territorial defense, followed by mate-attraction displays, and selection of a nest site. Seabirds are long-lived, socially monogamous, birds that usually mate for life. This makes selecting a mate extremely important with lifelong implications for the reproductive success of both individuals in the pair.

=== Mating dances ===
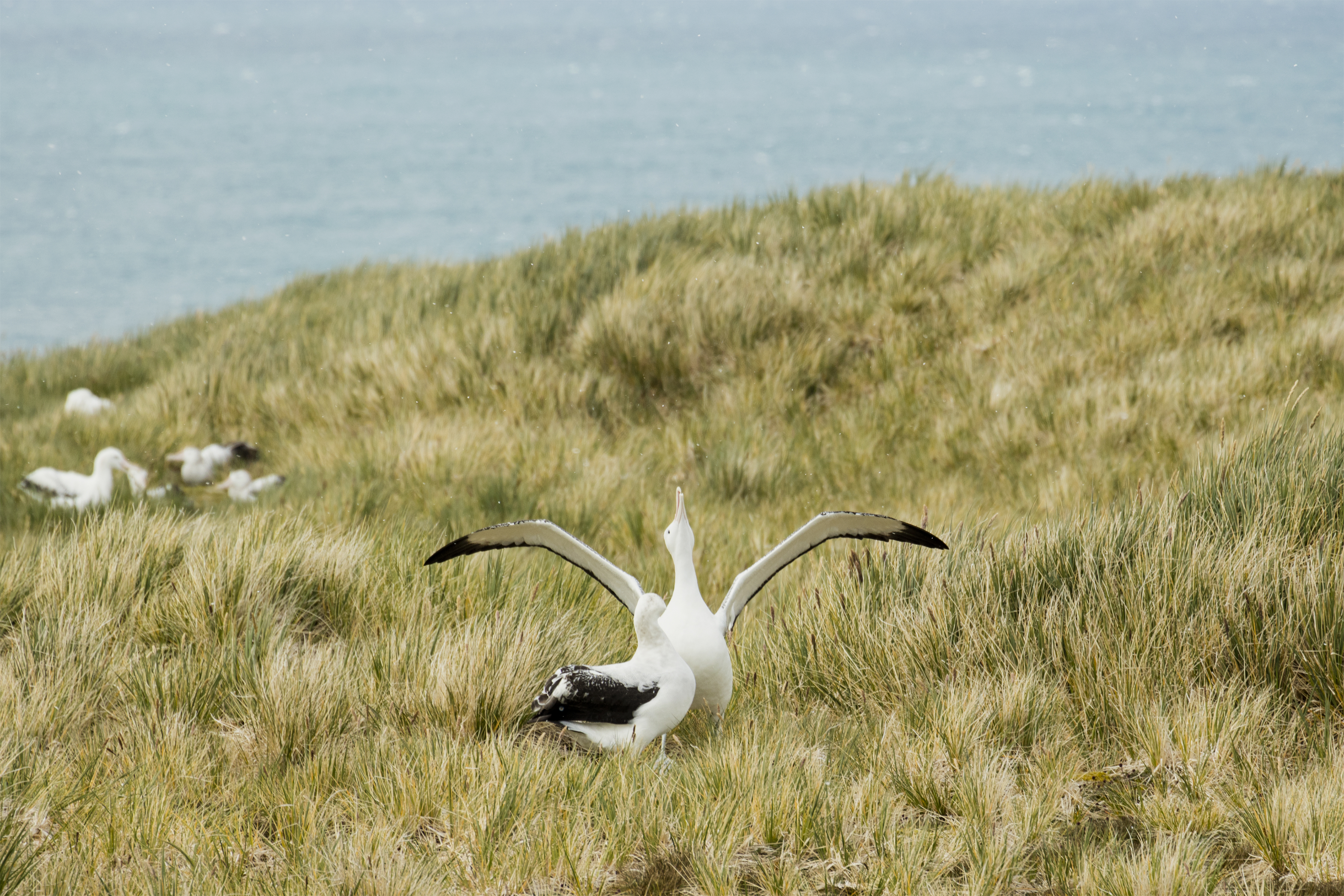
Wandering albatross male courting a female with sky-pointing, clucking, and wing-spreading rituals.

Seabirds are one of the only avian families that include ritualized dances in their courtship. These dances are complex and can include displays and vocalizations that vary greatly between families and orders. Albatrosses are well known for their intricate mating dances. All species of albatross have some form of ritualized dance, with many species displaying very similar forms. Albatrosses' complex visual and vocal dances are considered some of the most developed mating displays in any long-lived animal. Both members of the pair use these dances as a proxy for mate quality and it is believed to be a very important aspect of mate choice in this family. For black-footed (Phoebastria nigripes) and Laysan albatrosses (P. immutabilis) there are ten described parts to their mating dance which can be given in various sequences. Several parts include "billing" where one individual gently touches the others bill and "sky pointing" where the bird rises on the tips of its toes, stretches its neck and points its bill upward. In the wandering albatross (Diomedea exulans), sky pointing is accompanied with "sky calling" where the displaying individual spreads its wings, revealing his massive 12 foot wingspan while pointing and vocalizing skyward. The mating dance may last for several minutes. It has been noted that many albatross species dance upon reuniting with their partner every year; however, for waved albatross (P. irrorata), the dance is longer and more involved in new pairs, or in pairs that failed to breed the previous season.

Boobies are another group of seabirds known for their mating displays. Brown (Sula leucogaster), red-footed (S. sula) and blue-footed boobies (S. nebouxii) have at least nine described parts to their mating display. Sky pointing in boobies is similar to albatrosses; in the brown booby, sky pointing is described as a display where the male throws his head backwards, stretches his neck out, and usually gives a whistling vocalization. Parading is a well-known display in boobies as well; in this display, one individual in the pair – usually the male – walks upright, with his tail erect, swaying in an exaggerated manner from side to side while taking small steps. In blue-footed and red-footed boobies, parading also includes lifting and flaunting their brightly colored feet at their prospective partner.

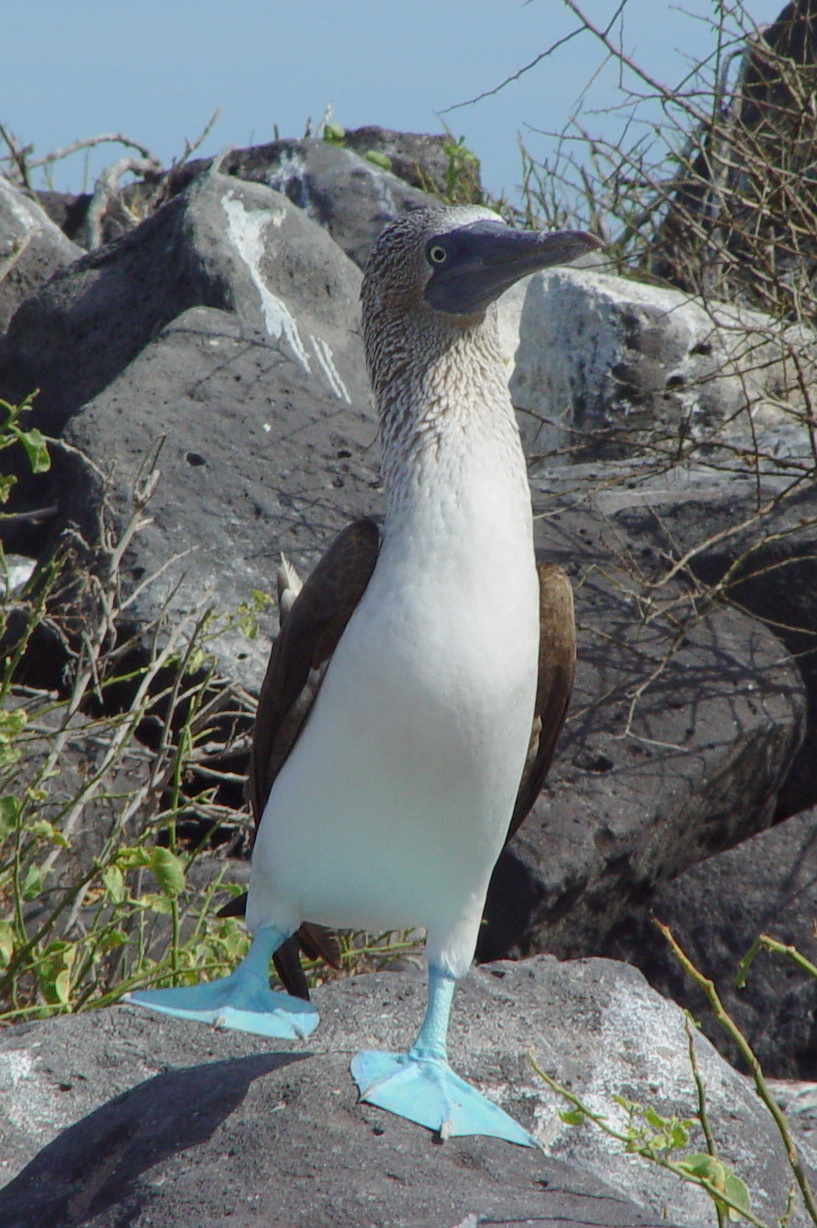
A blue-footed booby performing its "parading" display

Frigatebirds are known for their unusual displays and breeding system. Unlike other seabirds, frigatebirds have a lek-breeding system where displaying males aggregate in groups of up to 30 individuals with prospecting females flying overhead. However, unlike classic leks, the pair then builds a nest on the male's display site. The male then participates fully in nest defense, incubation, and chick-rearing. The main display that male frigatebirds use to attract females is a "gular presentation" where the male inflates his bright red throat pouch, points his head upwards and opens his wings. It has been shown experimentally that there is no correlation between energy expended by males during courtship display and mate selection by females.

=== Courtship feeding ===
Once the pair bond is formed, courtship feeding occurs in some species. Courtship feeding is when one member of the pair presents the other with food in a ritualized way. Often the male feeds the female, but in certain species where the sex roles are reversed, the female may feed the male. Several reasons proposed as to why courtship feeding occurs is: 1) to help strengthen the pair bond 2) to reduce aggression between males and females and 3) to provide additional nutrition to the females during the egg-laying stage.

Courtship feeding is seen in many gull and tern species. In common terns (Sterna hirundo), courtship feeding begins right at the start of pair formation with male terns carrying a fish around the breeding colony, displaying it to prospective mates. The direct benefits hypothesis (where the female obtains some immediate benefit for copulating with the male, food in this case) may explain why courtship feeding has evolved; however, this theory has recently been disputed with the suggestion that the rate of courtship feeding is a way for females to determine the quality of their mate through the handicap principle.

=== Same-sex pairing ===
Homosexual behavior has been well documented in over 500 species of non-human animals ranging from insects to lizards to mammals (reviewed in:). In birds, same-sex pairing has been shown in many families of non-passerines including vultures, ducks, and pigeons. There is also a remarkably high incidence of homosexual behavior in seabirds. Here, homosexual behavior refers to same-sex pair-formation and chick-rearing, not to same-sex copulation, for which there are very few documented examples. Almost all the examples of same-sex pairing in seabirds are of female-female pairs. Furthermore, this phenomenon doesn't seem to be phylogenetically constrained to any specific order or family of seabirds.

There are many examples of homosexual behavior in wild gulls. In American herring gull (Larus smithsonianus, formerly Larus argentatus smithsonianus) populations nesting on the Great Lakes, Fitch (1980) reported a low, yet consistent prevalence of female-female pairs. It appears that female-female American herring gull pairs are more common in colonies with a female-biased operational sex ratio (OSR) and occasionally these homosexual pairs will remain stable for several breeding seasons. In western gulls (Larus occidentalis), female-female pairs are often associated with supernormal clutches (clutches of 4–6 eggs; a normal clutch for Larus gull species is 2–3 eggs) and these clutches are usually infertile. Female-female pairs have also been widely reported in wild populations of ring-billed gulls (Larus delawarensis). Studies of ring-billed gulls has shown that same sex pairs are rare (<1% of pairs in a colony) but consistent interannually and that they also lay supernormal clutches at a significantly higher rate than do heterosexual pairs. It has also been shown that these clutches of female-female pairs have significantly lower hatching and fledging success than heterosexual pairs. There is even one example of an unusual mixed female-female pair of two gull species, the Caspian (Larus cachinnans) and yellow-legged gull (Larus michahellis).

Female-female pairing has also been documented and studied in several tern species including whiskered (Chlidonias hybyida), roseate (Sterna dougalii) and Caspian terns (Hydroprogne caspia) with similar attributes (supernormal clutches and reduced hatching/fledging success as compared to heterosexual pairs) to same-sex gull pairs. Also in the order Charadriiformes (family Chionidae), there has been one reported occurrence of a female-female pair in the black-faced sheathbill (Chionis minor), but eggs in the clutch proved to be inviable.

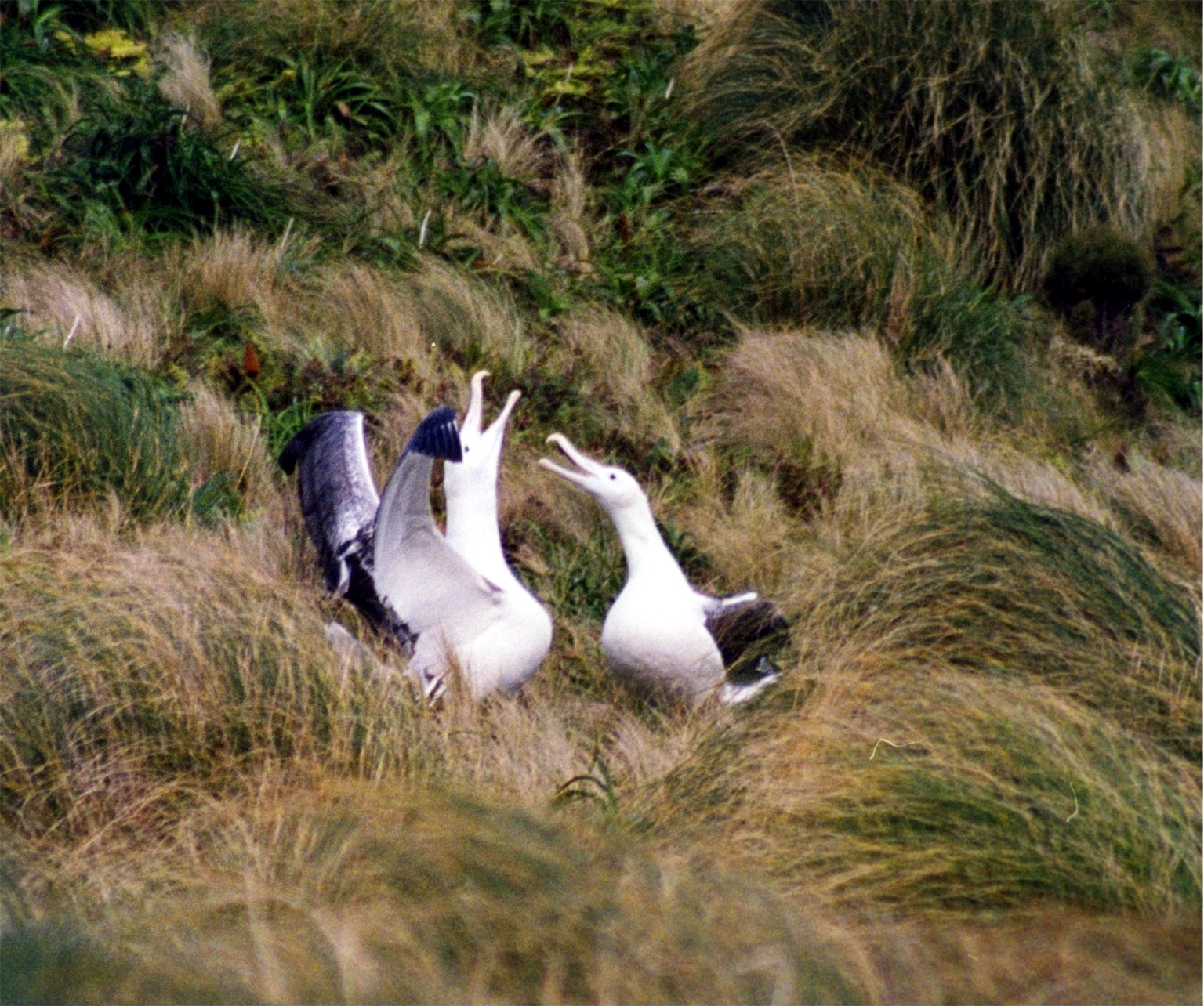
A pair of southern royal albatross at their breeding colony on Campbell Island, New Zealand

Same-sex pairing has also been shown in several families of true seabirds including the petrels and shearwaters. Antarctic petrels (Thalassoica antarctica) have been shown to form female-female pairs in colonies where there is a surplus of females; it is hypothesized that "pairing" with another female may be a favorable strategy for some females because it allows them to become established in the colony. The experience with a site gained through forming a female-female pair may greatly improve the chances of future successful breeding for the non-genetic parent, which explains why it might be worth the short-term cost of raising another bird's offspring. In another member of this family, the Cory's shearwater (Calonectris diomedea borealis), same-sex pairing was recently discovered for the first time in a burrow-nesting seabird. This study proposed that similar factors cause female-female pairs to form in burrow-nesting seabirds as in surface-nesting seabirds (a female-biased OSR), and that female-female pairing in burrow-nesting seabirds might have remained undetected for so long due to the secretive nature of these animals.

In albatrosses, female-female pairing has recently received major press coverage. In 2010, when a southern royal albatross (D. epomophora) couple hatched a chick in New Zealand, it represented the first record of a successful same-sex pair in this species. In a landmark study by Young et al. (2008), she reported over 30% of laysan albatrosses in a colony in Oahu, Hawaii were same sex pairs. Even though these female-female pairs had less reproductive success than heterosexual pairs, it was better than not breeding at all. Young et al. (2008) also cited a female-biased OSR as the primary reason for such a high proportion of same-sex pairs. Additionally, an unsuccessful female-female pair of highly endangered of short-tailed albatrosses (P. albatrus) has been documented on Kure Atoll, Hawaii.

Penguins represent the only known examples of male-male pairings in seabirds. On the Otago Peninsula of New Zealand, two-male yellow-eyed penguins (Megadyptes antipodes) were reported incubating an egg in 2009 In captivity, chinstrap (Pygoscelis antarcticus), Humboldt (Spheniscus humboldti), Magellanic (S. magellanicus), and African black-footed penguins (S. demersus) have all been documented to form male-male pairs.

== Copulatory stage ==
In seabirds, the copulatory stage usually occurs after, and occasionally concurrently, with the formation of the pair bond. Copulation occurs mainly on land at the breeding colony. Usually the pair copulates several times, even in orders that lay only one egg per-clutch. These additional copulations are thought of as a mechanism to strengthen the pair bond. This is important for strongly monogamous, long-lived organisms and is especially important in seabirds that spend most of the non-breeding season apart on the open ocean.

=== Extra-pair copulation/fertilization/paternity ===
Birds are one of the only major taxa where monogamy is the dominant mating system. Prior to the advent of genetic techniques, it was assumed that the majority of monogamous birds remained faithful to their partners. However, it is now known that extra-pair copulations (EPCs), extra-pair fertilizations (EPFs), and extra-pair paternity (the raising of another's offspring, EPP) are actually quite common in a variety of avian orders and families. Roughly 70% of birds that used to be considered genetically monogamous actually engage in EPCs and raise extra-pair young (reviewed by:). Furthermore, it has been proposed that birds that nest in high densities, as seabirds do in breeding colonies, have higher rates of EPCs and EPFs than birds that do not nest colonially. Despite this, Westneat and Sherman (1997) found no significant correlation between nesting density and EPFs in a meta-analysis. Many seabird species raise only one chick per breeding season, which would make the prevalence of EPFs and EPP in seabirds surprising due to the fact that the male's entire breeding success for a year is dependent on the lone egg/chick he is raising to be his genetic offspring. Moreover, all seabirds have obligate biparental care, so it would be evolutionarily costly for the male to spend months of effort raising a chick that is not his genetic offspring.

In line with this prediction, many studies of seabirds have revealed no EPCs or EPFs. Several genetic studies of storm-petrels, show no evidence of EPCs or EPFs, which is not surprising considering these are burrow-nesting seabirds that lay only one egg per year and show high biparental investment. Dovekie (Alle alle), a surface nesting alcid that raises one chick per year, has shown no EPFs or EPP. Nazca boobies (Sula granti) have been well studied at breeding colonies in the Galapagos for decades and also show no evidence of EPCs or EPFs; also not a surprising result since they only have one surviving offspring per year. Chinstrap penguins, which raise two chicks annually, have also shown no EPCs or EPFs.

Contrary to these empirical results, there has been a multitude of studies where EPCs or EPFs have been found in seabirds. Perhaps the most surprising EPFs have been found in the Procellariiformess because all members of this order only lay one egg per year and some do not even breed every year. Waved albatross show high rates (up to 25% of offspring are extra-pair young) of both EPCs and EPFs and behavioral observations have shown that many of the EPCs are forced by the extra-pair male. Studies of wandering albatross have shown over 10% of chicks are extra-pair young; an extremely surprising result since adult wandering albatrosses only breed once every other year when successful. Similar results were seen in black-browed (Thalassarche melanophris) and grey-headed albatrosses (T. chrysostoma) nesting on South Georgia Island. EPFs have also been shown in Antarctic petrels. Perhaps the most unexpected result was when EPCs and EPFs were documented in two burrow-nestings Procellariids, namely the short-tailed shearwater (Puffinus tenuirostris) and Cory's shearwater (Calonectris diomedea borealis). In the short-tailed shearwater, EPFs occur because the female would have to leave her burrow to solicit an EPC. In the Cory's shearwater population from Vila islet, Santa Maria island, Azores, strong competition for nesting cavities/burrows may explain the occurrence of EPCs and EPFs, with small males facing higher risks of cuckoldry than large ones

EPCs and EPFs have also been demonstrated to occur in other families of seabirds. In contrast to the results found in genetic studies of dovekie, EPP has been shown in several species of alcid including common murre (Uria aalge) and razorbill (Alca torda), both of which raise only one chick per year. It has been shown that female razorbills can determine whether or not an EPC leads to an EPF and only accept extra-pair sperm when it gives them a fitness advantage over their current mate. A low-rate of EPP has also been shown in the sexually dimorphic great frigatebird (Fregata minor).

=== Inbreeding ===
Mating with related individuals is rare in naturally occurring populations of birds due to the production of lower quality offspring suffering from the genetic effects of inbreeding depression. Seabirds have an inherently high risk of inbreeding because most are natally philopatric, and many are highly endangered with some species' entire populations breeding on one small island. Despite this, inbreeding was observed no more than expected by random chance in the wandering albatross and the critically endangered Amsterdam albatross (D. amsterdamensis). In contrast, some studies of seabirds have shown evidence of inbreeding. Huyvaert and Parker (2010) detected low frequencies of inbreeding in waved albatrosses and genetic similarity was negatively related to EPFs, which is an unusual result that does not support the inbreeding avoidance hypothesis. Close inbreeding was observed at low frequencies in the Mediterranean Cory's shearwater (Calonectris diomedea diomedea) where two mother-son pairs were reported.

== Chick-rearing stage ==
Chick-rearing is the most crucial stage of the reproductive cycle in determining final reproductive success during a breeding season. Chick-rearing includes brooding, feeding, defending, and in some cases, teaching the chick skills it will need to know to survive independently. Chick-rearing can be totally absent in some birds (the brush-turkeys of southeast Asia), to a couple weeks long in many passerines, to several months long in larger birds. Seabirds, along with some Australian and Southern African landbirds such as the southern ground hornbill or white-winged chough, have the longest chick-rearing stage of any bird on earth. It is not unusual for many seabirds to spend 3–4 months raising their chicks until they are able to fledge and forage independently. In the great albatrosses, chick-rearing can take over 9 months. It is because of this extremely protracted chick-rearing stage that many of the larger procellariiform seabirds can breed only once every other year.

=== Siblicide ===
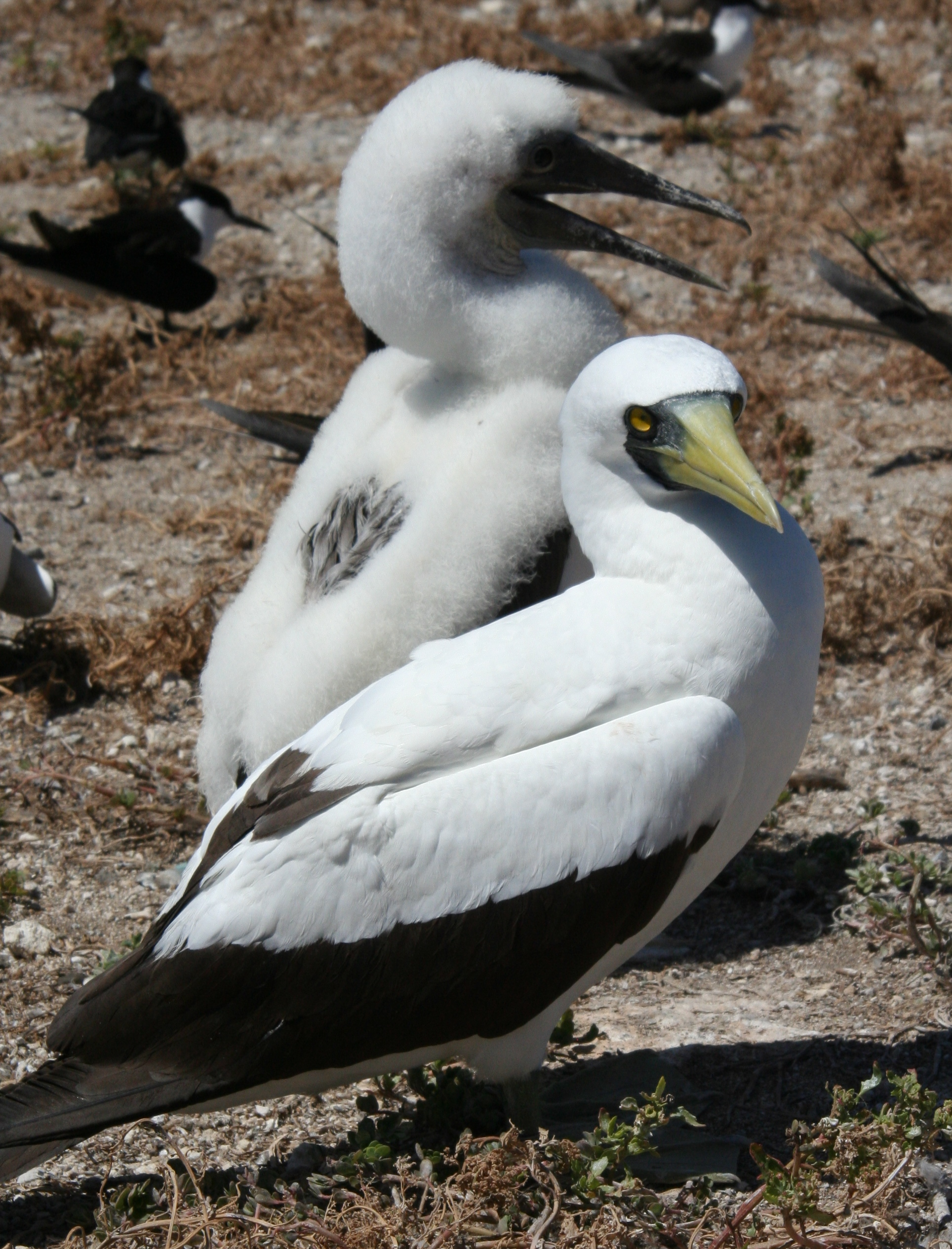
Nazca booby adult with a large chick. This species lays two eggs; after the eggs hatch, the larger, healthier chick almost always kills their smaller sibling. This is one of the few species in the animal kingdom where siblicide is thought to be obligate

Siblicide, the death of an individual due to the actions of members of its own clutch, is seen in several avian orders including egrets and kingfishers, some raptors, and grackles. In most of these examples, siblicide is facultative (i.e. not obligate) and only occurs when there is a shortage of food. However, in some seabirds, siblicide proves to be obligate and occurs no matter how productive the breeding season is. The Nazca booby is one species that practices obligate siblicide. The parents lay two eggs, several days apart. The second egg laid is seen as fertility insurance if the first egg is inviable. If both eggs hatch, the elder chick will push its sibling out of the nest area, leaving it to die of thirst or cold. The parent booby will not intervene and the younger chick will inevitably die. Research has shown that high hormone levels in Nazca booby chicks are responsible for inciting their murderous behavior. Facultative siblicide is seen in the closely related blue-footed booby. Unlike the Nazca booby, blue-footed boobies chicks only perform siblicide when food is scarce. Furthermore, the parents actually try to suppress the siblicidal behavior, rather than ignoring or encouraging it.

== Pair-splitting ==
=== Divorce ===
For most seabirds if breeding is successful they will continue breeding with the same partner year after year until one member of the pair dies or doesn't return to the breeding colony. However, these pair bonds occasionally dissolve or are forced apart while both members of the pair are still alive, a process known as divorce. Reasons for divorce in seabirds are wide-ranging and include asynchronous arrival of mates to the breeding colony, declining reproductive success of the pair, and competition for mates. Coercive divorce is seen in the Nazca booby and common murre where one member of the pair actively deserts the other or where an intruder enters and forcibly splits the breeding pair to form a new pair.

Divorce is relatively common in gulls and their relatives (reviewed by:); in one study, black-legged kittiwakes (Rissa tridactyla) proved to be more faithful to their nesting site than their partner. Divorce rates are surprisingly high (>80% of pairs annually) in king penguin (Aptenodytes patagonicus) and emperor penguins (A. forsteri). Asynchronous arrival of mates at the breeding colony is cited as the main reason for this because these penguins have extreme time constraints on their breeding. In great skuas (Stercorarius skua) divorce occurs annually, but at low frequencies (6–7% of pairs annually) and death is responsible for approximately three times more pair interruptions than divorce. Divorce is uncommon in procellariiforms and usually only occurs after several years of breeding failure. However, one study of short-tailed shearwaters observed the divorce rate in a colony to be as high as 16% annually.

== Breeding behaviour by family ==
=== Pelecanidae ===
Pelicans form pair bonds that last for a single brooding period until their young leave the nest. This duration varies as length of upbringing and duration before divorce varies between individual pairs. Pelicans perform courtship displays in order to attract female counterparts when part of a breeding colony. Large breeding colonies are formed when courtship flights are observed by other pelicans, indicating that the site is a breeding ground. Breeding colonies break down into smaller groups that consist of a female and two or three males that perform several courtship rituals in order to attract the female to copulate.

Male courtship displays are performed until the most dominant male of the group is the last to remain to be able to mate with the female. Strutting walks are performed when all males walk single file with their bodies erect and their bills pointed to the ground to display for the female. Larger, more dominant males frequently take up the back of the line in order to peck and jab at subordinate males during the routine. This display is performed until the female bows their head with bill tucked down to the ground. Mate selection is completed once all subordinate males have left the group to join others. Copulation is initiated with a mutual bow between the male and female where the male bows over the neck or back of the female, often swinging its head from side to side in a figure eight motion. The pair copulates multiple times for 6 to 22 seconds over a duration of several hours until the mating behaviour has ceased.

=== Spheniscidae ===
Penguin courtship consists of both auditory and visual displays; however, their presentation varies by species. Three main forms of courtship behaviour can be observed in most penguin species with the male initiating the displays to attract a female mate and to establish a nesting site.

Ecstatic displays are the first of the tree behaviours observed during courtship in which the male penguin bows low and raises its beak with a trumpeting squawk with its flippers lifted in the air and may sometimes shake or sway their head. This behaviour is performed to attract mates, establish their nesting site, and to signal to neighbouring males to keep their distance.

Mutual Ecstatic displays are the second behaviour performed during courtship in which both the male and the female partner perform ecstatic displays to one another. This behaviour varies among species once again, with the most prominent difference being that of the emperor penguin whose two partners stand with head touching with bills facing down, and softly braying (honking). Both partners perform the mutual behaviour at the same time in order to improve partner recognition, organised nesting sites and roles, and to strengthen the pair bond of the two species.

Bowing is the final observed courtship behaviour observed in most penguin species. This behaviour is characterized when the male and female bow towards the ground with heads tilted down, heads shaking, and often making a soft hissing or growling sound to one another. This behaviour is believed to also strengthen the pair bond between the couple and is usually noted when one partner returns to the nest when foraging for food or other resources.

=== Phalacrocoracidae ===
Cormorants develop breeding pair bonds that last for a duration of a single breeding season but have been shown to sometimes carry over into the following breeding season. Courtship begins in group breeding grounds located on isolated shorelines and in nearby waters with pair chasing and presentation of a nuptial gift of nesting supplies provided by the male indicating the beginning of pair formation. Males begin the courtship process by establishing a nesting site nearby other cormorant nests and performs threat displays to deter other pairs from nesting too close. Upon arrival of the female mate, the cormorant performs a "wing flapping" behaviour in which the male assumes a horizontal stature, erects its tail with spread plumage, head drawn back with its neck touching its dorsal side and raises its beak with inflated gorge to the sky, and will often produce a cackling cry. The cormorant will raise its wings to display plumage and flap wings in rhythmic formation along with bobbing its head side to side and will increase the frequency of this behaviour as the female draws near. The male cormorant has also been shown to perform "gaping behaviour" by thrusting their open bill with inflated pouch forward accompanied by a call, or to display nesting materials that lie underneath the male in order to attract interest of the desired female mate.

After copulation the pair performs several pair strengthening and recognition behaviours with intermittent departures by the male to retrieve food and nesting resources. Examples of observed pair-strengthening behaviours are: gaping display (see above), pointing display (neck end bill extended far forward pointed up with tail plumage spread), pawing (male returning to nest gently places foot on back of female), nesting material display (returning male presents newly found nesting material to the female), and hopping display (with bill initially pointing towards ground, cormorant jumps slightly off of ground and will raise its neck and beak to a vertical position with its gular pouch inflated and feathers ruffled followed by slowly tilting the head to one side or the other).

=== Phaethontidae ===
Tropicbirds breed in pair bonds that often carry over during the course of several breeding seasons as they possess a strong attachment to successful nesting sites, although this does not always occur and is subject different pairing patterns. Courtship behaviour takes place in groups at breeding ground sites and is initiated by the male who performs aerial displays near group nesting sites by flying in wide circles up to approximately 100 meters in the air, performing calls in sync with beats of their wings, and drooping their long tails and streamers down. This behaviour attracts many other nearby tropicbirds to perform aerial displays to form group sizes ranging from 6–12 individuals. The female will select one of the displaying males and the pair will break off from the group and will begin synchronized flight displays. These displays can be categorized as zigzagging patterns or in a descending glide with one partner flying closely above the other where the mate on top points their wings in a downward angle while the bottom mate points their wings in an upward angle. During this behaviour, the upper bird may direct their tail streamers down to touch their partner mid-flight and may last for hundreds of meters. Once the pair bond is formed, the pair will establish their nesting site and copulate in the nest.

Aerial courtship behaviour has been shown to attract more available breeding birds from nearby grounds and also believed to synchronize breeding timing with other individuals or neighboring groups. Aerial displays when in a group are shown to most commonly occur during the morning, with numbers decreasing toward the afternoon as mates are selected or individuals give up

== See also ==
- Mating
- Animal sexual behavior
- Homosexual behavior in animals
- Bird colony
