= Cape Blanche Conservation Park =

Protected area in South Australia

- IUCN category III (natural monument or feature)
- Location within South Australia
- Location: South Australia
- Nearest city: Streaky Bay
- Coordinates: 33°1′39.94″S 134°10′3.58″E
- Area: 810 km^{2} (310 sq mi)
- Established: 9 February 2012
- Governing body: Department for Environment and Water

Cape Blanche Conservation Park is a protected area located on the west coast of Eyre Peninsula in South Australia about 25 kilometres (16 miles) south of Streaky Bay. It was proclaimed under the National Parks and Wildlife Act 1972 in 2012 for the purpose of protecting "important breeding habitat for the eastern osprey (Pandion cristatus) and white-bellied sea-eagle (Haliaeetus leucogaster)" and "diverse range of flora" including "the west coast mintbush (Prostanthera calycina)", and to "provide important habitat for threatened shorebirds and migratory birds, including the hooded plover (Thinornis rubricollis), sooty oystercatcher (Haematopus fuliginosus) and sanderling (Calidris alba)". The conservation park is classified as an IUCN Category III protected area.
