= Murphy's Haystacks =

Coordinates: 33°00′54.7″S 134°29′19.67″E

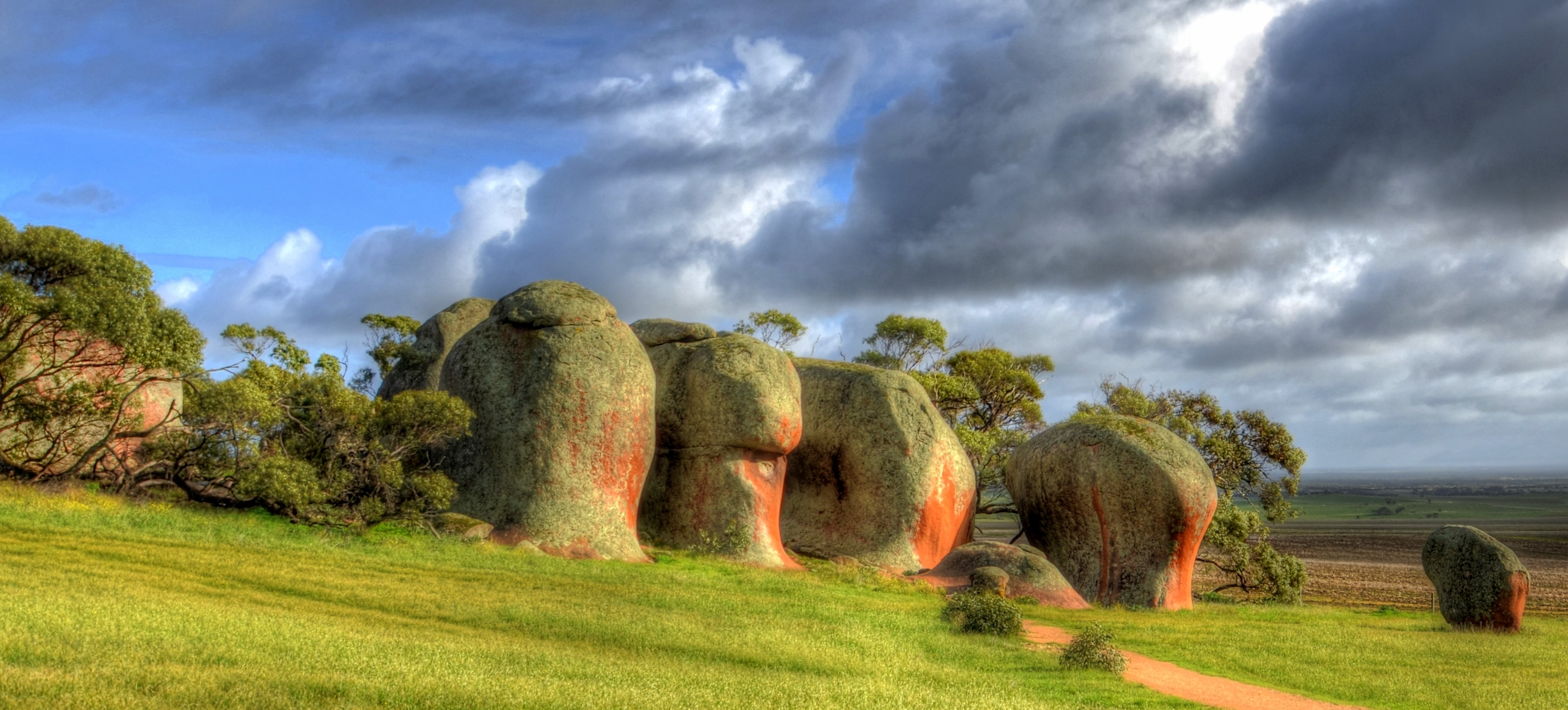
Murphy's Haystacks

Murphy's Haystacks are inselberg rock formations located at Mortana, between Streaky Bay and Port Kenny on the Eyre Peninsula in South Australia.

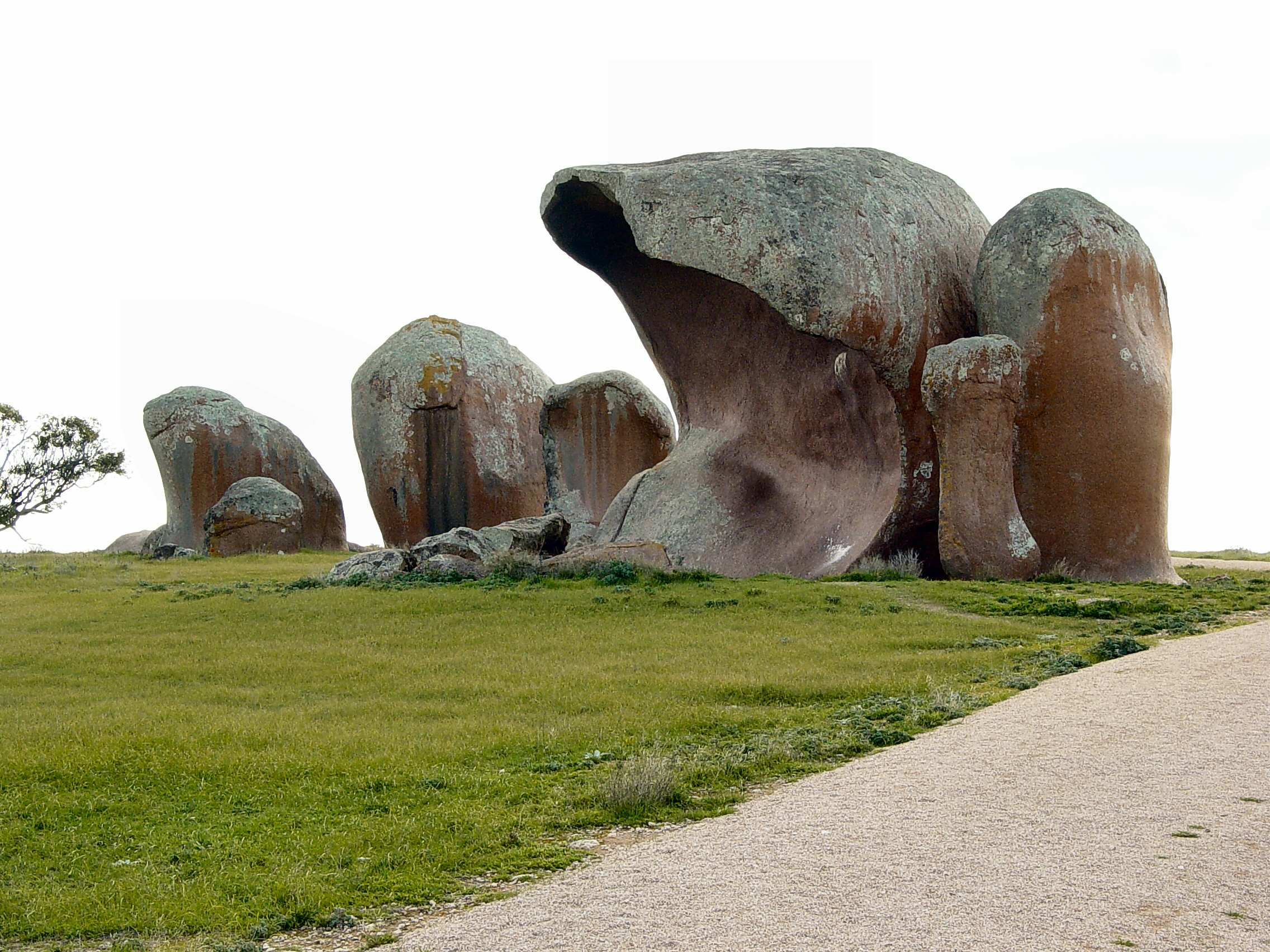
The overhanging dome formation is approximately 8 metres (26 ft) high.

They are of a tumulus form of weathered granite outcrop. They are made of a pink, massive, coarsely equigranular rock consisting mostly of quartz and orthoclase. Their appearance may be due to a combination of erosion by underground rainwater and then by subsequent weathering after they were exposed. Most of the pillars emerge without a break from the underlying granite. Their structural base may be of orthogonal or vertically-aligned sheet jointing.

They obtained their name because a traveller in a coach saw the formation in the distance. He asked how a farmer could produce so much hay. As the farm was on a property owned by a man called Murphy, the rocks became known as Murphy's Haystacks.

The site is listed on the South Australian Heritage Register.

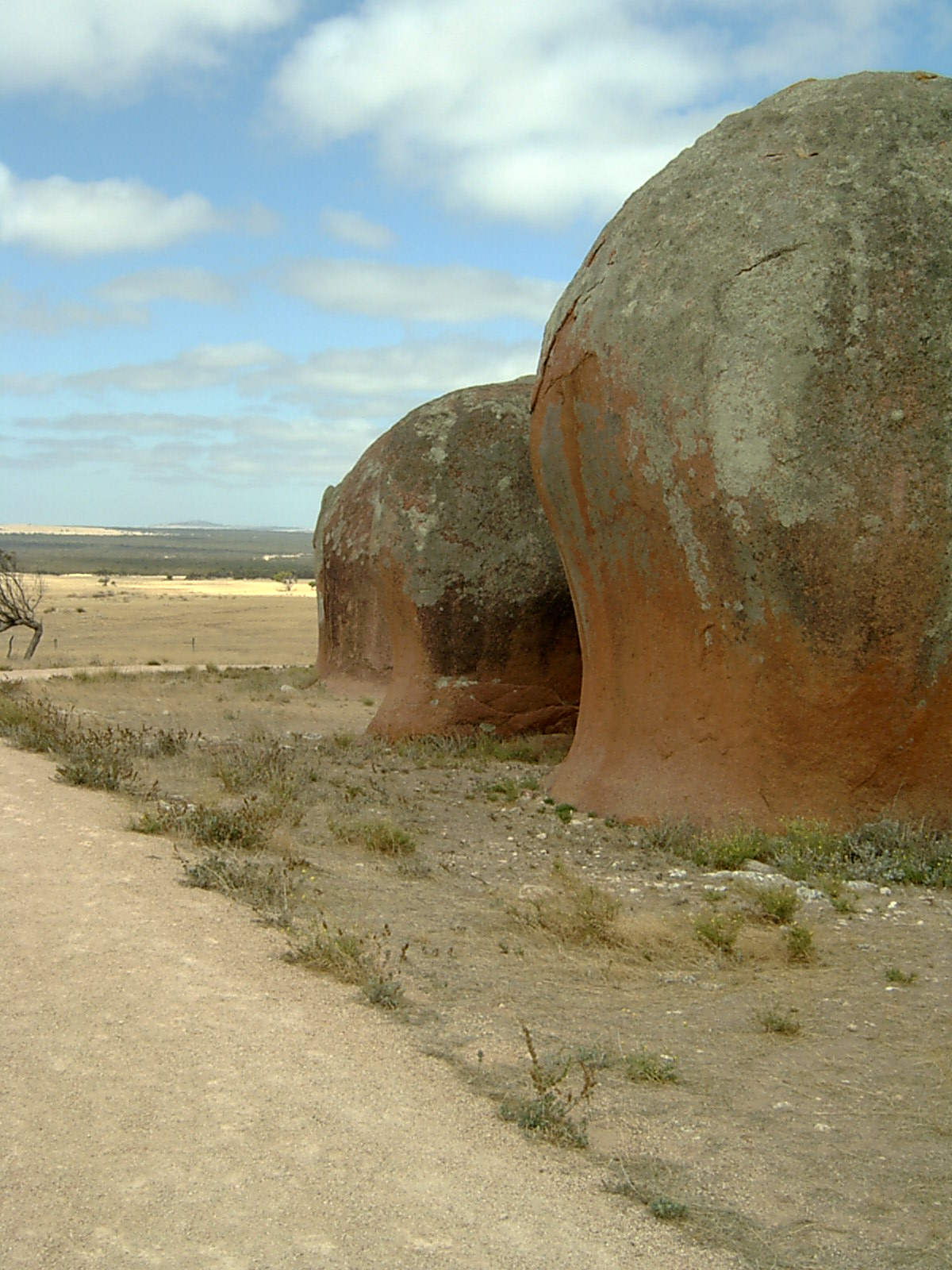
Reverse side of the formation
