= Streaky Bay, South Australia =

Streaky Bay
- Town
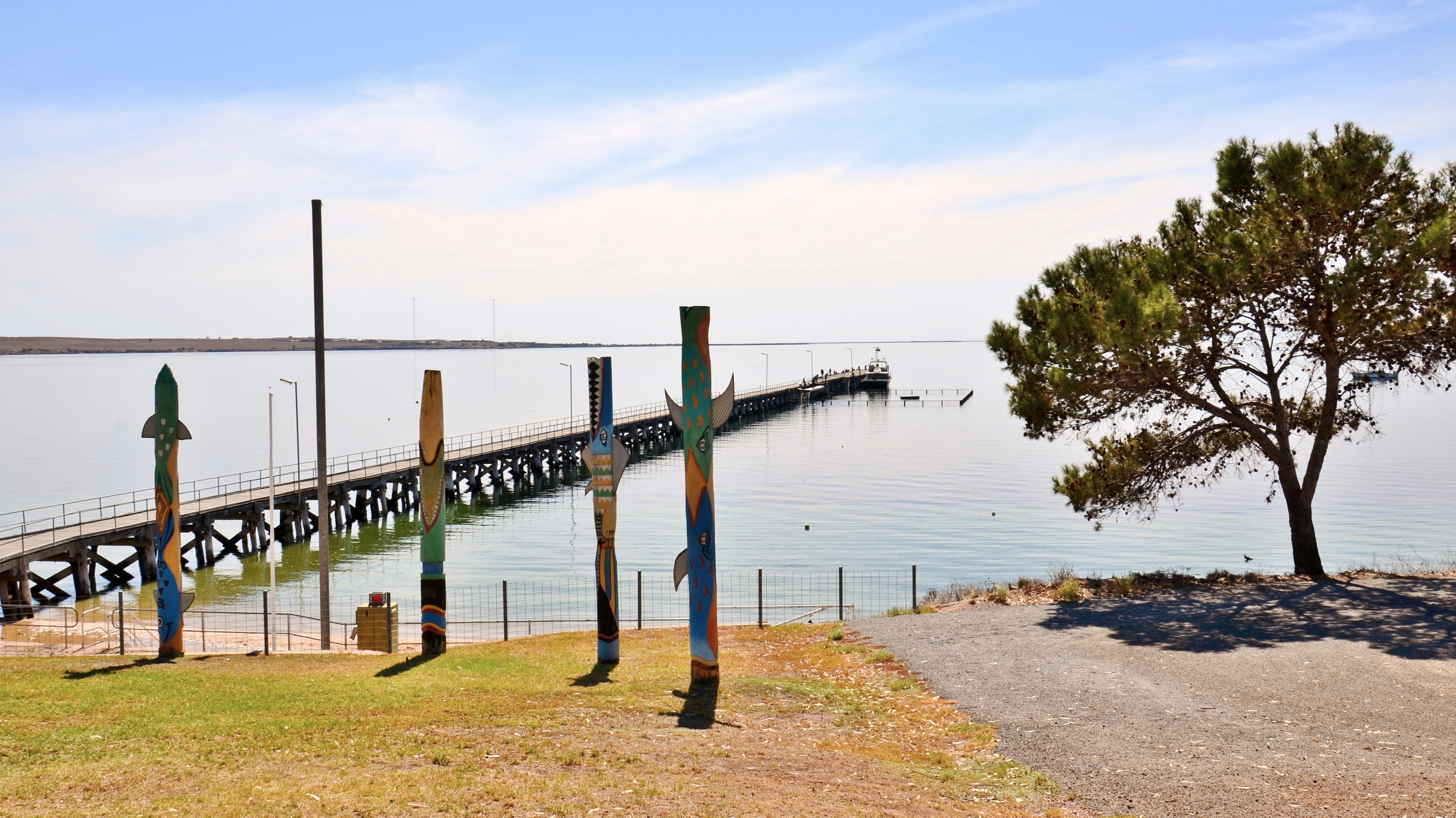
- Streaky Bay Jetty

- Coordinates: 32°47′57″S 134°12′17″E
- Country: Australia
- State: South Australia
- LGA: District Council of Streaky Bay
- Location: 727 km (452 mi) North West of Adelaide
- Established: 1872

Government
  - State electorate: Flinders
  - Federal division: Grey
- Elevation: 12.2 m (40 ft)

Population
  - Totals: 1,436 (2021); 1,378 (2016 census)
- Postcode: 5680
- Mean max temp: 23.3 °C (73.9 °F)
- Mean min temp: 12.6 °C (54.7 °F)
- Annual rainfall: 373.6 mm (14.71 in)

Streaky Bay (formerly Flinders) is a coastal town on the western side of the Eyre Peninsula, in South Australia just off the Flinders Highway, 303 km (188 mi) north-west of Port Lincoln and 727 km (452 mi) by road from Adelaide. At the 2021 census, Streaky Bay recorded a population of 1,436.

The town of Streaky Bay is the major population centre of the District Council of Streaky Bay, and the centre of an agricultural district farming cereal crops and sheep, as well as having established fishing and tourism industries.

== History ==
For many thousands of years, the area around Streaky Bay has been inhabited by the Wirangu people.

In 1627, Dutch explorer Pieter Nuyts, in the Gulden Zeepaard (Golden Seahorse), became the first European to sight the area. In 1937 an obelisk was erected on the median strip in Bay Road, near the Alfred Terrace intersection. It was described by W. H. Howard as "The only monument in Australia commemorating the ter-centenary of an historic event".

In 1802, Matthew Flinders named Streaky Bay whilst on his voyage in the Investigator. In his log of 5 February 1802, he notes: "And the water was much discoloured in Streaks... and I called it Streaky Bay"

It is now thought these streaks are caused by the release of oils by certain species of seaweed in the bay.

The first European land exploration was conducted on behalf of the Secondary Towns Association by John Hill and Samuel Stephens, whose expedition arrived at Streaky Bay on 15 August 1839 using the chartered brig Rapid as a base.

A fortnight later, on 25 August 1839, Edward John Eyre, who had explored overland from Port Lincoln, arrived at the locality and established a small base about 3 kilometres from what is now the Streaky Bay Township, which he used as a store for his overland expeditions to Point Bell. That site, known as Eyre's Waterhole, is listed on the South Australian Heritage Register, and can still be seen just off the Flinders Highway.

The Streaky Bay and nearby Elliston areas became taboo for the Aboriginal people of the region following conflict with European settlers in the mid-19th century. There were killings on both sides, the most significant event being the Waterloo Bay massacre of a large number of Aboriginal people in May 1849.

Pastoralists moved into the area from 1854. The town was officially proclaimed in 1872 as Flinders, but was changed to Streaky Bay in 1940, to reflect local usage.

Wheat growing began in the 1880s and, by 1906, 31,000 bags of wheat and 470 bales of wool had been exported from Streaky Bay by ship. By that time a telegraph office had been established and regular mail deliveries were made from Port Lincoln.

In September 1918, a massive blue whale, over 26 metres long, was cast onto rocks on Gibson's Peninsula. Its skeleton is still on display in the South Australian Museum.

== Geography ==
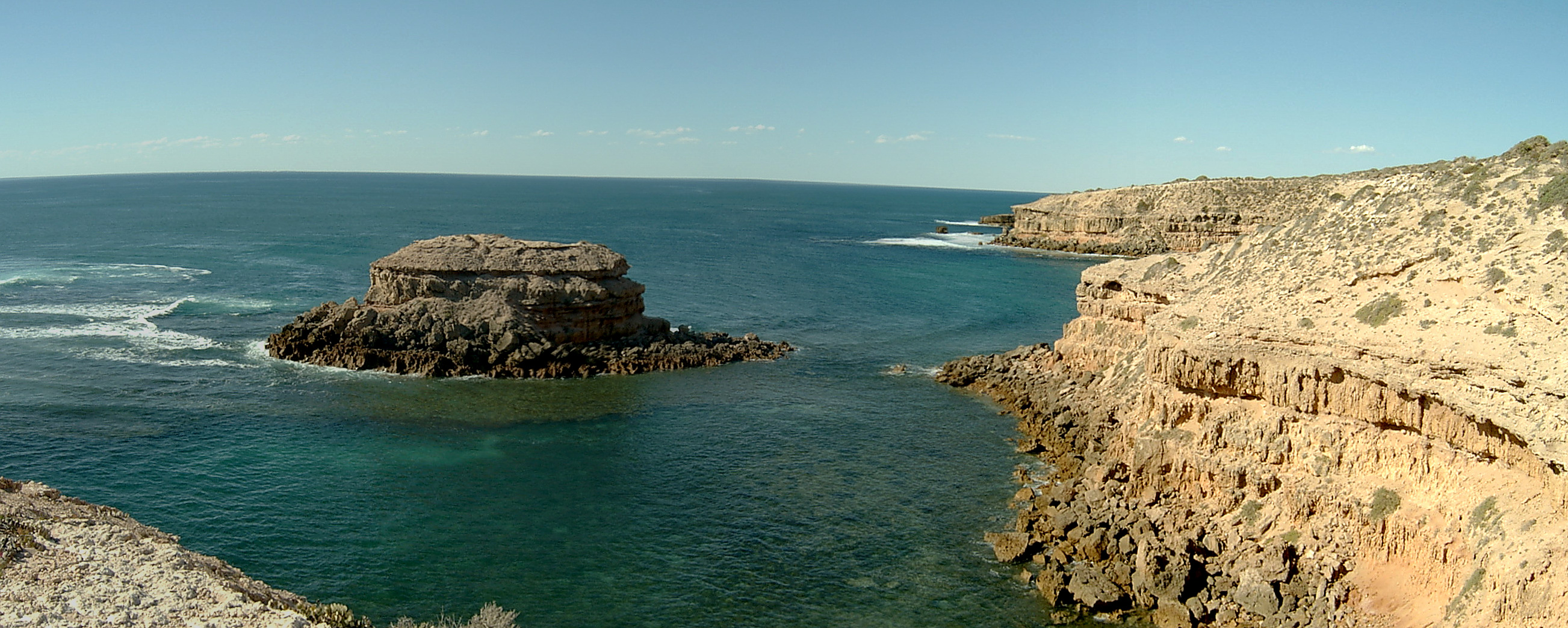
Cape Bauer, north-west of Streaky Bay

Streaky Bay and the surrounding district show a great variety of landscapes, from largely untouched native scrubland and farming country to cliffs and extensive surf beaches. The inland areas of the district are largely dominated by pastoral country; however areas such as the Calpatanna Waterhole Conservation Park located 30 km SE of Streaky Bay represents an example of the original coastal and salt lake environments, where wildlife still abounds. Possibly the areas most interesting geological features are Murphy's Haystacks. These pink granite formations have been dated at 1590 million years old.

The features that most commonly draw tourists are along the immense stretch of coastline surrounding the bay. The Bay itself is relatively protected and quiet stretches of beach can be found along most of its length. However, where the coastline is exposed to the swells of the Southern Ocean, cliffs are exposed, along with sheltered areas that harbour large rockpools, such as Smooth Pool and The Granites. The islands of the Nuyts Archipelago lie to the north-west.

Streaky Bay has a mild climate with the average a few degrees above Adelaide in summer and winter with an average rainfall of 378 mm per year.

The township of Streaky Bay is situated on the southern end of the bay, on an enclosed inlet named Blanche Port (after Lady Blanche MacDonnell, the wife of Governor Richard MacDonnell) or Augusta Harbor.

== Climate ==
Streaky Bay has a hot-summer mediterranean climate (Köppen: Csa), with very warm, dry summers and mild, wetter winters. Temperatures in summer are highly unpredictable due to its position between the Southern Ocean and the Outback. Average maxima vary from 29.3 °C (84.7 °F) in January to 16.5 °C (61.7 °F) in July, and average minima fluctuate between 16.1 °C (61.0 °F) in January and February and 8.5 °C (47.3 °F) in July. Annual precipitation is rather low, averaging 377.4 mm (14.86 in), spread across 101.7 precipitation days. The town has 115.5 clear days and 103.6 cloudy days annually.

Extreme temperatures have ranged from 47.2 °C (117.0 °F) on 23 January 1982 to −1.7 °C (28.9 °F) on 9 July 1959, whilst the wettest month has been June 1890 with 190.8 millimetres or 7.51 inches, and the wettest day 14 February 2014 with 109.0 millimetres or 4.29 inches. Annual rainfalls have ranged from 193.8 millimetres or 7.63 inches in 1959 to 633.4 millimetres or 24.94 inches in 1992.

Climate data for Streaky Bay (32º48'36"S, 134º12'00"E, 45 m AMSL) (1926–2024 normals, extremes 1957–2025, rainfall since 1865)
Month	Jan	Feb	Mar	Apr	May	Jun	Jul	Aug	Sep	Oct	Nov	Dec	Year
Record high °C (°F)	47.2 (117.0)	44.0 (111.2)	42.8 (109.0)	38.1 (100.6)	31.0 (87.8)	27.3 (81.1)	24.0 (75.2)	30.6 (87.1)	37.5 (99.5)	40.2 (104.4)	42.9 (109.2)	47.1 (116.8)	47.2 (117.0)
Mean daily maximum °C (°F)	29.3 (84.7)	29.0 (84.2)	27.2 (81.0)	23.7 (74.7)	20.1 (68.2)	17.2 (63.0)	16.5 (61.7)	17.6 (63.7)	20.3 (68.5)	23.0 (73.4)	25.6 (78.1)	27.4 (81.3)	23.1 (73.5)
Mean daily minimum °C (°F)	16.1 (61.0)	16.1 (61.0)	14.7 (58.5)	12.8 (55.0)	10.8 (51.4)	9.1 (48.4)	8.5 (47.3)	8.8 (47.8)	9.9 (49.8)	11.4 (52.5)	13.3 (55.9)	14.9 (58.8)	12.2 (54.0)
Record low °C (°F)	7.9 (46.2)	8.3 (46.9)	6.0 (42.8)	4.0 (39.2)	1.4 (34.5)	0.2 (32.4)	−1.1 (30.0)	0.6 (33.1)	2.3 (36.1)	3.3 (37.9)	2.4 (36.3)	6.1 (43.0)	−1.1 (30.0)
Average rainfall mm (inches)	12.2 (0.48)	14.5 (0.57)	14.7 (0.58)	23.8 (0.94)	46.0 (1.81)	61.9 (2.44)	60.5 (2.38)	49.5 (1.95)	34.9 (1.37)	25.8 (1.02)	18.7 (0.74)	15.0 (0.59)	377.5 (14.87)
Average rainy days (≥ 0.2 mm)	3.3	3.1	4.2	7.0	11.7	14.3	15.6	14.0	10.5	8.0	5.7	4.3	101.7
Average afternoon relative humidity (%)	41	42	45	50	58	64	64	59	54	48	44	43	51
Average dew point °C (°F)	12.5 (54.5)	12.5 (54.5)	12.2 (54.0)	11.0 (51.8)	10.2 (50.4)	9.1 (48.4)	8.4 (47.1)	8.0 (46.4)	8.5 (47.3)	8.7 (47.7)	9.8 (49.6)	11.0 (51.8)	10.2 (50.3)
Source: Bureau of Meteorology (1926–2024 normals, extremes 1957–2025, rainfall since 1865)

== Economy ==
Agriculture and fishing have long been the primary industries of the Streaky Bay region, with modern aquaculture now playing a large part in the local economy. The local economy is strongly dominated by agriculture, with an emphasis on wheat, barley and other cereals as well as sheep. Due to the relatively arid conditions, dryland farming techniques are successfully applied. Recent diversification has seen the successful testing of Damara sheep, Boer goats and olives which all offer potential future investments.

Commercial fishing has played a major role in the economy of the area since the early 1900s, with Snapper and King George Whiting being the main targets of fishermen. More recently, aquaculture of oysters and abalone has also expanded and thrived in the waters of Streaky Bay.

Tourism is an ever-growing component of the local economy, with town numbers swelling during the summer holidays and at Easter. Tourists are attracted by the many natural attractions of the area as well as a host of recreational activities. The most popular of these is undoubtedly recreational fishing, with hundreds of anglers flocking to the area to sample the renowned whiting on offer. Beach, rock and boat fishing are available, with a recently built boat ramp to cater for the boaters wishing to explore the area. King George whiting, Snapper and Blue Swimmer Crabs are the most commonly targeted species, with many more available. Other activities include hiking, surfing, snorkelling and scuba diving, with guided charters being available.

== Community ==
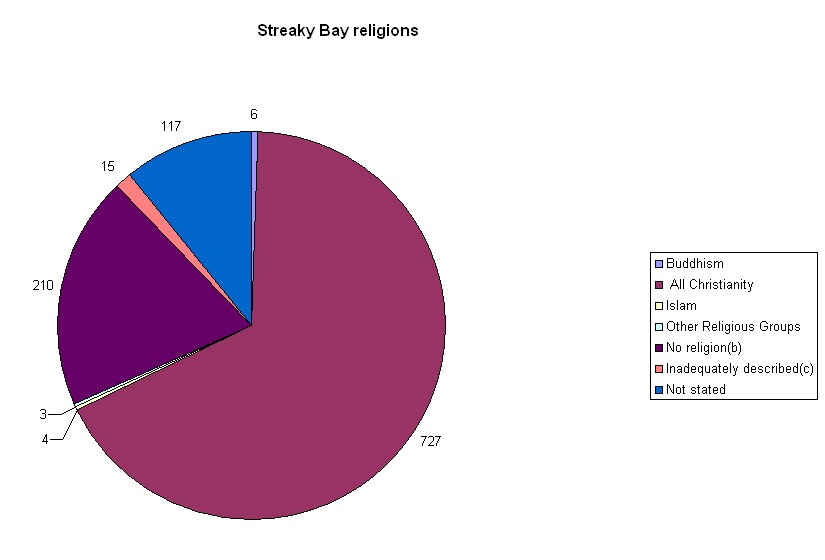
Pie chart showing religion in Streaky Bay as it was in 2001

In the 2021 census, Streaky Bay had a population of 1,436. The majority (84.3%) of residents were born in Australia, with the other 226 born overseas, primarily in the United Kingdom. The most common response for religion was "No Religion" 47.1%, followed by Catholic 17.1%, and Anglican 12%.

In the 2016 census, Streaky Bay had a population of 1,378. The majority (85.4%) of residents were born in Australia, with the other 206 born overseas, primarily in the United Kingdom. The most common response for religion was "No Religion" 32.4%, followed by Catholic 22.2%, and Anglican 16.6%.

In the 2011 census, Streaky Bay had a population of 1,625. The majority (86%) of residents were born in Australia, with the other 223 born overseas, primarily in the United Kingdom. The most common response for religion was "No Religion" 26.6%, followed by Catholic 22.7%, and Anglican 17.2%.

There are several churches in the area as well as a variety of active sports clubs, including football, cricket, bowls, netball, golf and a swimming pool. The district has strong health and education services in the form of the Streaky Bay Hospital, the local Area School and public library.

== Government ==
Streaky Bay and its districts, including settlements such as Sceale Bay comprise the District Council of Streaky Bay local government area. Streaky Bay is included in the state electoral district of Flinders and the federal division of Grey.

== Transport ==
Transport to and from Streaky Bay is usually done by car via the Flinders Highway, but bus services to and from Adelaide do operate, as does the Streaky Bay Airport. The Streaky Bay Airport is situated approximately 10 kilometres to the east of the town (Streaky Bay to Port Lincoln Highway). The facilities are open 24 hours a day with pilot activated, fully automated lighting facilities available. From 17 April 2009 Banksia Adventures will start a charter service to Adelaide with a plane from Renaissance Air every Friday and Sunday plus one morning and evening return flights on the third Wednesday of each month Residents and visitors are able to also access flights from either Ceduna Airport or Port Lincoln Airport.
