= Yellabinna =

Yellabinna may refer to:

- Yellabinna (biogeographic subregion), a sub-region of the Great Victoria Desert - refer Interim Biogeographic Regionalisation for Australia#G
- Yellabinna Regional Reserve, a protected area in South Australia
- Yellabinna Wilderness Protection Area, a protected area in South Australia
- Yellabinna, South Australia, a locality
