= Boondina Conservation Park =

Protected area in South Australia

- IUCN category VI (protected area with sustainable use of natural resources)
- Location within South Australia
- Location: South Australia
- Nearest city: Fowlers Bay.
- Coordinates: 31°40′33″S 132°35′16″E
- Area: 125.55 km^{2} (48.48 sq mi)
- Established: 11 November 1993
- Governing body: Department for Environment and Water

Boondina Conservation Park is a protected area in the Australian state of South Australia located in the west of the state in the gazetted locality of Yellabinna about 38 kilometres (24 mi) north-east of the town centre in Fowlers Bay.

The land first acquired protected area status on 11 November 1993 as part of a conservation reserve dedicated under the Crown Lands Act 1929 and known as the Yumbarra Conservation Reserve. In 2006, the conservation reserve was resumed with part of the resumed crown land being constituted as the Boondina Conservation Park.

Its name is derived from the “native name associated with the area by the local Aboriginal people” and which “draws its significance from local water sources”.

As of 2013, the conservation park is managed as part of a larger group of protected areas known as the Yellabinna Reserves which also includes Pureba Conservation Park, the Yellabinna Regional Reserve, the Yellabinna Wilderness Protection Area and the Yumbarra Conservation Park. The management approach for the Yellabinna Reserves is described by the managing authority as being “an integrated and collaborative approach to the conservation of over three million hectares of mallee woodland”. No visitors facilities are provided within the conservation park nor is there access for public vehicles. Mineral exploration and mining is permitted in the conservation park.

A co-management agreement signed by the Far West Coast Aboriginal Corporation and the Government of South Australia in 2013 in respect to the Yumbarra Conservation Park also provides for the corporation to give advice on the management of the conservation park and other reserves in the west of the state. The conservation park is one of those in the west of the state where Aboriginal people are permitted to hunt for and gather food.

The conservation park is classified as an IUCN Category VI protected area.

== See also ==
- Protected areas of South Australia
