= Acacia inaequiloba =

Scientific classification
- Kingdom: Plantae
- Clade: Embryophytes
- Clade: Tracheophytes
- Clade: Spermatophytes
- Clade: Angiosperms
- Clade: Eudicots
- Clade: Rosids
- Order: Fabales
- Family: Fabaceae
- Subfamily: Caesalpinioideae
- Clade: Mimosoid clade
- Genus: Acacia
- Species: A. inaequiloba

Binomial name
- Acacia inaequiloba W.Fitzg.
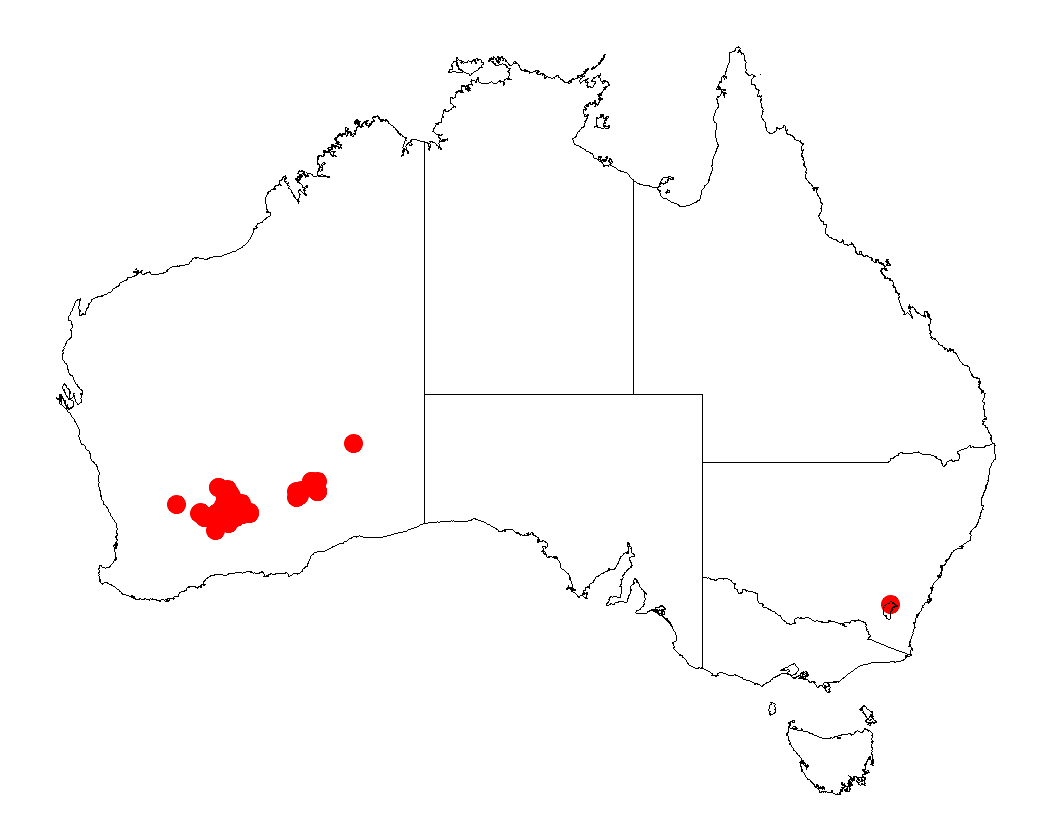
- Occurrence data from AVH

Synonyms
- Racosperma inaequilobium (W.Fitzg.) Pedley

Species of legume

Acacia inaequiloba is a species of flowering plant in the family Fabaceae and is endemic to inland areas of Western Australia. It is a compact spiny shrub with many stems, obliquely egg-shaped to elliptic phyllodes, spherical heads of light golden yellow flowers, and rounded, thinly leathery to crusty pods.

== Description ==
Acacia inaequiloba is a compact spiny, multistemmed shrub that typically grows to a height of 0.3 m (1 ft 0 in). Its branchlets are more or less straight, erect, rigid, often covered with a powdery bloom but usually glabrous. The phyllodes are variably shaped, often asymmetrically triangular with the narrower end towards the base, to wedge-shaped or very narrowly oblong to elliptic, 10–45 mm (0.39–1.77 in) long and 2–10 mm (0.079–0.394 in) wide, sharply pointed, glaucous and usually glabrous. The midrib is near the upper edge of the phyllode and the side veins are obscure.

The flowers are borne in a single spherical to oblong head in leaf axils on a peduncle usually 5–10 mm (0.20–0.39 in) long, each head with 12 to 21 light- to mid-golden yellow flowers. Flowering occurs from July to September, and the pods are wavy, prominently rounded over the seeds, up to 75 mm (3.0 in) long and 4–5 mm (0.16–0.20 in) wide and thinly leathery to crusty and glabrous. The seeds are egg-shaped to elliptic, mottled black and brown, about 3 mm (0.12 in) long with a conspicuous aril.

== Taxonomy ==
Acacia inaequiloba was first formally described in 1912 by William Vincent Fitzgerald in the Journal of Botany, British and Foreign from specimens collected by Richard Helms in the Great Victoria Desert during the Elder Exploring Expedition. The specific epithet (inaequiloba) means unequal-lobed, referring to the sepals.

== Distribution ==
This species of wattle occurs in the Southern Cross-Coolgardie and Queen Victoria Spring-Streich Mound districts (the latter, about 200 km (120 mi) to the north east of Kalgoorlie), where it grows on sandplains in sandy lateritic soils in the Avon Wheatbelt, Coolgardie, Great Victoria Desert and Murchison bioregions of inland Western Australia.

== Conservation status ==
Acacia inaequiloba is listed as 'not threatened' by the Western Australian Government Department of Biodiversity, Conservation and Attractions.

== See also ==
- List of Acacia species
