= Jacinth-Ambrosia Mine =

Zircon mine northwest of Ceduna in South Australia

Jacinth-Ambrosia
- Location within South Australia
- Location: Yellabinna, 200km northwest of Ceduna, South Australia, Australia; 30.90°S 132.21°E
- Products: zircon, rutile, ilmenite
- Discovered: 2004
- Opened: 2009
- Company: Iluka Resources
- Website: www.iluka.com/operations-resource-development/operations/jacinth-ambrosia

The Jacinth-Ambrosia Mine is a mine operated by Iluka Resources in South Australia. The primary output of the mine is zircon, and it is the largest zircon mine in the world.

== History ==
The mineral sands deposit is in tertiary-age sediments of the Eucla Basin.

The mine exploits both the Jacinth and Ambrosia deposits, which were discovered in 2004. Mining commenced in 2009.

== Operations ==
The mine operates inside of the Yellabinna Regional Reserve, and is the first mine in South Australia to be approved for development in a regional reserve. Seed and topsoil are collected and stored for later site rehabilitation.

Ore is processed onsite to produce a concentrate which is transported to Thevenard then shipped to a plant at Narngulu in Western Australia for further processing at the Narngulu mineral separation plant there into zircon, rutile, and ilmenite. The concentrate is transported to Thevenard by road, with approximately 18 B-triple trucks per day carrying 96 tonnes each. A 100 km (62 mi) unsealed haul road was constructed for the mine, along with upgrading 80 km (50 mi) of the Ooldea Road.

The mine is served by Jacinth Ambrosia Airport. In 2018, around 70 workers were operating on a fly-in fly-out basis. As of January 2026, 110 workers are employed at the mine.

Jacinth-Ambrosia mine is the largest zircon mine in the world, producing around 25 per cent of the global supply of zircon.
