= Jacinth Ambrosia Airport =

- IATA: none; ICAO: YJAC

Summary
- Airport type: Private
- Operator: Iluka Resources Limited
- Location: Jacinth Ambrosia Mine
- Elevation AMSL: 419 ft / 128 m
- Coordinates: 30°54′06″S 132°11′00″E

Map
- Location in South Australia

Runways
Direction	Length		Surface
Direction	m	ft	Surface
14/32	1,800	5,906	Gravel
- Sources: Australian AIP

Jacinth Ambrosia Airport (ICAO: YJAC) serves Jacinth Ambrosia Mine 200 kilometres (120 mi) northwest of Ceduna, South Australia.

== Airlines and destinations ==
Airlines	Destinations
Pel-Air	Charter: Adelaide, Ceduna

== See also ==
- List of airports in South Australia
- Yellabinna, South Australia
