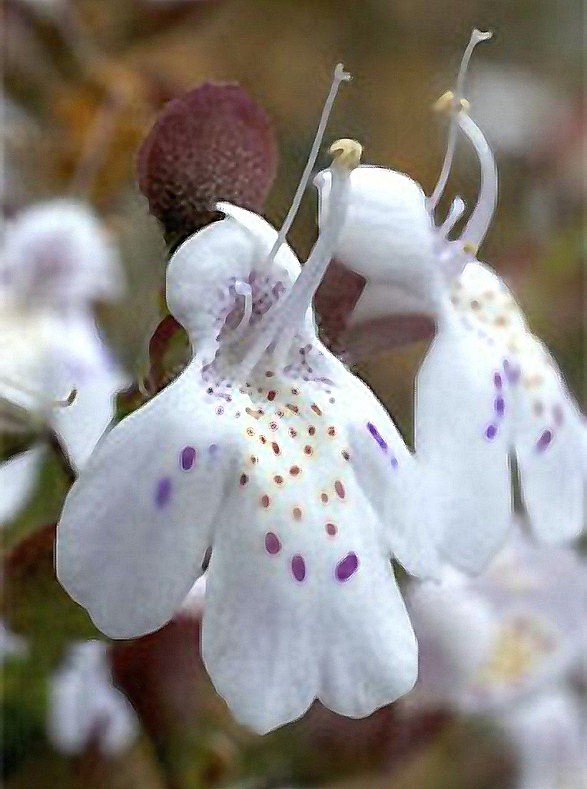

Scientific classification
- Kingdom: Plantae
- Clade: Tracheophytes
- Clade: Angiosperms
- Clade: Eudicots
- Clade: Asterids
- Order: Lamiales
- Family: Lamiaceae
- Genus: Prostanthera
- Species: P. prostantheroides

Binomial name
- Prostanthera prostantheroides (F.Muell.) T.C.Wilson, Henwood & B.J.Conn
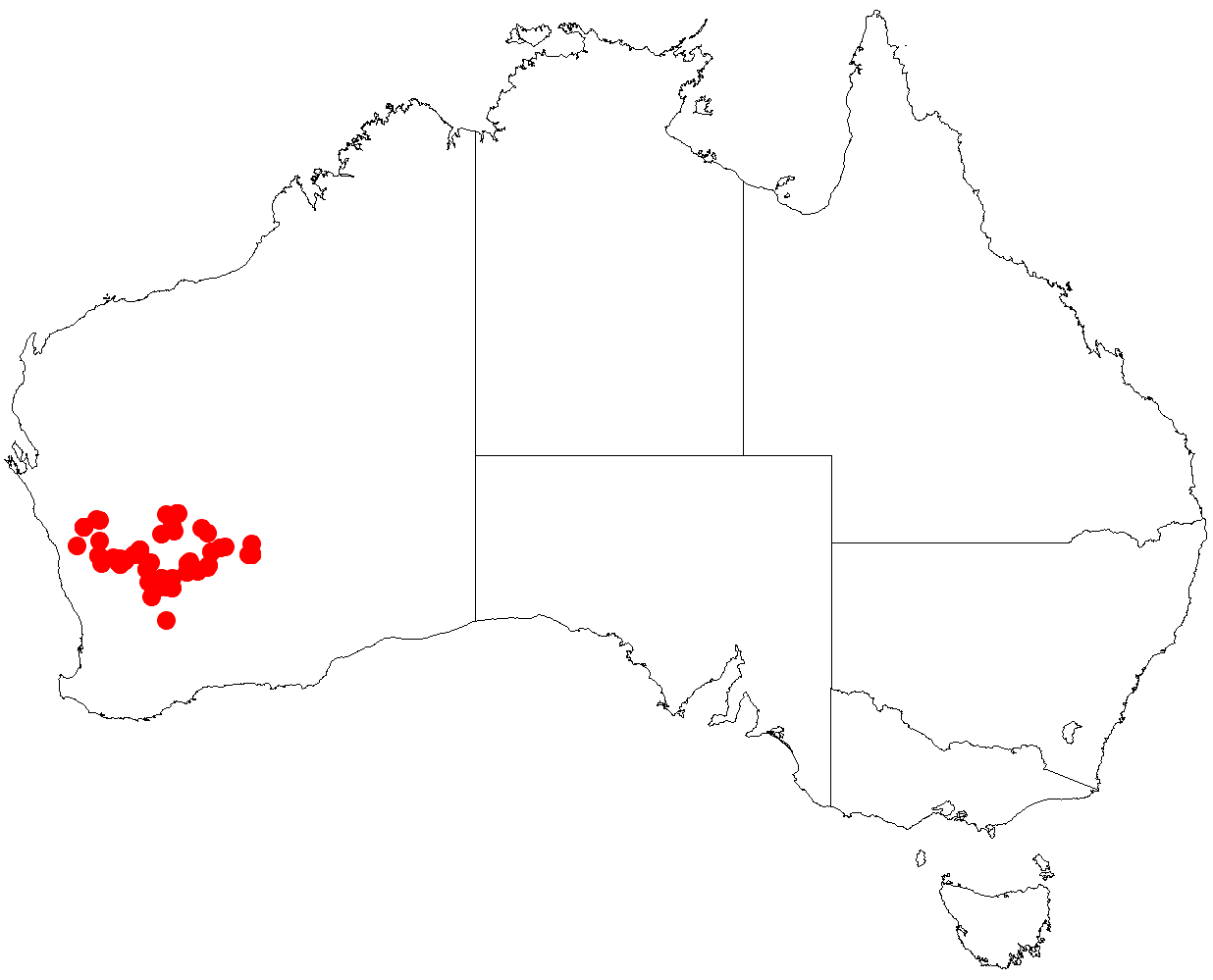
- Occurrence data from AVH

Synonyms
- Prostanthera wrixoni F.Muell. nom. inval., nom. alt.; Wrixonia prostantheroides F.Muell.; Prostanthera schultzii auct. non F.Muell. ex Tate: Green, J.W. (1981)

= Prostanthera prostantheroides =

Species of shrub

Prostanthera prostantheroides is a plant in the family Lamiaceae and is endemic to Western Australia. It is a shrub with heart-shaped to round leaves and usually white flowers with purple spots inside the petal tube.

== Description ==
Prostanthera prostantheroides is a small shrub that typically grows to a height of up to 50 cm (20 in) and has stems that become spiny with age. The leaves are heart-shaped to round, 1–4 mm (0.039–0.157 in) long and about 1 mm (0.039 in) wide on a very short petiole. The flowers are arranged at the ends of the branches on pedicels 1–4 mm (0.039–0.157 in) long with bracteoles 3–4 mm (0.12–0.16 in) long at the base but that fall off as the flower develops. The sepals form a tube 3–3.5 mm (0.12–0.14 in) long with two lobes, the upper lobe about 3.5 mm (0.14 in) wide and the lower lobe about 3 mm (0.12 in) wide. The petals are 8–15 mm (0.31–0.59 in) long, white with purple, mauve to violet or red spots inside, and form a tube about 7 mm (0.28 in) long. The lower middle lobe is about 5 mm (0.20 in) wide and the side lobes are about 4 mm (0.16 in) long and 3 mm (0.12 in) wide, the upper lobes 3–3.5 mm (0.12–0.14 in) long and 2–2.5 mm (0.079–0.098 in) wide. Flowering occurs in August, September or October.

== Taxonomy ==
This species was first formally described in 1876 by Ferdinand von Mueller who gave it the name Wrixonia prostantheroides in his book Fragmenta phytographiae Australiae, based on plant material collected from the vicinity of Mount Churchman by Jess Young. In 2012, Trevor Wilson, Murray Henwood and Barry Conn changed the name to Prostanthera prostantheroides in the journal Telopea.

== Distribution ==
Prostanthera prostantheroides occurs in the Avon Wheatbelt, Coolgardie, Murchison and Yalgoo biogeographic regions of Western Australia.

== Conservation status ==
This mintbush is classified as "not threatened" by the Western Australian Government Department of Parks and Wildlife.
