= Great Victoria Desert =

Desert in Western Australia and South Australia

Coordinates: 29°09′S 129°16′E

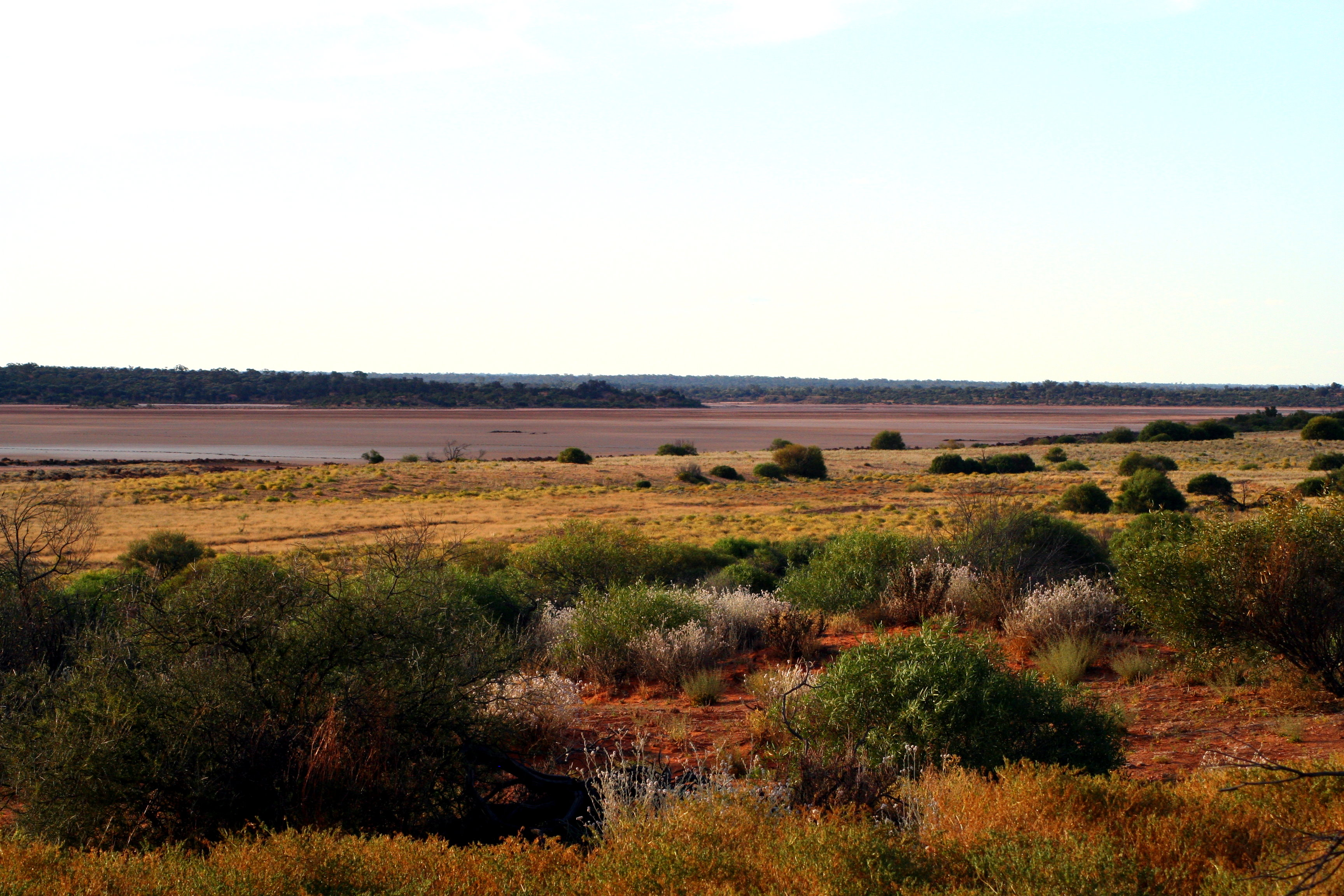
- Serpentine Lakes, South Australia

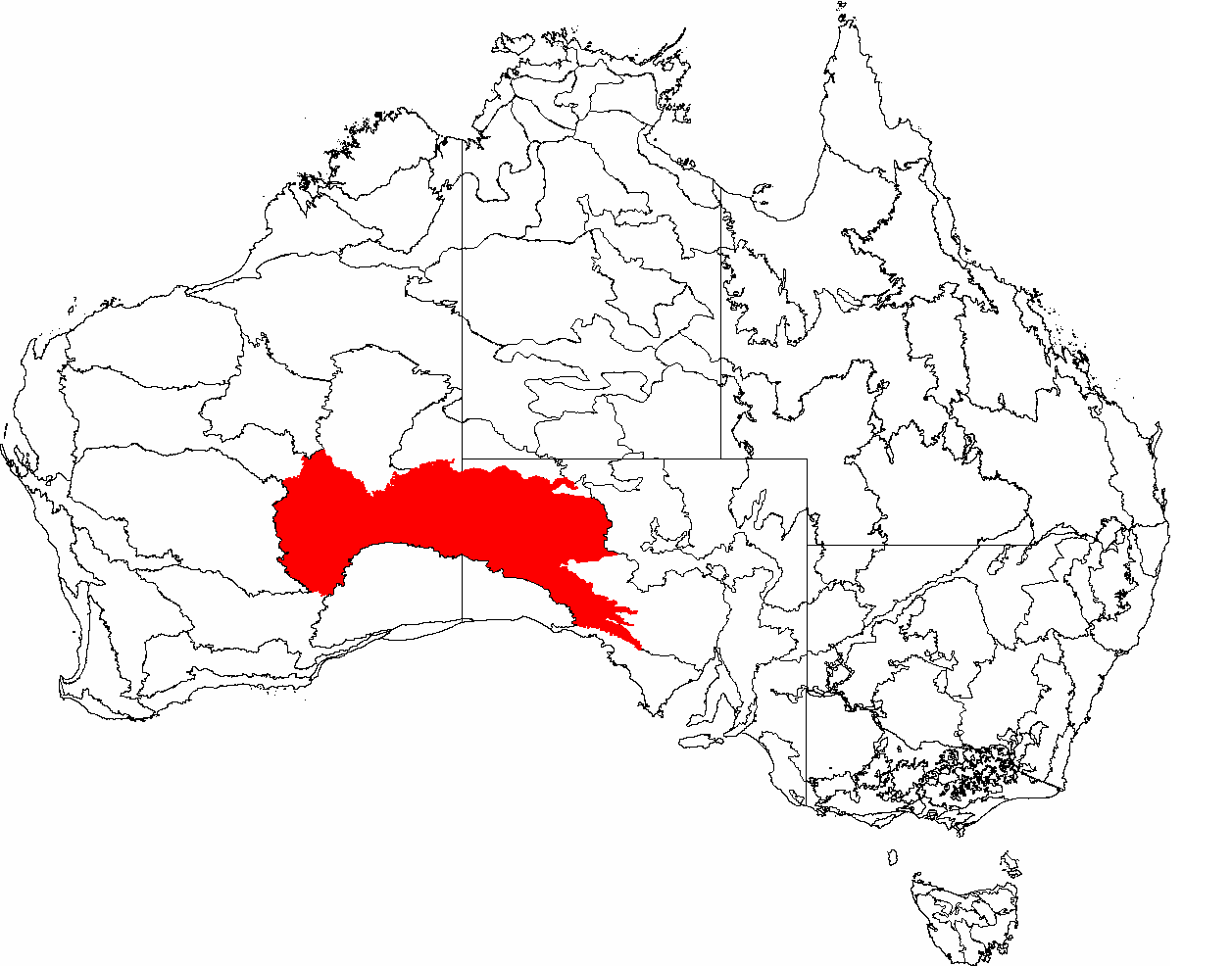
- Map of the IBRA regions, with the Great Victoria Desert in red

Ecology
- Realm: Australasian
- Biome: Deserts and xeric shrublands
- Borders: List: Central Ranges xeric scrub; Coolgardie woodlands; Eyre and Yorke mallee; Great Sandy-Tanami desert; Gibson Desert; Nullarbor Plains xeric shrublands; Tirari-Sturt stony desert; Western Australian mulga shrublands

Geography
- Area: 422,466 km^{2} (163,115 mi^{2})
- Country: Australia
- States: South Australia; Western Australia

Conservation
- Conservation status: Relatively stable/intact
- Protected: 129,367 km^{2} (31%)

The Great Victoria Desert is a sparsely populated desert ecoregion and interim Australian bioregion in Western Australia and South Australia.

== History ==
In 1875, British-born Australian explorer Ernest Giles became the first European to cross the desert. He named the desert after the then-reigning monarch, Queen Victoria. In 1891, David Lindsey's expedition travelled across this area from north to south. Frank Hann was looking for gold in this area between 1903 and 1908. Len Beadell explored the area in the 1960s.

== Location and description ==
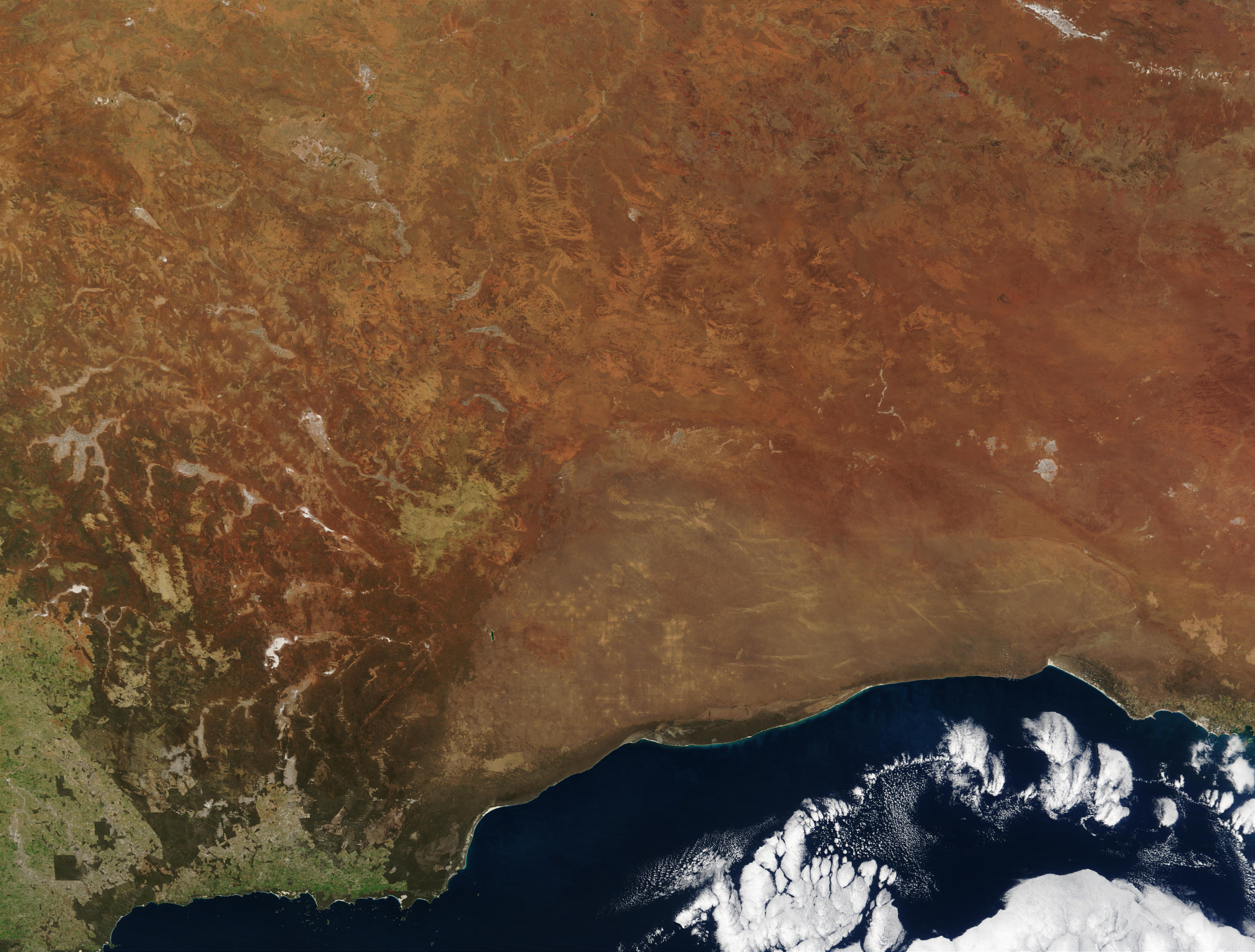
NASA - Visible Earth, the Great Victoria Desert is in the center of the image, north of the Nullarbor Plain.

The Great Victoria is the largest desert in Australia, and consists of many small sandhills, grassland plains, areas with a closely packed surface of pebbles (called desert pavement or gibber plains), and salt lakes. It is over 700 km (430 mi) wide (from west to east) and covers an area of 348,750 km^{2} (134,650 sq mi) from the Eastern Goldfields region of Western Australia to the Gawler Ranges in South Australia. The Western Australian mulga shrublands ecoregion lies to the west, the Little Sandy Desert to the northwest, the Gibson Desert and the Central Ranges xeric shrublands to the north, the Tirari-Sturt stony desert to the east, and the Nullarbor Plain to the south separates it from the Southern Ocean. Average annual rainfall is low and irregular, ranging from 200 to 250 mm (7.9 to 9.8 in) per year. Thunderstorms are relatively common in the Great Victoria Desert, with an average of 15–20 thunderstorms yearly. Summer daytime temperatures range from 32 to 40 °C (90 to 104 °F), while in winter, this falls to 18 to 23 °C (64 to 73 °F).

The Great Victoria desert is a World Wildlife Fund ecoregion and an Interim Biogeographic Regionalisation for Australia region of the same name.

== Habitation ==
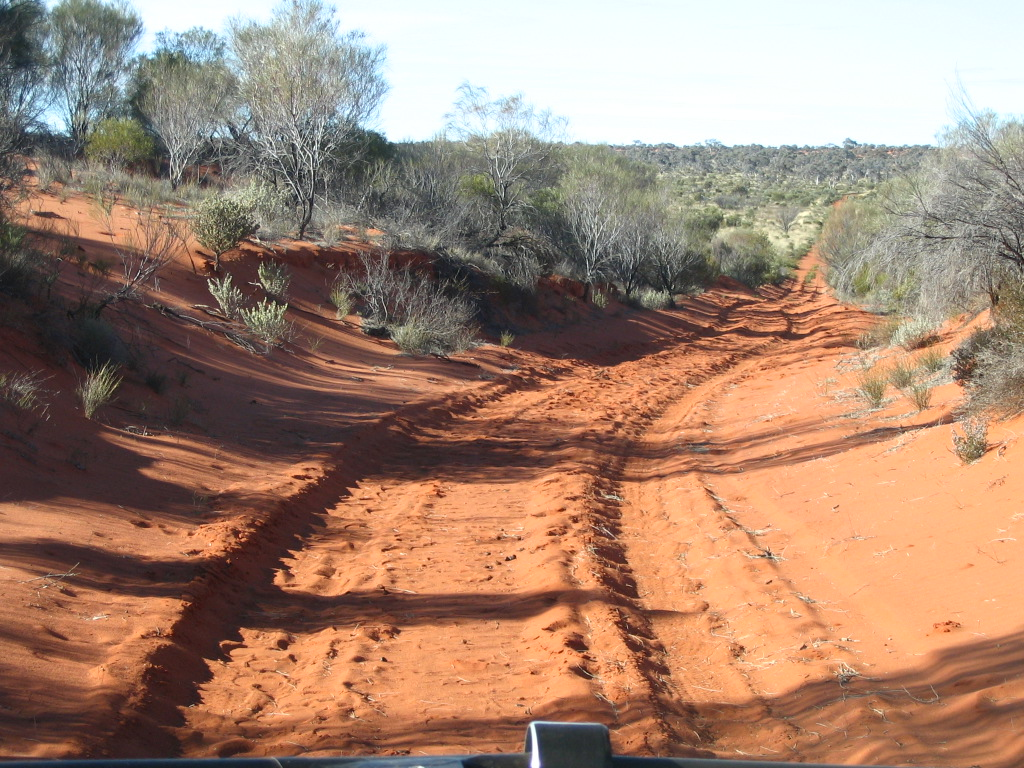
View of the Connie Sue Highway

The majority of people living in the region are Indigenous Australians from different groups, including the Kogara, the Mirning and the Pitjantjatjara. Aboriginal populations have been increasing in this region. Young Indigenous adults from the Great Victoria Desert region work in the Wilurarra Creative programs to maintain and develop their culture.

Despite its isolated location, the Great Victoria is bisected by very rough tracks, including the Connie Sue Highway and the Anne Beadell Highway. Human activity has included some mining and nuclear weapons testing.

== Flora ==
Only the hardiest of plants can survive in much of this environment. Between the sand ridges, the areas of wooded steppe consist of Eucalyptus gongylocarpa, Eucalyptus youngiana, and Acacia aneura (mulga) shrubs scattered over areas of resilient spinifex grasses, particularly Triodia basedowii.

== Fauna ==
The wildlife that adapted to these harsh conditions include a few large birds or mammals such as emus and red kangaroos. However, the desert does sustain many types of lizards, including the vulnerable great desert skink (Egernia kintorei), the Central Ranges taipan (discovered in 2007), and a number of small marsupials, including the endangered sandhill dunnart (Sminthopsis psammophila) and the crest-tailed mulgara (Dasycercus cristicauda). One way to survive here is to burrow into the sands, as a number of the desert's animals, including the southern marsupial mole (Notoryctes typhlops), and the water-holding frog do. Birds include the chestnut-breasted whiteface (Aphelocephala pectoralis) found on the eastern edge of the desert and the malleefowl of Mamungari Conservation Park. Predators of the desert include the dingo (as the desert is north of the Dingo Fence) and two large monitor lizards, the perentie (Varanus giganteus) and the sand goanna (Varanus gouldii).

== Conservation and threats ==
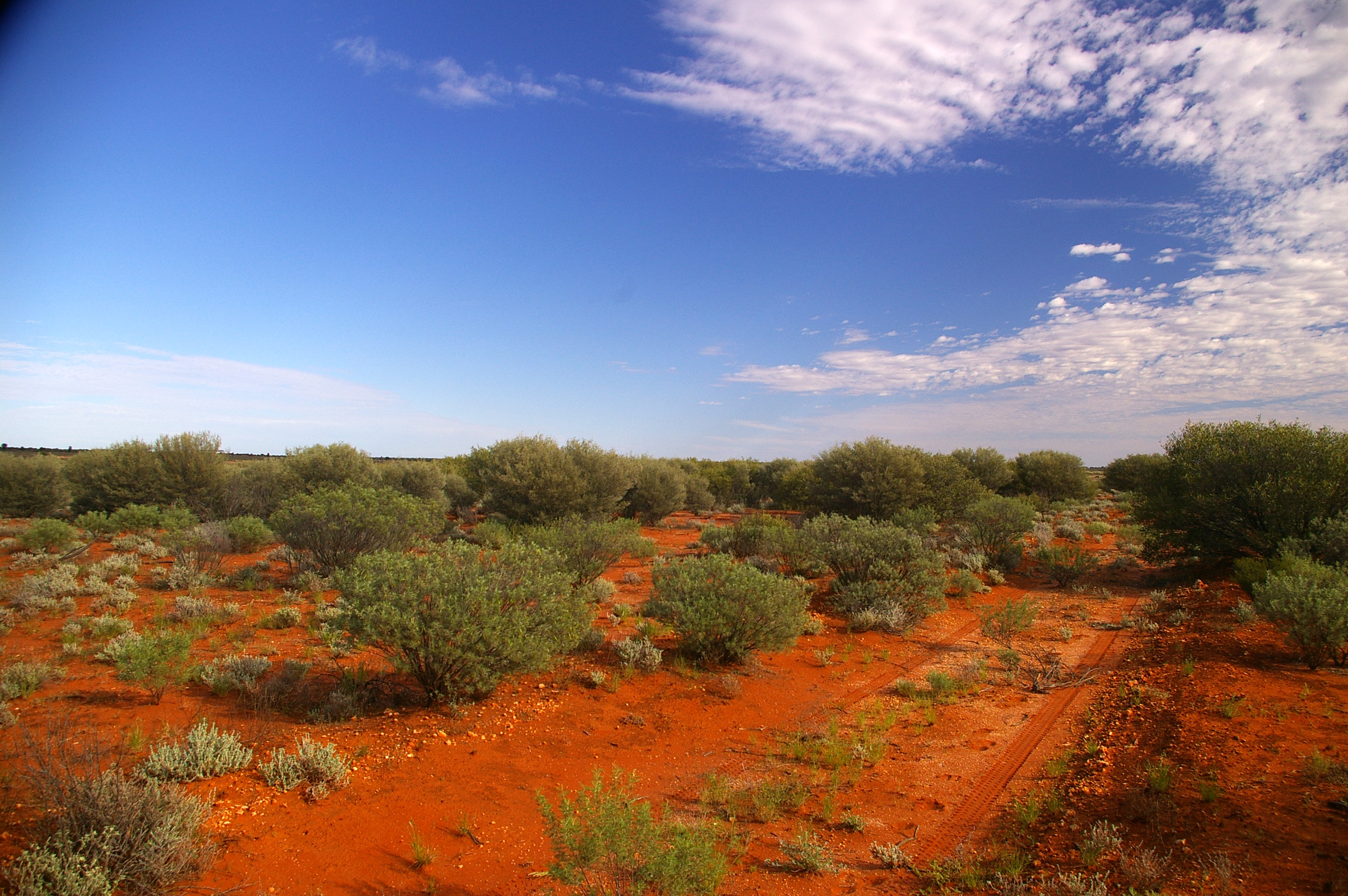
Former British nuclear test site at Maralinga

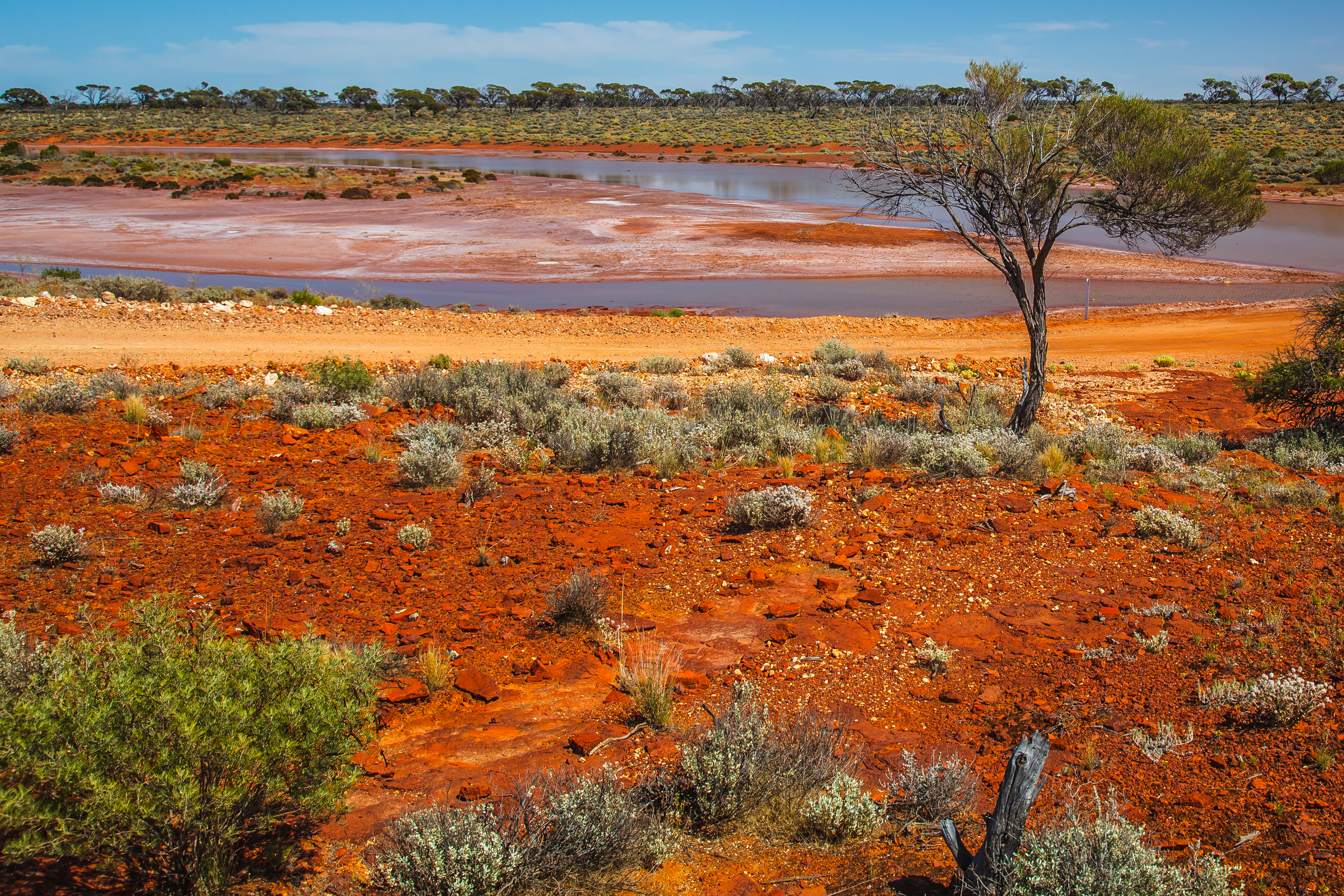
Lake Gairdner National Park

As this area has had very limited use for agriculture, many habitats remain largely undisturbed. 31% of the desert is in protected areas, including Mamungari Conservation Park (formerly known as Unnamed Conservation Park) in South Australia, a large area of pristine arid zone wilderness, which possesses cultural significance and is one of the 14 World Biosphere Reserves in Australia. Habitat is also preserved in the large Aboriginal local government area of Anangu Pitjantjatjara Yankunytjatjara in South Australia and in the Great Victoria Desert Nature Reserve of Western Australia. Protected areas include:

- Antara-Sandy Bore Indigenous Protected Area
- Apara-Makiri-Punti Indigenous Protected Area
- De La Poer Range Nature Reserve
- Gawler Ranges National Park
- Gawler Ranges Conservation Park
- Great Victoria Desert Nature Reserve
- Kalka-Pipalyatjara Indigenous Protected Area
- Lake Gairdner National Park
- Mamungari Conservation Park
- Mount Willoughby Indigenous Protected Area
- Neale Junction Nature Reserve
- Ngaanyatjarra Indigenous Protected Area
- Nullarbor Regional Reserve
- Plumridge Lakes Nature Reserve
- Pureba Conservation Park
- Queen Victoria Spring Nature Reserve
- Tallaringa Conservation Park
- Walalkara Indigenous Protected Area
- Watarru Indigenous Protected Area
- Yellabinna Regional Reserve
- Yellabinna Wilderness Protection Area
- Yeo Lake Nature Reserve
- Yumbarra Conservation Park

The nuclear weapons trials carried out by the United Kingdom at Maralinga and Emu Field in the 1950s and early 1960s have left areas contaminated with plutonium-239 and other radioactive material.

== See also ==
- Deserts of Australia
- List of deserts by area
- Tallaringa Conservation Park
