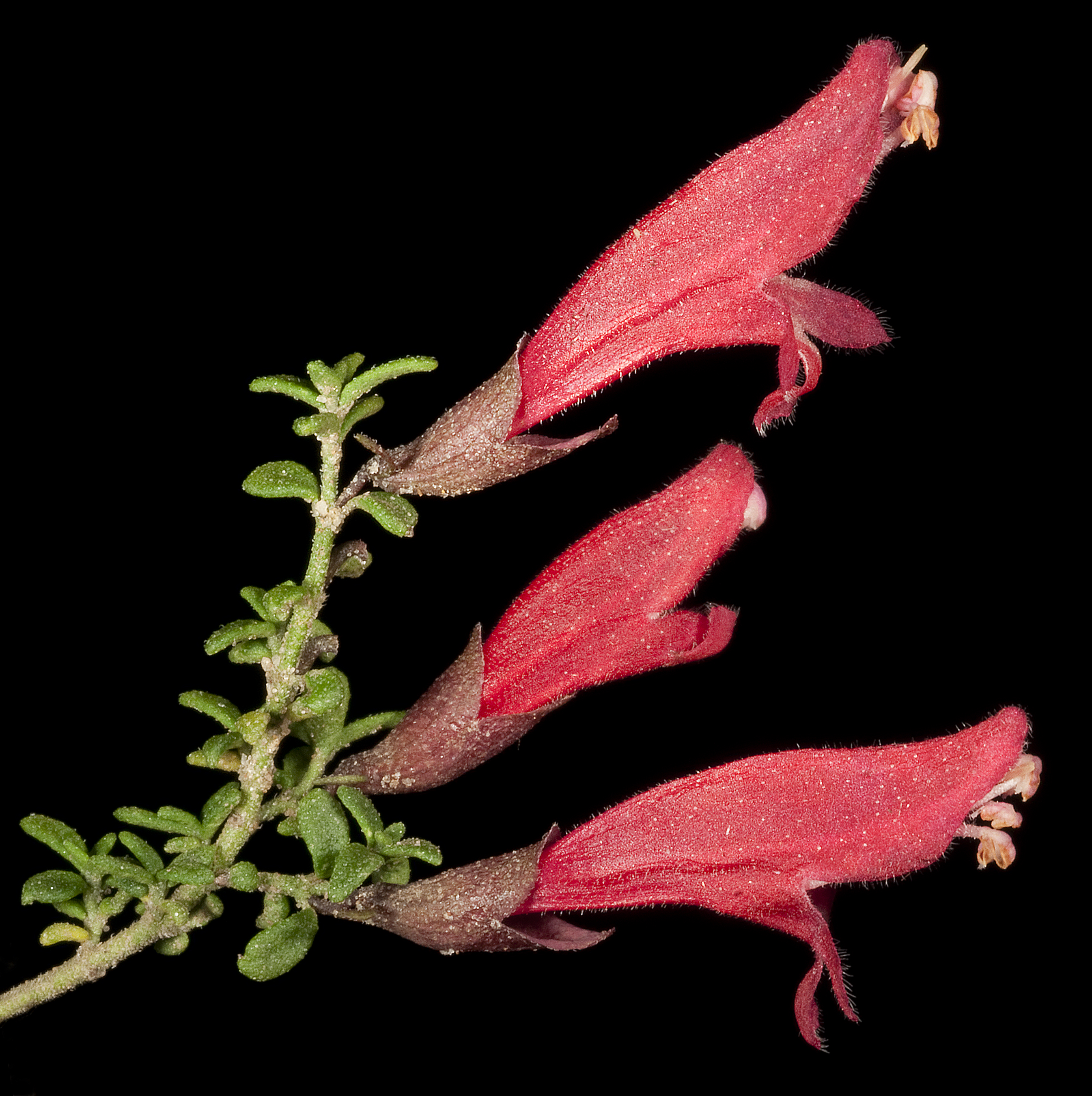

Scientific classification
- Kingdom: Plantae
- Clade: Tracheophytes
- Clade: Angiosperms
- Clade: Eudicots
- Clade: Asterids
- Order: Lamiales
- Family: Lamiaceae
- Genus: Prostanthera
- Species: P. grylloana

Binomial name
- Prostanthera grylloana F.Muell.
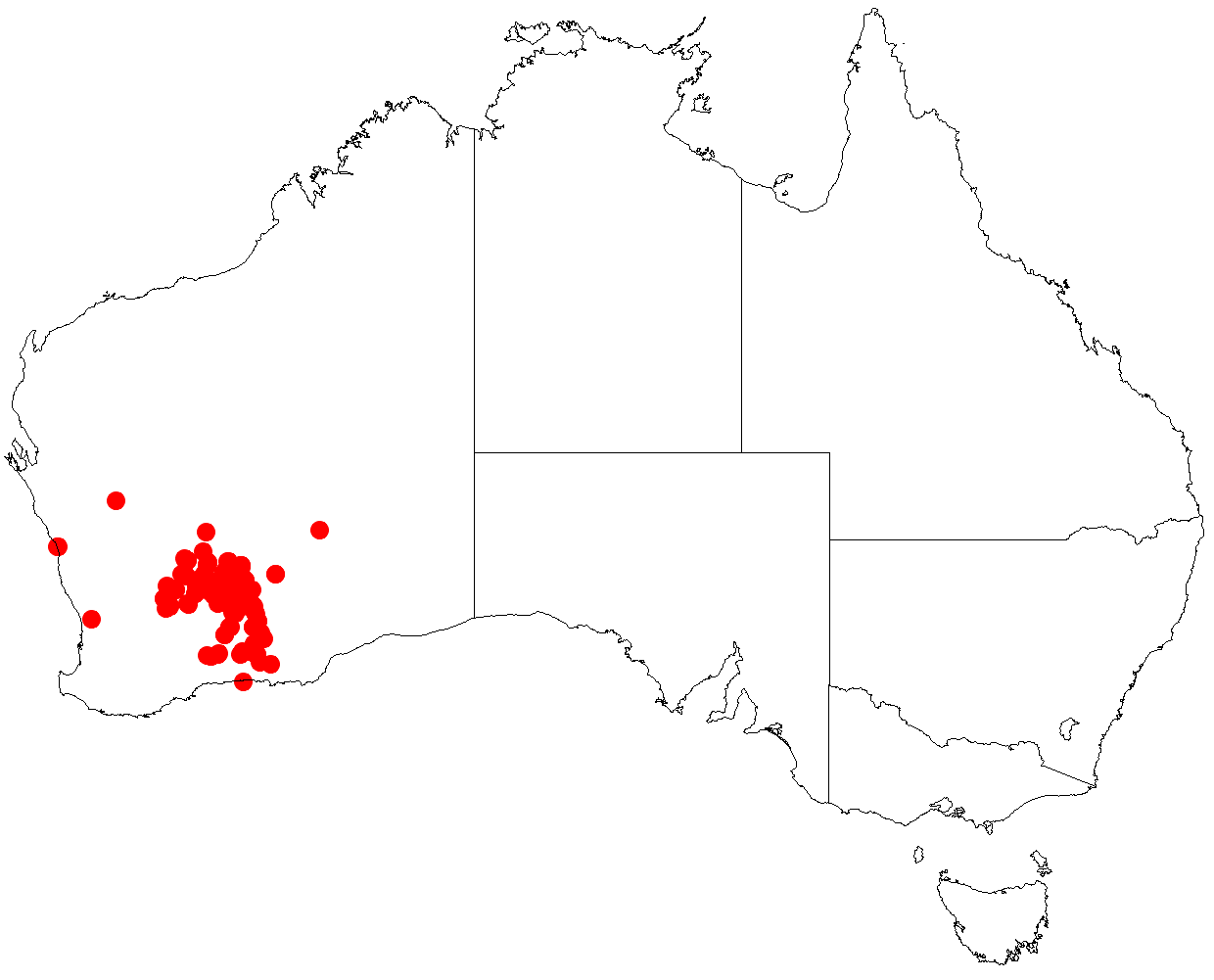
- Occurrence data from AVH

= Prostanthera grylloana =

Species of flowering plant

Prostanthera grylloana is a species of flowering plant in the family Lamiaceae and is endemic to Western Australia. It is a small, erect shrub with densely hairy branchlets, small, spatula-shaped leaves and red to pink flowers.

== Description ==
Prostanthera grylloana is an erect shrub that typically grows to a height of 0.3–1.5 m (1 ft 0 in – 4 ft 11 in) and has densely hairy branchlets. The leaves are spatula-shaped, 3–5 mm (0.12–0.20 in) long and about 2 mm (0.079 in) wide on a petiole up to about 1 mm (0.039 in) long. Both the petiole and leaf blade have a longitudinal groove so that the two sides of the leaves almost touch. The flowers are arranged singly in leaf axils, each flower on a pedicel 1–1.5 mm (0.039–0.059 in) long. The sepals are 4–6 mm (0.16–0.24 in) long and form a tube 4–4.5 mm (0.16–0.18 in) long with two more or less triangular lobes about 2 mm (0.079 in) long and 3–4 mm (0.12–0.16 in) long. The petals are red to dull medium mauve-pink, 15–20 mm (0.59–0.79 in) and fused to form a tube 10–14 mm (0.39–0.55 in) long with two lips. The lower lip has three lobes, the centre lobe more or less triangular, 5 mm (0.20 in) long and 2–3 mm (0.079–0.118 in) wide, the side lobes about 2.5 mm (0.098 in) long wide. The upper lip is 3.5–4 mm (0.14–0.16 in) long and 4 mm (0.16 in) wide with a central notch about 1 mm (0.039 in) deep. Flowering occurs in February, May or from September to December.

== Taxonomy ==
Prostanthera grylloana was first formally described in 1876 by Ferdinand von Mueller in his book Fragmenta phytographiae Australiae from specimens collected "in the desert around Ularing" by Jess Young. The specific epithet (grylloana) honours the actress Adelaide Ristori, the wife of the marchese Giuliano Capranica del Grillo.

== Distribution and habitat ==
This mintbush grows on granite outcrops and ridges and on stony hills and undulating plains in the Avon Wheatbelt, Coolgardie, Mallee and Murchison biographic regions of Western Australia.

== Conservation status ==
Prostanthera grylloana is classified as "not threatened" by the Western Australian Government Department of Parks and Wildlife.
