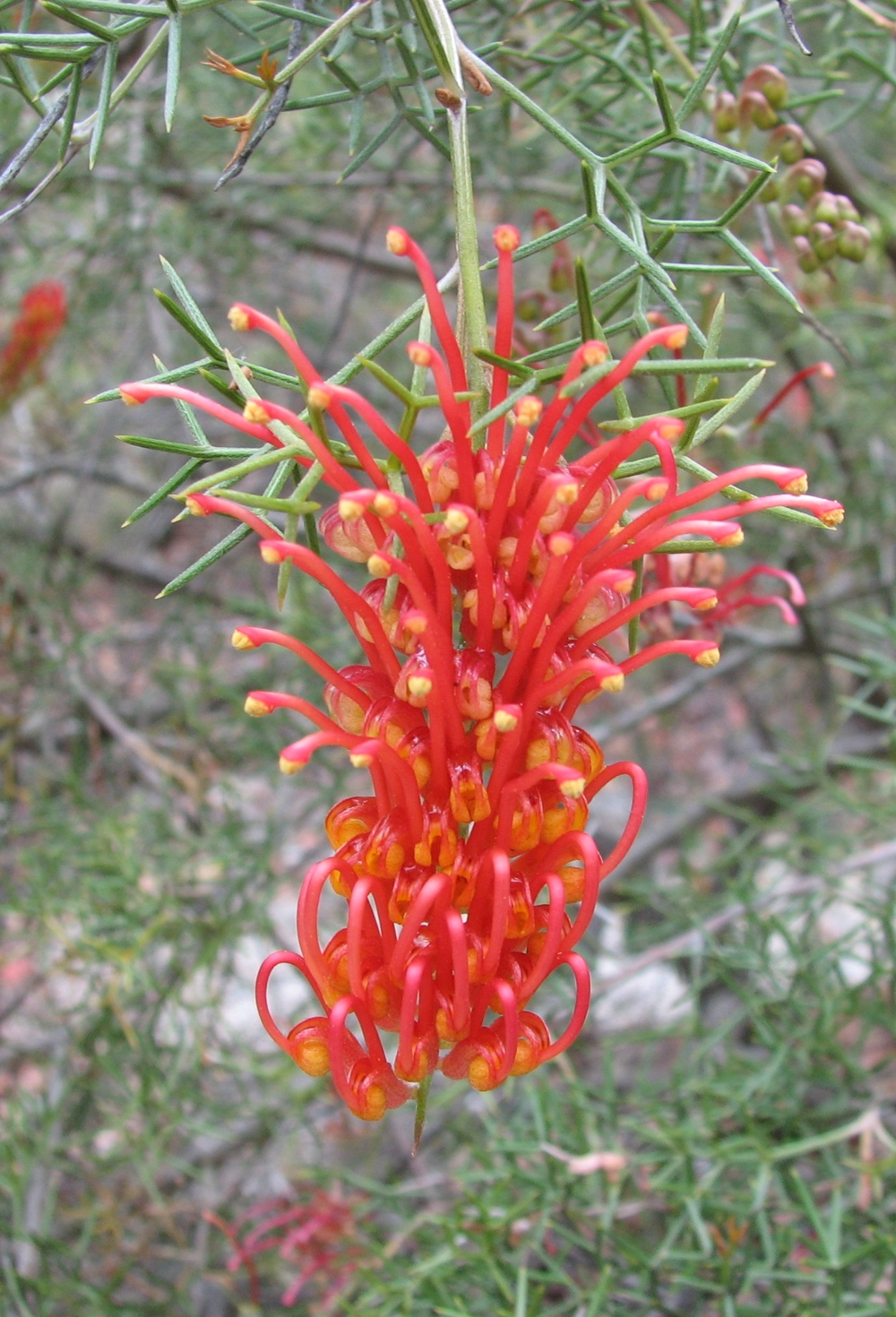
- In Maranoa Gardens

Conservation status
- Vulnerable (EPBC Act)

Scientific classification
- Kingdom: Plantae
- Clade: Tracheophytes
- Clade: Angiosperms
- Clade: Eudicots
- Order: Proteales
- Family: Proteaceae
- Genus: Grevillea
- Species: G. treueriana

Binomial name
- Grevillea treueriana F.Muell.

= Grevillea treueriana =

Mount Finke grevillea

Species of shrub endemic to South Australia

Grevillea treueriana, also known as Mount Finke grevillea or scarlet grevillea, is a species of flowering plant in the family Proteaceae and is endemic to Mount Finke in South Australia. It is a shrub with pinnatisect leaves with 3 to 7 lobes, the end lobes linear and sharply pointed, and bright scarlet flowers on one side of the floral rachis.

== Description ==
Grevillea treueriana is shrub that typically grows up to 1.5 m (4 ft 11 in) high and 2 m (6 ft 7 in) wide and has softly-hairy branchlets. Its leaves are pinnatisect, 25–35 mm (0.98–1.38 in) long with 3 to 7 lobes, the end lobes linear, 5–17 mm (0.20–0.67 in) long, 0.7–1.0 mm (0.028–0.039 in) wide and sharply pointed. The edges of the leaves are rolled under, enclosing most of the lower surface apart from the mid-vein. The flowers are arranged along one side of a rachis 35–65 mm (1.4–2.6 in) long with about 20 to 35 bright scarlet flowers, the pistil 23–27 mm (0.91–1.06 in) long. Flowering occurs from June to October and the fruit is a softly-hairy follicle 10–11 mm (0.39–0.43 in) long.

== Taxonomy ==
Grevillea treueriana was first formally described in 1875 by Ferdinand von Mueller in his Fragmenta Phytographiae Australiae from specimens collected by Jess Young. The specific epithet honours Adolph von Treuer, a German Consul to Australia in the 19th century.

== Distribution and habitat ==
Mount Finke grevillea in restricted to Mount Finke in central inland South Australia, where it grows in rocky crevices in shallow sand.

== Conservation status ==
Grevillea treueriana is listed as "vulnerable" under the Australian Government Environment Protection and Biodiversity Conservation Act 1999 and the South Australian National Parks and Wildlife Act 1972. The main threats to the species include grazing by feral animals, habitat loss, and inappropriate fire regimes.

== Use in horticulture ==
This species prefers a dry climate and well drained soil, but can be grafted on to rootstocks of Grevillea robusta or Grevillea 'Poorinda Royal Mantle' to enable cultivation in areas with higher humidity and rainfall. Plants can be propagated by taking cuttings from current seasons growth, or from seed which has been nicked with a sharp knife.
