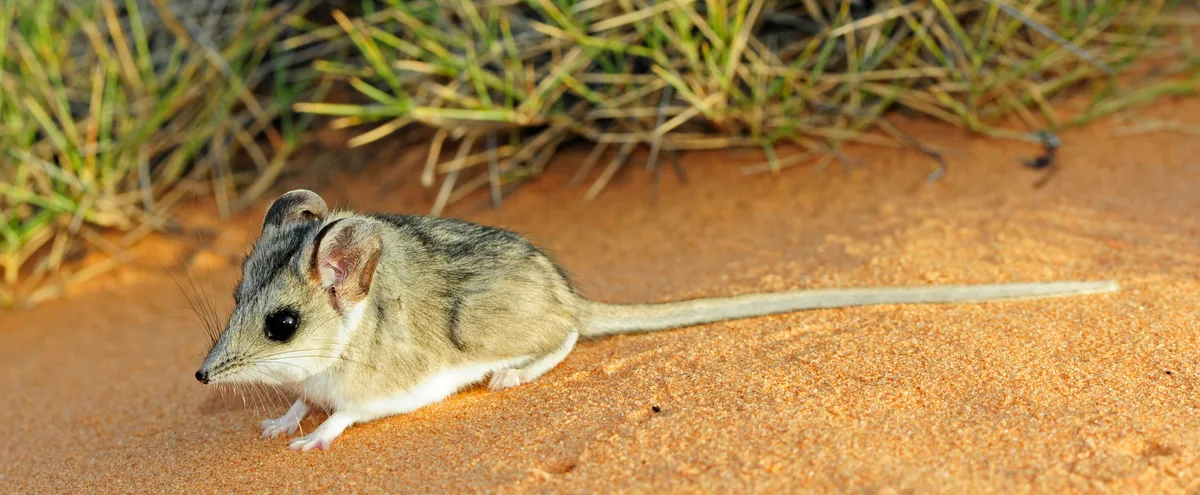

Conservation status
- Vulnerable (IUCN 3.1)
- CITES Appendix I

Scientific classification
- Kingdom: Animalia
- Phylum: Chordata
- Class: Mammalia
- Infraclass: Marsupialia
- Order: Dasyuromorphia
- Family: Dasyuridae
- Genus: Sminthopsis
- Species: S. psammophila

Binomial name
- Sminthopsis psammophila Spencer, 1895
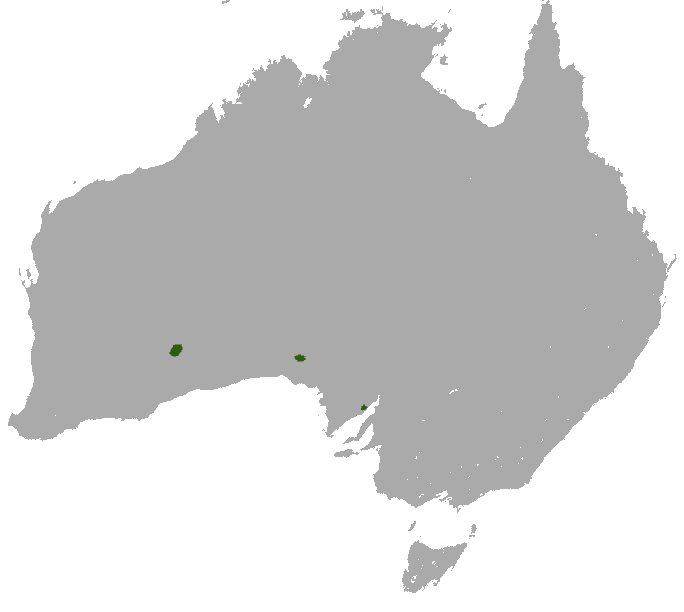
- Sandhill dunnart range

= Sandhill dunnart =

Species of marsupial

The sandhill dunnart (Sminthopsis psammophila) is a species of carnivorous Australian marsupial of the family Dasyuridae. It is known from four scattered semi-arid areas of Australia: near Lake Amadeus in Northern Territory, the central and eastern Eyre Peninsula in South Australia, the southwestern and western edges of the Great Victoria Desert in Western Australia, and at Yellabinna in South Australia.

== Description ==
The sandhill dunnart is commonly known as a species of "marsupial mouse". The genus name of dunnart was likely derived from the Noongar word "danard". It is the second largest of the 19 dunnart (Sminthopsis) species, with an adult body mass of up to 30 g (1.1 oz) for females and 55 g (1.9 oz) for males. Adults are usually 10 to 16 cm (3.9 to 6.3 in) long. Only the Julia Creek dunnart is larger, weighing 40–70 g (1.4–2.5 oz).

It is identified by its compartively larger size and bicoloured fur patterning (typically grey dorsally and white ventrally). The tail is clearly contrasted (dark ventrally/lighter dorsally) and terminally crested. Its forehead usually has a noticeably dark stripe.

Its thermoneutral body temperature is around 34.4 °C (93.9 °F). While the sandhill dunnart's physiology resembles that of other dunnarts, penile morphology and molecular biology suggest that it is basal to its genus.

The sandhill dunnart usually moves by running smoothly on all four legs, sometimes with sudden short stops, during which they often squat with the forebody slightly elevated. The maximum speed recorded for S. psammophila is 3 km/h (1.9 mph).

== Ecology ==
=== Diet ===
The species prefers to eat invertebrate prey, such as ants, beetles, spiders, grasshoppers, termites, wasps and centipedes. In the Western Great Victoria Desert, the sandhill dunnart has an ant-rich diet, commonly consuming Camponotus spp. (sugar ants) and Iridomyrmex spp. (meat ants). However, dunnarts are thought to be a generalist feeders and extremely opportunistic. Other recorded prey species are gastropods, geckos, skinks and mice. Food intake remains high in all seasons, varying only slightly in proportion.

=== Physiology ===
In severe conditions when food is scarce, the sandhill dunnart enters short and shallow periods of torpor. The species' documented states of mental and physical inactivity helps it to conserve water and energy. From an analysis of the sandhill dunnart's metabolic, thermal, and ventilatory physiology, the organism's body temperature ranges, including thermoneutral, thermolability below thermoneutral, and mild hyperthermia temperatures are typical of those seen in small dunnarts and dasyurids.

=== Reproduction ===
Sandhill dunnarts typically begin breeding in September, with offspring born from September to October. Pouch young, dependent young and weaned juveniles are present in October. However, juveniles have been trapped between October and April. This information may suggest that with the right conditions in a good season, sandhill dunnarts may be able to produce another litter. There is a sixteen- to nineteen-day interval between mating and birth.

Sexual maturity for both the male and female dunnart is reached by one year of age. The age at which dunnarts are no longer able to reproduce is undetermined. In captivity, males can breed at five years and females at three years. In the wild, S. psammophila typically survives for one breeding season but this can extend to two seasons in favourable conditions.

=== Behaviour ===
Sandhill dunarts are typically solitary and nocturnal, emerging shortly after dusk and foraging almost continuously until dawn. During the day, they typically shelter from the climatic extremes of the desert within burrows. Populations have naturally low densities but can increase significantly following major rainfall events. Individuals exhibit both "resident" or highly mobile "transient" behaviour to locate resource patches when they become available.

== Distribution ==
The sandhill dunnart currently inhabits sandy, semi-arid regions dominated by spinifex (Triodia) grasslands in South Australia and Western Australia. However, the type specimen was caught "with a thrown boot" during the Horn Expedition in 1894 in the Northern Territory. Subsequently, it was recorded in owl pellets only in Uluru's caves. Shortly after, the sandhill dunnart was mistakenly presumed extinct.

In 1969, the sandhill dunnart was detected on Eyre Peninsula in South Australia. Eyre Peninsula is a well-studied stronghold. Records have been radiocarbon dated to approximately 2-3 thousand years ago. From the 1990s, the Yellabinna Regional Reserve in South Australia was confirmed as a second stronghold. From 2017, several S. psammophila records were confirmed between the Eyre Peninsula and Yellabinna populations.

The third stronghold is the Western Australian Great Victoria Desert. Individuals were detected near Mulga Rockhole in 1985 and later in/near Queen Victoria Spring Nature Reserve and near Tropicana Gold Mine. In 2018, another population was detected 150 km north of the known range. Ancient sandhill dunnart bones have been recorded by Dr Alex Baynes near Yalgoo and Lake Barlee (400-600 km west of the current population), indicating that the sandhill dunnart was once more widespread in Western Australia.

Each stronghold is genetically differentiated, based on the frequency of microsatellite alleles and CR haplotypes, and should be considered as distinct Management Units for conservation. Yellabinna and Western Australian populations share a mtDNA haplotype, indicating historical connectivity across the southern Great Victoria Desert. No significant genetic structure or sex-biased dispersal was detected locally, suggesting that both sexes are highly mobile. Individuals can therefore relocate to neighbouring resource patches when available.

Although previously more widespread, the sandhill dunnart has experienced a significant range contraction. The sandhill dunnart may continue to contract south in the future because of the effects of climate change. Due to the cessation of suitable spinifex habitats in the south, the Great Victoria Desert populations are at risk of extinction by 2070.

== Habitat ==
Sandhill dunnarts are nocturnal and typically dig burrows to shelter from the climatic extremes of the day. In Western Australia, burrows are often concealed under mature spinifex hummocks (32+ years since fire). Burrows have been recorded over two metres deep, but are typically 35 cm deep, with an entrance 4 cm high by 5 cm wide. In South Australia, burrows range from about 12 to 110 centimetres in length and are up to 46 centimetres deep. Females can dig deeper burrows with a chamber used for raising their young. Spinifex hummocks, other hummock species (e.g., Lepidobolus deserti and Schoenus hexandrus), logs, a piece of bark, the burrows of other species (e.g., Notomys alexis) and a burned mallee tree trunk have also been used as shelters.

Sminthopsis psammophila requires habitat with mature vegetation. In Western Australia, long unburned (32+ years since fire), dense lower stratum (usually spinifex) sand plain and dune slope habitats are preferred. Whereas less vegetated sand dune crests are used rarely. In South Australia, complex habitats with an abundance of logs and spinifex hummocks over 40 cm high are important for S. psammophila. There is a preference for 'Stage 3' spinifex hummocks (fire age: 8-20 years) in areas of Eyre Peninsula.

=== Home range and population density ===
The average home range area determined with radio and GPS tracking is 70 ha (range 6-274 ha). Home range area is influenced by sex and reproductive status and it is not known whether home ranges can overlap. Sandhill dunnarts are caught infrequently and simultaneous tracking of individuals in an area is rare. Sandhill dunnarts are not recaptured often making mark-recapture population assessments problematic. Hence, the population density of the sandhill dunnart is difficult to estimate.

== Threats ==
The decline of the sandhill dunnart is likely due to a combination of factors. Predation by introduced species such as the red fox and feral cat, habitat degradation by livestock grazing, land clearance (e.g., in Eyre Peninsula where only 43 % of the original vegetation remains) and changed fire regimes are likely contributors.

Wildfires are a major threat to the sandhill dunnart as it requires mature spinifex grassland habitats. A single large wildfire can eradicate an entire population. However, the sandhill dunnart has been radio tracked to shelters in a range of fire ages, including recently burned habitats. If they survive wildfires, sandhill dunnarts may recolonise small patches of habitat because of their large home ranges and high mobility. As suitable habitat remnants become increasingly isolated this reduces the likelihood of recolonisation. It is therefore important to maintain habitat connectivity across the landscape to enable sandhill dunnarts to maintain genetic diversity.

Climate change is a significant threat to the sandhill dunnart and many other species in Australia. Rapidly increasing temperatures, irregular rainfall patterns and more frequent/extreme events (e.g., wildfires and droughts) are particularly dangerous in Australia. Water is already scarce, vegetation is highly flammable, and the generally flat landscape impedes elevation shifts that allow species to compensate against rising temperatures.

Modelling predicts that under RCP 8.5 which is our current greenhouse gas (GHG) emissions pathway, suitable habitat for S. psammophila may reduce by 95% in Western Australia by 2050. By 2070, only the Eyre Peninsula population may remain viable and the continental distribution of S. psammophila may contract by up to 80%. However, this contraction could be halved if emissions peak in 2040 then reduce (RCP 4.5).

== Conservation ==
Sminthopsis psammophila is listed as 'Endangered' under the Australian Federal EPBC Act (1999). Western Australian populations are listed as 'Endangered' by the Biodiversity Conservation Act (2016) and South Australian populations are listed as 'Vulnerable' by the National Parks and Wildlife Act (1972). The IUCN conservation status has fluctuated from 'Data Deficient' to 'Endangered' and is now classified as 'Vulnerable'. However, the IUCN conservation status of S. psammophila may require review. Climate change in Australia and synergistic extinction pressures are immediate concerns.

The sandhill dunnart has some protection against clearing within reserves, such as the Ironstone Hill Conservation Park and the Yellabinna Wilderness Protection Area in South Australia, and the Queen Victoria Spring Nature Reserve in Western Australia. In 2001, a national recovery plan was published. The recovery plan is currently under review by DCCEEW.

Suggested actions to conserve sandhill dunnart populations include preventing further habitat loss, conducting surveys in areas predicted as present for S. psammophila and implementing monitoring programs for key populations. Artificial habitats may be beneficial for dunnart conservation. Translocations to reserves in climatic refuges or to artificial desert ecosystems may be required. Species distribution modelling is useful to find new populations of threatened species such as the sandhill dunnart. Further research on captive individuals to increase reproductive biology knowledge has been suggested.

In Tjuntjuntjara, the Pila Nguru Rangers have established conservation programs in sandhill dunnart habitats. Prior to colonisation, sandhill dunnart habitats were managed by the First Australians. Cultural/traditional burning practices promoted landscapes which supported fauna and flora. Globally, two-way science and right-way fire programs have produced results for many threatened species. Hence, Indigenous Protected Areas are key for the conservation of Australian species. Citizen science projects with community groups such as the Friends of the Great Victoria Desert should be also promoted.

Most significantly, mitigating the effects of climate change by reducing GHG emissions is vital for the conservation of S. psammophila and many other Australian species.
