= Mount Finke =

Mountain in Australia

- Location within South Australia

Highest point
- Elevation: 369 m (1,211 ft)
- Coordinates: 30°55′30″S 134°00′43″E

Geography
- Location: Yellabinna, South Australia, Australia

Mount Finke is a monadnock in the Australian state of South Australia, located in the gazetted locality of Yellabinna about 125 kilometres (78 mi) north of Ceduna.

In 1999, it was described as follows:

It is about 5km long with an elevation of 369 m AHD, it stands about 270m above the surrounding landscape. Mt Finke is an isolated block of steeply dipping quartzite believed to be part of a landform dating back some 250 Ma.

It was named by John McDouall Stuart, the British explorer, on 7 August 1858 after William Finke who was a friend "associated with mining & pastoral activities".

It has a locally diverse flora and fauna, including 266 plant species. The open shrubland occurs on thin soils over quartzite with the most common species including Victoria spring mallee (Eucalyptus trivialis), mulga (Acacia aneura), Ooldea mallee (Eucalyptus youngiana) and porcupine grass (Triodia irritans). Grevillea treueriana is endemic to the Mount Finke area. Fauna species include the euro (Macropus robustus), little rock dragon (Ctenophorus fionii), little wood swallow (Artamus minor) and leaf beetle (Paropsisterna bimaculata).

Since 2005, Mount Finke has been located within the boundaries of the protected area known as the Yellabinna Wilderness Protection Area which was originally part of the Yellabinna Regional Reserve.
