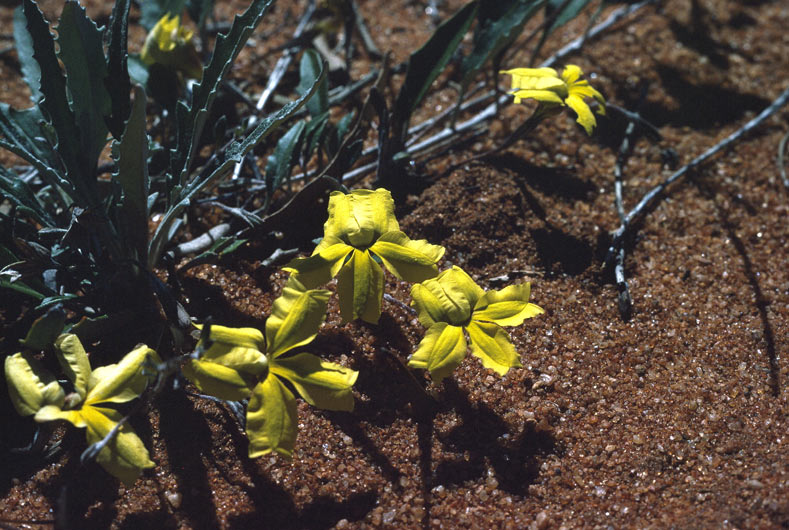
- Near Zanthus

Scientific classification
- Kingdom: Plantae
- Clade: Tracheophytes
- Clade: Angiosperms
- Clade: Eudicots
- Clade: Asterids
- Order: Asterales
- Family: Goodeniaceae
- Genus: Goodenia
- Species: G. xanthosperma

Binomial name
- Goodenia xanthosperma F.Muell.

Synonyms
- Goodenia discolor K.Krause; Goodenia mooreana K.Krause; Goodenia scaevolina var. primulacea auct. non (Schltdl.) Benth.: Diels, F.L.E. & Pritzel, E.G.; Goodenia stapfiana K.Krause

= Goodenia xanthosperma =

Yellow-seeded goodenia

Species of flowering plant

Goodenia xanthosperma, commonly known as yellow-seeded goodenia, is a species of flowering plant in the family Goodeniaceae and is endemic to southern inland Western Australia. It is a prostrate herb with elliptic to egg-shaped leaves at the base of the plant and racemes of yellow flowers with purplish markings.

== Description ==
Goodenia xanthosperma is a prostrate herb that typically grows to a height of 1–15 cm (0.39–5.91 in) with stems up to 80 cm (31 in) long. The leaves at the base of the plant are elliptic to egg-shaped, 30–60 mm (1.2–2.4 in) long and 13–30 mm (0.51–1.18 in) wide, with toothed or lobed edges. The flowers are arranged in racemes up to 800 mm (31 in) long on a peduncle up to 50 mm (2.0 in) long with leaf-like bracts and linear bracteoles up to 10–30 mm (0.39–1.18 in) long, each flower on a pedicel 2–25 mm (0.079–0.984 in) long. The corolla is yellow with purplish markings, about 15 mm (0.59 in) long, the lower lobes 5–7 mm (0.20–0.28 in) long with wings about 2 mm (0.079 in) wide. Flowering mainly occurs from May to October.

== Taxonomy and naming ==
Goodenia xanthosperma was first formally described in 1876 by Ferdinand von Mueller in Fragmenta phytographiae Australiae from specimens collected by Jess Young. The specific epithet (xanthosperma) means "yellow-seeded".

== Distribution ==
This goodenia grows in sandy soil on sandplains in the drier areas of southern inland Western Australia.

== Conservation status ==
Goodenia xanthosperma is classified as "not threatened" by the Government of Western Australia Department of Parks and Wildlife.
