= Tallaringa Conservation Park =

Protected area in South Australia

- IUCN category VI (protected area with sustainable use of natural resources)
- Location within South Australia
- Location: South Australia
- Nearest city: Coober Pedy
- Coordinates: 28°47′26″S 133°25′17″E
- Area: 12,688.59 km^{2} (4,899.09 sq mi)
- Established: 19 December 1991
- Governing body: Department for Environment and Water
- Website: Official website

Tallaringa Conservation Park is a protected area located in the west of the Australian state of South Australia about 615 kilometres (382 miles) north west of the city of Port Augusta and about 90 kilometres (56 miles) west of the town of Coober Pedy. The conservation park was proclaimed under the National Parks and Wildlife Act 1972 in 1991.

As of 2013, the conservation park was described as follows:

A vast wilderness of vegetated dunes and gibber rises, Tallaringa Conservation Park sits on the fringe of the Great Victoria Desert. The park supports a variety of wildlife species that have adapted to live in this dry arid environment.

The access to the conservation park is via the Anne Beadell Highway, which passes from east to west through it from the Stuart Highway in the east to Laverton in Western Australia in the west. The conservation park is located within the South Australian Government region of Eyre and Western, the Great Victoria Desert Bioregion and the RAAF Woomera Range Complex. The conservation park is classified as an IUCN Category VI protected area.

== See also ==
- Protected areas of South Australia
