= Pureba Conservation Park =

Protected area in South Australia

- IUCN category VI (protected area with sustainable use of natural resources)
- Location within South Australia
- Location: South Australia
- Nearest city: Ceduna
- Coordinates: 32.0494°S 134.4338°E
- Area: 2,264.03 km^{2} (874.15 sq mi)
- Established: 25 January 1990
- Governing body: Department for Environment and Water; Far West Coast Aboriginal Corporation

Pureba Conservation Park is a protected area in the Australian state of South Australia located in the west of the state in the gazetted locality of Pureba about 74 kilometres (46 mi) east of the town centre in Ceduna.

== Location ==
It is located partly within the extent of Eyre Peninsula and on land to the peninsula's immediate north.

== History ==
The land first acquired protected area status on 25 January 1990 as the Pureba Conservation Park constituted under the National Parks and Wildlife Act 1972. Crown land which had been previously dedicated as a conservation reserve known as the Pureba Conservation Reserve under the Crown Lands Act 1929 in 1993 was added to the conservation park on 29 June 2006 along with other land.

Its name is derived from Pureba Hill which is located within its boundaries.

As of 2013, the conservation park is managed as part of a larger group of protected areas known as the Yellabinna Reserves which also includes Boondina Conservation Park, the Yellabinna Regional Reserve, the Yellabinna Wilderness Protection Area and the Yumbarra Conservation Park. The management approach is described by the managing authority as being “an integrated and collaborative approach to the conservation of over three million hectares of mallee woodland”. No visitors facilities are provided within the conservation park nor is there access for public vehicles. Mineral exploration and mining is permitted in the conservation park.

A co-management agreement signed by the Far West Coast Aboriginal Corporation and the Government of South Australia in 2013 with respect to the Yumbarra Conservation Park also provides for the corporation to give advice on the management of the conservation park and other reserves in the west of the state. The conservation park is one of those in the west of the state where Aboriginal people are permitted to hunt for and gather food.

The conservation park is classified as an IUCN Category VI protected area.

== See also ==
- Protected areas of South Australia
