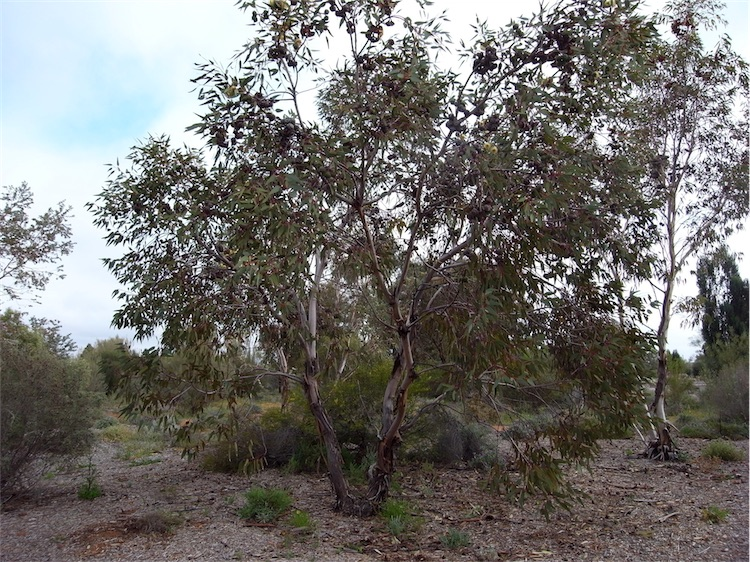
- Eucalyptus youngiana in the Australian Arid Lands Botanic Garden

Scientific classification
- Kingdom: Plantae
- Clade: Embryophytes
- Clade: Tracheophytes
- Clade: Spermatophytes
- Clade: Angiosperms
- Clade: Eudicots
- Clade: Rosids
- Order: Myrtales
- Family: Myrtaceae
- Genus: Eucalyptus
- Species: E. youngiana

Binomial name
- Eucalyptus youngiana F.Muell.

= Eucalyptus youngiana =

Large-fruited mallee

Species of eucalyptus

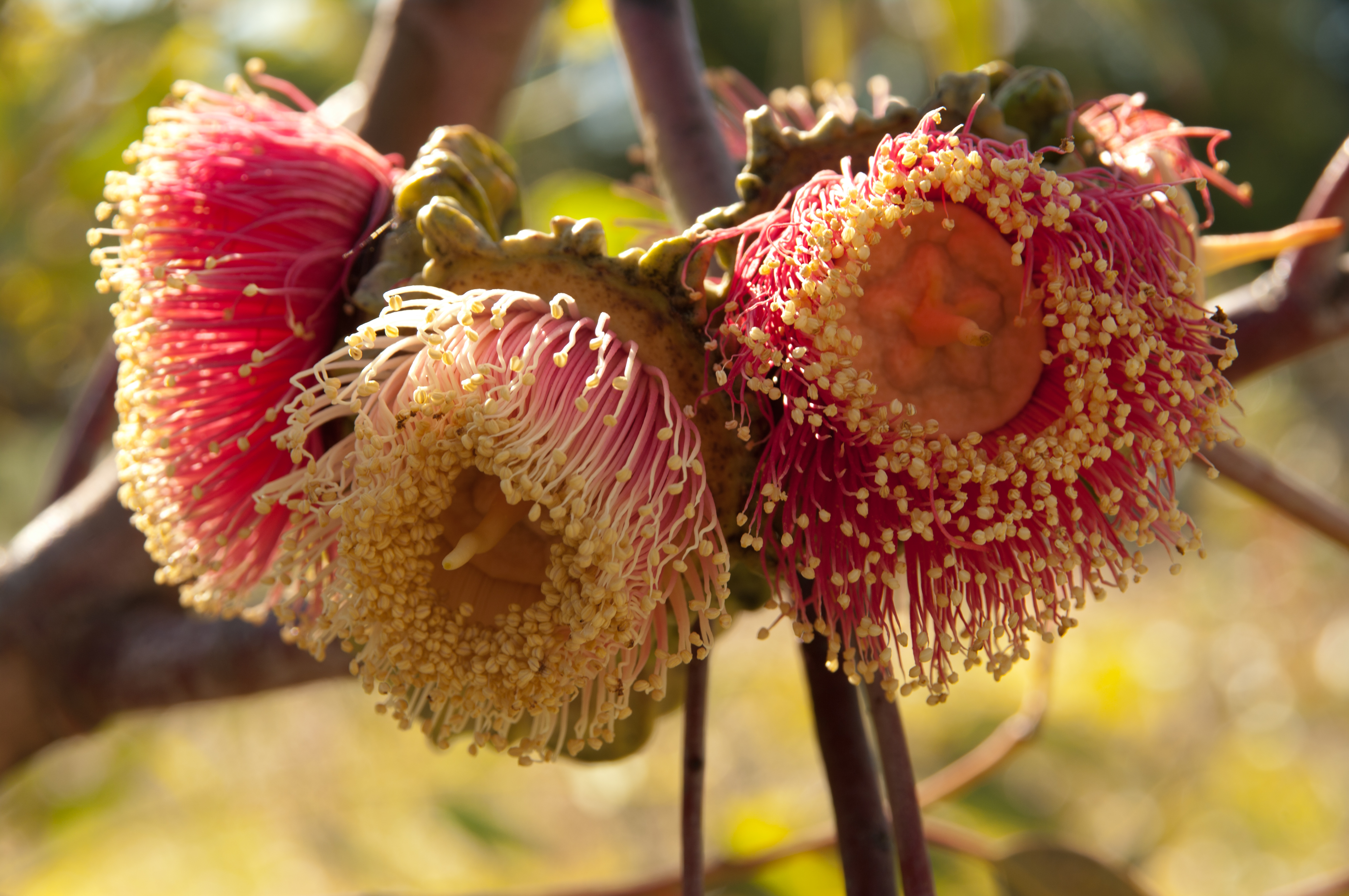
Flowers in Kings Park

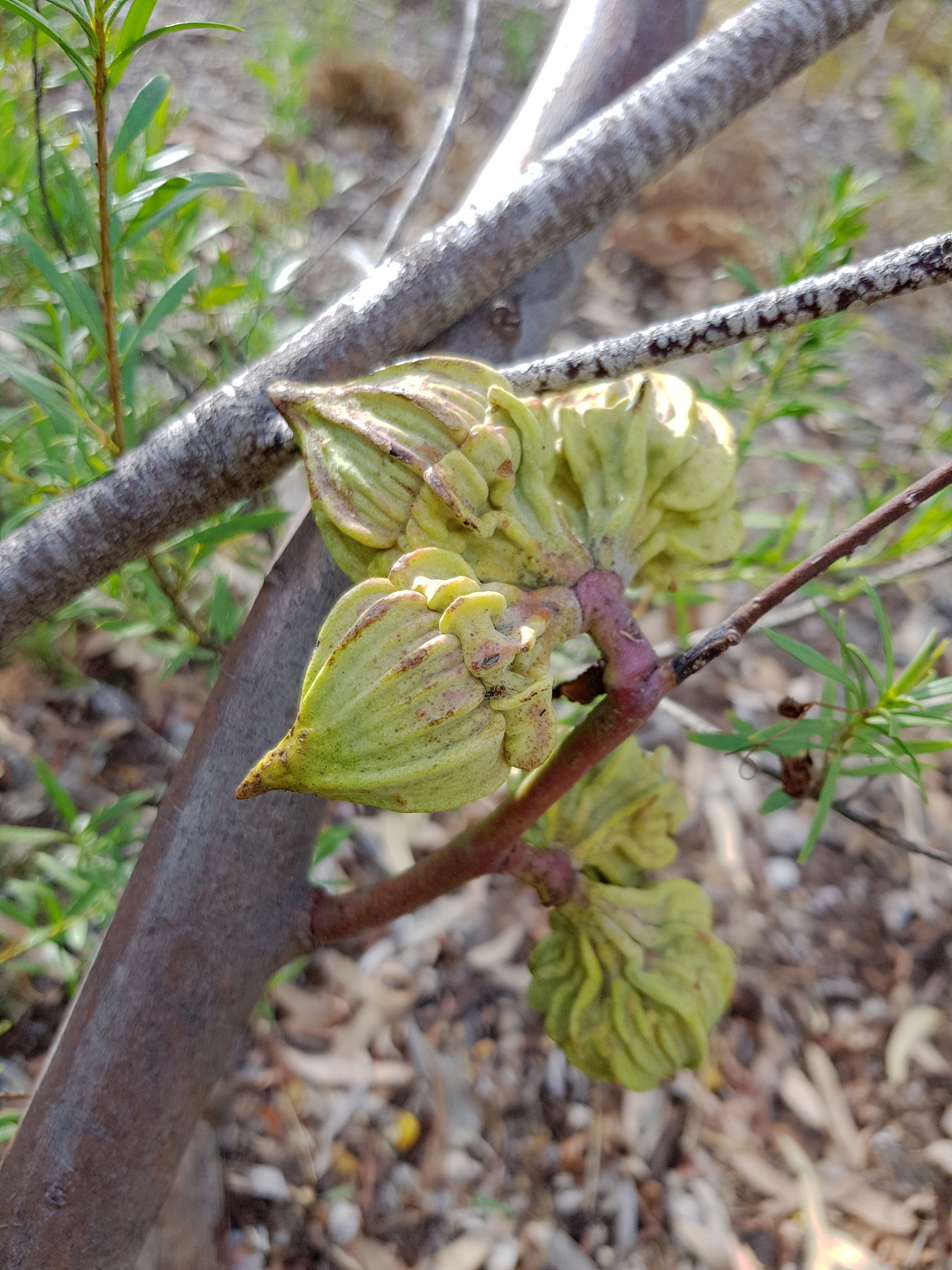
Flower buds

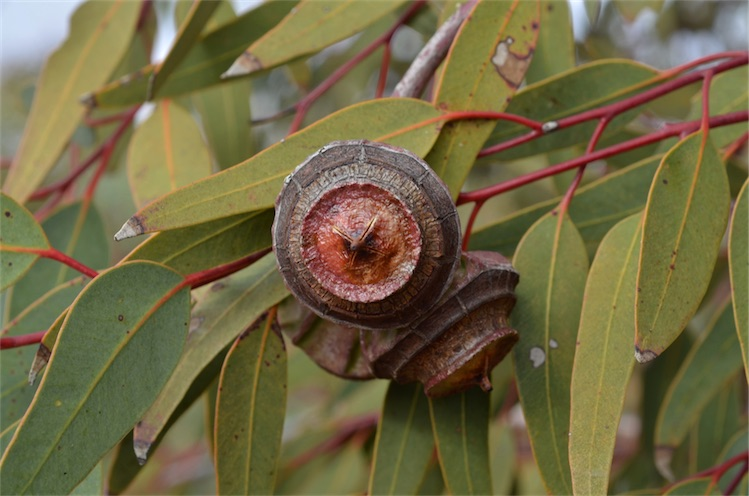
Fruit

Eucalyptus youngiana, commonly known as large-fruited mallee, Ooldea mallee and yarldarlba, is a species of mallee, less commonly a tree, that is native to arid and semi-arid areas of southern Western Australia and South Australia. It has rough, fibrous bark on some or all of the trunk, smooth bark above, lance-shaped adult leaves, flower buds in groups of three, red, pink or bright yellow flowers and short, broad, conical fruit.

== Description ==
Eucalyptus youngiana is a mallee that typically grows to a height of 4 to 8 metres (13 to 26 ft), less commonly a tree to 10 m (33 ft), and forms a lignotuber. It has rough, flaky, dark grey-brown bark on part or all of the trunk and smooth, pinkish-grey to creamy bark above. Young plants and coppice regrowth have greyish green, egg-shaped to lance-shaped leaves that are 70–160 mm (2.8–6.3 in) long and 25–45 mm (0.98–1.77 in) wide. The adult leaves are the same shade of dull bluish green on both sides, lance-shaped, 85–170 mm (3.3–6.7 in) long and 15–37 mm (0.59–1.46 in) wide, tapering to a petiole 15–32 mm (0.59–1.26 in) long. The flower buds are arranged in leaf axils in groups of three on an unbranched peduncle 10–25 mm (0.39–0.98 in) long, the individual buds on pedicels 5–15 mm (0.20–0.59 in) long. Mature buds are oval, 45–60 mm (1.8–2.4 in) long and 30–45 mm (1.2–1.8 in) wide with a horn-shaped or beaked operculum 28–42 mm (1.1–1.7 in) long. Flowering occurs from June to October and the flowers are red, pink or bright yellow. The fruit is a woody, short, broad and hemispherical capsule, 15–30 mm (0.59–1.18 in) long and 33–60 mm (1.3–2.4 in) wide with coarse, longitudinal ridges. The seeds are brown, an irregular pyramid shape and 2.5–4 mm (0.098–0.157 in) long.

== Taxonomy ==
Eucalyptus youngiana was first formally described in 1876 by Ferdinand von Mueller in his book Fragmenta phytographiae Australiae, based on specimens collected at Queen Victoria Spring by Jess Young during the Giles expedition of May 1875. The specific epithet honours Jess Young, a member of Giles's fourth expedition, who collected the type specimen.

== Distribution and habitat ==
The large-fruited mallee grows in sandy soil on flat country, often associated with Triodia species. It occurs throughout arid and semi-arid areas from north of Kalgoorlie in Western Australia through the Great Victoria Desert to Tarcoola and Bulgunnia Station in South Australia.
