= Yumbarra Conservation Park =

Conservation park in South Australia

- IUCN category VI (protected area with sustainable use of natural resources)
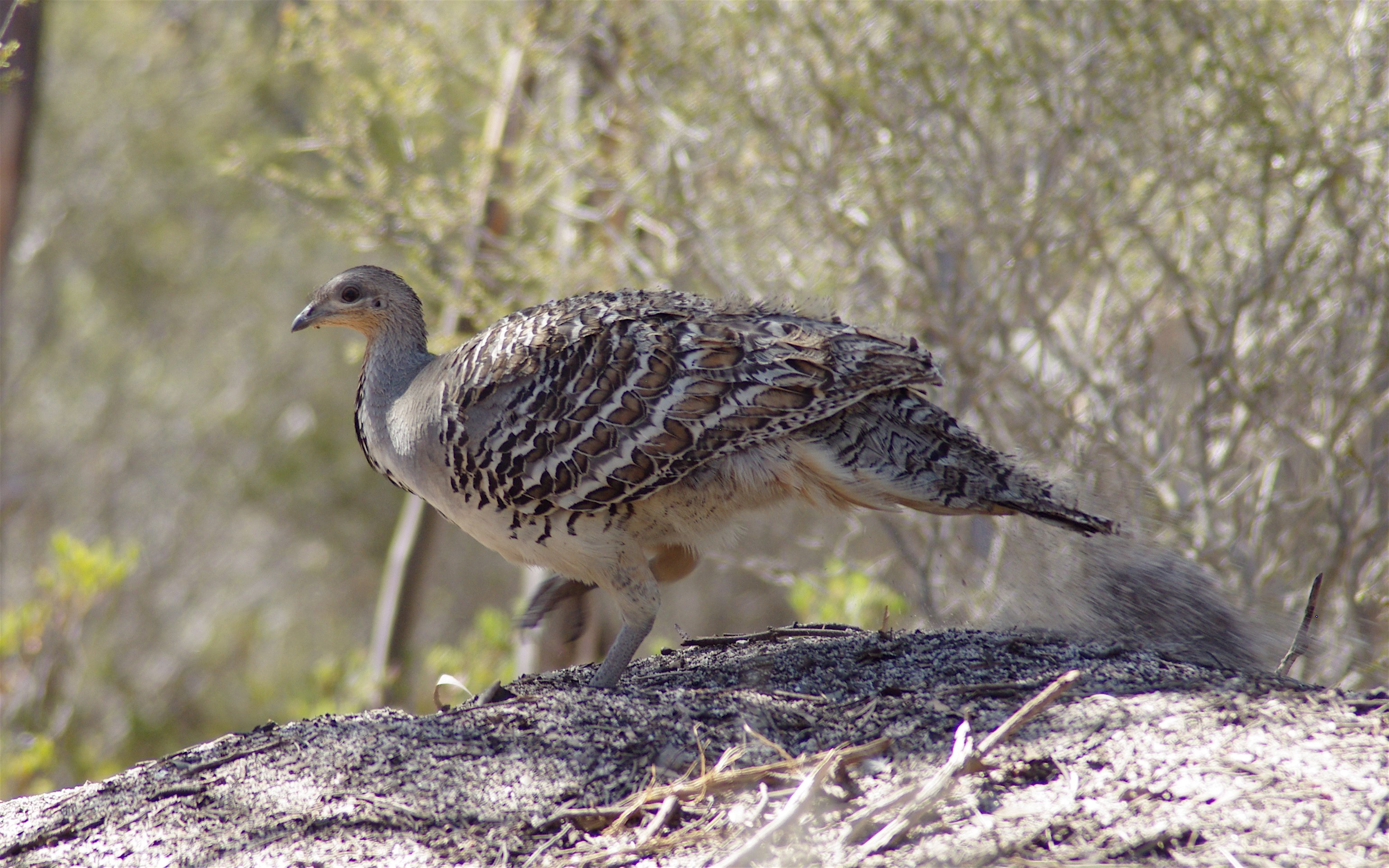
- Malleefowl

- Location within South Australia
- Location: South Australia
- Nearest city: Ceduna
- Coordinates: 31°41′S 133°37′E
- Area: 3,243.52 km^{2} (1,252.33 sq mi)
- Established: 30 May 1968
- Governing body: Department for Environment and Water; Far West Coast Aboriginal Corporation
- Website: Official website

Yumbarra Conservation Park, formerly the Yumbarra National Park, is a protected area in the Australian state of South Australia located about 55 kilometres (34 miles) north of the town centre of Ceduna.

To the north it borders Yellabinna Regional Reserve; to the east, Pureba Conservation Park. The conservation park is outside the dog fence, which borders it in the south. Thus, it is situated in the area where dingoes are tolerated. Other animals in the conservation park include southern hairy-nosed wombats, malleefowls, sandhill dunnarts and kangaroos.

The name "Yumbarra" comes from a prominent rock hole in the area that fills with water after rain, turning into a temporary water hole for the conservation park's wildlife. This particular feature of the rock makes it an important site for birds, and thus bird watching.

The arid landscape is characterised by rolling sand dunes. Googs Track, a 120 km (75 mi) four-wheel drive road connecting the Eyre Highway north of Ceduna to the Trans-Australian Railway near Tarcoola, passes through the conservation park and the Yellabinna Regional Reserve to the north. A few walking trails connect Googs Track with a campsite at Googs Lake, and Mount Finke.

The conservation park is an important habitat for some of Australia's most endangered wildlife species, such as the malleefowl and sandhill dunnart. The conservation park is also home to kangaroos, wombats and dingoes.

A co-management agreement signed by the Far West Coast Aboriginal Corporation and the Government of South Australia in 2013 in respect to the Yumbarra Conservation Park provides for the corporation to give advice on the management of the conservation park and other reserves in the west of the state.

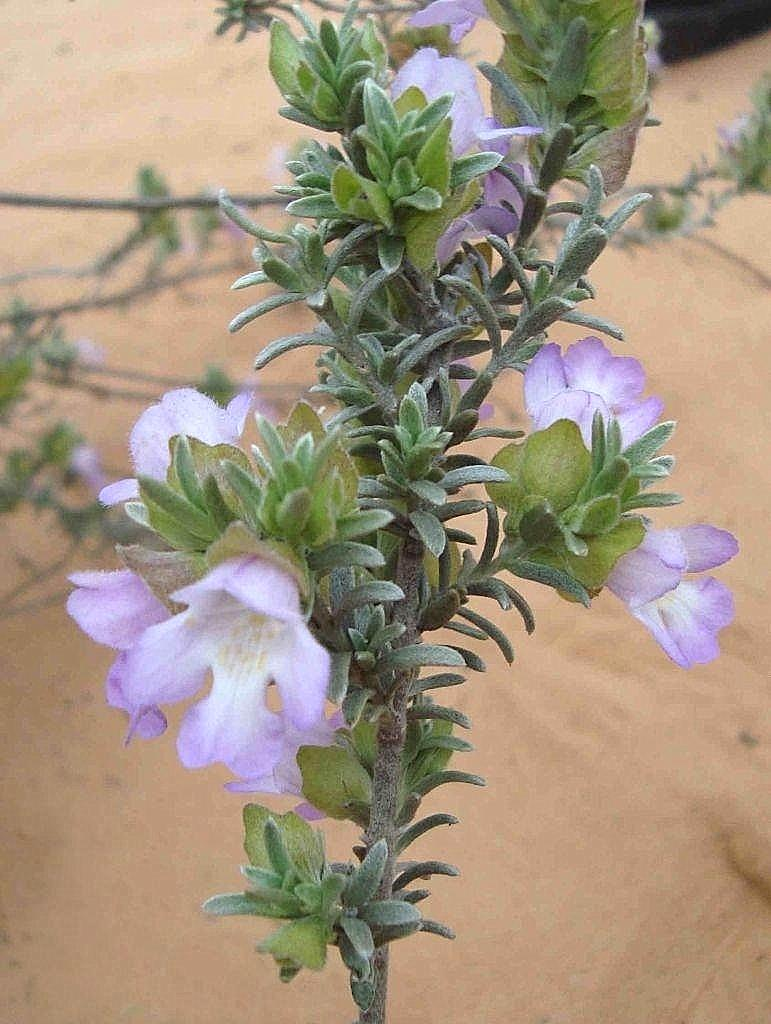
Prostanthera ammophila (mintbush) within Yumbarra Conservation Park

The conservation park is classified as an IUCN Category VI protected area.

== See also ==
- Protected areas of South Australia
