= Yellabinna, South Australia =

Yellabinna
- Suburb
- Coordinates: 31°07′26″S 133°19′25″E
- Country: Australia
- State: South Australia
- Region: Eyre Western
- LGA: Pastoral Unincorporated Area
- Location: 500 km (310 mi) north west of Adelaide city centre; 60 km (37 mi) north of Ceduna
- Established: 2013

Government
  - State electorate: Flinders Giles
  - Federal division: Grey

Population
  - Total: 0 (SAL 2016)
- Time zone: UTC+9:30 (ACST)
  - Summer (DST): UTC+10:30 (ACST)
- County: Hopetoun (part); Kintore (part)
- Mean max temp: 23.5 °C (74.3 °F)
- Mean min temp: 10.5 °C (50.9 °F)
- Annual rainfall: 295.0 mm (11.61 in)
Suburbs around Yellabinna
See Surrounding localities

Yellabinna is a locality in the Australian state of South Australia located to the north of the town of Ceduna in the western part of the state.

The locality was established on 26 April 2013 in respect to “the long established local name.” Its name is derived from the use of “Yellabinna” in the names of the Yellabinna Regional Reserve and the Yellabinna Wilderness Protection Area.

Yellabinna is located within the federal Division of Grey, the state electoral districts of Flinders and Giles, and the Pastoral Unincorporated Area of South Australia.

The land use within Yellabinna is mainly concerned with the following protected areas - the Boondina Conservation Park, the Yellabinna Regional Reserve and the Yellabinna Wilderness Protection Area, although the extraction of heavy mineral sands is underway as of 2013 by Iluka Resources at the Jacinth-Ambrosia Mine in the west of the locality.

== Surrounding localities ==
Yellabinna which is bounded in part to the north by the Trans-Australian Railway is surrounded by the following localities gazetted under the South Australian Geographical Names Act 1991:

- North: Commonwealth Hill, Mulgathing
- Northeast: Wilgena
- East: Wilgena, Lake Everard
- Southeast: Kondoolka
- South: Yalata, Chundaria, Mitchidy Moola, Bookabie, Nanbona, Penong, Yumbara and Pureba
- Southwest: Yalata
- West: Nullarbor
- Northwest: Maralinga Tjarutja

== See also ==
- List of cities and towns in South Australia
- Mount Finke
- Jacinth Ambrosia Airport
