= Iluka Resources =

Australian mining company

Iluka Resources Limited
- Type: Public company
- Traded as: ASX: ILU
- Industry: Mining
- Founded: 1998
- Headquarters: 240 St Georges Terrace, Perth, Western Australia
- Key people: James Mactier (Chairman); Tom O'Leary (CEO)
- Products: Ilmenite, Zircon, Rutile, Synthetic Rutile
- Revenue: $1.1 billion (2024)
- Operating income: $477 million (2024)
- Number of employees: 1,075 (2023)
- Website: www.iluka.com

Iluka Resources is an Australian resources company, specialising in mineral sands exploration, project development, operations and marketing. It was formed in July 1998 in a merger between Westralian Sands and the titanium mineral business RGC Ltd, becoming Iluka Resources Ltd in 1999. Iluka is a major producer of zircon and titanium dioxide–derived rutile and synthetic rutile globally. The company has operations in Australia, and has also conducted business in the United States and the West African country of Sierra Leone in the past.

== History ==
Iluka Resources was formed in July 1998 in a merger between Westralian Sands and the titanium mineral business RGC Ltd (Renison Goldfields Consolidated Limited), with the new name effective in 1999. Westralian Sands was established in 1954 but commenced operations in 1959 when it started mining and processing the Yoganup deposit near Capel in Western Australia. It was first registered as Westralian Sands Limited on the ASX in 1968.

In 1999, the company sold off or closed many parts of its business, including Westlime Limited, Koba Tin, RGC Thalanga Copper, RGC South Capel operation, and its share of the Narama Coal mine in New South Wales.

In September 2008 the company signed a contract with rail freight operator El Zorro to carry containerised mineral sands from Portland in the south-west of Victoria to Melbourne, with Iluka saying rail transport was cheaper than road.

In 2006, it closed its operations in Florida and Georgia retaining a presence in the United States in Michigan.

In March 2009, Iluka announced that it would bring forward the closure of one of the synthetic rutile kilns at the Narngulu operations and that 23 jobs would be lost. The move came in response to falling demand as a result of the 2008 financial crisis.

In 2014 Iluka established an initial 18.3 per cent interest in the UK technology company, Metalysis, which was seeking to commercialise technology to convert metals into powder, including titanium powder. Iluka increased its interest to approximately 28 percent in 2016. Iluka also commenced work in 2014 with Vale in relation to the potential commercialisation of a large titanium ore body, with rare-earth elements, in Minas Gerais, Brazil.

In August 2016, Iluka announced its intention to acquire Sierra Leone–based and London Stock Exchange–listed miner Sierra Rutile Limited. The sale was finalised in December 2016 for $393 million. As part of the acquisition, Iluka intended to invest AU$290 million to expand production, improve operation and safety facilities and streamline operations. The Sierra Rutile mine has an extensive, long-life rutile deposit which complemented existing assets in titanium oxide. In April 2022, the Sierra Leone business was spun off.

== Operations ==
As of 2016 Iluka was the largest producer of zircon and titanium dioxide–derived rutile and synthetic rutile globally. The company mines heavy mineral sands and separates the concentrate into its individual mineral constituents rutile, ilmenite, and zircon. Some of the ilmenite is then processed into synthetic rutile.

It has had operations in the Australian states of Western Australia (Eucla and Perth Basins); South Australia (Jacinth-Ambrosia Mine); Victoria; and New South Wales (Murray Basin). As of 2014, Iluka was conducting international exploration, including for selected non-mineral sands opportunities, mainly on its Australian tenements.

Iluka has been extracting [zircon (used in ceramics) and titanium dioxide (used in paint pigment, plastics, and paper), by processing mineral sands at Eneabba, Western Australia since the early 1990s.

== Rare-earths at Eneabba ==
Iluka's operations at Eneabba since the early 1990s have been producing monazite and xenotime, which are rare-earth-bearing minerals, as by-products of processing the mineral sands. These by-products, which have an estimated value of US$650m (£440m) in 2025, have been stockpiled them in a disused mining hole near its Narngulu Mineral Separation Plant at Eneabba. Iluka commissioned a processing plant (concentrator), completed in 2022, that separates the monazite (and additional zircon), producing a 90% monazite concentrate that will be input to a new fully-integrated rare earths refinery at Eneabba. The development is supported by an Australian Government loan of AU$1.25 billion under its Critical Minerals Strategy. From 2027, neodymium, praseodymium, dysprosium, terbium, and other rare-earth elements will be produced at the facility. With the demand for rare earths growing by 50–170% between 2025 and 2030, and most of the rare-earths being produced by China in recent years, the plant is aiming to supply a significant proportion of Western demand for rare-earths. Iluka has to work within the Australian legislative framework to avert polluting the environment, as processing rare-earths involves extraction, leaching, thermal cracking, and refining, which produce radioactive components.
