= Queen Victoria Spring Nature Reserve =

Protected area in Western Australia

- IUCN category Ia (strict nature reserve)
- Location within Western Australia
- Location: Western Australia
- Nearest city: Kalgoorlie
- Coordinates: 30°23′42″S 123°31′12″E
- Area: 2,723.31 km^{2} (1,051.48 sq mi)
- Established: 1970
- Governing body: Department of Parks and Wildlife

Queen Victoria Spring Nature Reserve is a protected area managed by the Department of Parks and Wildlife and is located approximately 200 km (124 mi) east of Kalgoorlie in the Great Victoria Desert in the Goldfields-Esperance region of Western Australia.

The explorer Ernest Giles named the spring in September 1875 as a part of the first successful east–west crossing from South Australia to the coast of Western Australia. At the time the spring was full of water, which was a great relief to him after spending 17 days without water. In 1891, the Elder Scientific Exploring Expedition, arrived at the spring hoping to fing water but instead found it dry. The spring itself is at -30.427, 123.5744.

The park was gazetted on 21 August 1970 as a Class A nature reserve and encompasses an area of approximately 212,600 ha (525,000 acres).

The western portion of the reserve lies in the Western Australian mulga shrublands ecoregion (Murchison bioregion), and the eastern portion is in the Great Victoria Desert.

The north eastern part of the reserve is composed of sand plains and sand dunes with occasional salt pans with red-brown soils. The south west is composed of more complex soils with gently undulating plains with some outcrops of rocks, the soils are alkaline red earth underlain by limestone or with limestone nodules found just under the soil layer.

Two rare vertebrates; Southern Marsupial Mole (Notoryctes typhlops) and Mulgara (Dasycercus cristicauda) have both been collected from around the spring. Rare flora including species of Eremophila are also found within the park.
