= Yellabinna Regional Reserve =

Protected area in South Australia

- IUCN category VI (protected area with sustainable use of natural resources)
- Location within South Australia
- Location: South Australia
- Nearest city: Ceduna
- Coordinates: 31°08′17″S 133°24′37″E
- Area: 20,008.97 km^{2} (7,725.51 sq mi)
- Established: 25 January 1990
- Governing body: Department for Environment and Water
- Website: Official website

The Yellabinna Regional Reserve is a protected area in the Australian state of South Australia located about 30 kilometres (19 miles) north of Ceduna. To the west it borders Nullarbor Regional Reserve, to the south Yumbarra Conservation Park and Pureba Conservation Park. In the northwestern Section the 5,030 km^{2} Yellabinna Wilderness Protection Area is almost entirely surrounded by the Regional Reserve. The northern border in the western half of the reserve is formed by the Trans-Australian Railway.

The arid landscape is characterised by red sand dunes. The wildlife is adapted to the dry climate. Typical species are scarlet-chested parrots, Major Mitchell's cockatoos, thorny devils, sandhill dunnarts and malleefowls. The reserve is on the outside of the dingo fence, which borders it in the east. Therefore, it is situated in the area where dingoes are tolerated.

The regional reserve is classified as an IUCN Category VI protected area.

== See also ==
- Protected areas of South Australia
- Regional reserves of South Australia
- Regional Reserve (Australia)
- Yellabinna, South Australia
