= Jess Young =

British botanical collector 1851–1909

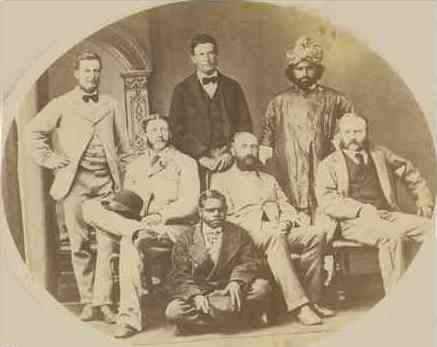
- The party for Giles' fourth expedition, with Young seated on the left
- Born: c. 1851
- Died: 8 October 1909 (aged 57–58); Perth, Western Australia
- Education: Cambridge University
- Father: Richard Young

Jess Young (Jesse) (c. 1851 – 1909) was an English traveller. He is best known as an explorer who accompanied Ernest Giles during his fourth expedition, making some important botanical collections along the way.

== Life ==
He was a younger son of Richard Young of Wisbech, England. He attended the Abbey Park School of David James Smeaton in St Andrews, Fifeshire, Scotland, as Jesse Young. He accompanied Richard Bourke, 6th Earl of Mayo on his 1872 inspection of Port Blair in the Andaman Islands, where Lord Mayo was assassinated.

In May 1875 Giles, in listing the members of his expedition party, referred to him as "Mr Jess Young, a young friend of Sir Thomas Elder, lately arrived from England." Giles's party left Beltana, South Australia on 6 May, and arrived in Perth, Western Australia on 13 November. During the expedition, Young collected the specimens of a number of new plant species, including Eucalyptus salubris, Eucalyptus youngiana and Eremophila youngii, all from the vicinity of the oasis in South Australia named Queen Victoria Spring by Giles. The latter two species were later named in Young's honour. The National Herbarium of Victoria has specimens of Acacia collected by him between 1875 and 1880.

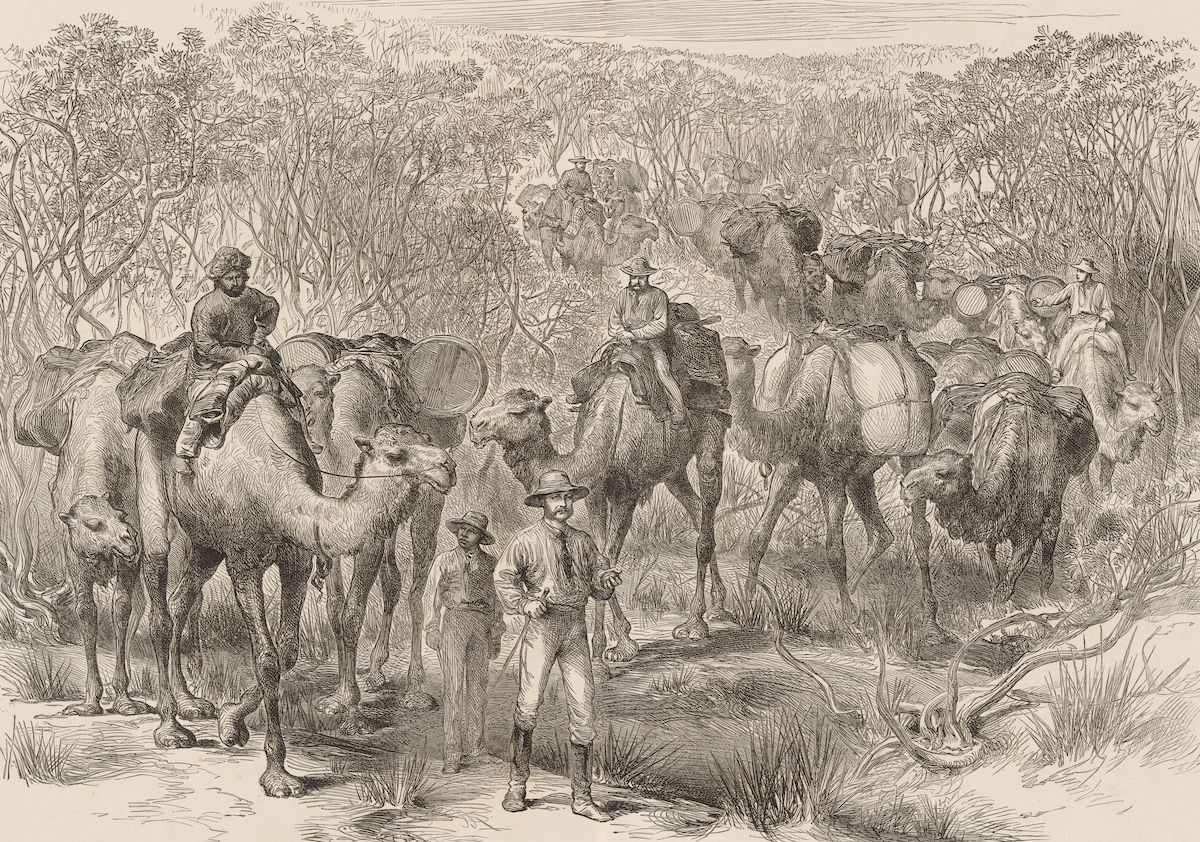
Wood engraving of the fourth Giles expedition and their camels, after a drawing by Jess Young

In April 1876 a newspaper announcement stated that Young, the "Australian Explorer", would shortly leave England for New Guinea. At a meeting of the Royal Geographical Society in May of that year, Young mentioned his particular interest in exploring further the coast beyond the Baxter River there, then so-called, where the SS Ellengowan had made a recent voyage. In 1877 Young was entered as a student at Christ's College, Cambridge, but did not matriculate.

Young sailed for New York, around the beginning of November 1878, with backing from Sir Thomas Elder for another expedition in Australia. While he was there, his health broke down. He spent Easter term 1879 at Christ's College, Cambridge, but did not take a degree. In December 1879 he was in New York, at a meeting of the American Geographical Society on the proposed Panama Canal, and gave a paper on the advantages of the Suez Canal. He subsequently took positions in business and banking in the US, returning to the United Kingdom in 1891 where he worked for the Board of Agriculture. He was on an Arctic surveying expedition in Siberia, and then had positions as an official at Kanowna, Western Australia.

Jess Young died on 8 October 1909 at Perth, Western Australia.

== Works ==
In 1878, Young published an account of his expedition in Journal of the American Geographical Society of New York, describing himself as "Astronomer of the Giles Expedition".
