= Yellabinna Wilderness Protection Area =

Protected area in South Australia

- IUCN category Ib (wilderness area)
- Location within South Australia
- Location: South Australia
- Nearest city: Ceduna
- Coordinates: 31°07′31.8″S 133°48′07.1″E
- Area: 5,007.04 km^{2} (1,933.23 sq mi)
- Established: 11 August 2005
- Governing body: Department for Environment and Water

Yellabinna Wilderness Protection Area is a protected area in the Australian state of South Australia located in the gazetted locality of Yellabinna about 100 kilometres (62 miles) north of the town of Ceduna.

The wilderness protection area was proclaimed under the Wilderness Protection Act 1992 on 11 August 2005 on land previously originally part of the Yellabinna Regional Reserve.

In 2016, its wilderness qualities were reported as follows:

Yellabinna Wilderness Protection Area forms a link between vegetation communities in southeastern Western Australia and Eyre Peninsula in South Australia. Yellabinna Wilderness Protection Area contains a variety of woodland and scrubland communities dominated by Eucalyptus species or Acacia species over dunes and swales and small patches of diverse communities over rocky outcrops. A variety of threatened species have been recorded within the reserve, with additional species considered likely to occur in the area. The enhanced protection of the reserve may encourage recreational activities such as camping, bush walking and wildlife observation.

It is classified as an IUCN Category Ib protected area.

== See also ==
- Protected areas of South Australia
- Mount Finke
