= Hundred of Murray =

Murray South Australia
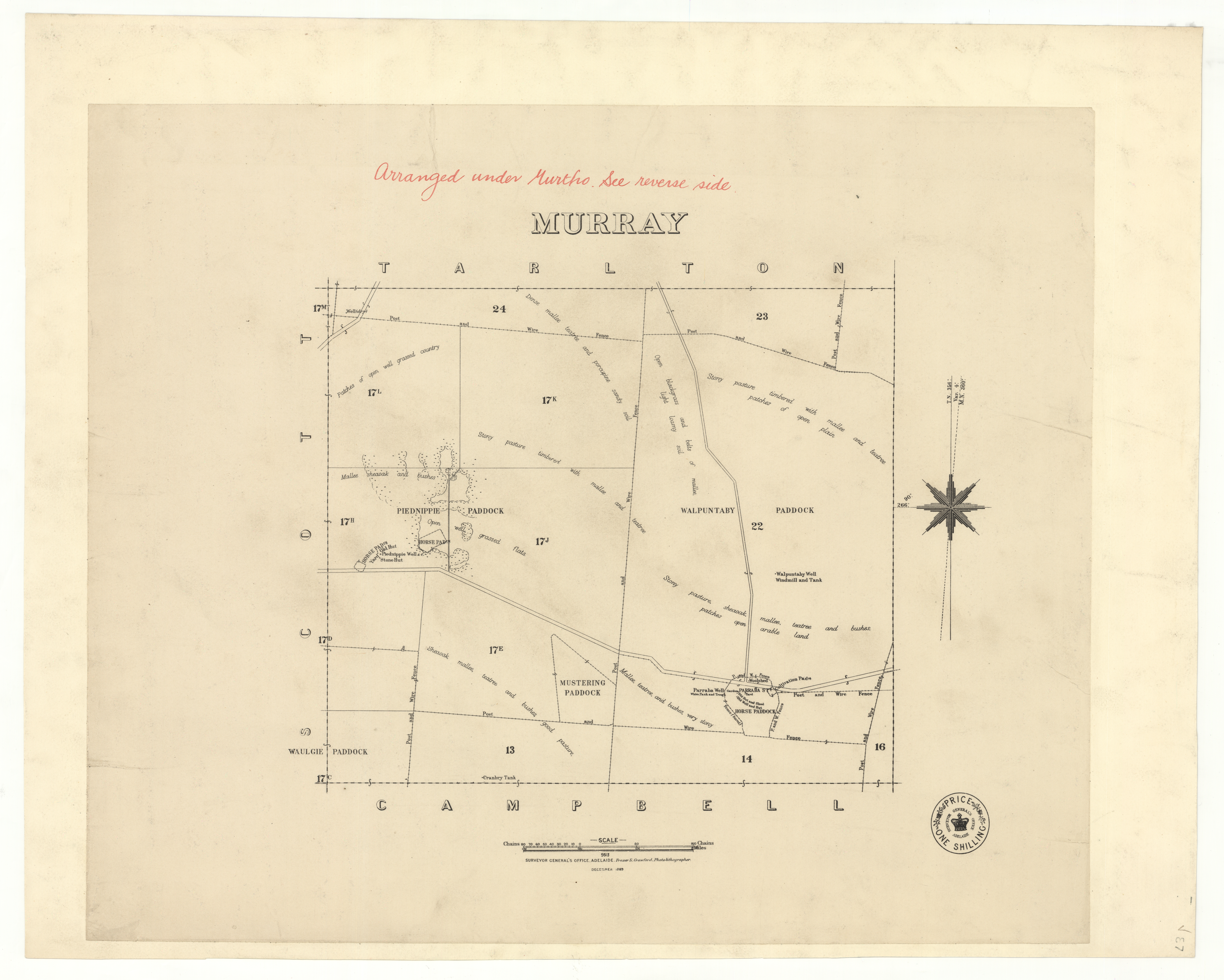
- Plan of the Hundred of Murray, 1889

- Coordinates: 32.728°S 134.531°E
- Established: 6 December 1888
- Area: 233 km^{2} (90.0 sq mi)
- County: Robinson
Lands administrative divisions around Murray:
Finlayson	Tarlton	Cungena
Scott	Murray	Chandada
Forrest	Campbell	Inkster

The Hundred of Murray is a cadastral hundred in the County of Robinson, South Australia. It occupies land midway between the towns of Streaky Bay and Poochera.

The hundred was proclaimed on 6 December 1888 by Governor William Robinson.

== History ==
The traditional owners of the area are the Wirangu and Nauo people, both speakers of the Wirangu language. The first European to sight the area was Matthew Flinders in 1802 on his voyage aboard the Investigator. The first European land exploration was that of John Hill and Samuel Stephens in 1839, followed by Edward John Eyre in the same year.
