= Hundred of Karcultaby =

Karcultaby
- Cadastral division
- Coordinates: 32.710°S 134.903°E
- Country: Australia
- State: South Australia
- Region: Eyre Peninsula
- LGA(s): Streaky Bay
- Established: 23 October 1913

Area
  - Total: 193 km^{2} (74.5 sq mi)
- County: Robinson
Lands administrative divisions around Karcultaby
Cungena	Kaldoonera	Bockelberg
Chandada	Karcultaby	Condada
Inkster	Moorkitabie	Carina

The Hundred of Karcultaby is a cadastral unit of hundred located on the northern Eyre Peninsula of South Australia spanning the townships of Poochera, Karcultaby and surrounds. One of the 24 hundreds of the County of Robinson, it was proclaimed in 1913 by Governor Day Bosanquet and named for Karcultaby Homestead, in the extreme southeast of the hundred.

Located within a vast low-rainfall wheat belt, the hundred has been locally governed since 1888 by the District Council of Streaky Bay, which was established in that year.

== See also ==
- Lands administrative divisions of South Australia
