= Hundred of Condada =

Condada
- Cadastral division
- Coordinates: 32.706°S 135.058°E
- Country: Australia
- State: South Australia
- Region: Eyre Peninsula
- LGA(s): Wudinna
- Established: 23 October 1913

Area
  - Total: 200 km^{2} (78 sq mi)
- County: Robinson
Lands administrative divisions around Condada
Kaldoonera	Bockelberg	Pastoral unincorporated
Karcultaby	Condada	Pildappa
Moorkitabie	Carina	Minnipa

The Hundred of Condada is a cadastral unit of hundred located on the northern Eyre Peninsula of South Australia spanning the township of Minnipa and surrounds. One of the 24 hundreds of the County of Robinson, it was proclaimed in 1913 by Governor Day Bosanquet and named for Condada Hill, in the southwest of the hundred.

The hundred is entirely spanned by the bounded locality of Minnipa, along with the adjacent hundreds of Pildappa to the east, Carinato the south, and most of the Hundred of Minnipa to the southeast (in which the actual township of Minnipa lies).

The hundred is located in the centre of a vast low-rainfall wheat belt and the surrounding countryside is gently undulating but broken by numerous wave-shaped granite outcrops (inselbergs). Much of the hundred is uncleared and thick with vegetation, but broadacre cropping takes place along the western border, fringing Poochera and Karcultaby.

Local administration of the hundred commenced in 1888 with the establishment of the District Council of Streaky Bay, which administered all of the County of Robinson not already administered by the District Council of Elliston. In 1925 the District Council of Minnipa, now called Wudinna District Council, was established and annexed Condada along with four other hundreds in the County of Robinson formerly in Streaky Bay council. Local governance of the hundred by Wudinna council has continued ever since.

== See also ==
- Lands administrative divisions of South Australia
