= Hundred of Yantanabie =

The Hundred of Yantanabie is a cadastral unit of hundred within County of Dufferin, South Australia.

The traditional custodians of the land were the Nawu people.

A township called Yantanabie was proclaimed in the westerly adjacent Hundred of Walpuppie in 1918.

== See also ==
- Lands administrative divisions of South Australia
- Yantanabie, South Australia
