= Hundred of Forrest =

Administrative division of South Australia

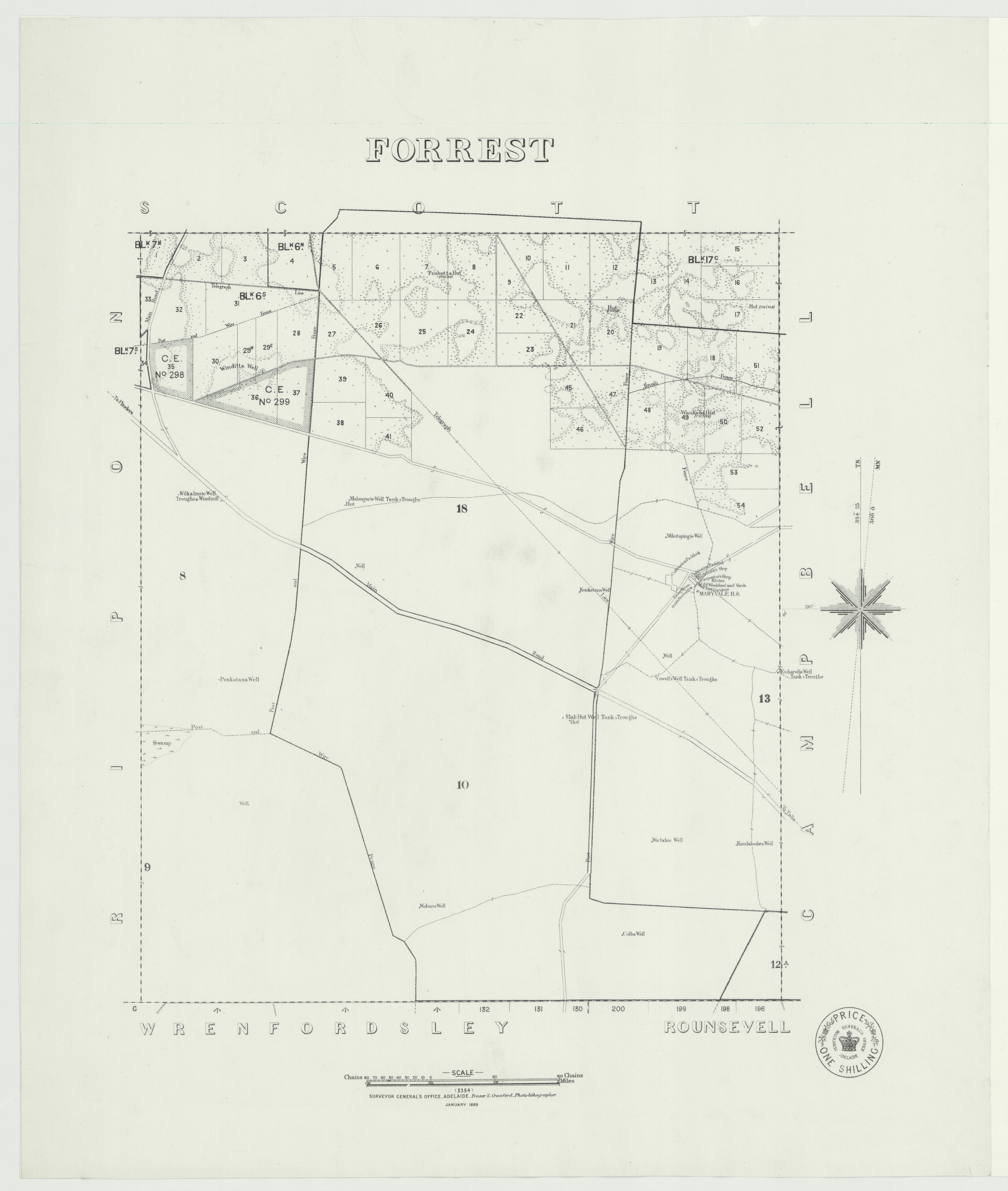
Hundred of Forrest, 1889

The Hundred of Forrest is a cadastral hundred of the County of Robinson in South Australia.

It is located at 32°47′50″S 134°12′40″E on the coast on the western side of the Eyre Peninsula, in South Australia just off the Flinders Highway 303 kilometres (188 mi) northwest of Port Lincoln and 727 kilometres (452 mi) west by road from Adelaide. The main population centre is the Streaky Bay hinterland.

== History ==
The traditional owners of the area are the Wirangu and Nauo people, both speakers of the Wirangu language. The first European to sight the area was Dutch explorer Pieter Nuyts, in 1627 in the Golden Zeepaard and in 1802 Matthew Flinders. Flinders named Streaky Bay whilst on his voyage in the Investigator. The first European land exploration was that of John Hill and Samuel Stephens in 1839, followed by Edward John Eyrein the same year.

== Climate ==
The climate is described as average in summer and winter with an average rainfall of 378 millimetres (14.9 in) per year.
