= Hundred of Hague =

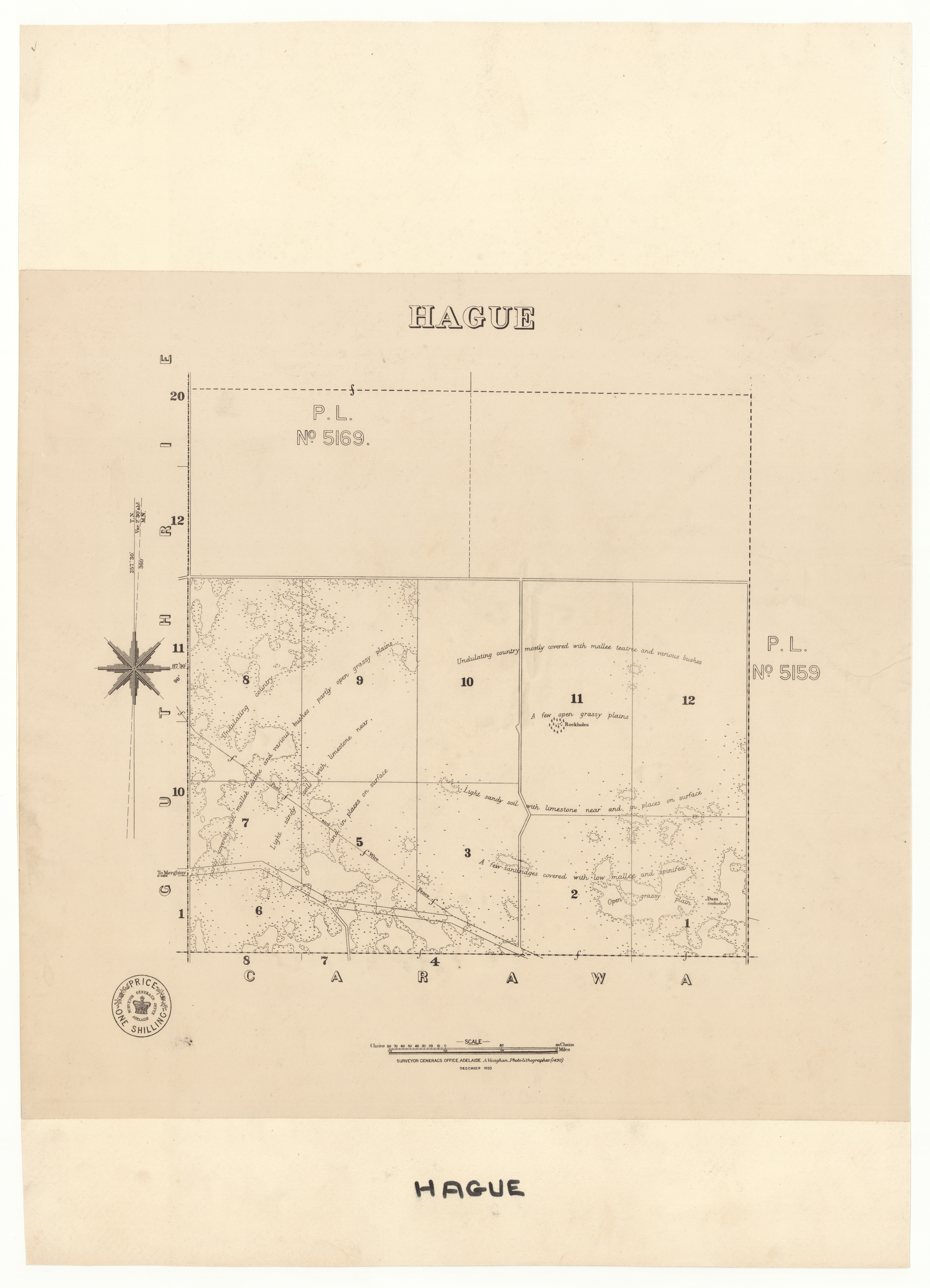
Hundred of Hague, 1893

The Hundred of Hague is a hundred within County of Dufferin, South Australia and was founded in 1913.

The traditional owners of the land are the Wirangu peoples.

The locality of Pureba, South Australia and the Pureba Conservation Park lie to the north.

== See also ==
- Lands administrative divisions of South Australia
