= Wirangu =

Wirangu may be,

- Wirangu people
- Wirangu language
