= Yantanabie =

Yantanabie may refer to:

- Yantanabie, South Australia
- Hundred of Yantanabie, South Australia
