= Hundred of Campbell =

Administrative division of South Australia

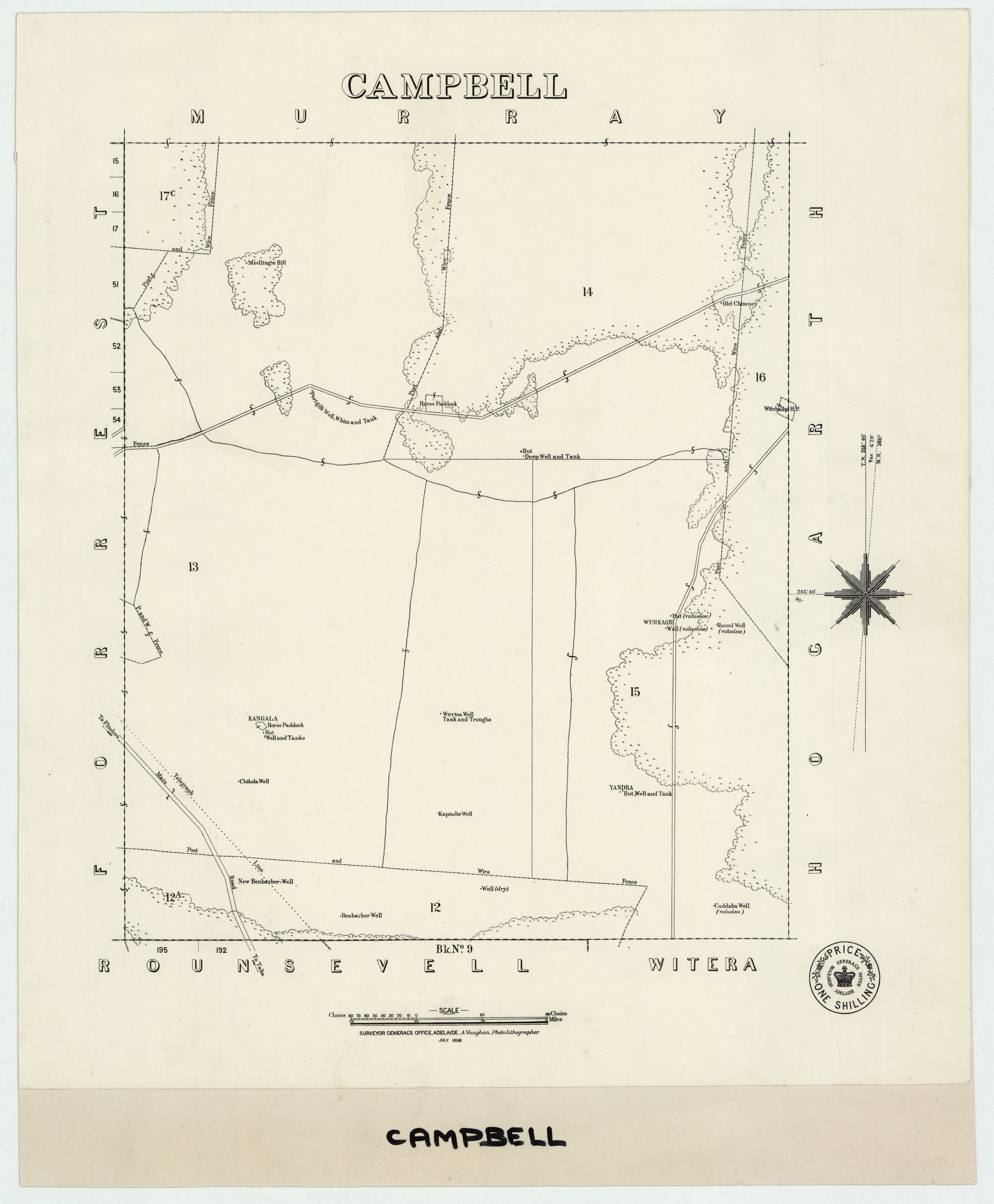
Hundred of Campbell, 1896

The Hundred of Campbell is a cadastral hundred of the County of Robinson in South Australia.

The main town in the hundred is Maryvale.

== History ==
The traditional owners of the area are the Wirangu and Nauo people, both speakers of the Wirangu language. The first European to sight the area was Dutch explorer Pieter Nuyts, in 1627 in the Gulden Zeepaard, and, in 1802, Matthew Flinders on his voyage in the Investigator. Flinders named the nearby Streaky Bay.

The first European land exploration was that of John Hill and Samuel Stephens in 1839, followed by Edward John Eyre in the same year.
