= Hundred of Nunnyah =

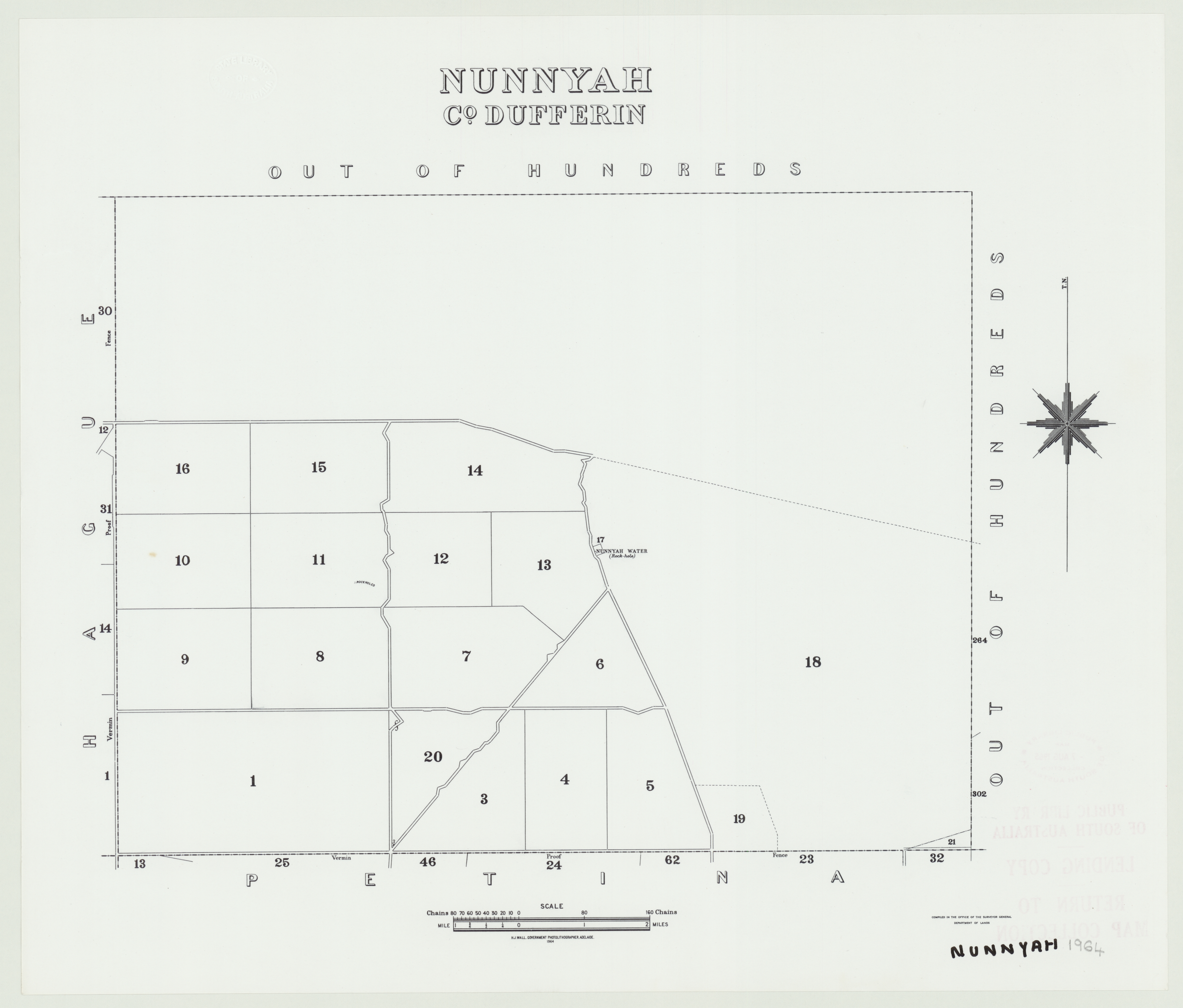
Hundred of Nunnyah, 1964

The Hundred of Nunnyah is a hundred within County of Dufferin, South Australia. and was founded in 1913.

The traditional owners of the hundred are the Wirangu peoples.

== See also ==
- Lands administrative divisions of South Australia
