= Hundred of Petina =

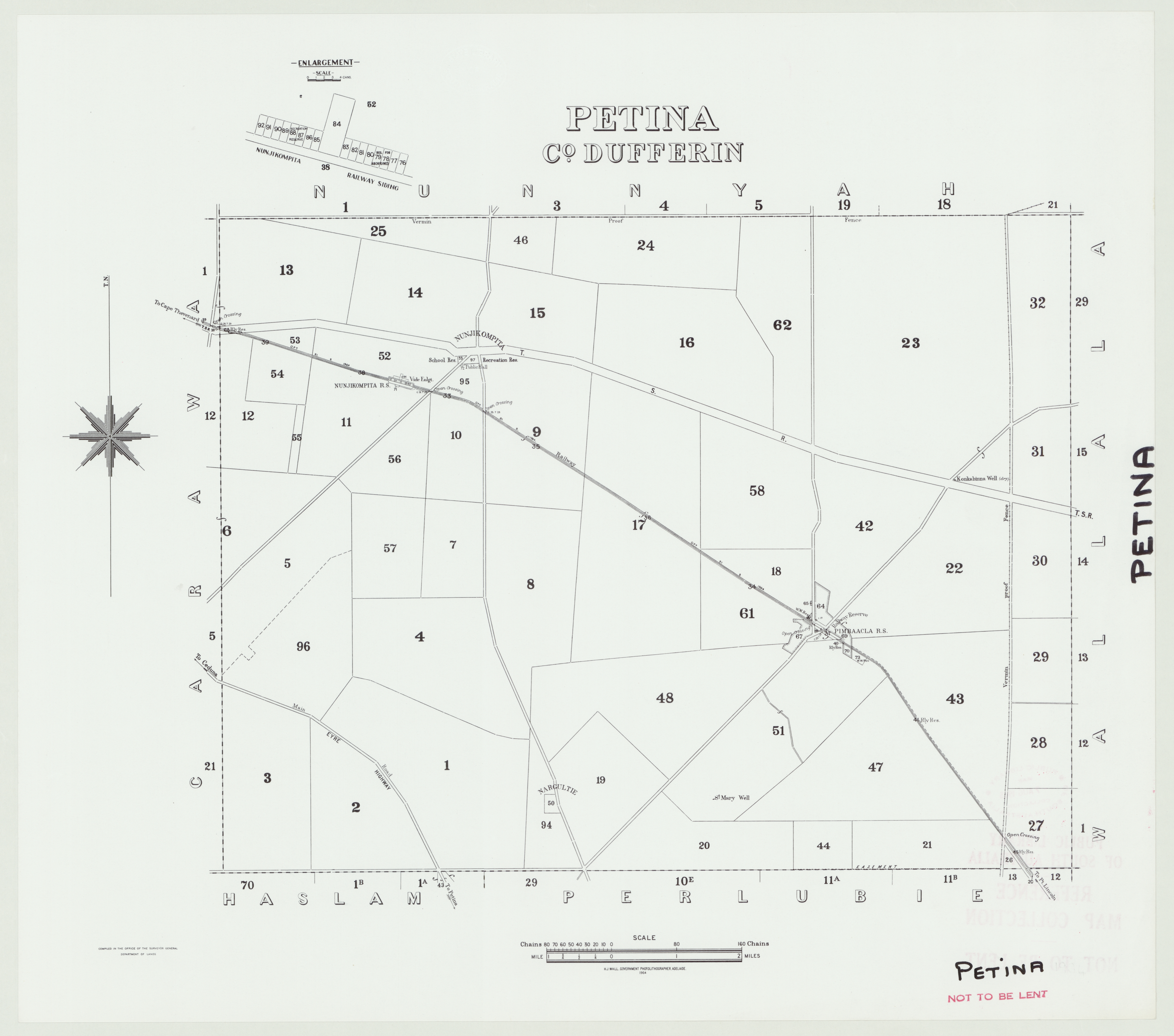
Hundred of Petina, 1964

The Hundred of Petina is a hundred within County of Dufferin, South Australia and was proclaimed in 1893.

The traditional owners of the hundred are the Wirangu peoples.

Nunjikompita and Pimbaacla are railway stations on the Eyre Peninsula Railway within the hundred.

== See also ==
Lands administrative divisions of South Australia
