= Hundred of Perlubie =

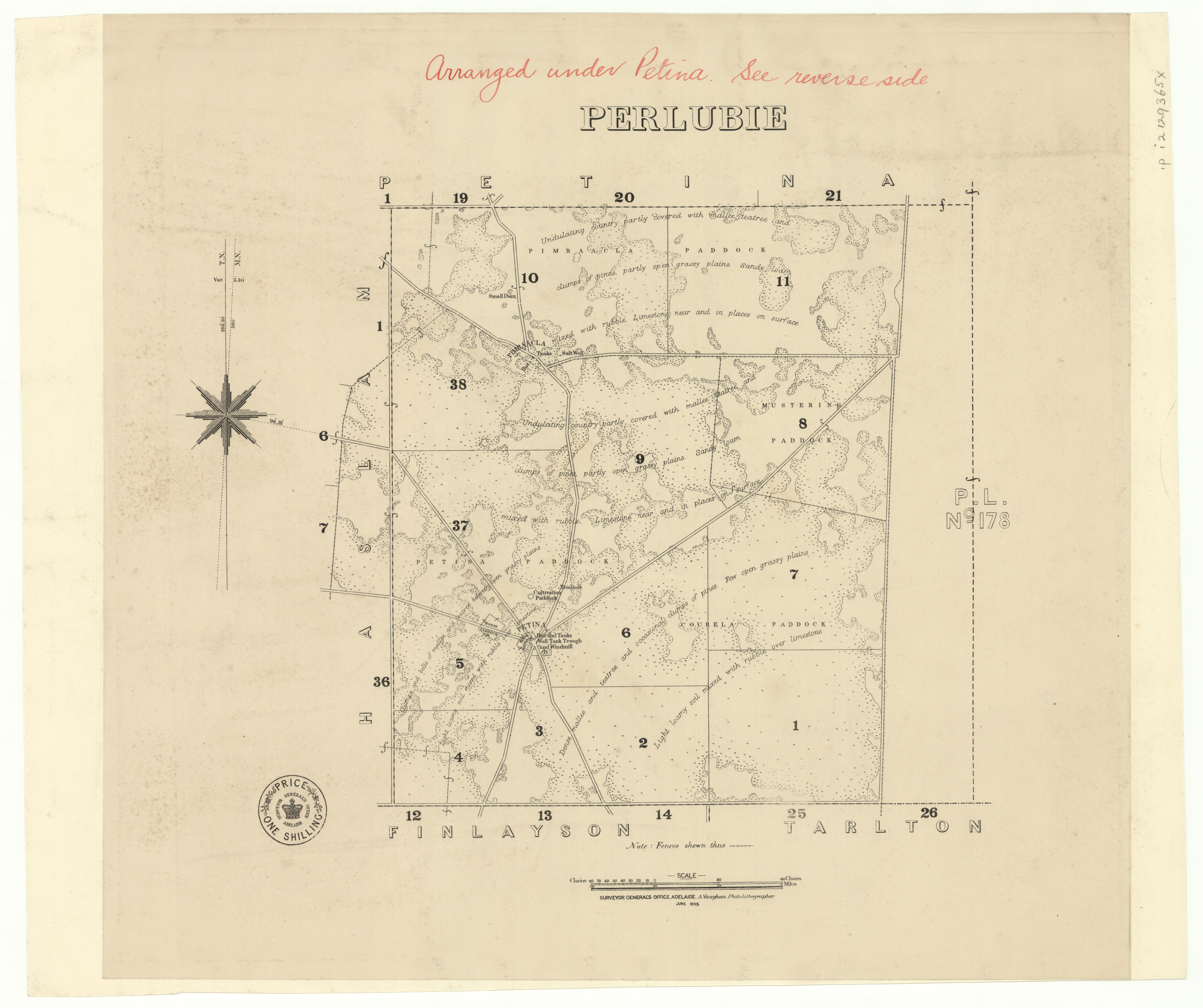
Hundred of Perlubie, 1895

The Hundred of Perlubie is a hundred within County of Dufferin, South Australia and was proclaimed in 1895.

The traditional owners of the land are the Wirangu peoples.

== See also ==
Lands administrative divisions of South Australia
