= Hundred of Witera =

Administrative division in South Australia

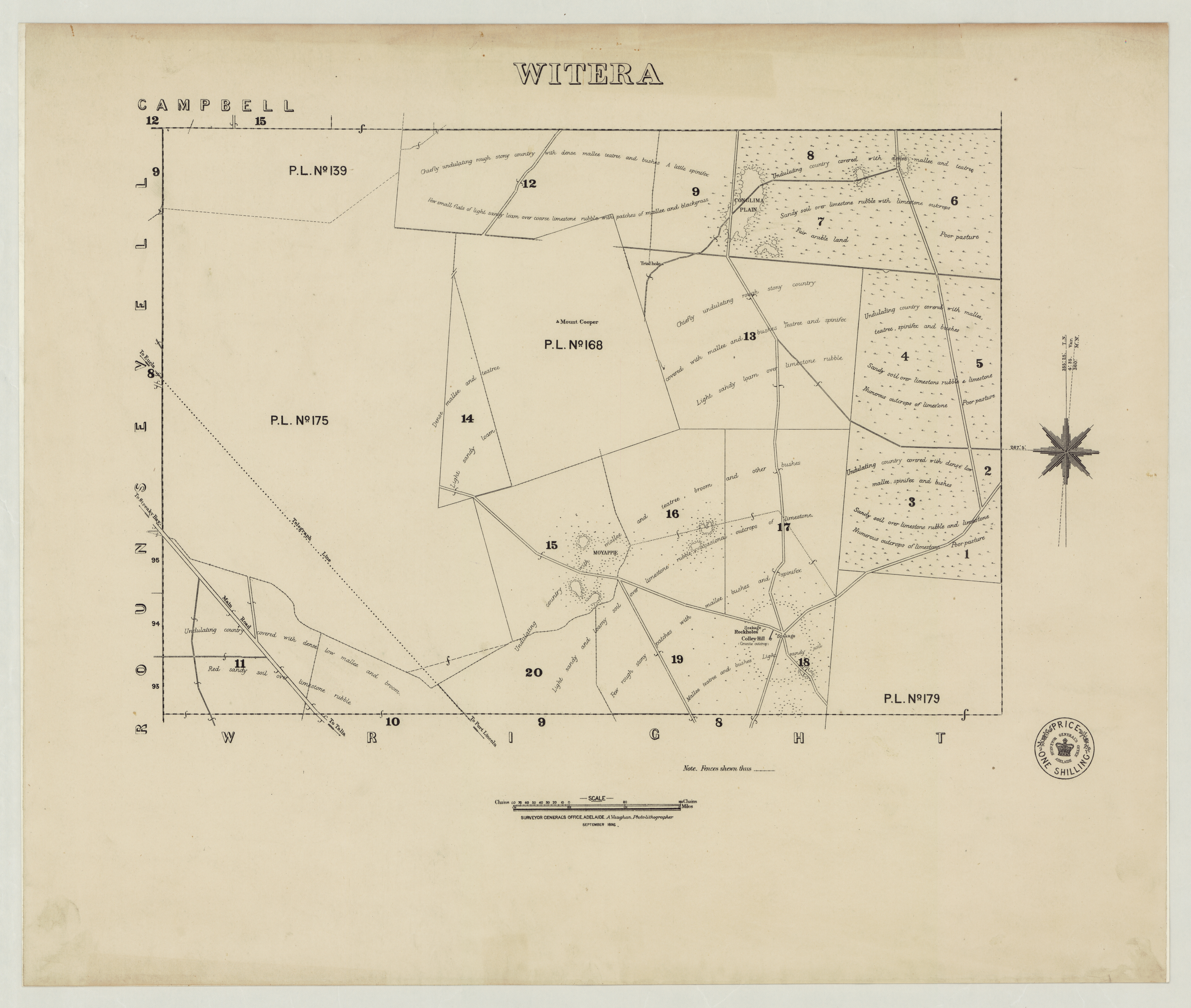
Hundred of Witera, 1896

The Hundred of Witera is a cadastral hundred of the County of Robinson in South Australia.

== History ==
The traditional owners of the area are the Wirangu and Nauo people. In 1802 Matthew Flinders. Flinders named Streaky Bay whilst on his voyage in the Investigator. The first European land exploration was that of John Hill and Samuel Stephens in 1839, followed by Edward John Eyre in the same year.

== Climate ==
The climate is described as average in summer and winter with an average rainfall of 378 millimetres (14.9 in) per year.
