= Hundred of Carawa =

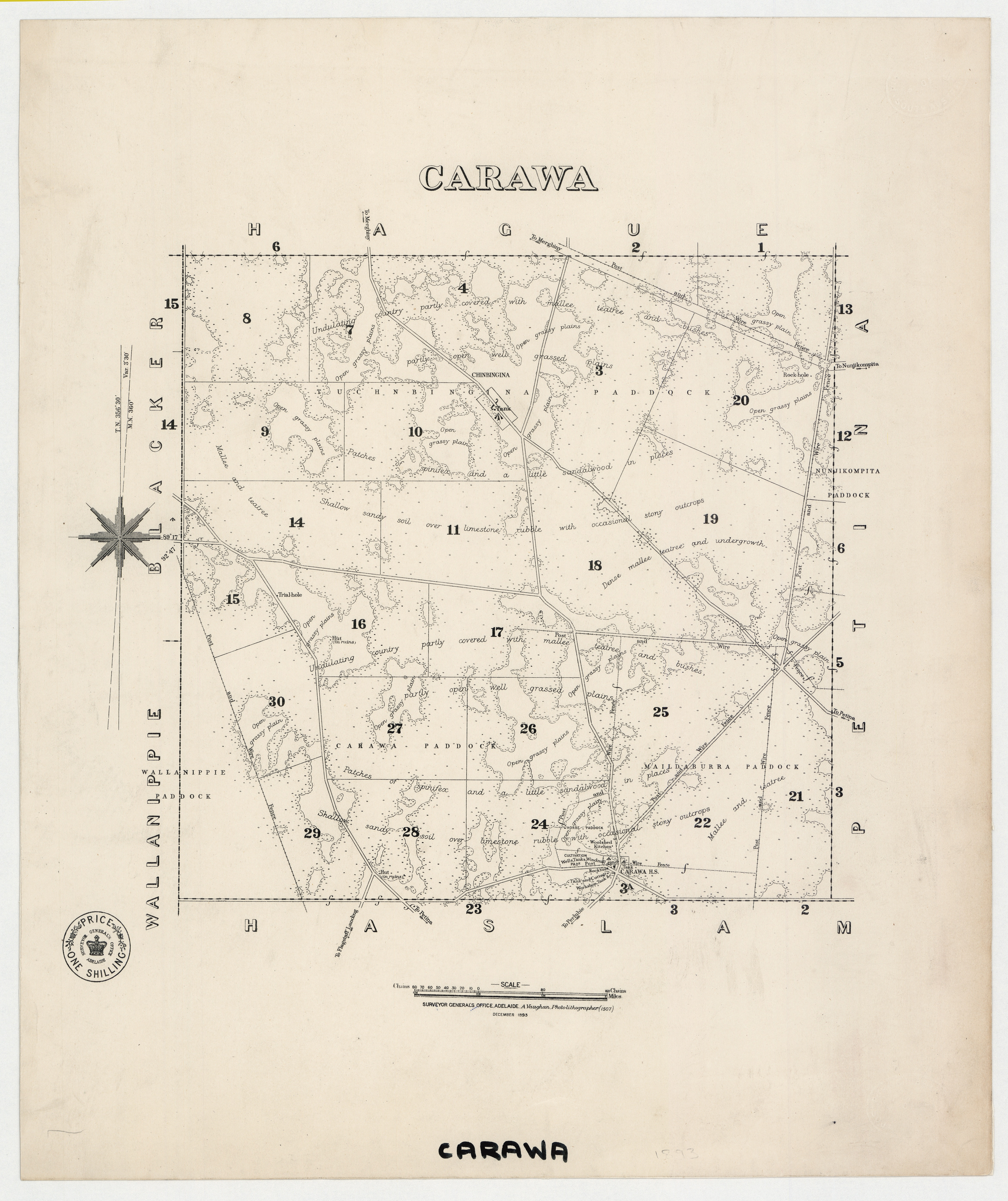
Hundred of Carawa, 1898

The Hundred of Carawa is a hundred within County of Dufferin, South Australia. The hundred lies north east of Ceduna, South Australia and was proclaimed in 1893.

The traditional owners of the land are the Wirangu tribes.

== See also ==
- Lands administrative divisions of South Australia
