= Leioproctus dasypus =

Scientific classification
- Kingdom: Animalia
- Phylum: Arthropoda
- Clade: Pancrustacea
- Class: Insecta
- Order: Hymenoptera
- Family: Colletidae
- Genus: Leioproctus
- Species: L. dasypus

Binomial name
- Leioproctus dasypus Maynard 2013

Synonyms
- Goniocolletes dasypus Maynard, 2013

Species of bee

Leioproctus dasypus, or Leioproctus (Goniocolletes) dasypus, is a species of bee in the family Colletidae and subfamily Colletinae. It is endemic to Australia. It was described by Australian entomologist Glynn Maynard in 2013.

== Etymology ==
The specific epithet dasypus (Greek: "hairy" + "foot") is an anatomical reference to the hair on the male mid tibia.

== Description ==
Female body length is about 12 mm, male body length 11 mm. Integumental colouration is mainly black; the female metasoma orange. The hair is mostly white.

== Distribution and habitat ==
The species occurs in southern Australia. The type locality is 28 km north-east of Wirrulla, South Australia.

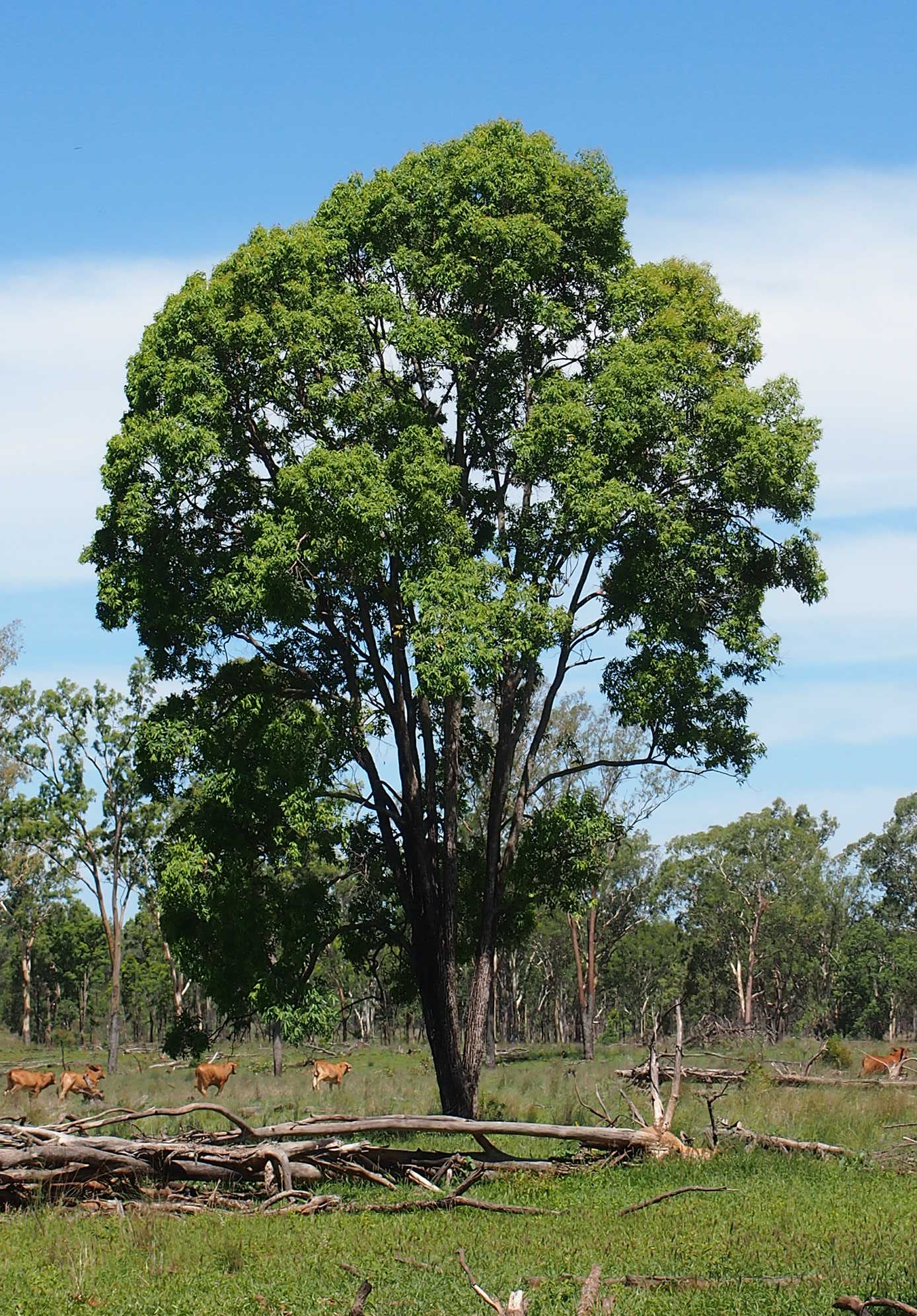
Angophora floribunda tree (rough-barked apple), a forage plant of the bees

== Behaviour ==
The adults are flying mellivores. Flowering plants visited by the bees include Angophora floribunda, as well as Eucalyptus species.

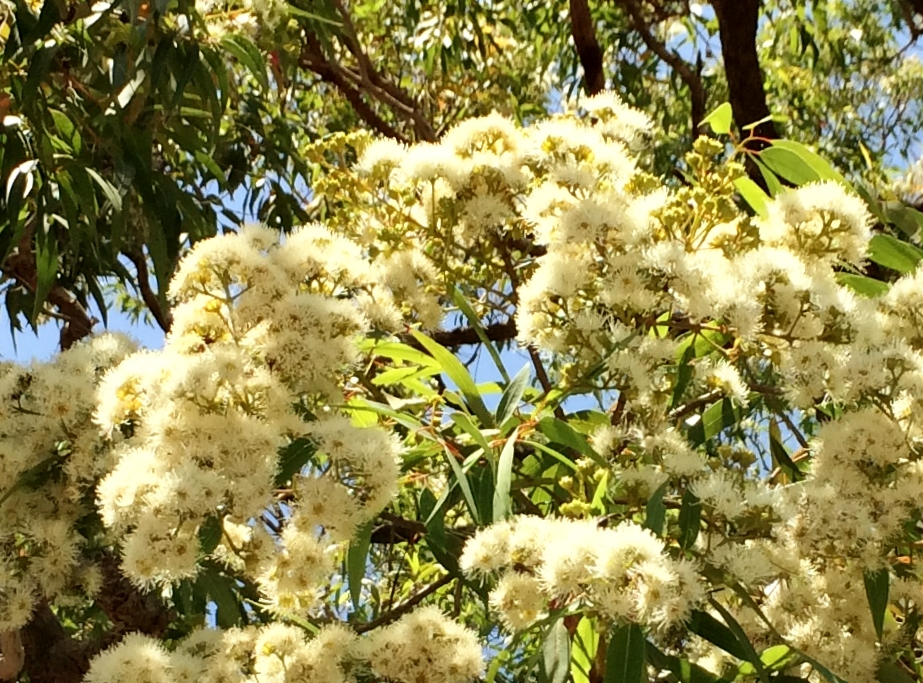
Angophora floribunda inflorescence
