= Hundred of Wallala =

The Hundred of Wallala is a cadastral unit of hundred in the County of Dufferin, South Australia.

The traditional custodians of the land were the Nawu people.

== See also ==
- Lands administrative divisions of South Australia
