= Hundred of Walpuppie =

The Hundred of Walpuppie is a cadastral hundred of South Australia in the County of Dufferin located at 32°24′0″S 134°32′0″E. The main population centre of the hundred is the grain belt town of Wirrulla. The traditional owners of the hundred are the Wirangu peoples.

The town of Yantanabie in the Hundred of Walpuppie, 24 km South-East of Wirrulla, was proclaimed on 7 March 1918.
