= Pureba =

Pureba may refer to:

- Pureba, South Australia, a locality in western South Australia
- Pureba Conservation Park, a conservation park in the locality, one of the Yellabinna Reserves
- Hundred of Pureba, a cadastral area overlapping the above
