= Hundred of Wrenfordsley =

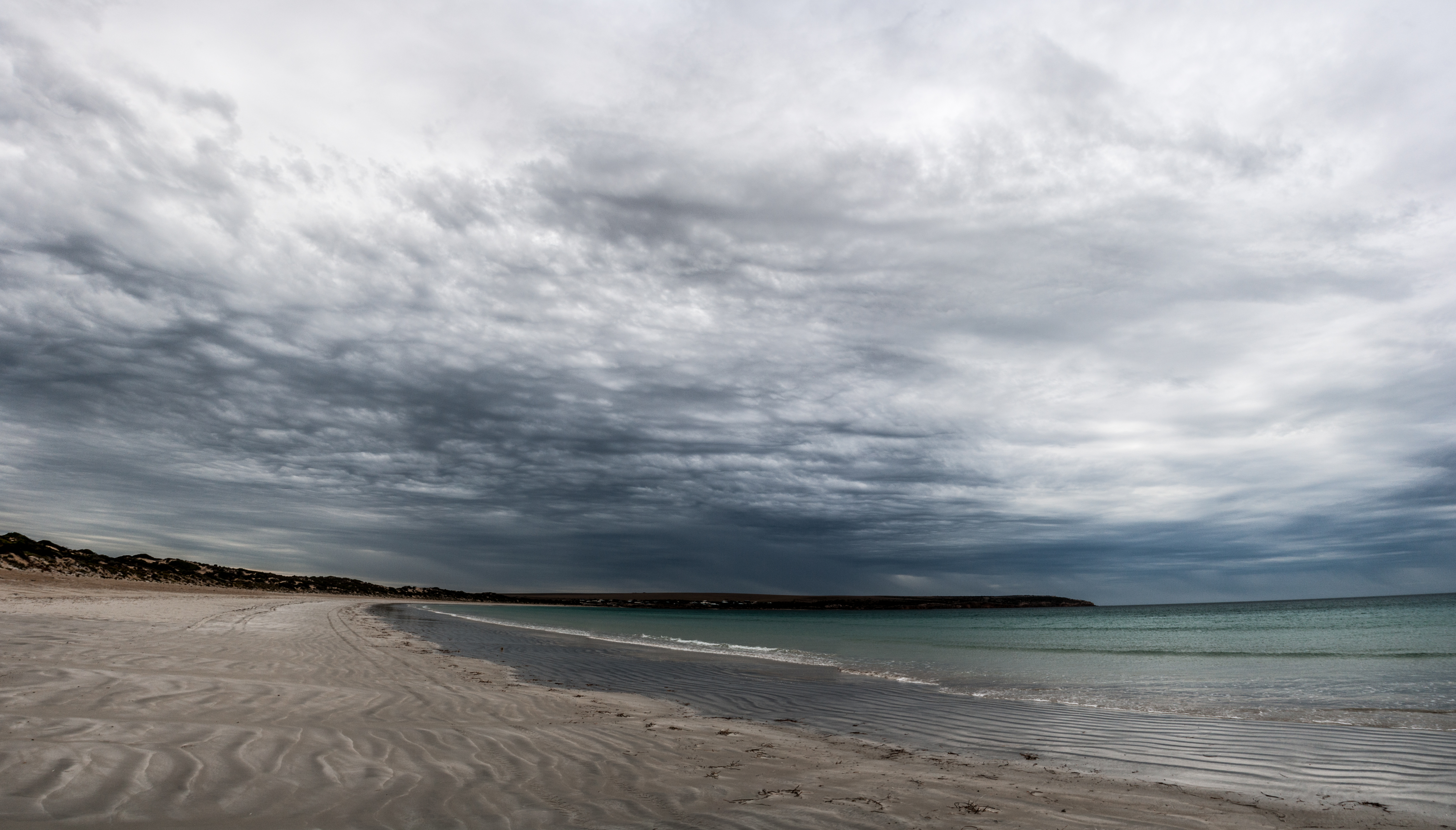
Sceale Bay on the west coast of the Hundred of Wrenfordsley

The Hundred of Wrenfordsley is a cadastral hundred of County of Robinson in South Australia. The main town is the village of Yanera, South Australia. It is located at Latitude:-33.049060821 and Longitude: 134.325744628.
