= County of Dufferin =

Dufferin
- Cadastral division
- Coordinates: 32.177°S 134.609°E
- Country: Australia
- State: South Australia
- LGA(s): District Council of Ceduna District Council of Streaky Bay

Area
  - Total: 6,790 km^{2} (2,623 sq mi)
Lands administrative divisions around Dufferin
Way
Way	Dufferin	Bosanquet
Ocean	Robinson	Bosanquet

The County of Dufferin is one of the 49 counties of South Australia on the state's west coast. It was proclaimed in 1889 and named for Frederick, Lord Dufferin, a prominent British diplomat of the day.

It covers a portion of the state adjoining the west coast north of Streaky Bay, including all but the western tip of Pureba Conservation Park. This includes parts of the contemporary local government areas of Ceduna District and Streaky Bay District councils.

== Hundreds ==
The County of Dufferin contains the following 11 hundreds, covering approximately the south western half of its total area:

- Hundred of Pureba (Pureba)
- Hundred of Hague (Mudamuckla, Puntabie, Chinbingina, Nunjikompita)
- Hundred of Nunnyah (Pureba, Nunjikompita)
- Hundred of Carawa (Carawa, Chinbingina)
- Hundred of Petina (Nunjikompita, Pimbaacla)
- Hundred of Wallala (Wallala)
- Hundred of Koolgera (Pureba, Koolgera)
- Hundred of Haslam (Haslam, Petina)
- Hundred of Perlubie (Pimbaacla, Petina)
- Hundred of Walpuppie (Wirrulla, Yantanabie)
- Hundred of Yantanabie (Yantanabie)
