= Hundred of Wright =

Administrative division in South Australia

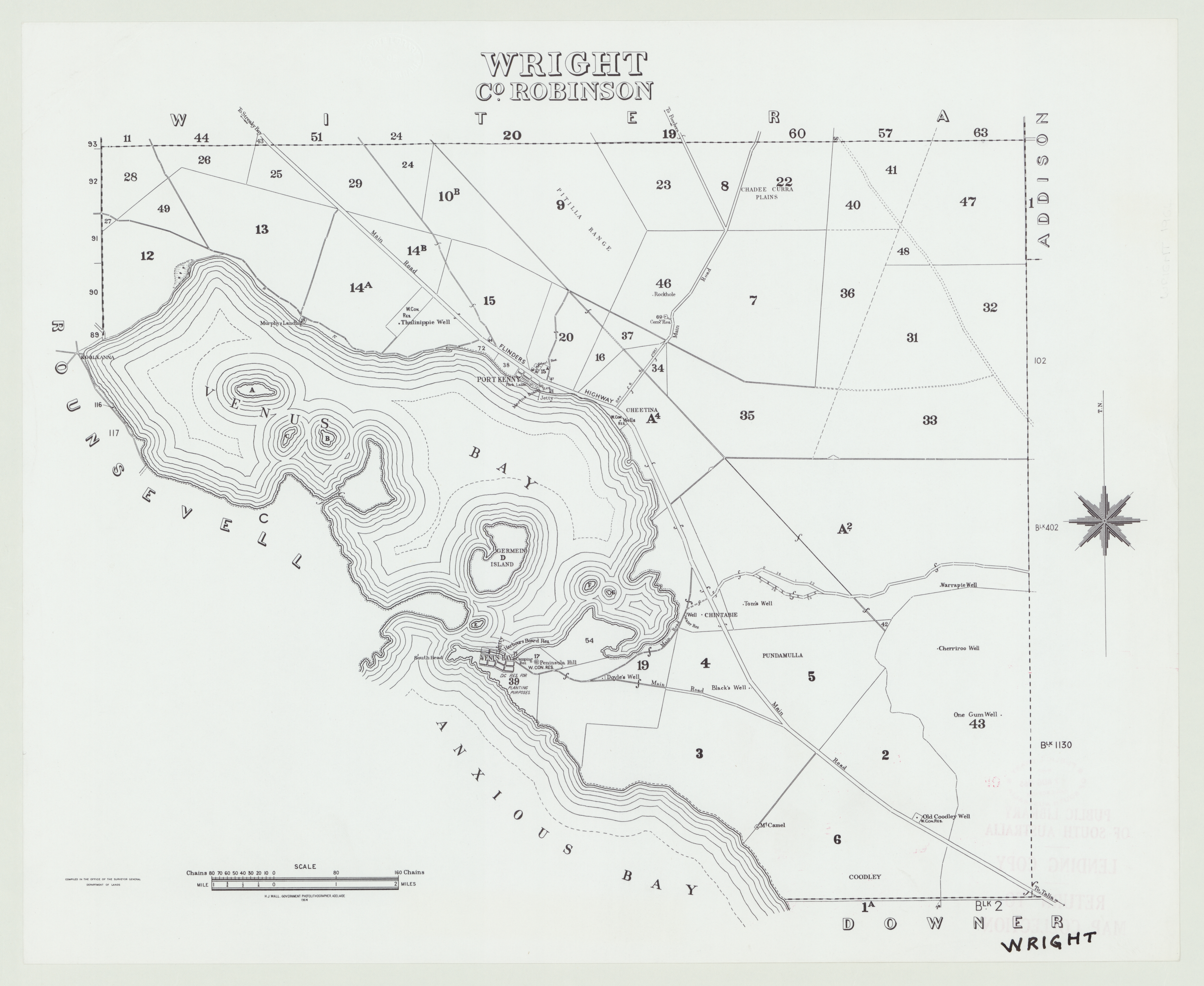
Hundred of Wright, 1964

The Hundred of Wright is a cadastral hundred of County of Robinson in South Australia. It spans the west coast of the state at Venus Bay (33°10′S 134°41′E), 655 kilometres (407 mi) west of Adelaide.

== History ==
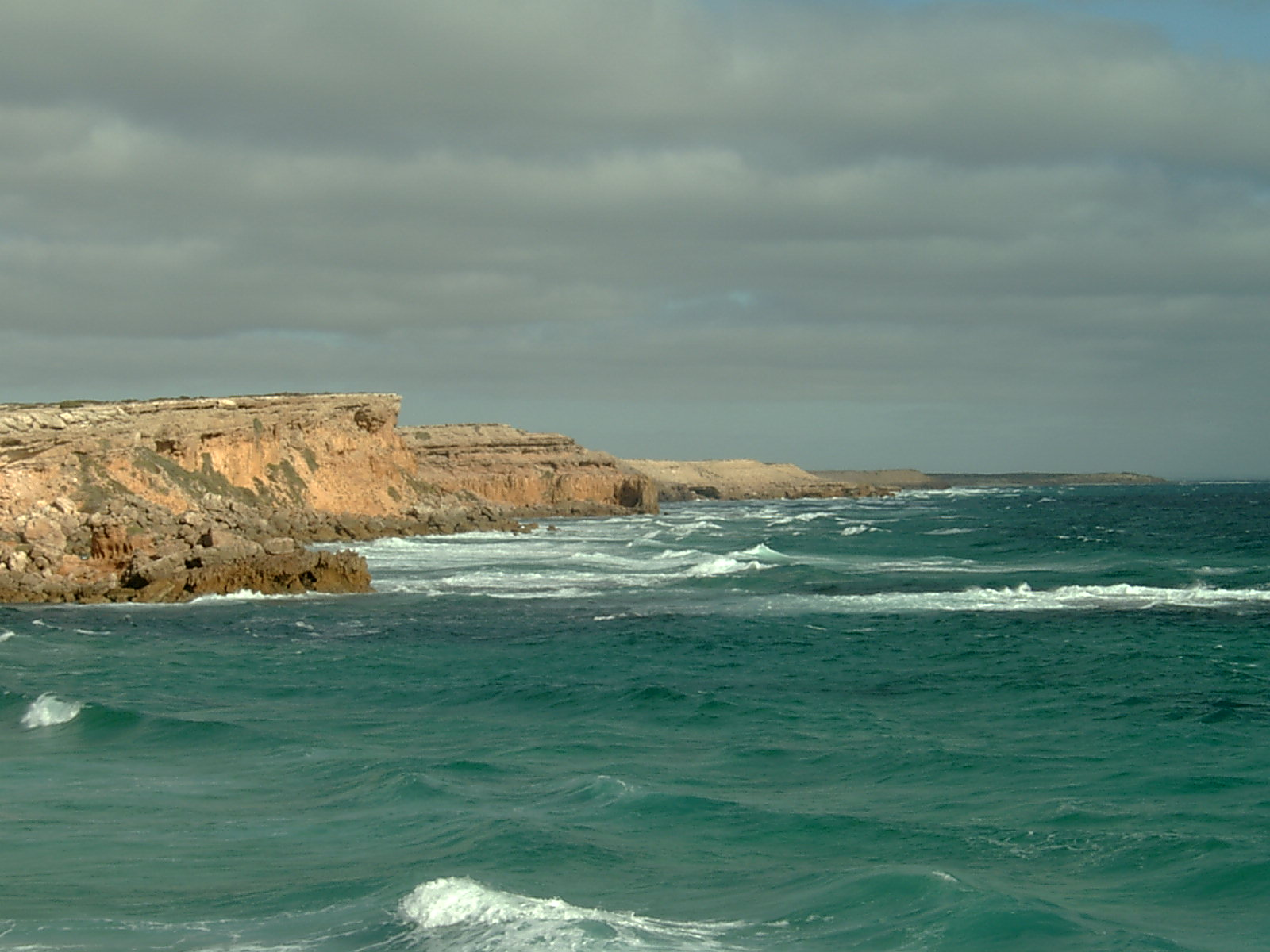
Venus Bay in the Hundred of Wright

The traditional owners of the area were the Nauo Aboriginal people.

The first European to the area was Dutch explorer Pieter Nuyts, in 1627 in the Gulden Zeepaard.

In 1802 Matthew Flinders came past the district whilst on his voyage in the Investigator. The first European land exploration was that of John Hill and Samuel Stephens in 1839, followed shortly after by Edward John Eyre in the same year.
