= County of Robinson =

Robinson South Australia
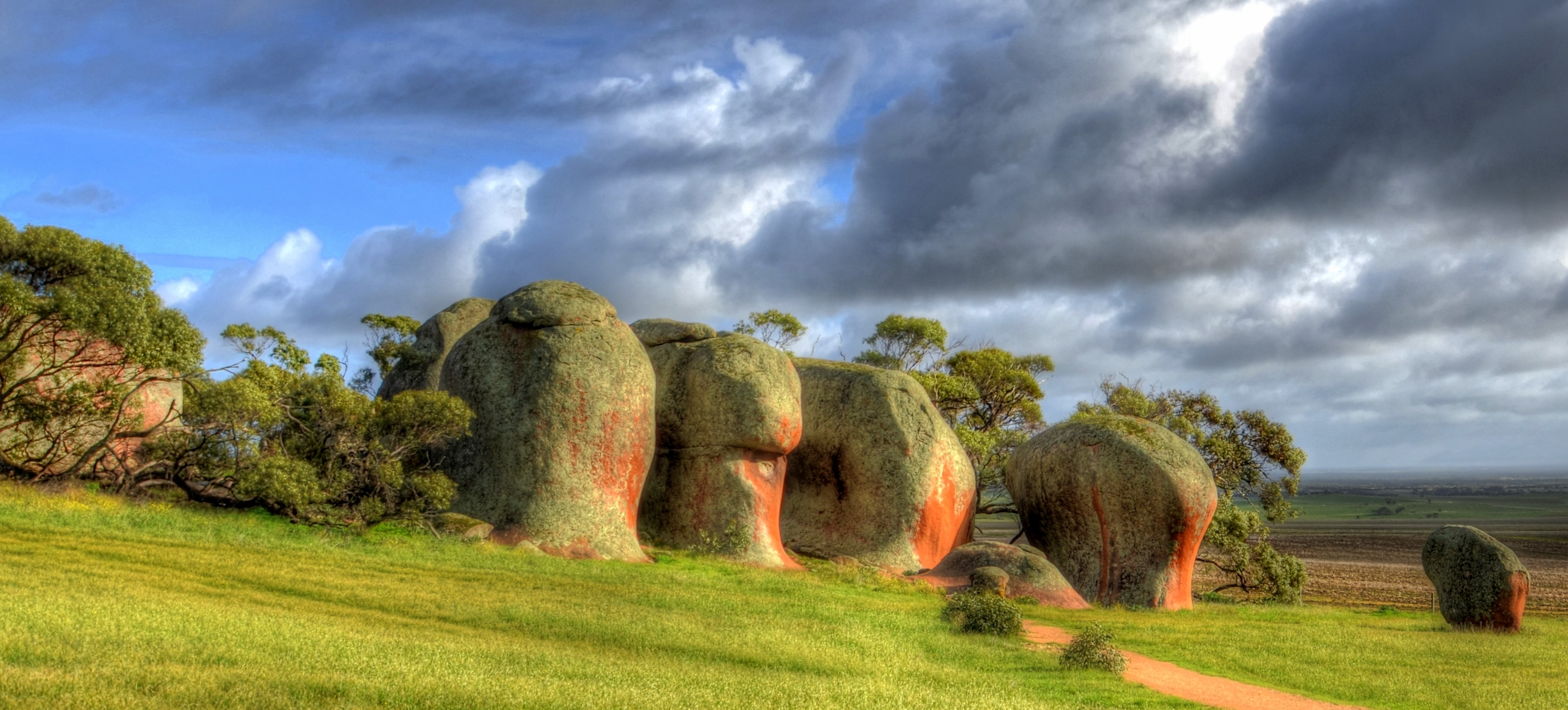
- Murphy's Haystacks, a rock formation, at Mortana in the Hundred of Rounsevell

- Coordinates: 32.88°S 134.70°E
- Established: 1883
- Area: 6,926 km^{2} (2,674.1 sq mi)
Lands administrative divisions around Robinson:
Way	Dufferin; Bosanquet	Hore-Ruthven
Ocean	Robinson	Le Hunte
Ocean	Ocean	Musgrave

The County of Robinson is one of the 49 counties of South Australia. It was proclaimed in 1883 by Governor William Robinson who named it after himself. It lies on the north west coast of Eyre Peninsula stretching from Streaky Bay inland to include the Gawler Ranges Conservation Park at the southern cusp of the Gawler Ranges.

Local government spanning the county includes the District Council of Streaky Bay and District Council of Elliston, both established in 1888, and the District Council of Wudinna, established in 1925.

== Hundreds ==
The County of Robinson is divided into the following 24 hundreds which cross over the Streaky Bay district and Wudinna district council areas:

- Hundred of Finlayson (Perlubie, Petina)
- Hundred of Tarlton (Chilpenunda)
- Hundred of Cungena (Cungena)
- Hundred of Kaldoonera (Kaldoonera)
- Hundred of Bockelberg (Bockelberg)
- Hundred of Scott (Eba Anchorage, Piednippie)
- Hundred of Murray (Piednippie, Chandada)
- Hundred of Chandada (Chandada)
- Hundred of Karcultaby (Poochera, Karcultaby)
- Hundred of Condada (Minnipa)
- Hundred of Ripon (Streaky Bay, Yanerbie)
- Hundred of Forrest (Streaky Bay, Yanerbie)
- Hundred of Campbell (Maryvale)
- Hundred of Inkster (Inkster)
- Hundred of Moorkitabie (Karcultaby)
- Hundred of Carina (Minnipa)
- Hundred of Wrenfordsley (Sceale Bay, Calca, Baird Bay)
- Hundred of Rounsevell (Mortana, Tyringa, Witera)
- Hundred of Witera (Colley, Mount Cooper)
- Hundred of Addison (Karcultaby)
- Hundred of Travers (Mount Damper)
- Hundred of Wright (Venus Bay, Port Kenny)
- Hundred of Downer (Talia)
- Hundred of Wallis (Mount Damper, Cocata)

A twenty fifth county subdivision, the Hundred of McBeath, was planned or possibly proclaimed between the hundreds of Wright, Addison, Travers, Wallis and Downer, but the name was never gazetted.
