= Hundred of Rounsevell =

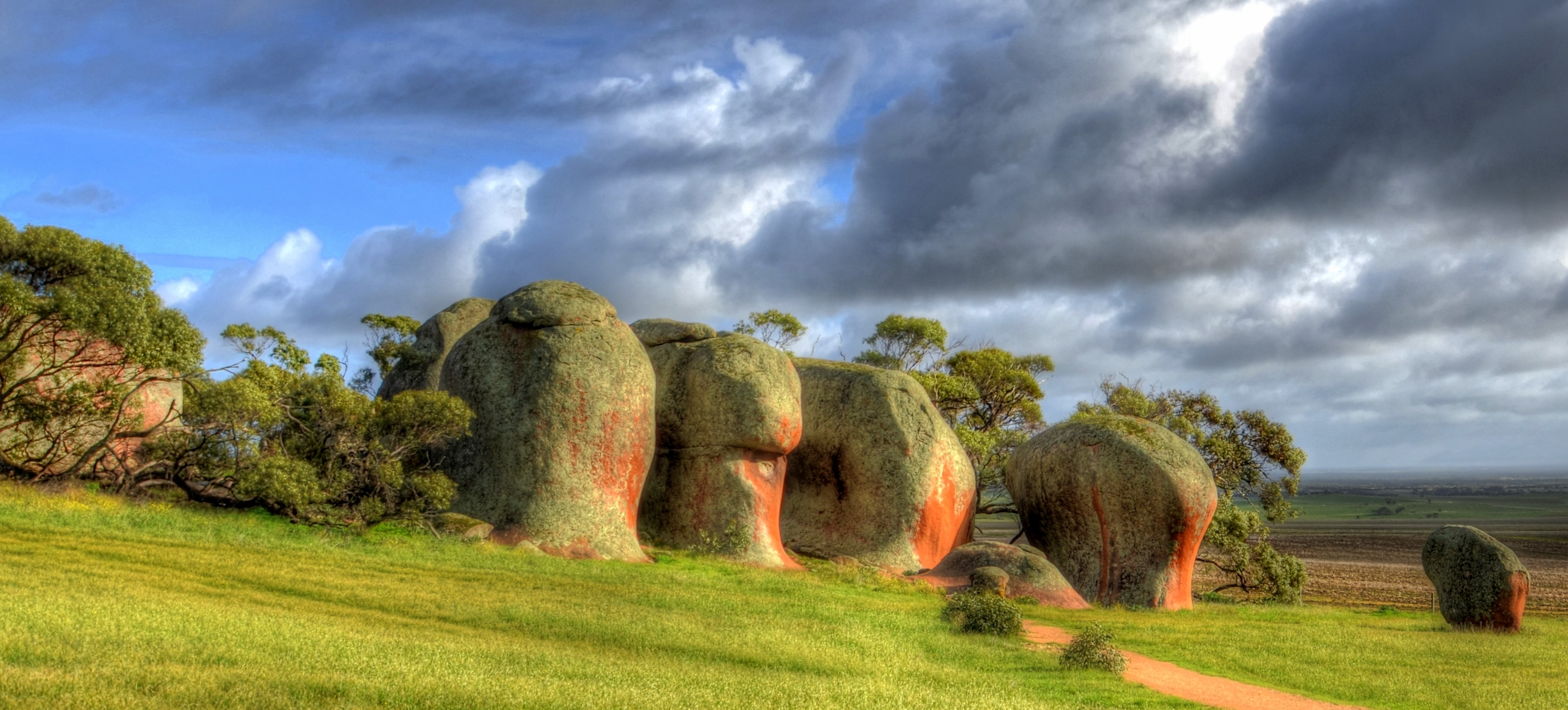
Murphy's Haystacks geological formation within the hundred

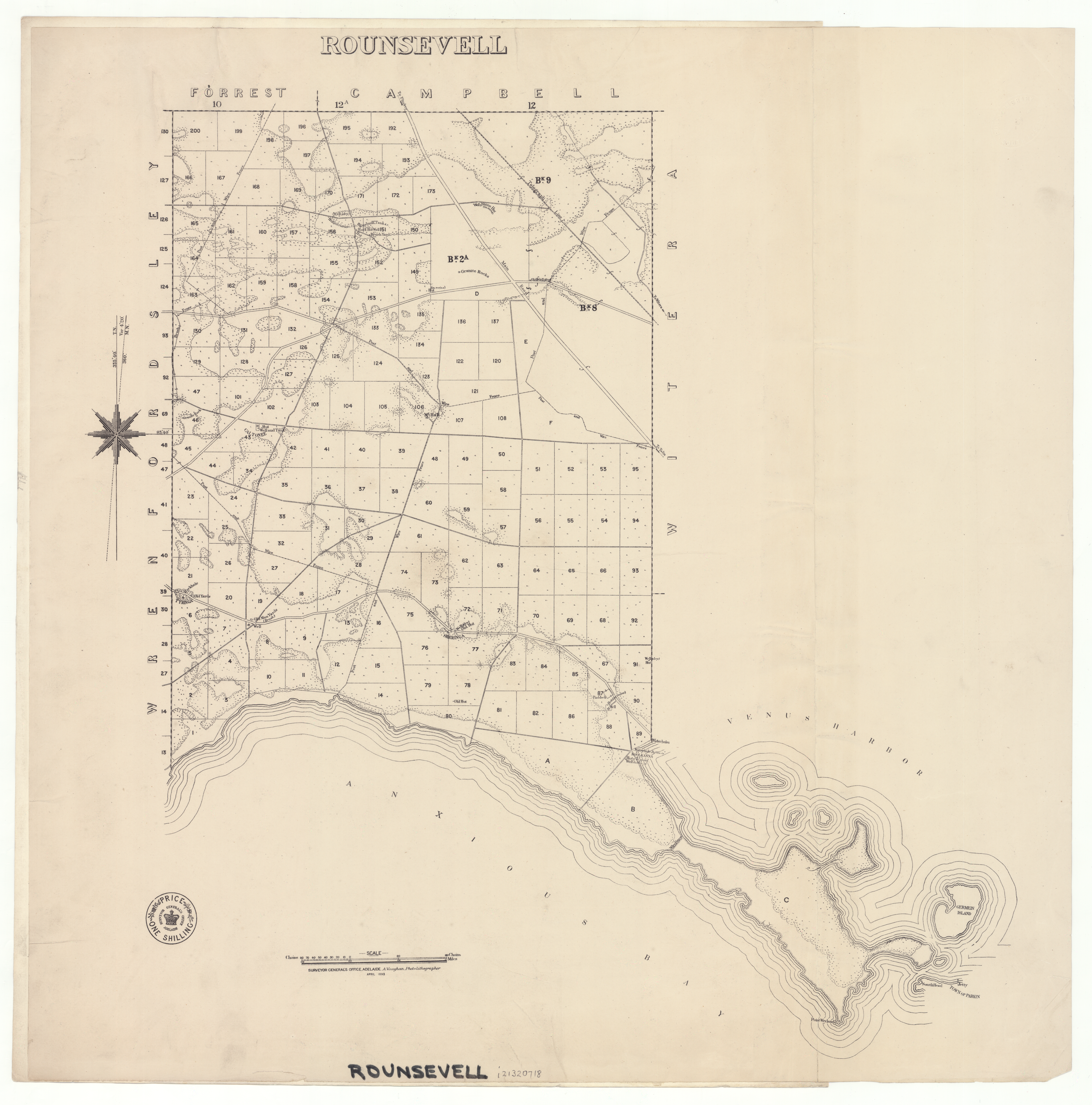
Hundred of Rounsevell in 1893.

The Hundred of Rounsevell is a cadastral hundred of the County of Robinson in South Australia. The main town of the hundred is Mortana.
