= Cungena, South Australia =

Cungena South Australia
- Coordinates: 32.584°S 134.709°E
- Population: 25 (SAL 2021)
- Established: 1917
- Postcode(s): 5660
- LGA(s): District Council of Streaky Bay
- State electorate(s): Flinders
- Federal division(s): Grey
Localities around Cungena:
	Yantanabie
Chilpenunda	Cungena	Kaldoo
	Chandada	Poochera

Cungena is a settlement in South Australia. It is in the District Council of Streaky Bay, on the Eyre Highway between Kyancutta and Ceduna. The town was surveyed and proclaimed in 1917, named after the Hundred of Cungena proclaimed in 1913. Cungena also includes the former town of Capietha.

The bulk grain silos in the town are no longer serviced by the Eyre Peninsula Railway, but are served by road and were used for three grades of wheat in the 2016-17 harvest season.
