= Hundred of Wallis =

Administrative division in South Australia

The Hundred of Wallis is a cadastral hundred of County of Robinson in South Australia.

== History ==
The traditional owners of the area were the Nauo Aboriginal people. In 1802 Matthew Flinders came past the district whilst on his voyage in the Investigator. The first European land exploration was that of John Hill and Samuel Stephens in 1839, followed shortly after by Edward John Eyre in the same year.
