= Hundred of Carina =

The Hundred of Carina is a cadastral hundred of County of Robinson in South Australia. The hundred is located at 32°51′S 135°09′E and the main town of the hundred is Minnipa, 250 kilometres (160 mi) north west of Port Lincoln. The postcode is 5654
