= Yantanabie, South Australia =

Yantanabie South Australia
- Coordinates: 32°29′05″S 134°38′06″E
- Population: 15 (2016 census) (Note: For the 2016 census, the ‘State Suburb of Yantanabie’ consisted of the locality of Yantanabie and a portion of the locality of Pureba.)
- Established: 7 March 1918 (town); 12 April 2001 (locality)
- Postcode(s): 5661
- Elevation: 93 m (305 ft)Railway Station
- Time zone: ACST (UTC+9:30)
  - Summer (DST): ACDT (UTC+10:30)
- Location: 456 km (283 mi) NW of Adelaide; 53 km (33 mi) NE of Streaky Bay
- LGA(s): District Council of Streaky Bay
- Region: Eyre Western
- County: Dufferin; Robinson
- State electorate(s): Flinders
- Federal division(s): Grey
| Mean max temp | Mean min temp | Annual rainfall |
| 23.1 °C; 74 °F | 12.2 °C; 54 °F | 378.0 mm 14.9 in |
Localities around Yantanabie:
| Wirrulla | Wirrulla; Wallala; Koolgera; Pureba | Gawler Ranges |
| Petina | Yantanabie | Gawler Ranges; Narlaby |
| Petina | Chilpenunda; Cungera; Kaldoonera | Kaldoonera |
- Footnotes: Locations; Adjoining localities

Yantanabie is a town and rural locality in the wheat belt of South Australia, 37 miles inland from Streaky Bay, South Australia.

== History ==
The town was proclaimed on 7 March 1918. The Yantanabie School opened in 1918 and closed in 1951.

By 1926, the township consisted of a school, a hall and two businesses. Messrs Jones and Penhale opened a general store in the town in 1919 that carried wheat, super, wool, and machinery and also offered insurance services and supervised the post office and telegraph business. Mrs M.R. Tynan had recently opened a general store and boarding house.

The Western Flinders Football Association comprised four teams, representing Yantanabie, Wirrulla, Poochera and Chandada.

Between 1916 and 1926, an average of 36,000 bags per year of wheat were delivered at the siding.

== See also ==
- Hundred of Walpuppie
