= Pureba, South Australia =

Pureba South Australia
- Coordinates: 31.956240°S 134.209670°E
- Population: 0 (SAL 2016)
- Established: 1999
- Postcode(s): 5680
- Time zone: ACST (UTC+9:30)
  - Summer (DST): ACST (UTC+10:30)
- Location: 528 km (328 mi) west of Adelaide; 52 km (32 mi) north-east of Ceduna; 90 km (56 mi) north of Streaky Bay
- LGA(s): District Council of Ceduna; District Council of Streaky Bay; Pastoral Unincorporated Area
- Region: Eyre Western
- County: Dufferin; Way
- State electorate(s): Flinders; Giles
- Federal division(s): Grey
Mean max temp	Mean min temp	Annual rainfall
23.5 °C; 74 °F	10.4 °C; 51 °F	294.6 mm 11.6 in
Suburbs around Pureba:
See Surrounding localities
- Footnotes: Locations; Adjoining localities

Pureba is a locality in the Australian state of South Australia located on the west coast of Eyre Peninsula and on land to the immediate north of the peninsula about 528 kilometres (328 miles) north-west of the state capital of Adelaide and about 52 kilometres (32 miles) north-east and 90 kilometres (56 miles) north respectively of the municipal seats of Ceduna and Streaky Bay.

Pureba's boundaries were created in January 1999 with its name ultimately derived from Pureba Hill, a hill located within its boundaries. Pureba’s boundaries were altered on 26 April 2013 “to ensure the whole of the Pureba Conservation Park is within the locality of the same name.”

The land use within Pureba is mainly concerned with the Pureba Conservation Park, although “approved mineral exploration and mining” is allowed under the National Parks and Wildlife Act 1972.

Pureba is located within the federal division of Grey, the state electoral district of Giles, the local government areas of the District Council of Ceduna and the District Council of Streaky Bay, and the state’s Pastoral Unincorporated Area.

== Surrounding localities ==
Pureba is surrounded by the following localities gazetted under the South Australian Geographical Names Act 1991:

- North: Yumbarra, Yellabinna
- Northeast: Kondoolka
- East: Kondoolka, Pinjarra Station, Yondoolka and Gawler Ranges (Note: The locality of Kondoolka appears twice in the list of adjoining localities for Pureba's eastern boundary because Yondoolka fully surrounds the locality of Pinjarra Station on all sides except on the boundary with Pureba.)
- Southeast: Gawler Ranges
- South: Maltee, Mudamuckla, Nunjikompita, Wallala, Koolgera, and Yantanabie
- Southwest: Wandana
- West: Wandana
- Northwest: Yumbarra
