= Poochera, South Australia =

Poochera South Australia
- Coordinates: 32°43′17″S 134°50′16″E
- Population: 67 (SAL 2021)
- Established: 23 September 1920 (town); 12 April 2001 (locality)
- Postcode(s): 5655
- Elevation: 82 m (269 ft)(railway station)
- Time zone: ACST (UTC+9:30)
  - Summer (DST): ACDT (UTC+10:30)
- Location: 425 km (264 mi) NW of Adelaide; 60 km (37 mi) NE of Streaky Bay
- LGA(s): District Council of Streaky Bay
- Region: Eyre Western
- County: Robinson
- State electorate(s): Flinders
- Federal division(s): Grey
Localities around Poochera:
Cungena	Kaldoonera	Bockelberg
Chandada	Poochera	Minnipa
Chandada	Chandada; Kalcultaby	Minnipa; Kalcultaby
- Footnotes: Locations; Adjoining localities

Poochera is a small grain belt town 60 km north-west of Streaky Bay on the Eyre Peninsula, South Australia.

The township of Poochera was not surveyed until 1920, and its name is thought to be taken from the name of King Poojeri, a local aboriginal who died in 1917. A nearby hill is also named Poochera, possibly stemming from the same origin.

The town had a school which opened in 1920, but closed its doors in 1976.

Poochera is the centrepoint of a large agricultural area, the town itself being a strategic grain exchange point for the region's farmers, who specialise in cereal crops and sheep.

The town is 53 km away from the Gawler Ranges, and is commonly used as a stop off by tourists, who have access to a hotel and caravan park.

Poochera is located on the narrow gauge Eyre Peninsula Railway line. Regular passenger trains ended in 1968.

Poochera, however, is probably best noted for its nearby colonies of dinosaur ant (Nothomyrmecia macrops), a rare, primitive species of ant that has attracted entomologists and evolutionary biologists from around the world.

Apart from the Poochera Hotel and Caravan Park, the town is served by a roadhouse where most general supplies can be purchased.

Poochera is located within the federal division of Grey, the state electoral district of Flinders and the local government area of the District Council of Streaky Bay.
