= Wirrulla, South Australia =

Wirrulla
- Town
- Interactive map of Wirrulla
- Coordinates: 32°24′21″S 134°31′57″E
- Country: Australia
- State: South Australia
- Region: Eyre Western
- LGA: District Council of Streaky Bay
- Location: 469 km (291 mi) NW of Adelaide; 53 km (33 mi) North East of Streaky Bay
- Established: 8 June 1916 (town); 12 April 2001 (locality)

Government
  - State electorate: Flinders
  - Federal division: Grey
- Elevation (railway station): 78 m (256 ft)

Population
  - Total: 104 (2016 census)
- Time zone: UTC+9:30 (ACST)
  - Summer (DST): UTC+10:30 (ACST)
- Postcode: 5661
- County: Dufferin
- Mean max temp: 23.1 °C (73.6 °F)
- Mean min temp: 12.2 °C (54.0 °F)
- Annual rainfall: 378.0 mm (14.88 in)
Localities around Wirrulla
Pimbaacla	Pimbaacla; Wallala	Wallala
Pimbaacla; Petina	Wirrulla	Wallala; Yantanabie
Petina	Petina; Yantanabie	Yantanabie
- Locations; Adjoining Localities

Wirrulla is a small grain belt town located 60 km from Streaky Bay on the Eyre Peninsula. The town is a focus point for many of the surrounding agricultural districts, and features a number of silos used to store grain from the surrounding areas. The name of the town is derived from an Aboriginal word meaning "to make haste, to be quick".

The 2016 Australian census which was conducted in August 2016 reports that Wirrulla had a population of 104 people.

The town was established after The Wirrilla Estate owned by Mr D.H. Power was subdivided in 1914, growing around a railway siding. It was, and continues to be a useful stop for travellers making their way to the Gawler Ranges, which lie 40 km to the North of the township.

Wirrulla currently has a number of basic facilities including a hotel, a caravan park and a general store. The town also has an unusual tourist attraction – an inland jetty, possibly one of the few in the world.

The town has a number of sporting and recreational facilities including bowls and golf courses.

The Wirrulla Australian rules football club joined the Western Eyre Football League in March 2021, after the Mid West Football League was wound up permanently.
