= Hundred of Cungena =

the Hundred of Cungena is a cadastral hundred of the County of Robinson in South Australia. The hundred is centered on the eponymous town of Cungena.
