= Nauo language =

Extinct Australian Aboriginal language

Nauo
- Nawu, Nhawu
- Native to: Australia
- Region: Eyre Peninsula, South Australia
- Ethnicity: Nauo people
- Extinct: 19th century
- Revival: 21st century
- Language family: Pama–Nyungan: Thura-Yura; Wirangu; Nauo
- Writing system: Latin

Language codes
- ISO 639-3: nwo
- Glottolog: nauo1235
- AIATSIS: L2
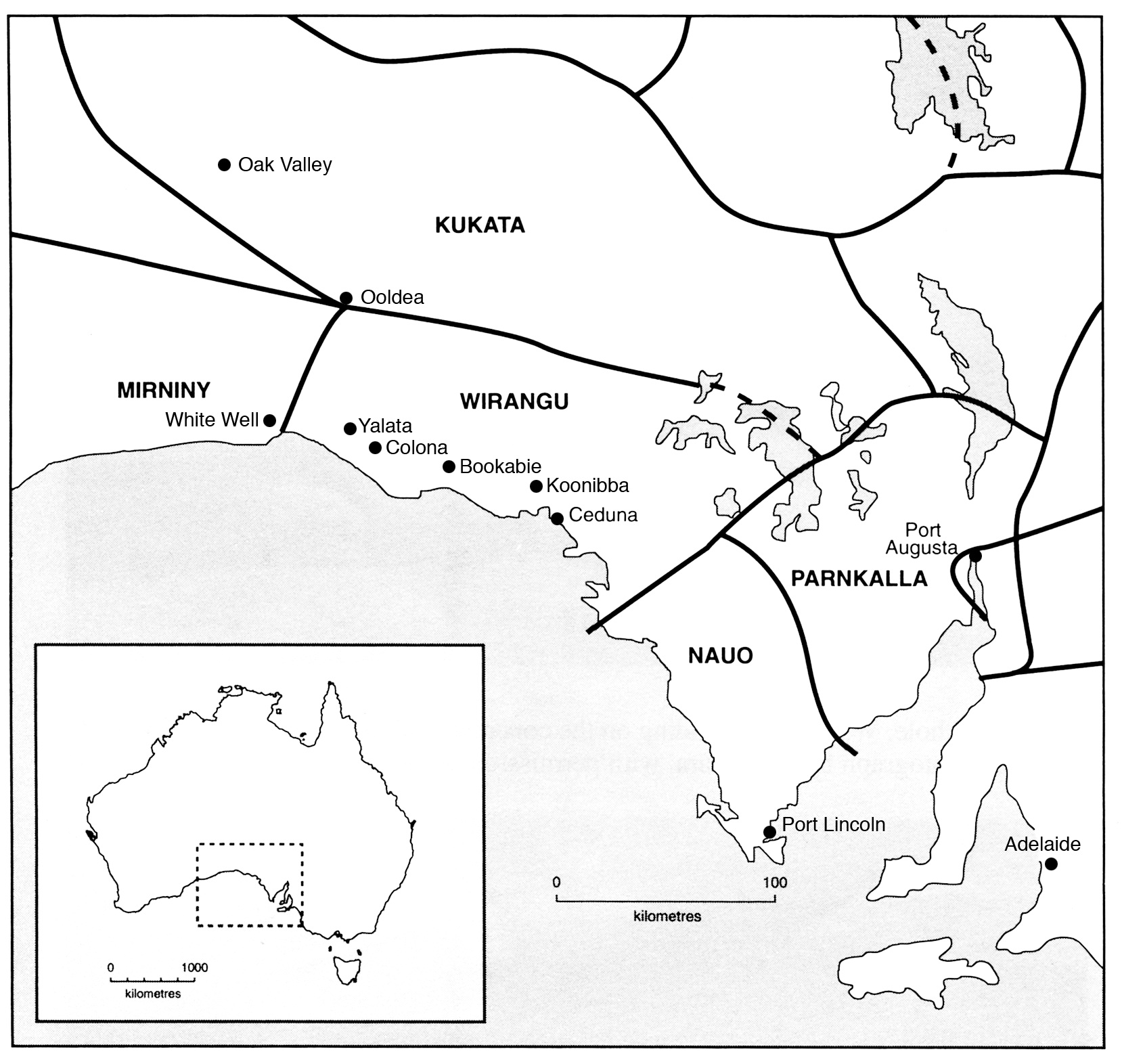
- Languages of South Australia.

Nauo, or Nawu, is an extinct, poorly-attested Pama-Nyungan language that was spoken by the Nauo people on the southern part of the Eyre Peninsula, South Australia.

Mobile Language Team at the University of Adelaide are reconstructing the language.

== Name ==
Other variant spellings have been recorded as Nhawu, Nawo, Njao, Gnowoo, Growoo, and variant names include Battara, Hilleri, Kadu, Kartwongulta, and Wiljaru.

== Classification ==
The Nauo language may have been related to the languages of its regional neighbours on the Eyre Peninsula, such as Barngarla or Wirangu. It has also been treated as a variant of the Wirangu language.

== Status ==
The language was deemed to be extinct by Norman Tindale, based on linguistic investigations done to determine Nauo's status in the 1930s. No speakers have been recorded since 1975.

=== Reconstruction and revival ===
Mobile Language Team (MLT) from the University of Adelaide has started work on the reconstruction of the language, based on the 10 words recorded by German missionary C. W. Schürmann, increasing the wordlist to 300 words. MLT is preparing a website for online learning site of the language.
