= Minnipa, South Australia =

Minnipa
- Town
- Interactive map of Minnipa
- Coordinates: 32°51′S 135°09′E
- Country: Australia
- State: South Australia
- LGA: Wudinna
- Location: 250 km (160 mi) from Port Lincoln
- Established: 1915

Government
  - State electorate: Flinders
  - Federal division: Grey

Population
  - Total: 177 (2016 census)
- Postcode: 5654
- Mean max temp: 24.7 °C (76.5 °F)
- Mean min temp: 11.2 °C (52.2 °F)
- Annual rainfall: 285.5 mm (11.24 in)

Minnipa is a small town serving the local grain growing community located on South Australia's Eyre Peninsula.

== History ==
The Nauo were the indigenous people of the area of Minnipa prior to English colonisation and the area around the town was first settled by Europeans in 1878. At the arrival of the railway line on 5 May 1913, the town consisted of two tents. Development of the surrounding districts followed the railway, and accelerated after the opening of the water pipeline from the Tod River scheme in 1925. By 1960, Minnipa was the major railway centre between Cummins and Thevenard. Before the construction of the Tod River scheme and its network of pipelines, tanks were constructed at many locations to catch the runoff from the granite outcrops which are a feature of the landscape. The earliest of these were constructed at Minnipa Hill in 1914 by the South Australian Railways. These historic tanks were reconditioned in the 1990s and fitted with new roofs to provide a standby water supply for Minnipa.

The town was proclaimed in 1915 and subsequently it became a typical wheatbelt town servicing the surrounding area and providing the necessary grain handling and rail facilities to allow farmers fast access to Thevenard and Port Lincoln. Within the town are a number of grain silos that serve to store the local wheat crop. Adjacent to the silos is a disused railway siding which used to freight the grain crop to Port Lincoln, which is now done by road transport for export around the world.

The town's rural life includes several churches, a general store, caravan park, pub, fodder store, vet clinic and other industry based companies. Its sporting tradition includes swimming, Australian Rules football, tennis, netball and table tennis.

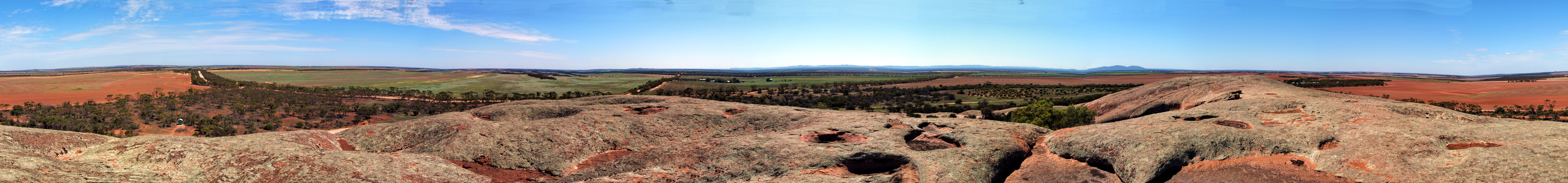
Panoramic view from Pildappa Rock within the locality of Minnipa showing the Gawler Ranges on the right

The town is close both to the west coast of Eyre Peninsula, and to the Gawler Ranges. It is located in the centre of a vast low-rainfall wheat belt and the surrounding countryside includes numerous wind-shaped granite outcrops.

The 'wave' shapes and varied colours of the granite outcrops or bornhardts in the area were formed by moisture-induced decomposition of the sub-surface granite when the ground level was much higher. Gradual erosion of the surface soil has left the granite outcrops exposed. Popular tourist destinations These granite outcrops were noted by Edward John Eyre, and a few years later the Government sponsored an expedition to map and record the native names of the outcrops, they were Tcharkulda, Yarwondutta, Minnipa, Chilpuddie and Pildappa. Fifteen km north of Minippa township is the standout Pildappa Rock whose incredible flowing forms rival the singular form of the better known Wave Rock in Western Australia.

== Climate ==
Minnipa has a semi-arid climate (Köppen: BSk/BSh), with hot, dry summers and mild, somewhat wet winters. Due to a change of weather station location and a closure of the old Minnipa station in 2002, this article uses the 1996-2024 normlals from the new station, while records cover both, considering there was only 700 metres (770 yd) between those.

Climate data for Minnipa (32º50'24"S, 135º09'00"E, 165 m AMSL) (1996-2024 normals, 1965-2024 extremes, sun 1977-2001)
| Month | Jan | Feb | Mar | Apr | May | Jun | Jul | Aug | Sep | Oct | Nov | Dec | Year |
|---|---|---|---|---|---|---|---|---|---|---|---|---|---|
| Record high °C (°F) | 48.0 (118.4) | 46.0 (114.8) | 44.4 (111.9) | 40.0 (104.0) | 31.2 (88.2) | 26.5 (79.7) | 30.0 (86.0) | 32.3 (90.1) | 36.6 (97.9) | 40.8 (105.4) | 45.4 (113.7) | 47.2 (117.0) | 48.0 (118.4) |
| Mean daily maximum °C (°F) | 32.9 (91.2) | 32.2 (90.0) | 28.9 (84.0) | 24.9 (76.8) | 20.2 (68.4) | 16.7 (62.1) | 16.3 (61.3) | 17.8 (64.0) | 21.8 (71.2) | 25.3 (77.5) | 28.5 (83.3) | 30.6 (87.1) | 24.7 (76.5) |
| Mean daily minimum °C (°F) | 16.0 (60.8) | 15.9 (60.6) | 14.3 (57.7) | 12.0 (53.6) | 9.7 (49.5) | 7.4 (45.3) | 6.7 (44.1) | 6.8 (44.2) | 8.3 (46.9) | 10.3 (50.5) | 12.5 (54.5) | 14.3 (57.7) | 11.2 (52.2) |
| Record low °C (°F) | 5.8 (42.4) | 6.9 (44.4) | 5.3 (41.5) | 4.5 (40.1) | 2.2 (36.0) | −1.2 (29.8) | 0.1 (32.2) | −0.3 (31.5) | 0.1 (32.2) | 1.4 (34.5) | 2.1 (35.8) | 5.3 (41.5) | −1.2 (29.8) |
| Average precipitation mm (inches) | 13.5 (0.53) | 15.0 (0.59) | 17.5 (0.69) | 15.6 (0.61) | 27.6 (1.09) | 36.5 (1.44) | 34.0 (1.34) | 38.1 (1.50) | 27.0 (1.06) | 22.6 (0.89) | 20.9 (0.82) | 20.7 (0.81) | 289.8 (11.41) |
| Average precipitation days (≥ 1.0 mm) | 2.3 | 1.8 | 2.2 | 2.7 | 5.1 | 7.3 | 7.3 | 7.5 | 5.1 | 4.0 | 3.0 | 2.8 | 51.1 |
| Average afternoon relative humidity (%) | 25 | 27 | 31 | 35 | 46 | 54 | 56 | 51 | 43 | 32 | 28 | 28 | 38 |
| Average dew point °C (°F) | 6.2 (43.2) | 7.4 (45.3) | 6.0 (42.8) | 5.6 (42.1) | 6.3 (43.3) | 5.9 (42.6) | 5.8 (42.4) | 5.1 (41.2) | 5.0 (41.0) | 3.2 (37.8) | 4.0 (39.2) | 5.2 (41.4) | 5.5 (41.9) |
| Mean monthly sunshine hours | 322.4 | 271.2 | 266.6 | 225.0 | 179.8 | 168.0 | 182.9 | 207.7 | 225.0 | 266.6 | 276.0 | 291.4 | 2,882.6 |
| Percentage possible sunshine | 74 | 72 | 70 | 67 | 56 | 56 | 58 | 61 | 63 | 67 | 67 | 66 | 65 |
Source: Bureau of Meteorology (1996-2024 normals, 1965-2024 extremes, sun 1977-2001)

== Heritage listings ==
Minnipa has a number of heritage-listed sites, including:

- Pildappa Road: Pildappa Rock
- Yardea Road: Yarwondutta Rock and Quarry
- Yardea Road: Yarwondutta Rock Tank
