= Wirangu language =

Australian Aboriginal language

Wirangu
- Native to: Australia
- Region: West coast of South Australia
- Ethnicity: Wirangu people
- Native speakers: 2 semi-speakers (2007)
- Revival: 2004
- Language family: Pama–Nyungan: Thura-Yura; (Nangga); Wirangu

Language codes
- ISO 639-3: wgu
- Glottolog: wira1265
- AIATSIS: C1
- ELP: Wirangu
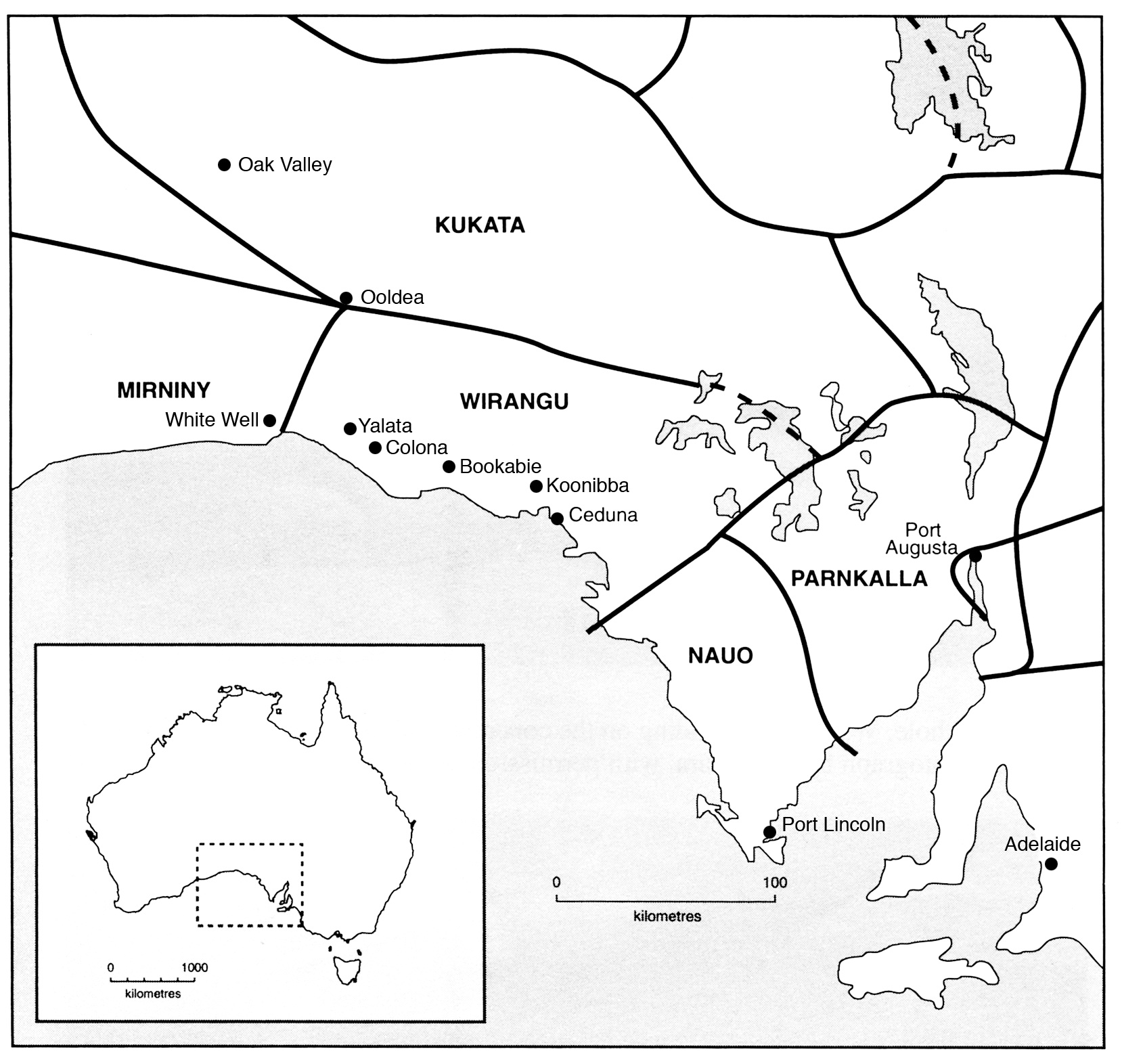
- Tribal boundaries, after Tindale (1974), adapted from Hercus (1999)

The Wirangu language, also written Wirrongu, Wirrung, Wirrunga, and Wirangga, and also known by other exonyms, is a moribund Australian Aboriginal language traditionally spoken by the Wirangu people, living on the west coast of South Australia across a region encompassing modern Ceduna and Streaky Bay, stretching west approximately to the head of the Great Australian Bight and east to Lake Gairdner. It is a language of the Thura-Yura group, and some older sources placed it in a subgroup called Nangga.

== Classification and influences ==
The Wirangu language is most closely related to the Thura–Yura group of Australian Aboriginal languages, which are spoken from the West Coast to the Adelaide area and north to the Flinders Ranges and Lake Eyre. The best-known relatives of Wirangu are Barngarla, Nauo, Nukunu, Adnyamathanha, Narangga and Kaurna.

Because of the intensive culture contacts in the southern half of South Australia, which brought dislocation and culture change, traditional lifestyles and traditional ways of speaking declined during the nineteenth and twentieth centuries. In the case of Wirangu, the establishment of the Koonibba Mission in 1898 brought intense contact with other languages, in particular Kokatha. Like most Aboriginal Australian languages, the two languages share a common ancestor in the Pama–Nyungan group, but while Wirangu is a Thura-Yura language, Kokatha is defined as a Wati language. Neighbouring languages often borrow words from one another, and the new intense contacts at Koonibba led to a significant influx of Kokatha words which have become part of present-day Wirangu.

== Revitalisation ==
Although there are very few fully fluent Wirangu speakers left, many Aboriginal people in the Ceduna area remember parts of the language.

A Wirangu language revitalisation program has been underway at Ceduna and surrounding areas since 2004. This has involved the recording of Wirangu language from the last two recognised full speakers of the language, Gladys and Doreen Miller. With the assistance of linguists from the University of Adelaide a number of printed and digital books have been produced for use in schools and in the wider community.

In 2005 the Far West Languages Centre was established in Ceduna. The centre supports and promotes the use of the Wirangu language as well as other extremely endangered local languages, such as Gugada/Kokatha and Mirning.

== Phonology ==
=== Vowels ===
Wirangu has three phonemic vowels (a, i, u). Vowel length is not usually considered phonemic in Wirangu, as vowel length is normally short, although it is predictably long in all monosyllabic words (Wirangu ma [ma:], wa [wa:], mil [mi:l], etc.), borrowings from other languages (maatha [ma:t̪a] < English "master"), and cases of initial consonant loss across phonological boundaries (marna + (k)artu = marnaartu [maɳa:ʈu]).

	Front	Back
High	i	u
Low	a	

=== Consonants ===
The consonantal phonemic inventory of Wirangu is very similar to that of many other Pama Nyungan languages, with six series of stops and nasals. Voicing is not phonemic in the Wirangu stop series, and many stops are either unvoiced or semivoiced. Wirangu also has two rhotics, an alveolar flap/trill and a more retroflex rhotic.

	Peripheral		Laminal		Apical	
	Labial	Velar	Dental	Palatal	Alveolar	Retroflex
Stop	p	k	t̪	c	t	ʈ
Nasal	m	ŋ	n̪	ɲ	n	ɳ
Lateral			l̪	ʎ	l	ɭ
Flap or Trill					r	
Approximant	w		j			ɻ
