= Nauo people =

Aboriginal Australian people

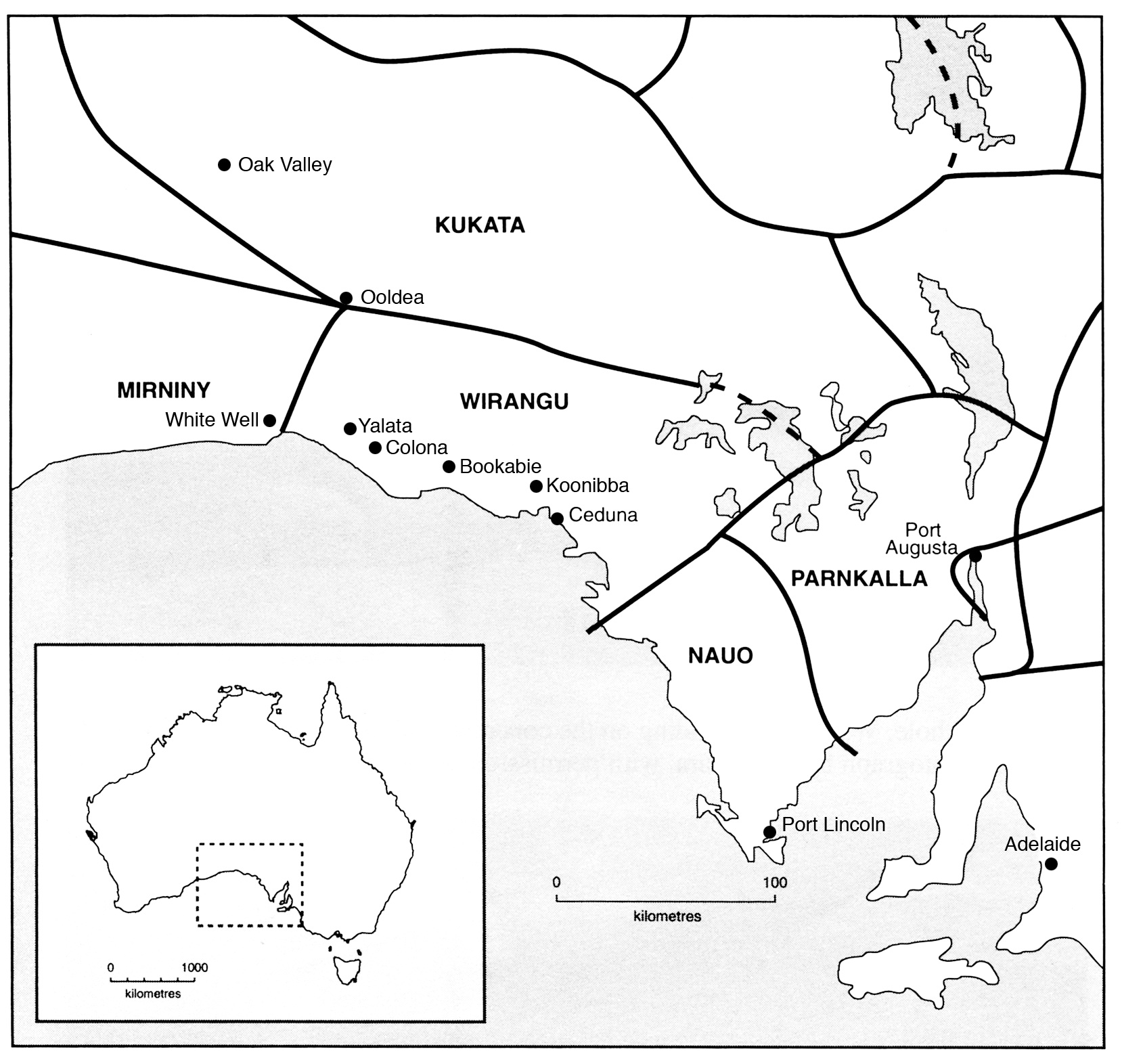
Aboriginal languages of South Australia. (Note: Tribal boundaries, after Tindale (1974), adapted from Hercus (1999).)

The Nauo people, also spelt Nawu and Nhawu, are an Aboriginal Australian people of the south-western Eyre Peninsula in South Australia. The Nauo language became extinct by the twentieth century, but efforts are being made to revive it.

== Country ==
Before the official British colonisation of South Australia in 1836, the Nauo people fell victim to raids by whalers and sealers who worked the southern coast of the continent, and European settlement on the Eyre Peninsula encroached on the land of the Indigenous peoples. By the time that anthropologist Norman Tindale was documenting the territories of the various people in the 1930s, he was not able to find any Nauo people, so obtained his information mainly from Wirangu and Barngarla people.

According to Tindale, the traditional lands of the Nauo people were on the Eyre peninsula, with their principal centres around the scrub gum forest areas of the south-western coast. Their combined territory covered approximately 21,000 square kilometres (8,000 sq mi), with the western frontiers around Cape Radstock, northwards to beyond Minnipa. Their eastern extension ran close to Darke Peak, and took in the areas west of Cleve and halfway between Carrow and Franklin Harbor. Port Lincoln, Mount Hope, Coffin Bay, and Elliston were all part of Nauo territory.

== History of contact ==
It is thought that, before the advent of white colonisation, the Nauo had a more northern boundary extension from the Gawler Ranges to Port Augusta. They were pressed to move further south by the time white settlement began, as the Barngarla's relocation brought pressure to bear on them from the north. At the same time, devastation came in from the south with the establishment of sealing stations along their southern coastal frontiers, whose men, together with escapees from Tasmanian prisons, kidnapped many Nauo women, beginning with raids from their bases on Kangaroo Island in the first decades of the 19th century. (Note: The lawless white men of presettlement days on Kangaroo Island (Tindale, 1937) raided them in the early 1800s. At least one Nauo woman survived on that island for many years. She was seen in company of a white sealer, along with Tasmanian women, at King George Sound and sketched in 1820 (Louis C. D. de Freycinet, 1829-1834). After colonisation in 1836, there was trouble and several settlers were killed in the Port Lincoln area. At the Green Patch homestead there are still preserved heavy hand-thrown solid barbed spears obtained after one such attack. (Tindale 1974, p. 136)) The violence of these early encounters may explain the hostility of the Nauo to later settlers. The Waterloo Bay Massacre, near Elliston, which is said to have taken place around 1846, is still a contentious historical issue. Tindale summarised the rumour as follows:

Following the killing of a shepherd named Hamp, and the wife of another immediately afterward, it is claimed that 160 well-armed men drove a large group of aborigines, said to have numbered 260, over a cliff into the sea. According to this entirely unconfirmed report, only two aborigines survived.

Whatever the truth, some Nauo were still in that area years afterwards.

As late as 2017, agreement between the successor Wirangu community and the Elliston municipal council on the terms to be used to describe what happened were still stalled, with representatives of the latter stating that "massacre" was too strong a word to describe what has been traditionally called the "Elliston incident", where "something happened" but the details are unknown.

In May 2018, a group of seven Nauo elders, along with two local anthropologists, presented a talk on the Aboriginal history of the Coffin Bay area at the Coffin Bay Yacht Club. Elder Jody Miller thought it was possibly the first time in South Australia that a Native Title claim group had been asked by a local non-Indigenous community to share their culture and songlines.

== Language ==
The Nauo language is extinct; there have been no recorded speakers since before 1975. It had some similarities with the Wirangu language.

The Mobile Language Team (MLT) from the University of Adelaide has started work on the reconstruction of the language, based on the 10 words recorded by German missionary C.W. Schürmann, increasing the wordlist to 300 words. MLT is preparing a website for online learning site of the language.

== Mythology ==
According to Nauo beliefs, the spirits of the departed are thought to dwell on the islands in Spencer Gulf.

George French Angas wrote in 1847 the following legend:

They affirm that the Nauo tribe was once entirely cut off by a great and powerful warrior, styled Willoo (eaglehawk). This formidable individual attempted to possess himself of all the women, and destroyed every man except two, who escaped by climbing into thick trees. Their names were, Karkantya and Poona (two smaller species of hawk). Willoo climbed after them, but they broke off the branch upon which he sat, and he fell to the ground; that instant a dog deprived him of his virility, when he immediately died, and was transformed into an eagle-hawk. A small lizard is supposed to be the originator of the sexes. The men distinguish it by the name of ibirri, the women call it waka: the men destroy the male lizards, and the women the females.

== Alternative names ==
- Battara (bat:ara meaning a variety of scrubby gum)
- Gnowoo
- Hilleri
- Kadu (the term meant "man")
- Kartawongulta (language name)
- Ngao (late (1939) Barngarla exonym)
- Njau, Njao, Nawo, Naua, Nowo
- Wiljaru (Barngarla exonym meaning "westerners")
- Willuro

== Sources ==
- "Aboriginal South Australia". Government of South Australia. Archived from the original on 1 May 2013.
- "AIATSIS map of Indigenous Australia". AIATSIS.
- Angas, George French (1847). Savage life and scenes in Australia and New Zealand (PDF). Vol. 1. Smith, Elder and Co.
- Gage, Nicola (21 July 2017). "Waterloo Bay 'massacre' debate rages as Aboriginal community looks for 'closure'" (PDF). ABC News.
- Howitt, Alfred William (1904). The native tribes of south-east Australia (PDF). Macmillan.
- Schürmann, Clamor Wilhelm (1879). "The Aboriginal Tribes of Port Lincoln" (PDF). In Woods, James Dominick (ed.). The Native Tribes of South Australia. Adelaide: E.S. Wigg & Son. pp. 207–252.
- Tindale, Norman Barnett (1937). "Tasmanian aborigines on Kangaroo Island". Records of the South Australian Museum. 6 (1): 29–37.
- Tindale, Norman Barnett (1974). "Nauo (SA)". Aboriginal Tribes of Australia: Their Terrain, Environmental Controls, Distribution, Limits, and Proper Names. Australian National University Press. ISBN 978-0-708-10741-6. Archived from the original on 12 April 2021.
- Wilhelmi, Charles (1860). "Manners and customs of the Australian natives, in particular of the Port Lincoln district". Transactions of the Royal Society of Victoria. 5: 164–203. ISBN 978-0-708-10741-6.
