= Wirangu people =

Aboriginal Australian people of South Australia

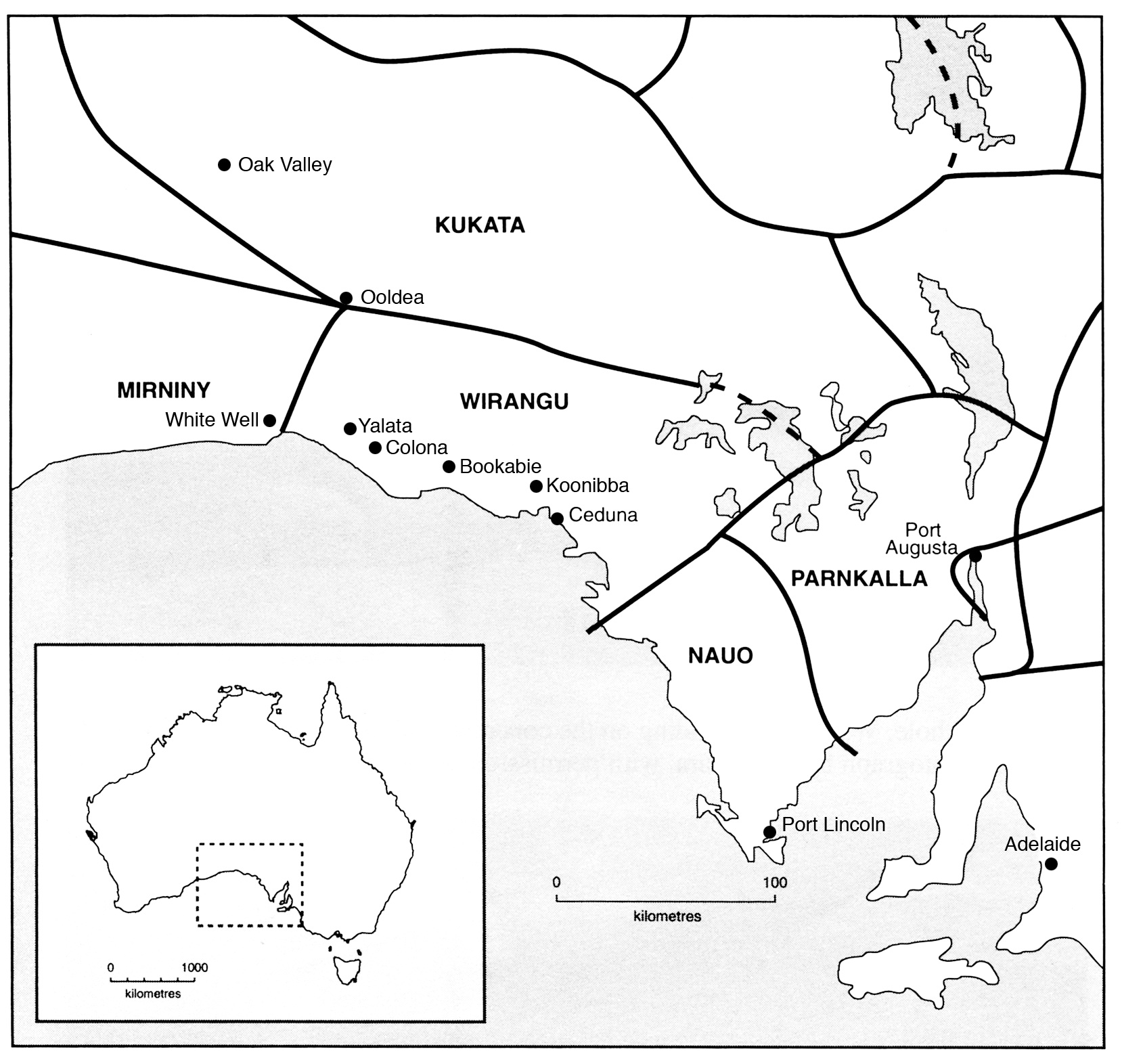
Aboriginal languages of South Australia. (Note: Tribal boundaries, after Tindale (1974), adapted from Hercus (1999).)

The Wirangu are an Aboriginal Australian people of the Western coastal region of South Australia.

== Name ==
Daisy Bates stated that the Wirangu ethnonym was composed of two words: wira (cloud) and wonga (speech).

== Language ==
Wirangu is usually classified as genetically related to the Thura-Yura language family. Early ethnographers, such as R. H. Mathews stated that the Barngarla, Nauo and Wirangu peoples were "practically the same people in language and customs".

== Country ==
In Norman Tindale's estimation, the Wirangu were assigned an original tribal land extending over 21,500 square miles (56,000 km^{2}), embracing the coastal area between Head of Bight, Cape Blanche and Streaky Bay, with an inland extension running north to places like Ooldea, Kokatha, and Kondoolka.

== Mythology ==
In ancestral times a large mother snake travelled down from the west to Juldi'kapi. From there it was followed by two men (the Wati Kutjara) (Note: two ancestral heroes, the Wati Kutjara (wati, man; kutjara, two)) who wished to kill it. They chased the snake south-east to Pedinga water-hole (Pedinga'kapi, thirty-five miles south-east of the Ooldea Soak). This granite water-hole was the snake's camp. The natural basin-shaped depressions in the rock, averaging three feet in diameter, are said to be the nests of snakes. Here the Wati Kutjara speared the snake, wounding it severely. They left it thus, thinking that it would soon die, and returned to the west. The snake, however, managed to crawl on a little distance (about two miles) to the south to an ochre pan, named Mul'tan'tu. Here she rested, leaving the red, yellow and white ochre deposits found there. The red ochre symbolizes the blood shed by the snake, the white ochre the excreta; while the yellow ochre is the urine. The snake left this clay-pan and continued on to the north-east and then westwards to her camp.

== History of contact ==
Already on the eve of contact with whites, the Wirangu were being pressured out of part of their traditional territory by the movements of the Kokata.

== Alternative names ==
- Hilleri (Barngarla Kuyani exonym)
- Jilbara (Kokata exonym, meaning "southerners")
- Naljara (Kokata exonym)
- Ngoleiadjara (Yankuntjatjarra exonym)
- Nonga (denoting "man")
- Tidni, Tidnie, Titnie. (Barngarla Kuyani exonym)
- Wanbiri (Kokata exonym, meaning (people of the) "sea coast")
- Wangon (language name, bearing pejorative sense of "shit" (kona))
- Willeuroo (Barngarla exonym, wilyaru meaning "west")
- Windakan (term used also to denote the Ngalia language)
- Wirrongu
- Wirrung
- Wirrunga, Wirangga
- Yilrea (variant of Hilleri)

Source: Tindale 1974, p. 219

== Sources ==
- "Aboriginal South Australia". Government of South Australia. Archived from the original on 1 May 2013.
- "AIATSIS map of Indigenous Australia". AIATSIS. 28 July 2023.
- Bates, Daisy (1918). "Aborigines of the West Coast of South Australia". Transactions of the Royal Society of South Australia. 42: 152–167.
- Berndt, Ronald M. (September 1941). "Tribal Migrations and Myths Centring on Ooldea, South Australia". Oceania. 12 (1): 1–20. doi:10.1002/j.1834-4461.1941.tb00343.x. JSTOR 40327930.
- Hercus, L. A. (1999). A grammar of the Wirangu language from the West Coast of South Australia. Pacific Linguistics. ISBN 978-0-858-83505-4.
- Howitt, Alfred William (1904). The native tribes of south-east Australia (PDF). Macmillan.
- Mathews, R. H. (January 1900). "Divisions of the South Australian Aborigines". Proceedings of the American Philosophical Society. 39 (161): 78–91+93. JSTOR 983545.
- Monaghan, Paul (March 2012). "Going for Wombat — Transformations in Wirangu and the Scotdesco Community on the Far West Coast of South Australia". Oceania. 82 (1): 45–61. doi:10.1002/j.1834-4461.2012.tb00118.x. JSTOR 23209616.
- Taplin, George (1879). Folklore, manners, customs and languages of the South Australian aborigines (PDF). Adelaide: E Spiller, Acting Government Printer.
- Tindale, Norman Barnett (1974). "Wirangu (SA)". Aboriginal Tribes of Australia: Their Terrain, Environmental Controls, Distribution, Limits, and Proper Names. Australian National University Press. ISBN 978-0-708-10741-6.
