= 1942 SANFL Grand Final =

- Official program cover.

Port–Torrens	West–Glenelg
18.12 (120)	16.13 (109)
	1	2	3	4
PWT	7.2 (44)	10.6 (66)	12.12 (84)	18.12 (120)
WG	2.7 (19)	9.9 (63)	15.9 (99)	16.3 (109)
- Date: Saturday, 19 September (2:10 pm)
- Stadium: Adelaide Oval
- Attendance: 35,000
- Umpires: E.J. Hine

The 1942 SANFL Grand Final was an Australian rules football game contested between a merger teams of Port Adelaide–West Torrens ("Port–Torrens") and West Adelaide–Glenelg ("West–Glenelg"), held at the Adelaide Oval on Saturday 19 September 1942. It was the 44th annual Grand Final of the South Australian National Football League, stated to determine the premiers of the 1942 SANFL season. The match, attended by 35,000 spectators, was won by Port–Torrens by a margin of 11 points, marking that mergers first premiership.

== Background ==
Due to logistics and a lack of resources the SANFL decided, starting in 1942, that the league would reduce from eight teams to four with geographical mergers between the neighbouring clubs the preferable configuration of the competition during World War II. The main justification for holding the competition during this period was to raise money for patriotic and charitable funds along with providing entertainment for troops stationed in Adelaide.

Before the game a curtain raiser match was played between an RAAF station and an anti-aircraft station of the AIF.

== Teams ==
Port-Torrens	West–Glenelg

Port–Torrens
B:	3. Louis Martyn	17. Ken Obst	Christopher Johnstone
HB:	Leslie McLean	2. Jack Thiele	6. Bill McFarlane
C:	14. Max Nicholls	1. Lew Roberts (c)	Stuart Glastonbury
HF:	Clarence Dayman	9. Ivor Dangerfield	8. Arthur Franklin
F:	Gordon Scott	Thomas Kellaway	7. Merv Shaw
Foll:	5. Bob McLean	4. Allan Reval	John Skelley
Int:	William Tonkin		
Coach:	Sampson Hosking		

West–Glenelg
B:	Richard Corbett	Merv Waite	Richard Codd
HB:	Ron Keane	Harry Powell	Ray McArthur
C:	Simons	Jack Broadstock	Gillespie
HF:	Allan Crabbe	Keith Miller	Ted Robjent
F:	Summersides	Mel Brock	Ned Hender
Foll:	Smith	Taylor	Jim Coad
Int:	Burt		

== Scorecard ==
Grand final
Saturday, 19 September	Port–Torrens	def.	West–Glenelg	Adelaide Oval (crowd: 35,000)
7.2 (44); 10.6 (66); 12.12 (84); 18.12 (120)	Q1; Q2; Q3; Final	2.7 (19); 9.9 (63); 15.9 (99); 16.13 (109)	Umpires: E.J. Hine
McLean – 6 Skelley — 4 Kelleway – 3 Shaw – 2 Scott, Hayman, Dangerfield – 1	Goals	4 – Coad; 3 – Brock; 2 – Miller, Hender, Smith; 1 — Robjent, Summersides, Taylor
Injuries	Brock (leg)
