= City vs Country Patriotic Match =

1940 SANFL Patriotic All-Stars
Country Team	Metropolitan Team
17.23 (125)	23.14 (152)
	1	2	3	4
Country	5.6 (36)	6.11 (47)	15.16 (106)	17.23 (125)
City	4.5 (29)	13.8 (86)	20.8 (128)	23.14 (152)
- Date: 3 August 1940
- Stadium: Adelaide Oval
- Attendance: 5,592
- Umpires: Stan Jacquier

The City v Country Patriotic Match was a one-off all-star game between two representative sides organised by the South Australian National Football League, following the cancellation of an interstate match between South Australia and Victoria in 1940. Admission to the ground was set at ninepence and 1 6 to the grandstand, children threepence and sixpence, with profits donated to the Navy League of Australia.

The match was played on 3 August 1940 at Adelaide Oval, between the Country Team (Country) and the Metropolitan Team (City). City won the match by 27 points.

== Teams ==
The teams were selected from SANFL footballers by the State football selectors; C. McArthur, T.R.L. Alderman, and Sergeant C.L Shea of the 2nd A.I.F.

=== Country Team ===
Colours: Red and Black

No.	Name	SANFL club
1	Jack Dawes (c)	South Adelaide
3	Angus Strauss	West Torrens
4	Vernon Richter	Glenelg
6	Hartley Bagshaw	Sturt
7	Lew Roberts	Port Adelaide
8	Lawrence Rusby	South Adelaide
11	Lyndsay Reynolds	West Adelaide
12	Andrew Brown	Port Adelaide
14	Ivan Dangerfield	West Adelaide
16	Richard Halliday	Glenelg
17	Claude Greening	Port Adelaide
18	Harold Huxtable	Norwood
20	Jim Hogan	North Adelaide
21	Reginald Schumann	Port Adelaide
22	Bruce Schultz	Norwood
23	Jack Oatey	Norwood
24	John Boyle	South Adelaide
	Theo Chynoweth	West Adelaide
	Ken Obst	Port Adelaide

Colin Smith (West Adelaide) was initially selected as Vice Captain but dropped out of the team on the day of the match, along with J. Reilly (North Adelaide) and Jack Furniss (North Adelaide), who were replaced with Jack Oatey, Angus Strauss and Theo Chynoweth.

=== Metropolitan Team ===
Colours: Blue and White

No.	Name	SANFL club
1	Bob Quinn (c)	Port Adelaide
2	Tom Warhurst Sr. (vc)	Norwood
3	Patrick Connolly	Norwood
5	Max Lowe	Sturt
6	James Templeton	South Adelaide
7	Jack Skelley	Port Adelaide
8	Colin Aamodt	North Adelaide
11	Ken Farmer	North Adelaide
12	Robert Thatcher	West Adelaide
14	Stan Cox	West Torrens
15	Arthur Lance	Sturt
16	Ralph Green	Sturt
18	Bob McLean	Port Adelaide
19	Maxwell Carmichael	Port Adelaide
20	Allan Reval	Port Adelaide
21	Donald Budarick	West Adelaide
24	Marcus Boyall	Glenelg
25	Mel Brock	Glenelg
26	Horace Blight	West Torrens

Lionel Bennetts (North Adelaide) dropped out of the originally selected team, to be replaced by Mel Brock (Glenelg)

== Best on ground award ==
Whilst there was no official award presented for the player judged best afield, Jack Oatey's performance was singled out in multiple accounts as the best performed player in the game.

== Scorecard ==
City v Country Patriotic Match for Navy
Saturday, 3 August 1940	Metropolitan Team	def.	Country Team	Adelaide Oval (crowd: 5,592)	Report
4.5 (29); 13.8 (86); 20.8 (128); 23.14 (152)	Q1; Q2; Q3; Final	5.6 (36); 6.11 (47); 15.16 (106); 17.23 (125)	Umpires: Stan Jacquier
Farmer 8 Quinn 5 McLean, Blight 4 Brock, Thatcher 1	Goals	Schultz 7 Halliday 5 Dangerfield 2 Rusby, Dawes, Oatey 1
Quinn, Cox, McLean, Boyall, Brock	Best	Oatey, Dangerfield, Halliday, Schumann, Reynolds, Schultz, Bagshaw
Warhurst	Injuries

== See also ==
- 1940 SANFL season
