= Gawler Central Football Club =

Sporting Club

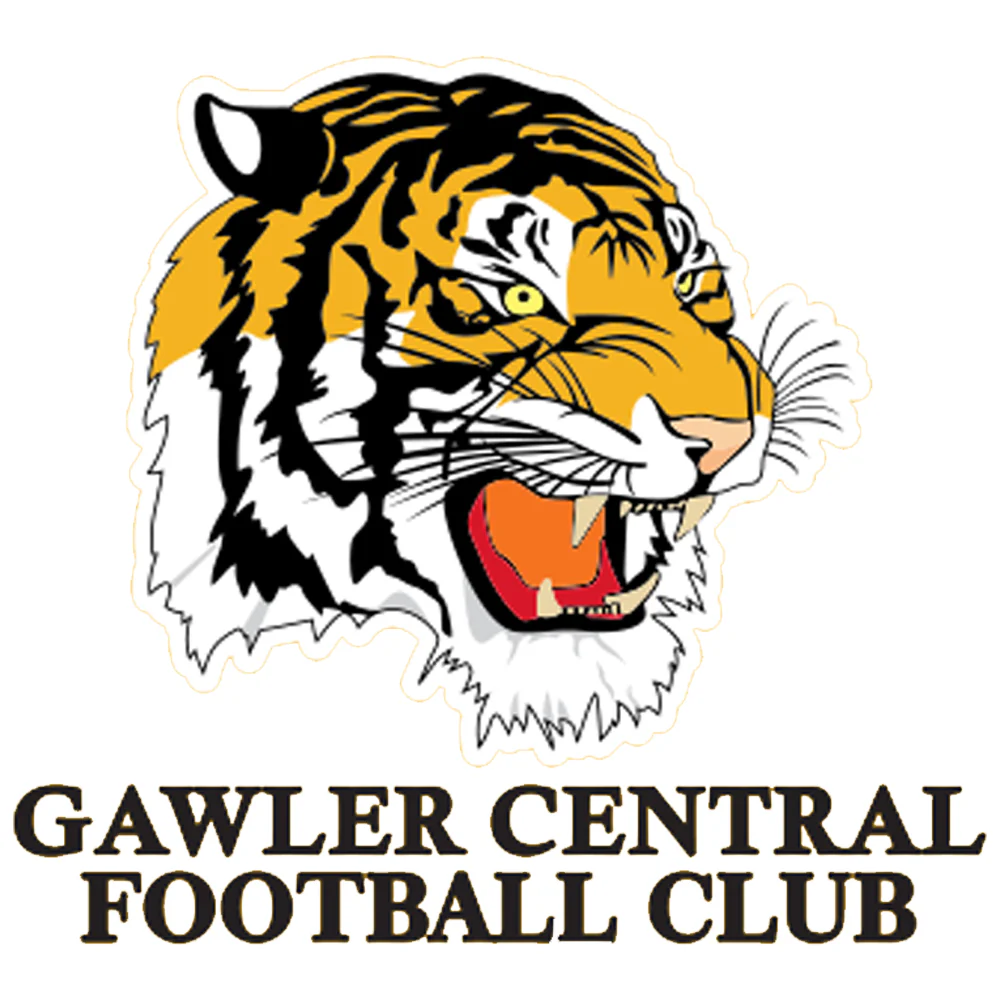

Names
- Nickname: Tigers

Club details
- Founded: 1889
- Colours: Yellow & Black
- Competition: Barossa Light & Gawler Football Association
- President: Simon Argent
- Coach: Brendan Dew
- Captain: Ryan Williams
- Ground: Gawler Oval
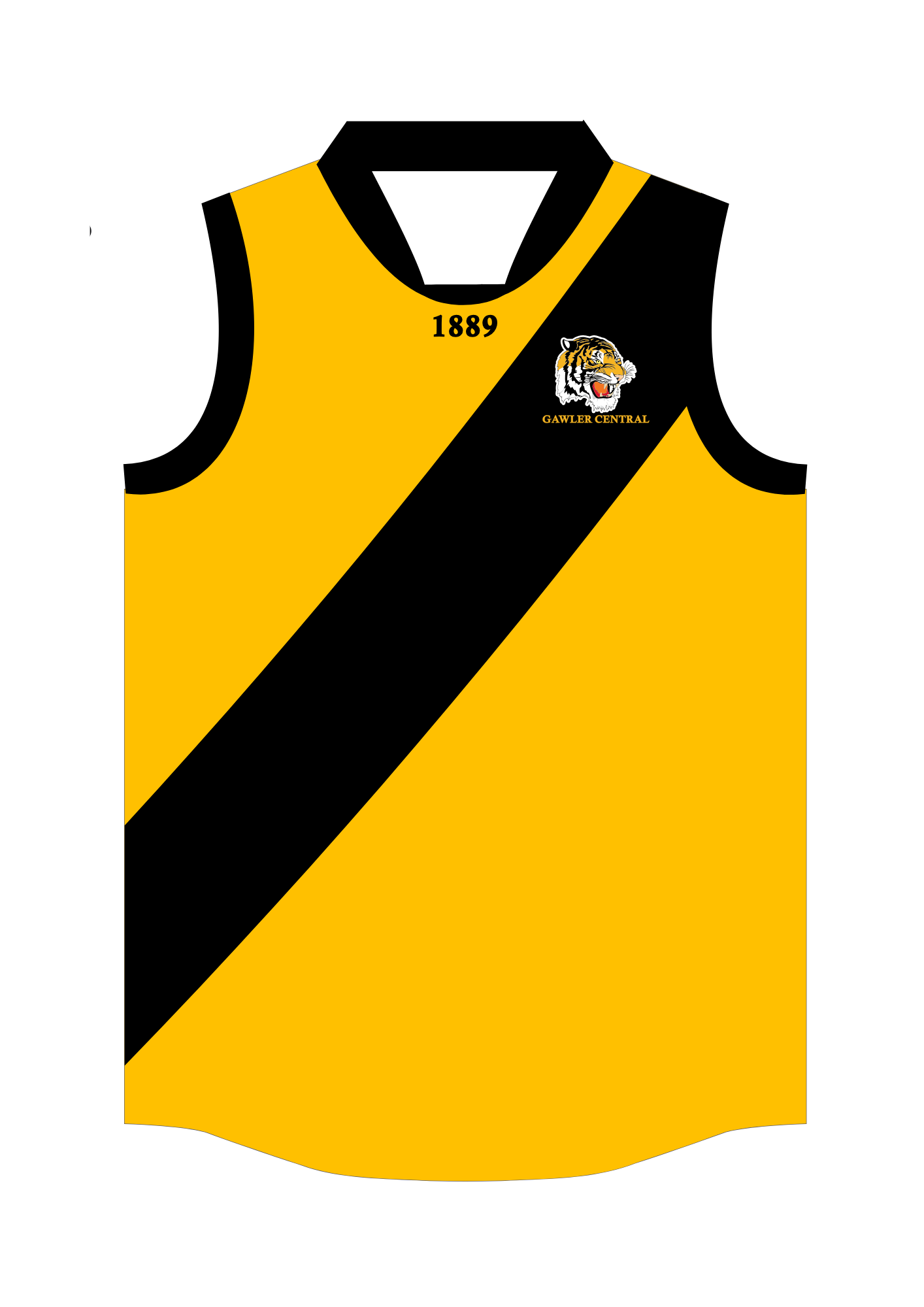
- Guernsey: GCFC Club Top

Gawler Central Football Club, nicknamed the Tigers, is an Australian rules football club based in Gawler. Founded in 1889, the club competes in the Barossa, Light & Gawler Football Association... (BLGFA) and is one of the oldest operating football clubs in regional South Australia.

== History ==
=== Origins ===
Australian Rules football has been played in the township since 1867. The original Gawler Football Club was formed in 1868 and was the first formal football team in the township. The Gawler Football Club regularly played social, invitation and challenge matches against clubs from Adelaide and surrounding districts, at a time when football had yet to develop into a formal league or association structure.

In April 1887, the newly amalgamated Gawler Albion Football Club was formally admitted to the South Australian Football Association (SAFA).

=== Gawler Junior Football Association ===
On 8 March 1889, the Gawler Football Club held a meeting to establish the Gawler Junior Football Association, with the proposed competition based around the formation of local teams representing South Gawler, Gawler and Willaston.

The purpose of the Gawler Junior Association was to develop players who could be recruited into the senior Gawler Football Club. The term “junior” did not refer to the age of the players, but distinguished the local competition as a lower level of football beneath the senior association competition in which the Gawler Football Club competed.

The Gawler Junior Football Association was formed on Tuesday 23 April 1889 by delegates from the following three clubs Gawler South, Gawler Central and Willaston.

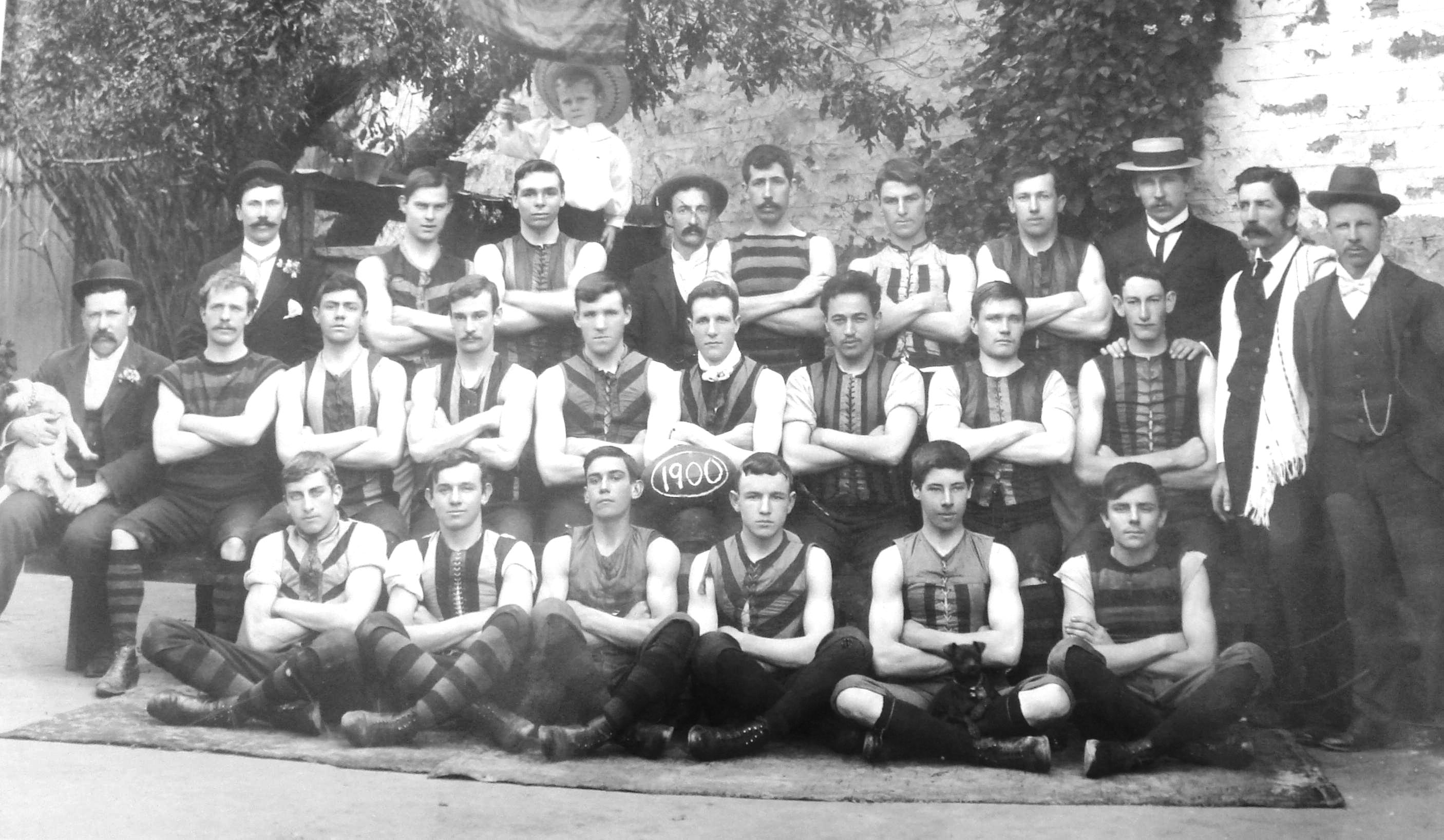
GCFC 1900 Team Picture

=== Formation - Gawler Central Football Club ===
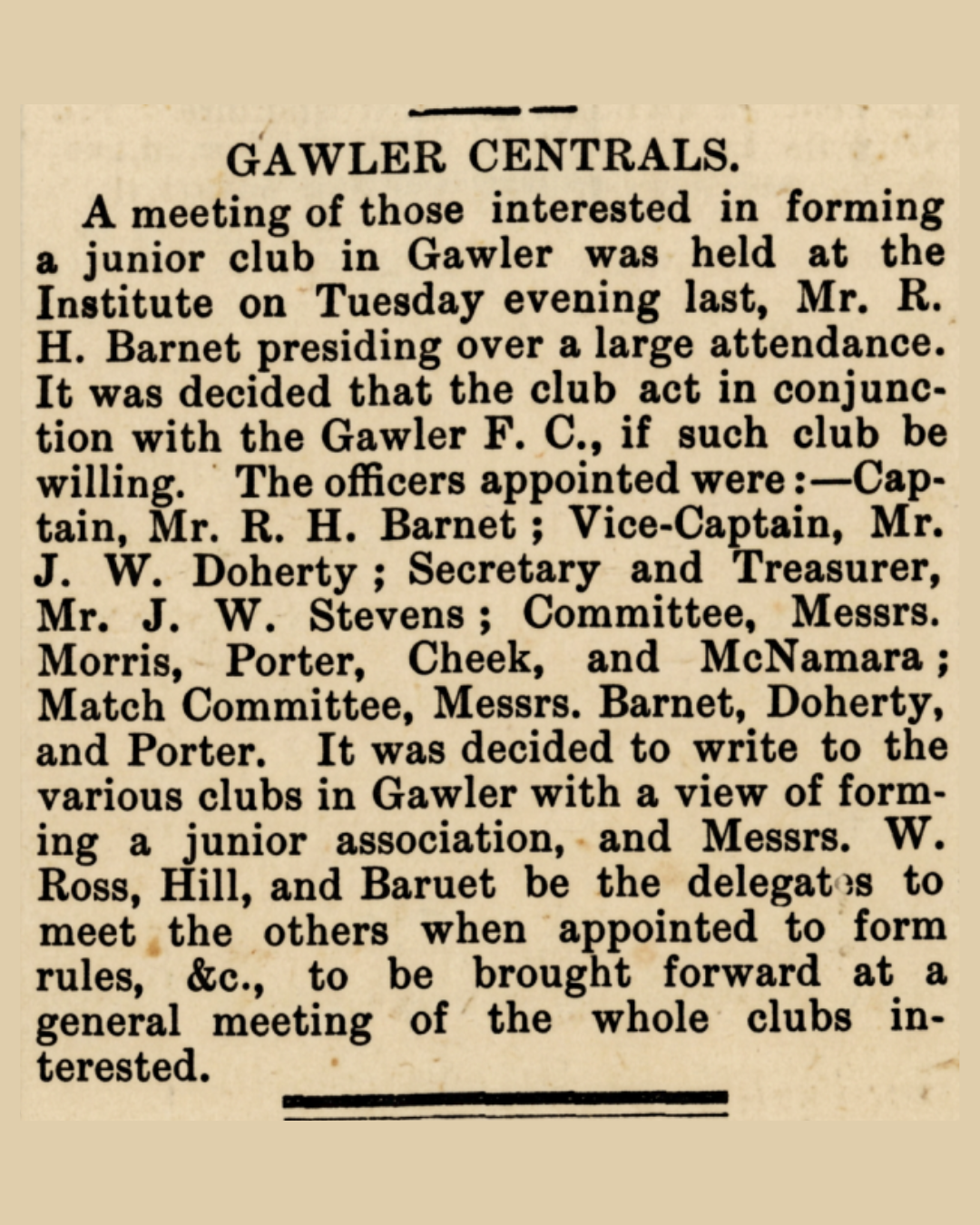
Evening Journal - Adelaide SA - Thur 21 March 1889

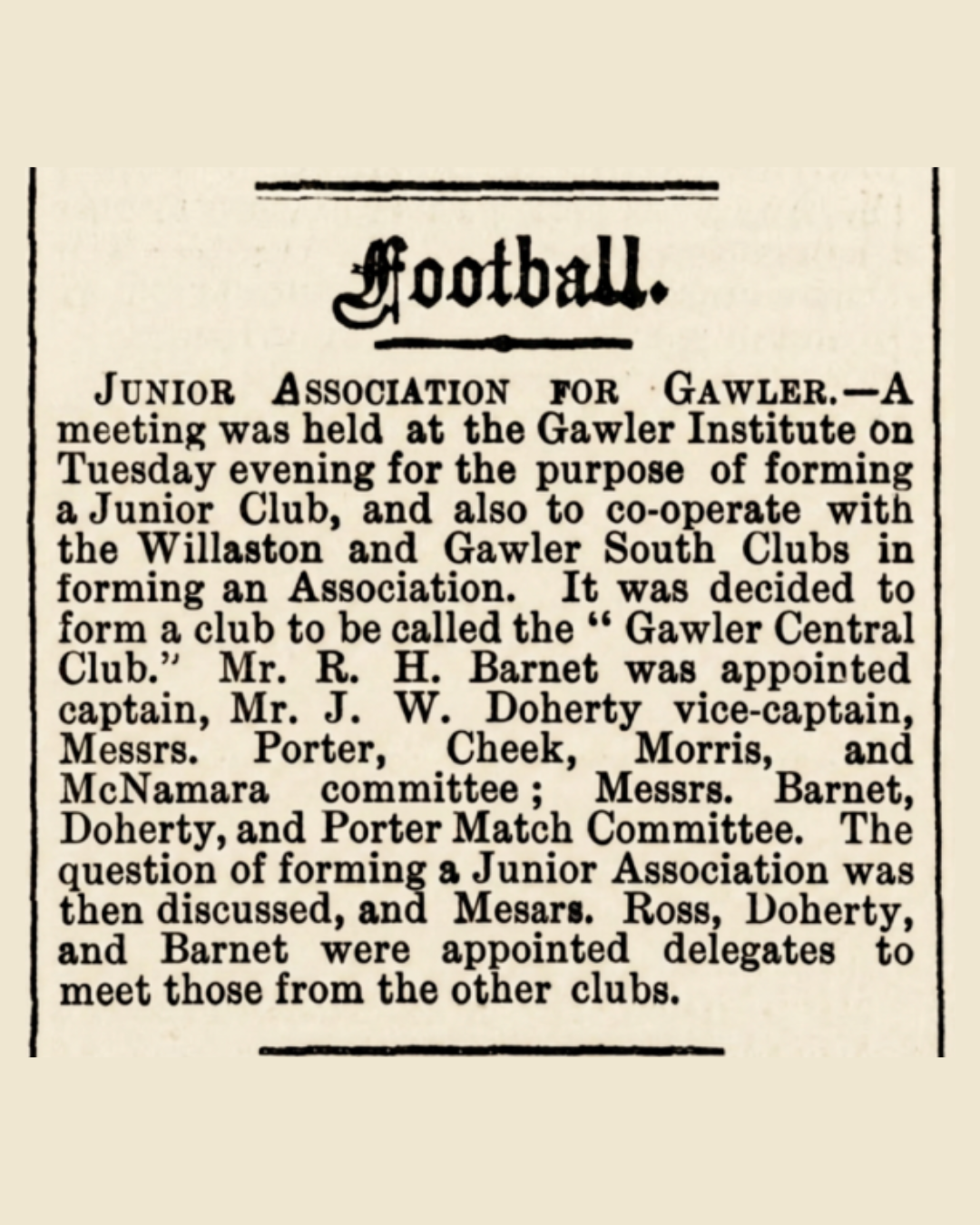
Evening Journal - Adelaide SA - Thur 21 March 1889

Following the move to establish the Gawler Junior Football Association, a meeting was held at the Gawler Institute on 19 March 1889 to form a new club representing the central Gawler area. The Gawler Central Football Club was established and resolved to act in conjunction with the Gawler Football Club and be part of the new local association.

The club's inaugural office bearers included:

- Captain – R.H. Barnet
- Vice-Captain – J.W. Doherty
- Secretary/Treasurer – J.W. Stevens

Gawler Central played its first formal match on 25 May 1889, facing Willaston at Gawler Oval and losing 2 goals 5 behinds to 1 goal 4 behinds

=== Colours and Nickname ===
Gawler Central wore orange and black from its inception, the same colours as the senior Gawler Football Club. Like the senior club, Gawler Central was also referred to in contemporary newspaper reports as the “Tigers”

=== Gawler Football Association Era ===
The Gawler Football Association served as the principal football competition in the district during the late nineteenth and early twentieth centuries. Member clubs varied over time and included Roseworthy College, Hamley Bridge, Salisbury, Greenock, Sandy Creek, Wasleys, Kangaroo Flat, Angle Vale and One Tree Hill.

Gawler Central won A Grade premierships in 1890, 1892, 1893, 1895, 1898, 1900, 1904, 1905, 1914 and 1919. Following its 1919 premiership, the club experienced a prolonged period without senior success before winning its next A Grade premiership in 1936, the final premiership won under the Gawler Football Association prior to the competition's transition to the Gawler & District Football League.

=== Gawler & District Football League ===
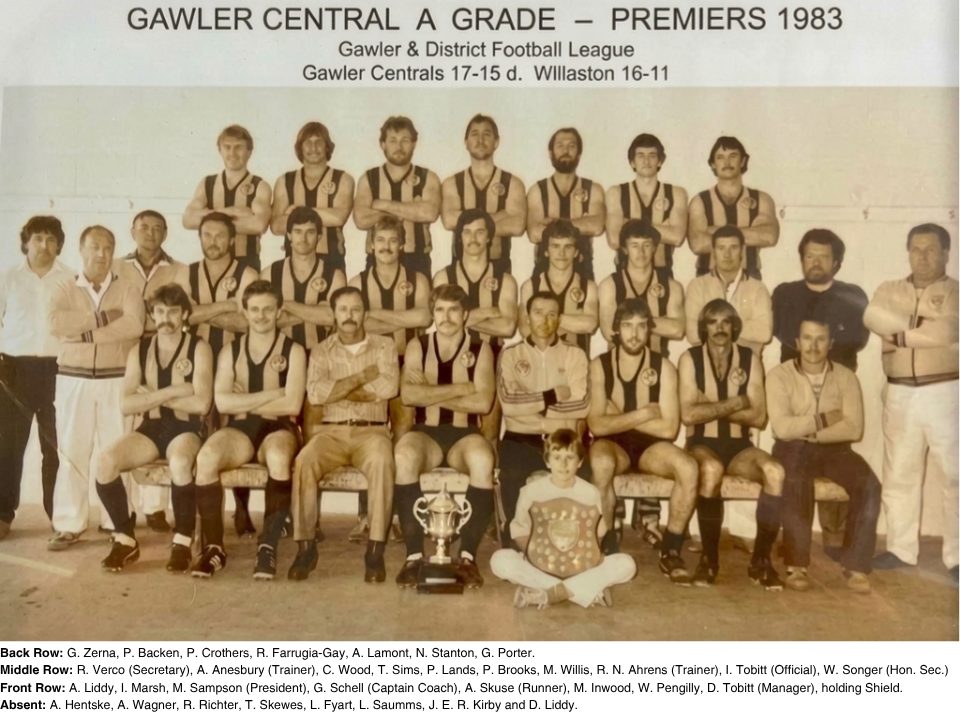
Drought Breakers - 1983 A Grade Premiers

The Gawler Football Association was renamed the Gawler & District Football League (GDFL) in 1953. By the mid-twentieth century, the competition included clubs from Gawler, the Adelaide Plains and surrounding northern districts. At its largest extent in 1955, member clubs included Gawler Central, South Gawler, Willaston, Hamley Bridge, Lyndoch, Roseworthy, Roseworthy College, Salisbury, Salisbury North, Smithfield, Virginia, Two Wells, Elizabeth and Elizabeth North

Gawler Central won the inaugural A Grade premiership contested under the Gawler & District Football League name in 1953. The club would not win another senior premiership until 1983, ending a 30-year premiership drought.

=== Barossa, Light & Gawler Football Association ===
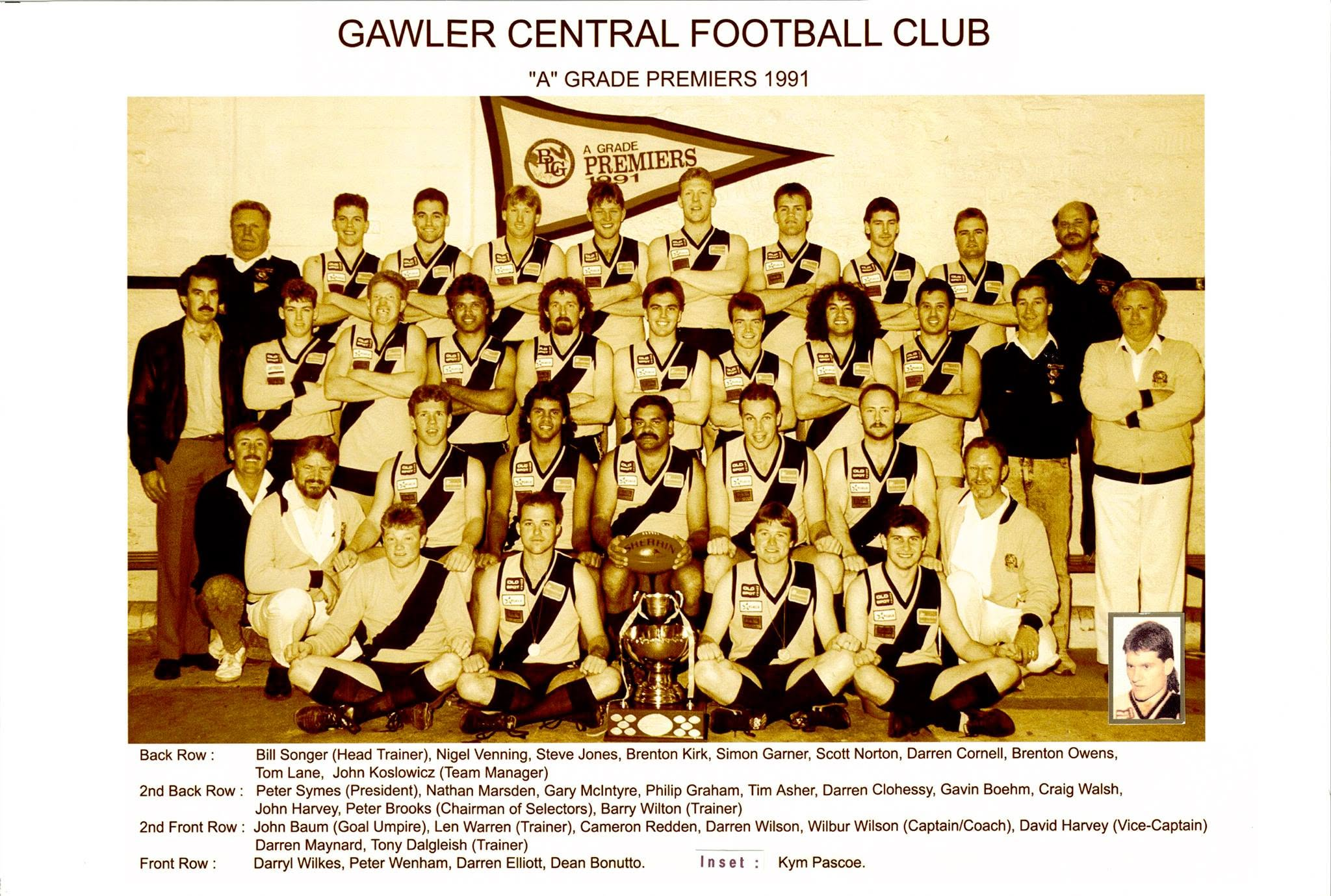
1991 BLG A Grade Premiers

In 1987, the Gawler & District Football League merged with the Barossa & Light Football Association to form the Barossa, Light & Gawler Football Association (BLGFA). The merger followed the decline of the GDFL and was intended to establish a sustainable long-term competition for football clubs throughout the northern districts of South Australia.

The Barossa & Light Football Association had been established in 1908 by Angaston, Freeling, Kapunda, Nuriootpa and Tanunda, with Eudunda joining the competition in 1910. Over subsequent decades, clubs including Greenock, Truro, Hamley Bridge, Eden Valley, Robertstown and Riverton-Saddleworth-Marrabel United (RSMU) also participated in the association at various times.

The foundation clubs of the BLGFA in 1987 were Angaston, Eudunda, Freeling, Gawler Central, Kapunda, Nuriootpa, RSMU, South Gawler, Tanunda and Willaston. Barossa District, formed through the merger of Lyndoch and Williamstown in 1979, joined the competition in 1991 after a four-season period in the Hills Football League.

Gawler Central became a foundation member of the new competition and won its first BLGFA A Grade premiership in 1991. Since then Gawler Central have won the A Grade Premiership 3 further times in 2001, 2014 and 2020

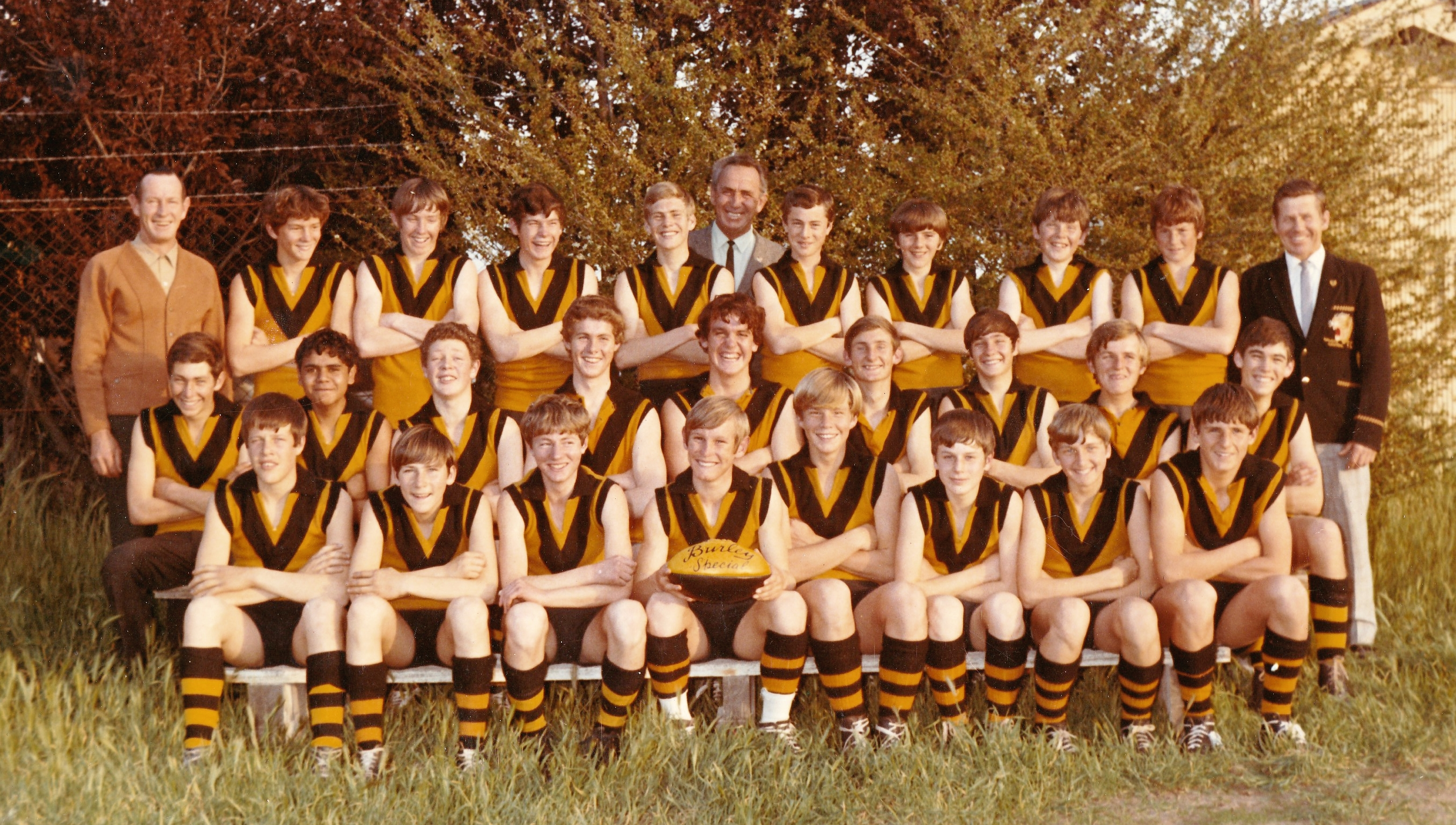
GCFC Colts Team Photo

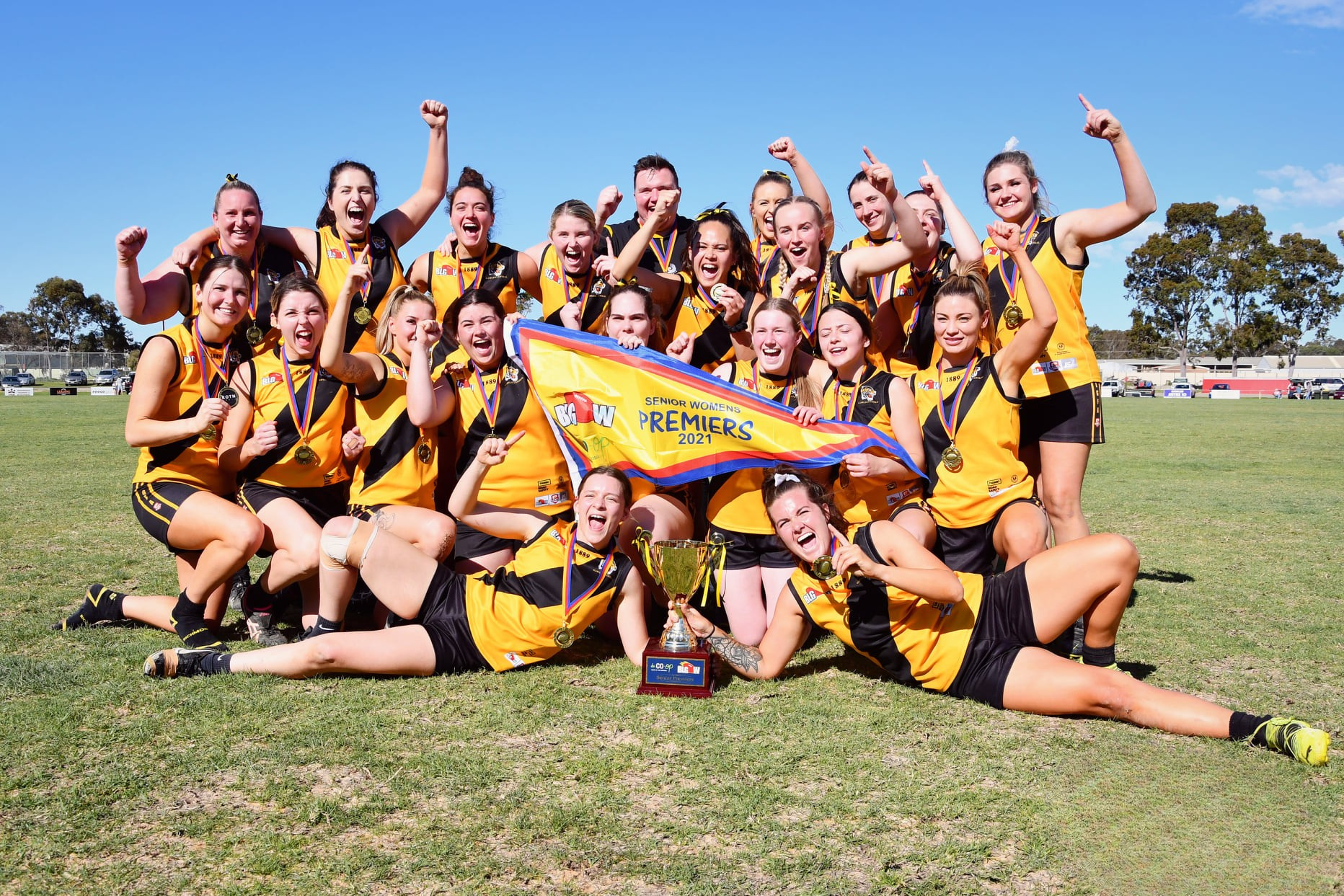
GCFC 2021 BLGW Premiers

=== Women's Football ===
In 2017, the Barossa, Light & Gawler Football Association established its first female football competition, initially comprising Under 14 and Under 17 girls grades. Gawler Central entered teams in both grades for the inaugural season.

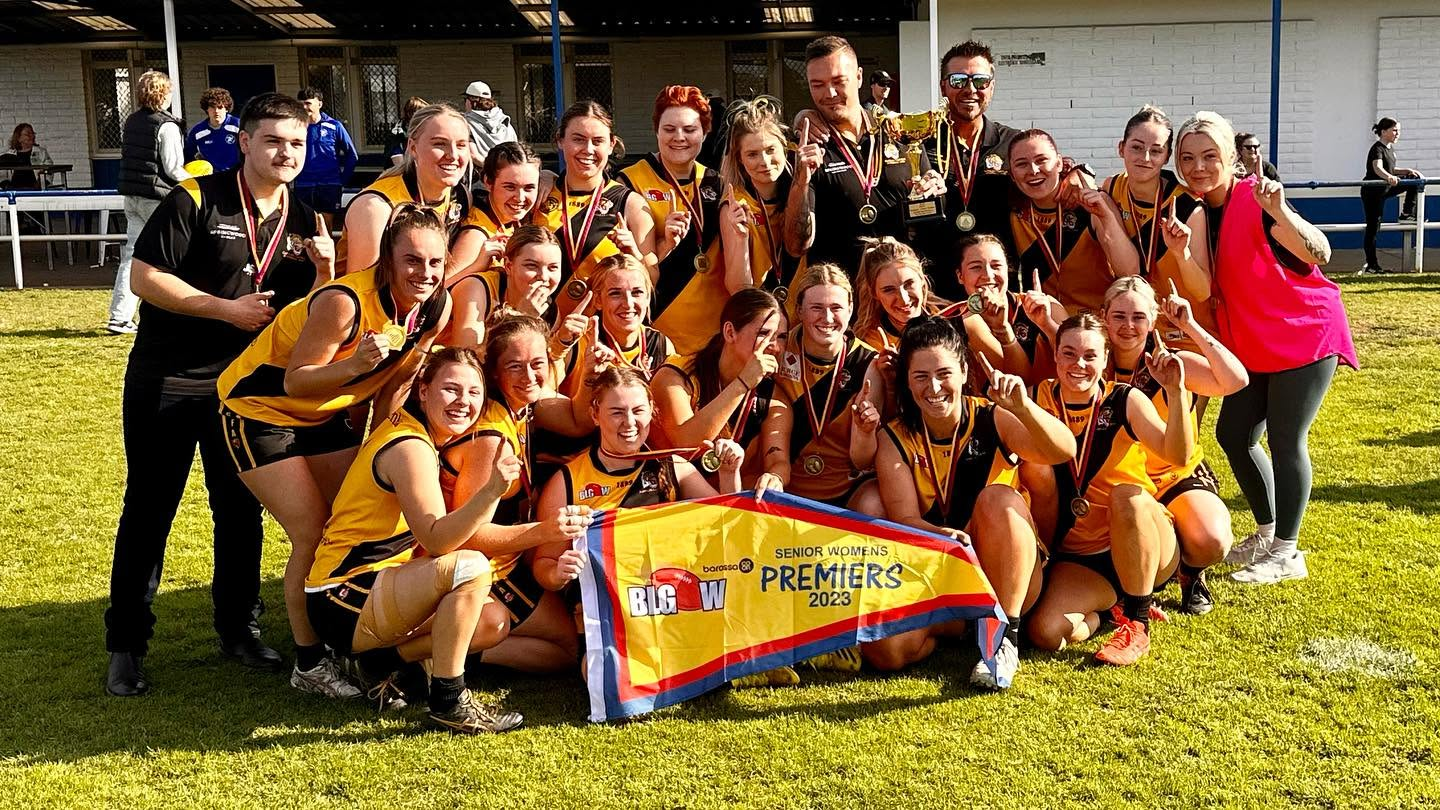
GCFC 2023 BLGW Premiers

Senior women’s football was introduced by the Association in 2018, with Gawler Central entering a team in the new competition.

Gawler Central won its first Senior Women’s premiership in 2021 and claimed a second premiership in 2023.

== Home Ground ==
=== Gawler Oval ===
Gawler Oval is located within the Essex Park & Gawler Showgrounds Regional Sporting Precinct and is one of Gawler’s most historic sporting venues. The oval has been a central venue for Australian rules football in Gawler since the early years of organised football in the district.

Gawler Oval remains the home ground of Gawler Central Football Club.

== Premierships ==
=== Male Programs ===
A Grade (17)

1890, 1892, 1893, 1895, 1898, 1900, 1904, 1905, 1914, 1919, 1936, 1953, 1983, 1991, 2001, 2014, 2020

Reserves (17)

1926, 1933, 1936, 1955, 1975, 1976, 1977, 1981, 1994, 1996, 2001, 2005, 2009, 2014, 2015, 2016, 2020

Senior Colts (16)

1963, 1973, 1978, 1979, 1980, 1986, 1987, 1994, 1995, 1997, 1998, 2002, 2005, 2015, 2023, 2024

Junior Colts (9)

1977, 1978, 1980, 1982, 1983, 1990, 2011, 2014, 2026

Under 13 (6)

2020, 2022, 2023, 2024, 2025, 2026

=== Female Programs ===
Senior Women (2)

2021, 2023

Under 16 (0)

-

Under 13 (0)

-
