= Brian Hurn =

Australian cricketer

Personal information
- Born: 4 March 1939; Angaston, Australia
- Died: 18 October 2015 (aged 76); Angaston, Australia
- Batting: Left-handed
- Bowling: Right-arm medium fast
- Role: All-rounder

Domestic team information
- Years: Team
- 1957/58–1966/67: South Australia

Career statistics
Competition	First-class
Matches	31
Runs scored	842
Batting average	21.05
100s/50s	0/2
Top score	79*
Balls bowled	4132
Wickets	56
Bowling average	37.91
5 wickets in innings	2
10 wickets in match	0
Best bowling	5/62
Catches/stumpings	22/–
- Source: Cricinfo, 8 November 2015

Brian Morgan Hurn OAM (4 March 1939 – 18 October 2015) was an Australian first-class cricketer and politician who served as Mayor of Barossa Council.

== Early life ==
Born in Angaston in the Barossa Valley of South Australia, Hurn first came to attention when he scored an unbeaten 108 in the inaugural Country Schoolboys Carnival in 1952. He attended the prestigious Prince Alfred College in Adelaide.

== Sports career ==
Hurn played first for the South Australian Colts side in the South Australian Grade Cricket League (the level below first-class cricket in South Australia) before switching to Kensington Cricket Club. He made his first-class cricket debut for South Australia on 1 November 1957, against Western Australia at the Adelaide Oval, scoring thirty and zero and taking three wickets for 67 runs (3/67) and 1/30. Hurn was still living in the Barossa at the time and was the last player living outside Adelaide to picked for the South Australian side until Rick Darling in 1975.

Described as "a fast-medium bowler with a side-on action", Hurn's best moment came in December 1958 when he took 5/62 against the touring English side, including leading batsmen Ted Dexter, Colin Cowdrey and Tom Graveney.

Hurn continued to play for South Australia intermittently over the next decade, playing his final first-class match on 13 January 1967, against Queensland at the Gabba, making an unbeaten 79 (his highest first-class score) and four and taking 0/11. Following the end of his first-class career, he continued to play for Kensington until his retirement in the 1977/78 season. In all Hurn scored 4358 runs in Grade cricket at 21.79 and took 615 wickets at 16.93.

Hurn also played Australian rules football for the Angaston Football Club in the Barossa Light & Gawler Football Association, winning the Mail Medal for the competition's best player.

== Political career ==
Hurn later served as Mayor of Barossa Council from 1996 to 2014. He was awarded a National Medal in 1994 "for diligent long service to the community in hazardous circumstances", a Medal of the Order of Australia (OAM) in 1999 "for service to local government through the Barossa Council, and to the community of Angaston", an Australian Sports Medal in 2000 "for service to Country and Metropolitan Football and SANFL Clubs" and a Centenary Medal in 2001 "for service to the community through local government at regional and state levels."

== Family ==
Hurn's son William played 135 games over 1982-89 for Central District Football Club in the South Australian National Football League (SANFL) and his grandson Shannon Hurn captained West Coast in the Australian Football League (AFL). His granddaughter Ashton Hurn was elected to state parliament as the member for Schubert at the 2022 South Australian state election.

== Sources ==
- Page, R. (1984) South Australian Cricketers 1877-1984, Association of Cricket Statisticians: Retford, Nottinghamshire.
- Sando, G. (1997) Grass Roots, South Australian Cricket Association: Adelaide. ISBN 1 86254 435 2.
- Sexton, M. (2017) Chappell's Last Stand, Affirm Press: Melbourne. ISBN 9781925584424.
