= Ashton Hurn =

Australian politician (born 1991)

Ashton Hurn MP
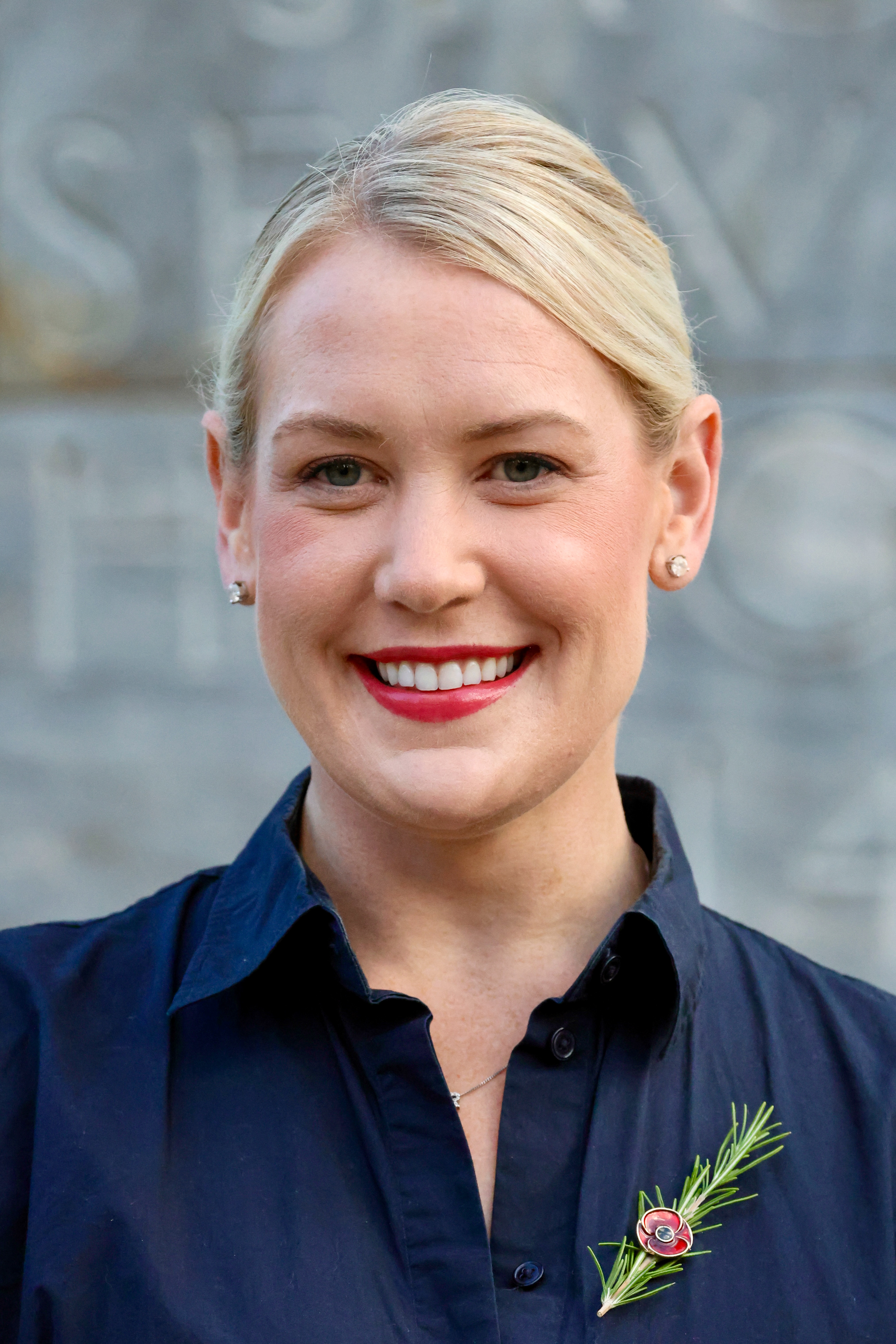
- Hurn in 2026

Leader of the Opposition in South Australia
- Incumbent
- Assumed office 8 December 2025
- Premier: Peter Malinauskas
- Deputy: Josh Teague
- Preceded by: Vincent Tarzia

Leader of the South Australian Liberal Party
- Incumbent
- Assumed office 8 December 2025
- Deputy: Josh Teague
- Preceded by: Vincent Tarzia

Member of the South Australian House of Assembly for Schubert
- Incumbent
- Assumed office 19 March 2022
- Preceded by: Stephan Knoll

Personal details
- Born: Ashton Morgan Hurn; 14 January 1991 (age 35) Ashford, South Australia, Australia
- Party: Liberal
- Spouse: Adam Howard (m. 2021)
- Children: 1
- Relatives: Brian Hurn (grandfather); Shannon Hurn (brother)
- Education: University of Adelaide (BSocSc)
- Occupation: Politician
- Website: ashtonhurn.com.au

Ashton Morgan Hurn (born 14 January 1991) is an Australian politician who has served as leader of the Opposition in South Australia and leader of the South Australian Liberal Party since December 2025. She is the second woman to hold both positions, after Isobel Redmond. She has represented Schubert in the South Australian House of Assembly since 2022.

Hurn was born and raised on her family's farm in Angaston, which is located in the Barossa Valley. She received her early education in Angaston Primary School and later went to Nuriootpa High School where she obtained her Bachelor of Social Science degree from the University of Adelaide.

Unsuccessful in obtaining preselection for Schubert before the 2014 state election, Hurn obtained preselection in 2021 and was elected at the 2022 state election. She became Shadow Minister for Health in April 2022 by opposition leader David Speirs and served in this position until December 2025.

Hurn was elected unopposed as leader of the Liberals on 8 December 2025 after the resignation of Vincent Tarzia. At the 2026 state election, Hurn defended her seat of Schubert, and the Liberals continued as the official opposition with five seats in the House of Assembly. Her portfolio as Shadow Minister in the shadow cabinet after the election included defence, space industries, and trade, industry and investment.

== Early life and education ==
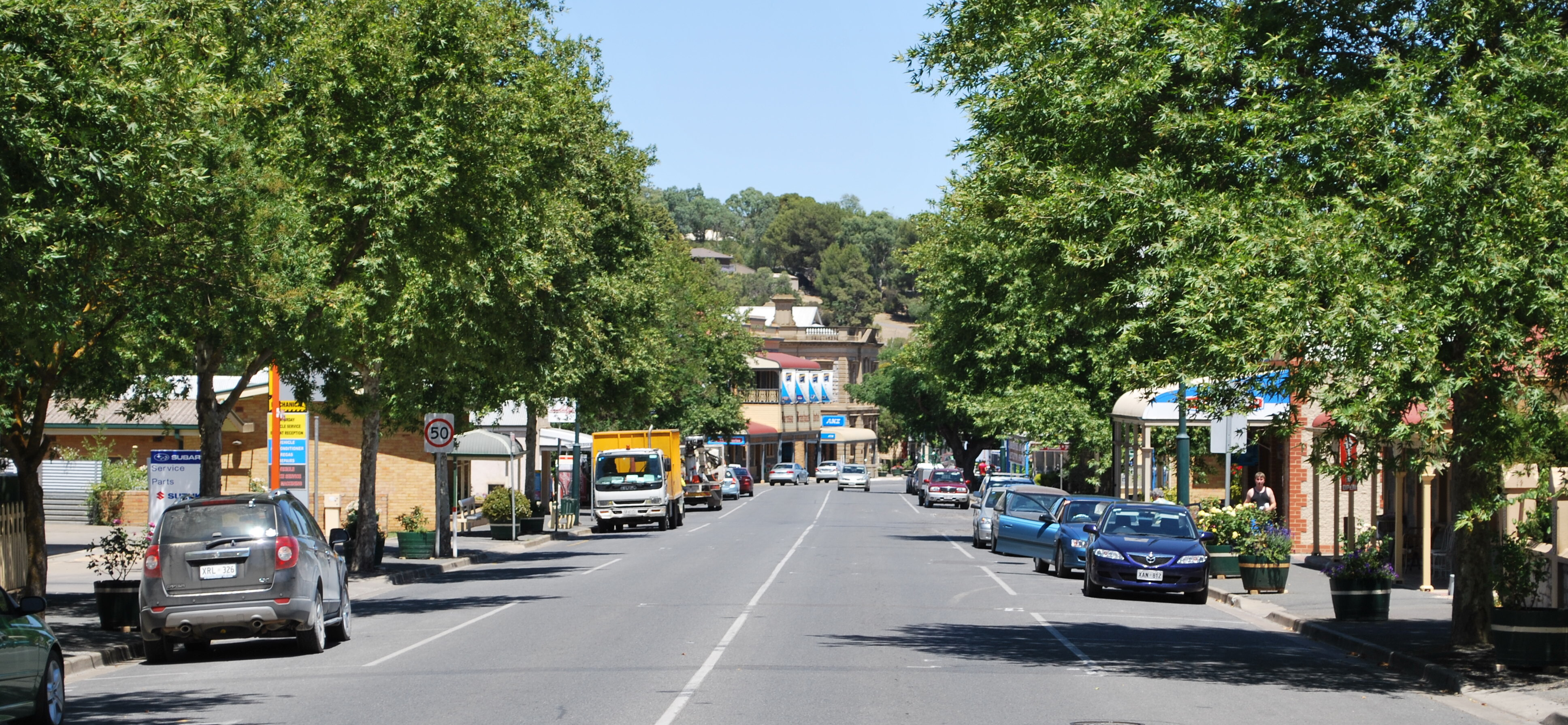
Murray Street in Angaston, January 2010

Ashton Morgan Hurn was born on 14 January 1994 in Ashford, South Australia, and grew up near Angaston in the Barossa Valley. As a sixth generation Barossan, she was brought up along with her elder brother Shannon on a farm which was owned and operated by her parents William and Sandi Hurn. Hurn's family reared sheep and also produced grapes and apricots. She used to help dry apricots, tended to vines in the vineyard and used to shear sheep and play cricket and Australian rules football with her brother.

Hurn received her education at Angaston Primary School and Nuriootpa High School. She graduated with a Bachelor of Social Sciences from the University of Adelaide and became the first one from her family to receive higher education.

Hurn started playing netball for Angaston at the age of seven and played in her first senior 1 grand final at the age of 15. Hurn represented South Australia in age groups ranging from under-13 to under-21 and debuted in the state league when she was in Year 12. In 2008, Hurn possessed a full netball scholarship at the South Australian Sports Institute and was among the four selected athletes for the Australian Talent Squad from its program.

In 2010, Hurn featured for the South Australia under-19 squad, which was ranked fourth in the national championships. She was chosen for the South Australia ANL team and for the Netball Australia under-19 development squad.

== Early political career ==
=== Political staffer and preselection (before 2022) ===
It is reported that Hurn owes her passion for politics to her grandfather Brian Hurn, who used to be the chair of the Angaston council and the mayor of the Barossa Council. During her studies, she met Dean Jaensch, a political scientist, who recommended Hurn to work in Steven Marshall's electorate office in Norwood. After that, she worked as the media and policy adviser for Marshall in both the opposition and government. Hurn also worked for two federal Liberal politicians, Anne Ruston and Christopher Pyne.

Hurn sought selection as the Liberal candidate for Schubert prior to the 2014 state election, but was unsuccessful in defeating Stephan Knoll. In 2018, Hurn was appointed as the director of media and communications for Marshall following his election as premier, and occupied this position during the COVID-19 pandemic.

Following Knoll's decision not to seek re-election at the 2022 state election, Hurn won Liberal preselection for Schubert in February 2021, polling 71 votes compared to 40 by Caroline Rhodes and five by Steve Balch.

=== Election to parliament and shadow health portfolio (2022–2025) ===
Hurn won the South Australian seat of Schubert for the Liberals in the House of Assembly on 19 March 2022. She gained 12,580 first preference votes (51.5%) and 15,124 two-party preferred votes (61.9%), winning her seat from Connor Watson of Labor by defeating him with a 3.8 point swing against the Liberals. The other new female Liberal members in the House of Assembly were Hurn and Penny Pratt.

On 21 April 2022, the opposition leader, David Speirs, made Hurn the Shadow Minister for Health. Hurn took overall responsibility for the portfolio, with Pratt responsible for regional health services, ageing and preventive health, while Tim Whetstone took responsibility for mental health and suicide prevention. Hurn became a member of the Standing Orders and Public Works committees on 3 May. She sat in the former committee until 30 May 2023, and in the latter committee until 30 April 2024. She was also a member of the COVID-19 Direction Accountability and Oversight Committee until 24 November 2022.

In her inaugural address delivered on 17 May 2022, Hurn proposed a new Barossa hospital and the restoration of the emergency departments at Gumeracha and Mount Pleasant. Additionally, road safety, water security, mental health care and local sporting facilities were listed as key areas. In her role as Shadow Health Minister, Hurn condemned the government's actions regarding ambulance ramping.

During a debate on 8 February 2024, Hurn asked the government to reinstate the coverage of doctors at Gumeracha District Soldiers' Memorial Hospital following a breakdown of talks between the government and the local medical practice. Further, Hurn addressed the issue of regular blackouts in Springton, Mount Pleasant and Eden Valley. In a subsequent debate held on the same day, Hurn voted in favour of laws to allow for the posthumous donation of eggs and embryos and to create a donor conception register. She asked whether those individuals who had already donated prior to 2004 and had been assured of anonymity were entitled to refuse disclosure of their identity.

While Hurn was on maternity leave in August 2024, Speirs resigned as leader of the Liberal Party, and she did not enter the race to become the new leader. On 19 August, Vincent Tarzia, who succeeded him as the Liberal leader, said that he would serve as the Shadow Minister for Health until Hurn's return.

Sometime in late April or early May 2025, Hurn presented a petition signed by 1,217 people, asking for the construction of a new hospital in Barossa, and talked about it in parliament. During the Estimates Committee B on 20 June, Hurn asked the Health Minister, Chris Picton, to reveal the business case of the hospital project and the status of site selection.

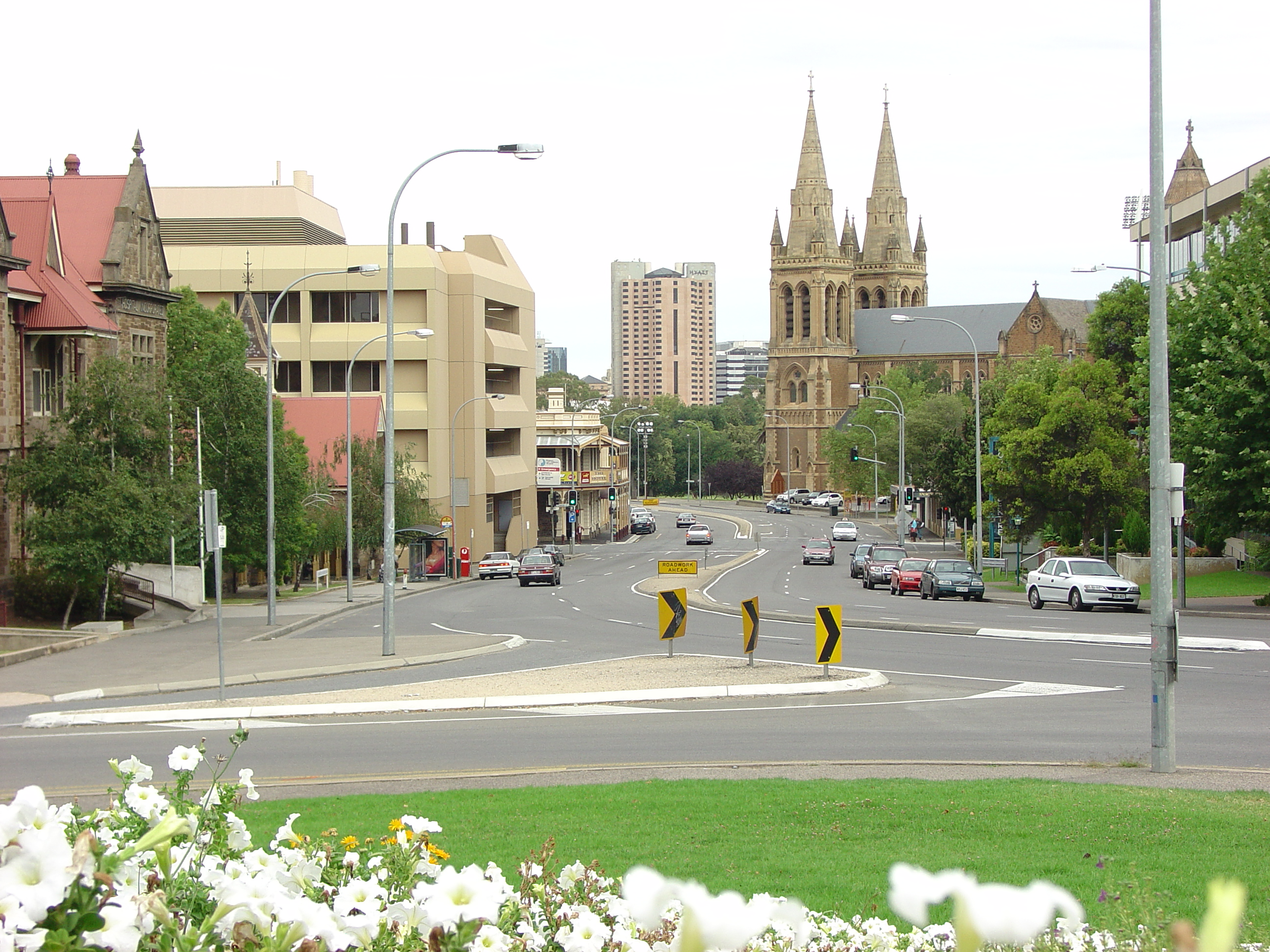
The Women's and Children's Hospital (left) on King William Road, North Adelaide

Hurn raised a concern at this hearing about whether the new Women's and Children's Hospital could be completed by 2031 within its A$3.2 billion budget. She also asked for information regarding the elective surgery recovery plan, emergency department wait times, health staffing shortages, and ambulance response times.

== Leader of the Opposition (2025–present) ==
=== Election as Liberal leader ===
Opposition Leader Hurn at the 2026 Anzac Day dawn service at Adelaide's National War Memorial

Hurn became the leader of the South Australian Liberal Party on 8 December 2025 uncontested following the resignation of Vincent Tarzia to become the Leader of the Opposition. As a first-term member for Schubert, Hurn is the third party leader since its government defeat in 2022. Josh Teague continued as the deputy leader. The priorities for the March 2026 state election according to Hurn included cost of living, healthcare, and community safety. In an interview with ABC News, she promised to reconsider the party's policy stance, outline funding of its stamp duty proposal and work out a plan for the state debt reduction.

Hurn announced her first shadow cabinet on 12 December without changing its members but redistributing several portfolios. Hurn appointed Ben Hood to be the Shadow Treasurer and Hurn herself assumed health and wellbeing portfolios, which include mental health and suicide prevention. Jack Batty added the education portfolio to his portfolios of policing and corrections, whereas Tarzia received the portfolios of sports, recreation, and racing. Mining and energy portfolios were introduced and tax reform transferred to the Shadow Treasurer.

=== 2026 state election campaign ===
In January 2026, Hurn justified the board of the Adelaide Festival's withdrawal of Palestinian author Randa Abdel-Fattah's invitation to the Adelaide Writers' Week and encouraged writers who withdrew in protest to reconsider their stance.

In the campaign, Hurn made a target of meeting voters from all 47 state electorates. The policy of the Liberals included 50-cent public transport ticket prices, an exemption from stamp duty for first homebuyers buying pre-owned property priced at up to A$1 million, and a reduction of $15,000 of stamp duty for downsizers. Additionally, the party committed to retaining the former Women's and Children's Hospital precinct, harsher penalties for breaches of bail and investment of $10 million in community safety.

Hurn's campaign included promises to provide $350 million for the construction of a new hospital in the Barossa region, should the Liberals come to power. Another promise was that the party would retain the existing Women's and Children's Hospital site and use it as a health precinct, along with expanding the Royal Adelaide Hospital and nurse recruitment and retention programs.

Hurn promised to abolish the First Nations Voice to Parliament in South Australia. In February, shadow Aboriginal affairs minister Teague promised the Liberals would refocus their resources to the Community Constables initiative and Shooting Stars campaign. The party also suggested scrapping the state's net-zero commitments. Hurn advocated for the introduction of financial incentives to plant trees and install solar panels.

Hurn stated on 12 March that candidate Carston Woodhouse, who ran in the race for Wright, withdrew from the campaign after the statements he made regarding religion, feminism, and gay marriage became an issue. The next day, Hurn revealed that she was willing to look into the party's candidate selection process.

Sea foam at the West Beach Boat Harbour, 22 October 2025

On 13 March, Hurn engaged in a televised debate with Premier Peter Malinauskas at Adelaide Oval, mediated by Rory McClaren. She criticised the government's record of ambulance ramping, patient information security, and response to the coastal algal bloom. The leaders discussed housing affordability, state debt and energy policy issues. Hurn advocated for a four-year salary freeze for the state MP, and Malinauskas reminded that an independent tribunal set the salaries.

=== Election result and post-election shadow cabinet ===
At the state election held on 21 March 2026, Hurn won the seat of Schubert from Labor's James Rothe. According to the ABC, Hurn had won 47.0% of first preferences and 67.4% of two-candidate-preferred votes, with 93.4% of votes counted. Labor was elected back into office. On election night, Hurn congratulated Malinauskas, conceded defeat for the Liberals and stated that she would remain their leader.

Composition of the House of Assembly after the 2026 state election

On 24 March, Hurn vowed to re-examine Liberal policies, campaigning and preference strategy. With Teague's successful retention of Heysen, the Liberals were able to hold onto five House of Assembly seats while One Nation could only secure four seats, meaning the Liberals retained official opposition status. Hurn dismissed One Nation leader Cory Bernardi's contention that his party deserved official opposition.

On 2 April, Hurn announced a new shadow cabinet, and assigned portfolio responsibilities to all 11 Liberal parliamentarians. Hurn herself became responsible for the Defence and Space Industries portfolios, and Trade, Industry and Investment. Teague stayed as the deputy leader, and took the Housing and Planning portfolios. Hood stayed as the Shadow Treasurer, and took Energy and Mining, while Batty took Health and Wellbeing.

=== Budget reply and infrastructure scrutiny ===
On 16 June 2026, in response to the first budget from an opposition perspective, Hurn criticised departmental overspending and made reference to a prediction that state debt would be close to $54 billion by mid-2030. She announced the draft bill entitled the Public Finance Transparency Bill 2026 that required ministers to report overspending of departments to the parliament, and the Treasurer to provide periodic financial updates. Furthermore, Hurn also wanted to cut down the public service by 4,000 back-office employees and increased payroll tax threshold from $1.5 million to $2.1 million.

In October, Hurn urged for the removal of Infrastructure and Transport Minister Joe Szakacs from the portfolio because of the poor management of the contracting issue related to the $15.4 billion road construction project, Torrens to Darlington. She urged the government to explain at what time the minister became aware of the problem. On 3 November, after the second contractor was excluded from the project, Hurn reiterated her demands for conducting a forensic investigation into all project contracts.

== Personal life ==
In her first speech in parliament, Hurn spoke about how her family roots dated back to 1850 when her great-great-great-grandfather William Hurn arrived in Angaston from Bath, Somerset, and became a part of the community. Her grandfather, Brian, was a member of the Sheffield Shield-winning cricket team representing the state in the 1963–64 season.

In 2018, Hurn and her parents went to the changerooms together with her brother Shannon, who led the West Coast Eagles to the AFL premiership that year. When Shannon retired in 2023, he spoke about playing football with his sister as one of his best memories.

Hurn married Adam Howard in December 2021 on her family's property. Howard previously worked as a media adviser to Pyne. In May 2024, Hurn and Howard welcomed a son named Rupert.

South Australian House of Assembly
| Preceded by Stephan Knoll | Member for Schubert; 2022–present | Incumbent |
| Preceded by Vincent Tarzia | Leader of the Opposition in South Australia; 2025–present | Incumbent |
Party political offices
| Preceded by Vincent Tarzia | Leader of the Liberal Party of Australia (South Australian Division); 2025–present | Incumbent |
