= Barossa District Football Club =

Barossa District

Names
- Full name: Barossa District Football & Netball Club
- Former name(s): Williamstown Saints Lyndoch
- Nickname(s): Bull(dogs)
- Motto: Be a Better Bulldog

Club details
- Founded: 1979 (merger)
- Colours: Red White Blue
- Competition: Barossa Light & Gawler Football Association
- President: Simon Carpenter
- Coach: Ash (Red) Barnett
- Premierships: 10 (1982, 1987, 1988, 1990, 2006, 2007, 2012, 2013, 2016 and 2017)
- Ground(s): Williamstown Oval (1952-2024)
- Lyndoch Recreation Park (Barossa Park) (1947-? 2025-) (capacity: 5000~ (AFL))
- Former ground(s): Williamstown Oval (1952-2024)

Uniforms
Home

Other information
- Official website: barossadistrictfc.org.au

The Barossa District Football & Netball Club is an Australian sports club based in the Barossa Valley region of South Australia. The club is nicknamed the Bulldogs, and represents the towns of Lyndoch and Williamstown. The sports that Barossa District participate in are, Australian Rules Football in the Barossa Light & Gawler Football Association and Netball in the Barossa light and Gawler netball association.

The Barossa District Football and Netball Club was formed in 1979 following the merger of the Lyndoch Football Club and The Williamstown Rovers football club. Williamstown used to play on the Hills Football League (HFL) from 1967-1973, then moving to the Gawler and Districts Football League.

== History ==
=== Lyndoch FC ===
Lyndoch FC uniform

The Lyndoch Football Club was reformed in 1947 after the end of World War II and competed in the Lower North Football Association along with clubs in Greenock, Kangaroo Flat, Roseworthy, Sandy Creek, Smithfield and Truro. Lyndoch had won three premierships before the Lower North league folded in 1954, which resulted in the club going into recess. Lyndoch Football Club were based at Lyndoch Oval where they shared the venue with the Lyndoch Cricket Club.

Lyndoch reformed again in 1960 and began competition in the Gawler & District Football Association. They won the 1965 premiership beating Gawler 8.7.55 to 7.9.51 at Gawler Oval. However, that would be their last ever flag, despite grand final appearances in 1966, 1972, 1974 and 1978. The club merged with Williamstown Rovers the following year after the 1979 season.

The Lyndoch FC 1965 premiership reunion was held in 2015 at the Lyndoch pavilion to celebrate 50 years since the club's last premiership.

=== Williamstown Rovers FC ===
Williamstown FC uniform

The Williamstown FC was based at Queen Victoria Jubilee Park in Williamstown which is Barossa District's current home ground and previously had the same colours of blue and gold as Lyndoch, as they had previously competed in the Torrens Valley Football Association until 1962, but changed to the Saints colours when they left the Hills Football League in 1973, as Lyndoch already donned the same colours. The competing clubs in the Gawler & District Football Association were Gawler Central, Willaston, Roseworthy and Lyndoch. Williamstown won the 1961 premiership after going through the entire season undefeated. However the club went into recess in 1963 due to a lack of player numbers.

Williamstown Rovers FC was founded in 1967 as a predecessor of the former club that went into recess and competed in the Hills Football League zone 2. Other competing teams in the competition were Pleasant Valley, Gumeracha, Woodside Army, Lenswood Ranges, Birdwood, Sedan Cambrai and Mount Torrens. Throughout the club's history a premiership never arrived despite some reasonably good on field performance where the club would only just fall short of making a Grand Final. Williamstown Rovers would merge with Lyndoch after the 1979 season.

=== Barossa District FC ===
Both former clubs Lyndoch and Williamstown Rovers had a long-lasting rivalry in both the Torrens Valley and Gawler & District leagues, with the meeting being held on November 7, 1979 where the decision was made to merge the two clubs. The club was named Barossa District after the local council area and the club wanted 'neutral colours', donning the red, white and blue, and the same of the Central District Football Club. The guernsey consisted of a blue design with a red and white V with the Bulldogs logo.

The first year of competition for the new club was slow but earned a Finals spot after winning the last 8 games of the home and away season, despite being eliminated early. Games were spread at both Lyndoch and Williamstown in Barossa District's early years. The 1981 season saw Barossa District lacking the quality players needed to be competitive enough to reach Finals, but that changed the following year when the maiden day came in 1982 when they won their first premiership. However, injuries of key players prevented the Bulldogs from making Finals in 1983, and the club's lack of Finals competition continued until 1987 when the move was made to the Hills Football League zone 2 following the amalgamation between the Gawler and Barossa & Light leagues. During the club's four-year stint competing with clubs in and around the Adelaide Hills three more premierships were won in 1987, 1988 and 1990 beating Mount Torrens, Kersbrook and Nairne Bremer.

There was increasing pressure for the club to move to the Barossa Light & Gawler Football Association following the 1990 premiership. Senior and junior football and netball were playing at many different venues at once and many involved with the club wished for a move to the Barossa league which provided a more family friendly environment. With enough support, Barossa District entered the BL&GFA for the 1991 season. However, this would not only see a premiership drought but also a lack of on field success for the club also, with their only Finals appearances in 1995. The late 1990s would see the Bulldogs plummet even further, winning only one game in 1998 and 1999.

The early 2000s saw the continued lack of on field success despite efforts by members of the club to promote development of the club through junior development, fundraising and facility extension. The umpire changerooms, facilities for trainers, a handicapped toilet and a committee room were added in 2002 but the poor on field success and small number of games won continued which resulted in the loss of funds that were raised within the club. Things started looking better in 2005 when the club received funds from a loaned vineyard, hosted the Grand Final at Nuriootpa and recruited coach Steve O'Connor who turned things around even more for the Bulldogs to win their first BL&GFA flag the following season in 2006. The Bulldogs made five straight Grand Finals from 2006 to 2010, winning both 2006 and 2007 over Freeling but losing to Tanunda in 2008, 2009 and 2010.

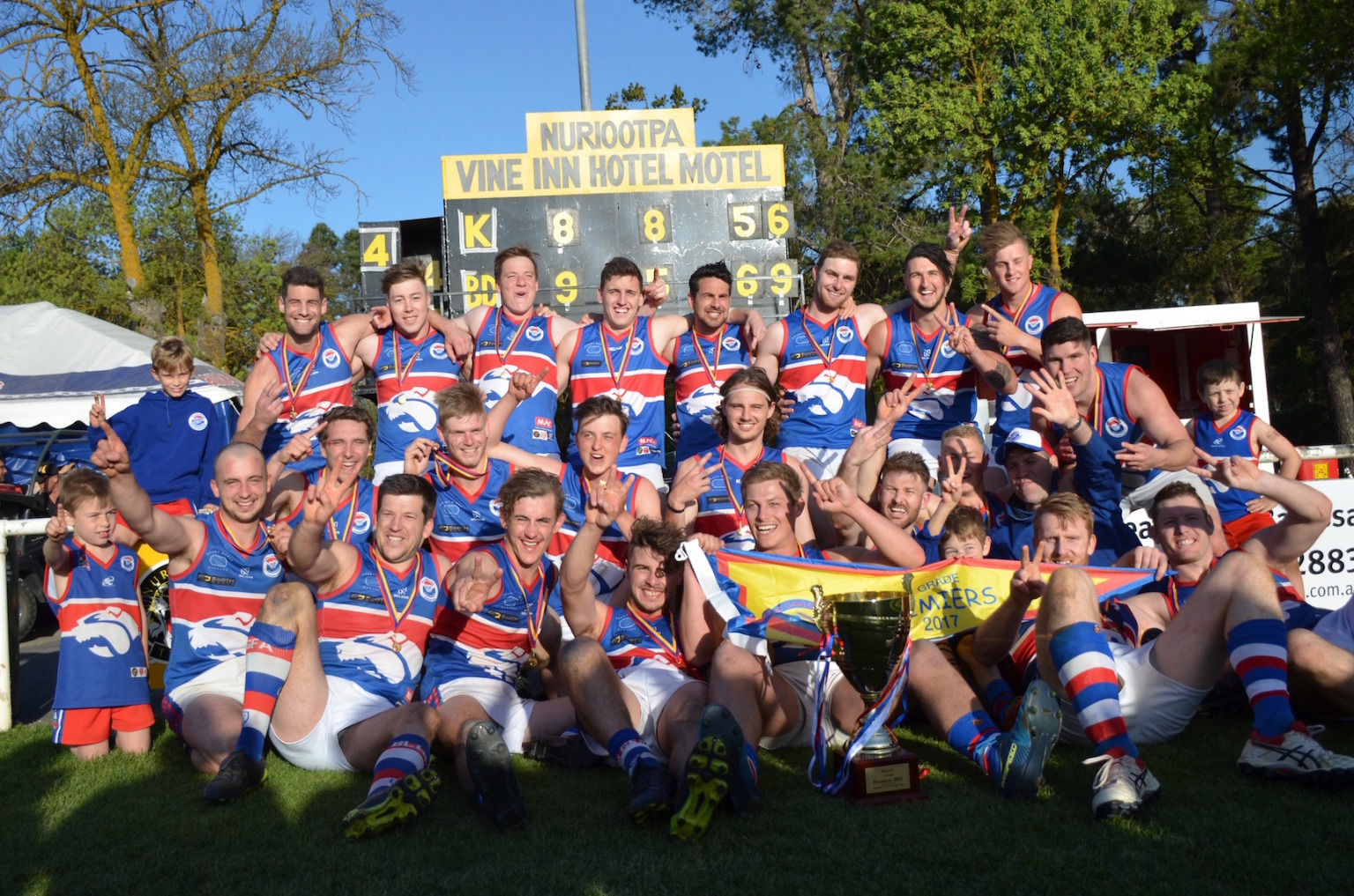
2017 Premiership team

2011 saw Barossa District finish 3rd and make Finals despite being defeated by Willaston after the opposition called a player count at the beginning of the 3rd quarter, believing Barossa District had a 19th man on the field when the quarter hadn't officially started and the player was just metres away from leaving the field of play. The following 2012 season saw Barossa District beat South Gawler and Kapunda to reach the Grand Final, after finishing 4th during the season, to oppose a strong Tanunda outfit who were going for their 5th consecutive premiership. Barossa District overcame the opposition and soundly beat the Magpies by 26 points.

A thrilling encounter ensued in the following 2013 decider between Gawler Central and Barossa District, the Bulldogs again emerging victorious, this time by 5 points. Both 2014 and 2015 saw the Bulldogs miss the Finals but premiership success returned for the following two seasons in 2016 and 2017, beating a previously undefeated Gawler Central by 11 points and edging out Kapunda as underdogs in the 2017 Grand Final by 13 points.

The most recent season of 2019 saw Barossa District finish 4th and make Finals, beating Freeling in an elimination final before falling to Nuriootpa the following week.

== Club song ==
In tune to 'Click Go The Shears'

"Out on the field is the team of the year,

Look how we're scoring the crowd gives a cheer,

Goal after goal now you won't see us stop,

Fiercely determined 'till we reach the top,

We are the Bulldogs can't you see,

Red, white and blue for victory,

Strong and courageous we'll get the ball,

Watch Barossa District we're the best of them all,

Woof! Woof!"
