= Tanunda Football Club =

Tanunda

Names
- Full name: Tanunda Football Club
- Nickname(s): Magpies
- Motto: Pride Passion Respect

2023 season
- After finals: 7th
- Home-and-away season: 7th
- Leading goalkicker: Jarrod Traynor (34)
- Dale John Medal: Sam Colquhoun

Club details
- Founded: 1908; 117 years ago
- Colours
- Competition: BLGFA
- President: Vacant
- Coach: Sam Colquhoun
- Captain(s): Bailey Smith
- Premierships: BLFA (10)– 1934, 1936, 1937, 1947, 1950, 1951, 1961, 1963, 1980, 1982 BLGFA (8) – 1987, 1989, 2002, 2008, 2009, 2010, 2011, 2019
- Ground(s): Tanunda Oval

Uniforms
Home	Away

Other information
- Official website: tanundafc.com.au

The Tanunda Football Club, nicknamed the Magpies, is an Australian rules football club based in the Barossa Valley town of Tanunda, South Australia, and competes in the Barossa Light & Gawler Football Association.

== History ==
Prior to the Tanunda Football Club's official establishment in 1908, teams representing the town had been competing in the form of scratch matches for almost 20 years. Tanunda became a founding member of the Barossa & Light Football Association. In its early years Tanunda struggled in terms of on-field success and didn't make a Grand Final until 1926 where the Magpies suffered at the hands of Angaston, with history repeating six years later in 1932 when the two sides met again in a Grand Final. However, the club's first premiership arrived in 1934 when they defeated Kapunda in the Grand Final.

Tanunda's history of competing in the Barossa and Light Football Association before the league merged with the Gawler & District Football League in 1987 to create the current league that the Magpies play in, has been successful despite their record of 10 premierships being eclipsed by four other clubs, two of those being Kapunda and Angaston. Tanunda have been one of the most successful clubs in the BL&GFA since 1987, winning the inaugural BL&GFA flag and winning four premierships in a row from 2008 to 2011. The 2008 and 2010 seasons not only saw Tanunda beat Barossa District in the Grand Finals but the Magpies also achieved the rare feat of going through the entire seasons undefeated. Tanunda made the 2018 and 2019 Grand Finals, losing to Nuriootpa and beating Angaston the following year respectively.

== Notable players ==
AFL LISTED PLAYERS:

Nathan Steinberner (Port Adelaide Football Club 20 Games)

Justin Westhoff (Port Adelaide Football Club 280 Games)

Matthew Westhoff (Port Adelaide Football Club 6 Games)

Jez McLennan (Gold Coast Football Club 0 Games)

== Premierships ==
The club has won the Barossa and Light Football Association premiership ten times (1934, 1936, 1937, 1947, 1950, 1951, 1961, 1963, 1980 and 1982) and the Barossa Light & Gawler Football Association premiership eight times (1987, 1989, 2002, 2008, 2009, 2010, 2011 and 2019).

== Life Members ==
Tanunda Football Club bestows the category Life Member on worthy and deserving individuals who have rendered outstanding service to the club.

Prior 1947 G Kroemer (Deceased)

1947 R Heuzenroeder (Deceased) AA Richer (Deceased) C Meyer (Deceased)

1963 R Hage (Deceased) CW Lindner (Deceased)

1970 R Stocker (Deceased) Dr AC Behrndt (Deceased)

1971 M Hueppauff (Deceased) A Pfeiffer (Deceased)

1973 R Mibus (Deceased)

1974 BH Keil (Deceased)

1975 T Hebbard (Deceased) F Murphy (Deceased)

1976 A Pellegrini (Deceased)

1977 B Hentschke

1980 C Goern (Deceased) E Lindner

1982 G Miller (Deceased) RE Giersch

1984 C Lindner (Deceased)

1985 D Kuhlmann (Deceased)

1986 P Lindner (Deceased)

1987 R Graetz (Deceased)

1988 DA John

1990 J Keil

1992 Mrs N Thompson (Deceased)

1993 M Thom (Deceased)

1997 I Curren

1999 Mrs L Lindner

2003 I Grieger

2006 A Leske G Tarca

2010 D Pech J Rowe (Deceased)

2011 S Lindner J Ferrett

2013 A Hamann

2014 A Schmidt

2015 M Schwarz

2017 C Neldner

2018 C Murphy T Greening

2019 J Goern K Schulz

2021 K May R Schmidt G Noack

2022 T Brooks D Westhoff (Deceased) D Eggleton
