= 2025 South Australian Liberal Party leadership election =

- 8 December 2025
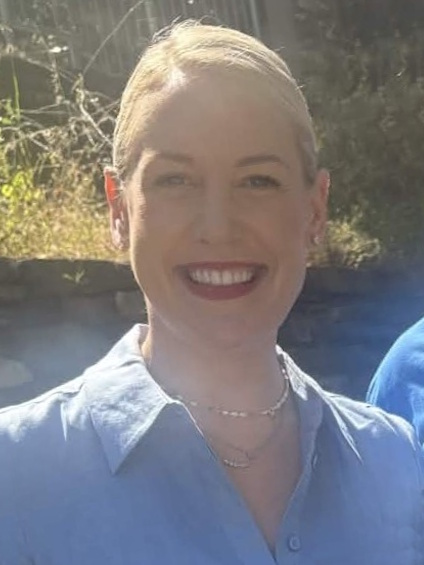
Candidate	Ashton Hurn
Caucus vote	Unopposed
Seat	Schubert
Faction	Moderate
Leader before election
Vincent Tarzia
Elected Leader
Ashton Hurn

The 2025 South Australian Liberal Party leadership election was on 8 December 2025 to elect a new leader of the South Australian Liberal Party and Leader of the Opposition in South Australia. The incumbent leader, Vincent Tarzia, had announced on 5 December 2025 via a press release that he would step down at 17:00 SA time that day. Ashton Hurn, a first-term female MLA and incumbent shadow health minister, was elected unopposed as party leader.

Tarzia's resignation came less than 100 days before early voting was to begin for the 2026 South Australian state election. It was also the fourth Liberal leader to either be ousted or resign in a month, following the resignations of Leanne Castley in Canberra and Mark Speakman in New South Wales, as well as the defeat of Brad Battin in the 2025 Victorian Liberal Party leadership spill, each of these being replaced respectively by Mark Parton, Kellie Sloane and Jess Wilson, the latter two also first-term female MLAs like Hurn.

== Candidates ==
Confirmed candidates
Candidate	Electorate	Faction	Position(s)
Ashton Hurn	Schubert	Moderate	Shadow Minister for Health (2022–present)

Declined
Candidate	Electorate	Faction	Position(s)
Josh Teague	Heysen	Moderate	Deputy Leader of the Opposition (2022–present)

== See also ==
- 2025 Liberal Party of Australia leadership election
- 2025 New South Wales National Party leadership election
