= Ian McLean (cricketer) =

Australian cricketer (born 1954)

Personal information
- Full name: Ian Robert McLean
- Born: 30 January 1954 (age 72); Adelaide, Australia
- Batting: Right-handed
- Relatives: Bob McLean (father)

Domestic team information
- Years: Team
- 1976/77–1982/83: South Australia

Career statistics
Competition	First-class	List A
Matches	23	1
Runs scored	1,042	35
Batting average	26.05	35.00
100s/50s	2/4	0/0
Top score	111	35
Catches/stumpings	9/–	0/–
- Source: Cricinfo, 13 January 2025

Ian Robert McLean (born 30 January 1954) is a former Australian cricketer. He played 23 first-class matches for South Australia between 1976 and 1983.
