= Shannon Hurn =

Australian rules footballer, born 1987

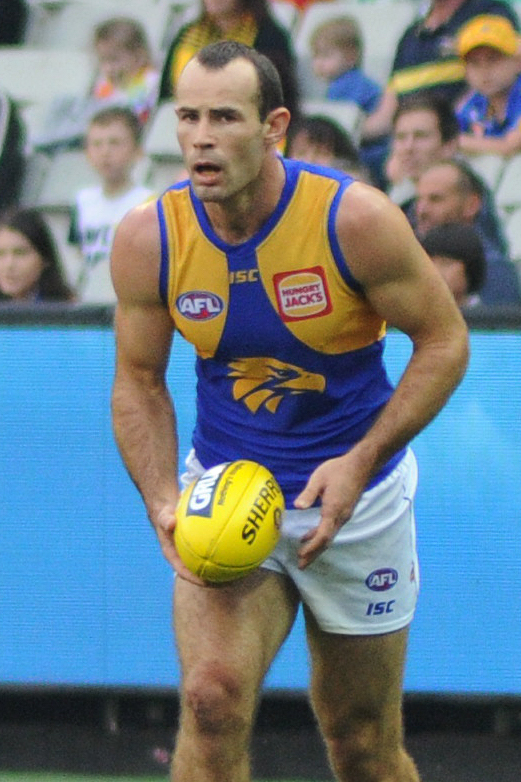
- Hurn playing for West Coast in April 2018

Personal information
- Full name: Shannon William Hurn
- Nickname: Bunga
- Born: 4 September 1987 (age 39); Angaston, South Australia
- Original team: Central District (SANFL)
- Draft: 13th overall, 2005 national draft (West Coast)
- Height: 188 cm (6 ft 2 in)
- Weight: 95 kg (209 lb)
- Position: Defender

Playing career^{1}
Years	Club	Games (Goals)
2006–2023	West Coast	333 (50)
- ^{1} Playing statistics correct to the end of the 2023 season.

Career highlights
- West Coast captain: 2015–2019; AFL premiership captain: 2018; West Coast games record holder; 2× All-Australian team: 2018, 2019 (vc); AFLPA best captain: 2019; 3× Glendinning–Allan Medal: 2017, 2018, 2019; AFL Rising Star nominee: 2007; Chris Mainwaring Medal: 2023

Shannon William Hurn (born 4 September 1987) is a former Australian rules footballer who played for the West Coast Eagles in the Australian Football League (AFL).

From South Australia, he excelled at both cricket and football at junior level, and at one stage had a rookie contract with the South Australian Cricket Association (SACA). Prior to being drafted by West Coast, Hurn played for Central District in the South Australian National Football League (SANFL), playing in premiership sides in 2004 and 2005. At West Coast, he debuted during the 2006 season, and played 333 games for the club.

Generally playing as a half-back flanker, Hurn had one of the most penetrating kicks in the AFL. He served as West Coast captain for five seasons. On 1 August 2023 he announced he would retire at the end of the 2023 AFL season. Hurn returned to the Eagles ahead of the 2025 AFL season as a development coach.

== Early life ==
Hurn hails from a sporting family; his father William Hurn played 135 games with Central District, and his grandfather Brian Hurn was a member of South Australia's 1963-64 Sheffield Shield-winning team. Hurn was born in Angaston, South Australia in the Barossa Valley and attended Angaston Primary and Nuriootpa High School. Hurn was heavily involved in school and local sporting clubs, allowing him to excel in his favourite sports: cricket and Australian rules football.

Hurn's more professional career began whilst playing his two favourite sports simultaneously. He took on a rookie contract with SACA (South Australian Cricket Association) in 2004, turning down a second one in 2005 to focus on his football. Hurn played football for Central District, making it to two premierships in 2004 and 2005. In 2005, Hurn was picked to captain the U-18 South Australian side and also picked in the U-18 All-Australian selection in football.

Hurn has a sister Ashton, who was elected to the Parliament of South Australia in 2022 and became Opposition Leader in December 2025.

== AFL career ==
Hurn was picked 13th in the first round in the 2005 draft to West Coast Eagles.

Hurn made his debut for West Coast in round 5, 2006 against the Brisbane Lions. After playing 6 games in his debut season he solidified his spot in the team, playing every game in 2007. He was nominated for the 2007 AFL Rising Star for his 19 possession performance in round 11 against Essendon.

Hurn played just six games in 2008 because of injury, in what was a poor year for the Eagles, but he rebounded to play 22 games in 2009, and 15 in 2010. In 2011, he truly established himself as an elite kick and a highly damaging player off of the half back line. He was crucial to the Eagles' success, as they rebounded from the wooden spoon the previous year to a top-four team the next. Hurn played every game, including the three finals, including 15 disposals and a goal in the nail biting semi-final win over Carlton.

In 2012, Hurn continued his strong form, playing all 24 games, including an 18 disposal and one goal effort in the Elimination Final demolition of North Melbourne. West Coast missed the finals in 2013, their lack of penetration out of the half-back line noticeable as Hurn played only 12 games.

After Darren Glass retired midway through the 2014 season, Hurn was named acting co-captain of the club for the remainder of the season, along with four other players.

On 8 December 2014 it was announced that Hurn would become the 10th captain of the West Coast Eagles.

=== Captaincy (2015–2019) ===
Hurn started out his captaincy with a highly successful first season in charge, leading West Coast to a grand final berth in 2015. The Eagles lost to Hawthorn by 46 points.

Over the next two years, Hurn continued to provide drive off halfback and through kick-ins. The club continued to reach the finals, but were defeated by the Western Bulldogs in an Elimination Final in 2016, and by Greater Western Sydney in a Semi Final in 2017.

In 2018, Hurn's form improved dramatically; in a change of role in defence, he established himself as one of the best defenders in the comp, earning a maiden All-Australian selection on the halfback flank. This coincided with a remarkable rise for West Coast, with the club expected to fall after losing a substantial amount of experience in the offseason. They made the Grand Final for the first time in three years, facing and defeating Collingwood by five points, with Hurn becoming the third premiership captain in the club's history. He and Mark LeCras were the only players from the Eagles' 2006 playing list to feature in the 2018 Grand Final, although neither he nor LeCras were selected for the 2006 Grand Final.

He continued his strong form into 2019, finishing with a second consecutive All-Australian selection, where he was named as Vice-Captain. He stepped down as captain following the 2019 season, to be replaced by Luke Shuey.

=== Retirement ===
On 1 August 2023 Hurn announced he would retire from the AFL at the end of the 2023 season.

== Honours and achievements ==
=== Team ===
- McClelland Trophy (West Coast Eagles) 2006
- AFL premiership captain (West Coast Eagles) 2018

=== Individual ===
- AFL Rising Star nominee: 2007
- 3× Glendinning–Allan Medal: 2017, 2018, 2019
- 2× All-Australian team: 2018, 2019 (vc)
- AFLPA best captain: 2019

== Statistics ==
Statistics are correct to the end of the 2023 season

Legend
G	Goals	K	Kicks	D	Disposals	T	Tackles
B	Behinds	H	Handballs	M	Marks
#	Played in that season's premiership team	†	Led the league for the season

Season	Team	No.	Games	Totals							Averages (per game)						
Season	Team	No.	Games	G	B	K	H	D	M	T	G	B	K	H	D	M	T
2006	West Coast	25	6	1	3	40	20	60	18	6	0.2	0.5	6.7	3.3	10.0	3.0	1.0
2007	West Coast	25	24	11	7	171	158	329	72	53	0.5	0.3	7.1	6.6	13.7	3.0	2.2
2008	West Coast	25	6	1	3	53	17	70	17	10	0.2	0.5	8.8	2.8	11.7	2.8	1.7
2009	West Coast	25	22	4	3	282	159	441	106	24	0.2	0.1	12.8	7.2	20.0	4.8	1.1
2010	West Coast	25	15	4	5	203	31	234	66	30	0.3	0.3	13.5	2.1	15.6	4.4	2.0
2011	West Coast	25	25	5	3	343	109	452	114	44	0.2	0.1	13.7	4.4	18.1	4.6	1.8
2012	West Coast	25	24	12	7	339	76	415	119	57	0.5	0.3	14.1	3.2	17.3	5.0	2.4
2013	West Coast	25	12	1	2	160	27	187	47	26	0.1	0.2	13.3	2.3	15.6	3.9	2.2
2014	West Coast	25	18	4	3	250	83	333	106	45	0.2	0.2	13.9	4.6	18.5	5.9	2.5
2015	West Coast	25	25	3	9	297	114	411	109	42	0.1	0.4	11.9	4.6	16.4	4.4	1.7
2016	West Coast	25	23	3	1	300	113	413	111	40	0.1	0.0	13.0	4.9	18.0	4.8	1.7
2017	West Coast	25	23	0	2	292	165	457	145	44	0.0	0.1	12.7	7.2	19.9	6.3	1.9
2018^{#}	West Coast	25	25	1	2	430^{†}	101	531	197^{†}	44	0.0	0.1	17.2	4.0	21.2	7.9^{†}	1.8
2019	West Coast	25	21	0	2	386	104	490	154	31	0.0	0.1	18.4	5.0	23.3	7.3	1.5
2020 (Note: The 2020 season was played with 17 home-and-away matches per team (down from 22) and 16-minute quarters with time on (down from 20-minute quarters with time on) due to the impact of the COVID-19 pandemic.)	West Coast	25	17	0	0	205	66	271	87	26	0.0	0.0	12.1	3.9	15.9	5.1	1.5
2021	West Coast	25	15	0	0	260	67	327	103	24	0.0	0.0	17.3	4.5	21.8	6.9	1.6
2022	West Coast	25	19	0	0	356	80	436	143	33	0.0	0.0	18.7	4.2	23.0	7.5	1.7
2023	West Coast	25	13	0	0	202	70	272	70	25	0.0	0.0	15.5	5.4	20.9	5.4	1.9
Career			333	50	52	4569	1560	6129	1783	604	0.2	0.2	13.7	4.7	18.4	5.4	1.8
