= Barossa Light & Gawler Football Association =

Australian rules football competition

- Sport: Australian rules football
- Founded: 1987
- President: Mick Brien
- No. of teams: 9
- Country: Australia
- Most recent champion: South Gawler (2026)
- Most titles: Nuriootpa Rover (9 premierships)
- Sponsor: Corryton Burge
- Related competitions: SANFL

The Barossa Light & Gawler Football Association, more commonly referred to as the BL&GFA, is an Australian rules football competition based in the Barossa Valley, Gawler Region and Light Region of South Australia, Australia. Just 42 kilometres north of the state capital of Adelaide, the BL&GFA is an affiliated member of the South Australian National Football League. In 2026, the South Gawler Lions secured their fortieth premiership overall and their sixth in the BLGFA. The current president of the League is Mick Brien and the major sponsor of the league is the Grant Burge Winery.

== Clubs ==
=== Locations ===
Locations of the Barossa Light & Gawler FA clubs

=== Current ===
Club	Colours	Nickname	Home Ground	Former League	Est.	Years in BLGFA	BLGFA Senior Premierships	
Club	Colours	Nickname	Home Ground	Former League	Est.	Years in BLGFA	Total	Years
Angaston		Panthers	Angas Recreation Park, Angaston	B&LFA	1879	1987-	1	2003
Barossa District		Bulldogs	Barossa Park, Lyndoch	HFL	1979	1991-	6	2006, 2007, 2012, 2013, 2016, 2017
Freeling		Redlegs	Freeling Football Oval, Freeling	B&LFA	1890	1987-	1	1994
Gawler Central		Tigers	Gawler Oval, Gawler	G&DFL	1889	1987-	4	1991, 2001, 2014, 2020
Kapunda		Bombers	Dutton Park, Kapunda	B&LFA	1866	1987-	2	2004, 2005
Nuriootpa Rover		Tigers	Centennial Park Oval, Nuriootpa	B&LFA	Late 19th century	1987-	9	1995, 1996, 1997, 1998, 2000, 2015, 2018, 2022, 2025
South Gawler		Lions	Eldred Riggs Reserve, Evanston	G&DFL	1889	1987-	6	1990, 1992, 1993, 2021, 2023, 2026
Tanunda		Magpies	Tanunda Recreation Park, Tanunda	B&LFA	1908	1987-	8	1987, 1989, 2002, 2008, 2009, 2010, 2011, 2019
Willaston		Donnybrooks	Elliot Goodger Memorial Reserve, Willaston	G&DFL	1889	1987-	3	1988, 1999, 2024

=== Women's only ===
Club	Colours	Nickname	Home Ground	Former League	Est.	Years in BLGFA	BLGFA Senior Premierships		Notes
Club	Colours	Nickname	Home Ground	Former League	Est.	Years in BLGFA	Total	Years	Notes
Light		Wheaties	Dutton Park, Kapunda and Freeling Football Oval, Freeling	–	2022	2022-	0	-	Merged women's team of Freeling and Kapunda

== Former clubs ==
Club	Colours	Nickname	Home Ground	Former League	Est.	Years in BLGFA	BLGFA Senior Premierships		Fate
Club	Colours	Nickname	Home Ground	Former League	Est.	Years in BLGFA	Total	Years	Fate
Eudunda		Roosters	Truro Oval, Truro	B&LFA	1893	1987-1992	0	-	Moved to North Eastern FL in 1993
Riverton Saddleworth Marrabel United		Hawks	Riverton Oval, Riverton	B&LFA	1976	1987-1998	0	-	Moved to North Eastern FL in 1999

== History ==
The Kapunda Football Club is one of the oldest football clubs in the world to enjoy an uninterrupted identity. It was first originated by copper miners in 1866, while nearby the Gawler Football Club soon formed in 1868. These two clubs sent delegates to a meeting of 13 clubs which formed the South Australia Football Association in 1877. Even though they didn't compete in the SAFA competition at first, they played invitational fixtures against visiting senior clubs from Adelaide.

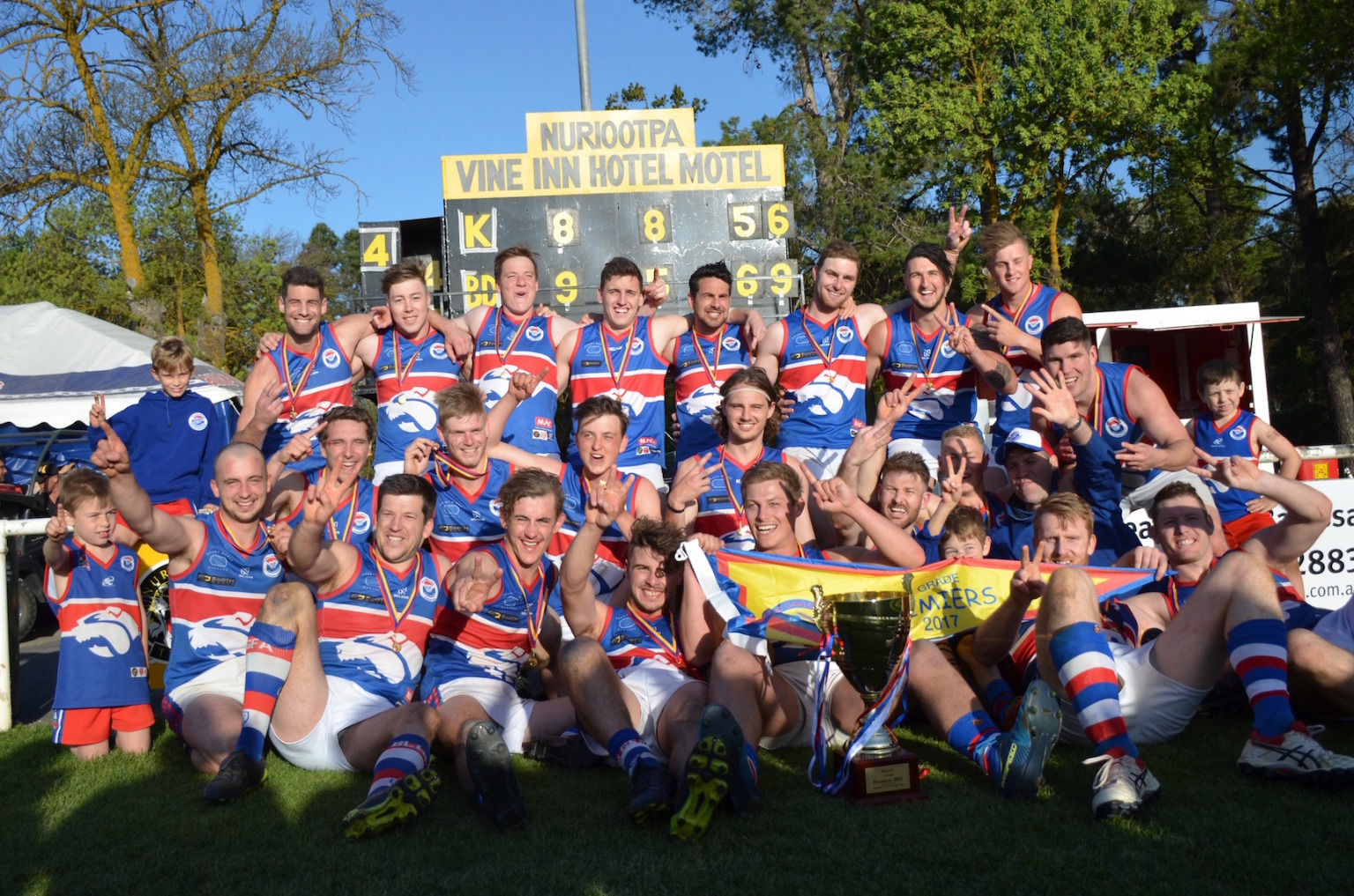
The Barossa District 2017 Premiership Team

In 1894, Kapunda formed an informal association with Angaston, Kapunda North, Greenock and Truro, most likely a precursor to the Barossa and Light Football Association which Kapunda later helped establish.

=== Gawler Football ===
The first football club in Gawler was formed in 1868. In 1877 it was a foundation club of the South Australian Football Association (later renamed SANFL).

In 1880, a number of distinct new junior clubs were also formed in Gawler – Albion, Athenian and Havelock. Seven years later, the original senior Gawler and junior Albion clubs merged to form a senior club bearing the name of Gawler Albion. This club was admitted with full senior status to the South Australian Football Association for the 1887 Season. In 1890, after four seasons in the SAFA, the Gawler Football Club left what is now the South Australian National Football League (SANFL) – but a 'junior' club competition created in 1889 in the Gawler area to feed this main 'senior' club remained, to become the Gawler Football Association which initially consisted of 3 clubs - Gawler Centrals, Gawler South and Willaston.

The Gawler Junior Football Association was formed on 23 April 1889 by founding clubs Gawler Central, Gawler South and Willaston. Teams from Church Hill, Gawler South and Willaston had actually been playing each other in scratch matches around Gawler as early as 1885, 1886 and 1887 – long before the GJFA. Church Hill was most likely the genesis of Gawler Central. And at times Willaston and South would even combine to play the main Gawler side who participated in the city.

In 1890 the Gawler Junior Football Association changed its name to Gawler Football Association in which later early member clubs would include Roseworthy College, Salisbury and Hamley Bridge. Throughout the twentieth century a number of transient clubs from within the town - such as Shamrocks, Rivals, Imperials, North Gawler, Rovers and Gawler Colts, along with others outside of Gawler - including Greenock, Sandy Creek, Wasleys, Roseworthy, Rurals (a unification of Roseworthy and Wasleys), One Tree Hill, Kangaroo Flat and Angle Vale, would also spasmodically compete in the GFA first and second grades.

By 1955 the GFA reached its greatest extent, becoming the giant Gawler and Districts Football League, with clubs competing in three senior divisions - Elizabeth, Elizabeth North, Gawler Central, Hamley Bridge, Lyndoch, Roseworthy, Roseworthy College, Salisbury, Salisbury North, Smithfield, Gawler South (who changed their name to South Gawler in 1957), Two Wells, Virginia, Willaston and Williamstown. Although over the next few decades, several of the more rural clubs departed for the neighbouring Adelaide Plains Football League, and following the inception of the Central District Bulldogs into the SANFL, the formation of the (now defunct) Central District Football Association saw the metropolitan clubs also eventually leave the GDFL.

=== Barossa & Light Football ===
The Barossa & Light Football Association was inaugurated in 1908 with founding clubs comprising Angaston, Freeling, Kapunda, Nuriootpa and Tanunda, followed by Eudunda in 1910. Clubs such as Hamley Bridge, Greenock, Truro and Eden Valley would also later field sides intermittently at various times over the years in the first and second competitions. During the 1950s Eudunda returned, and by the 1980s the BLFA at its greatest extent also had annexed Robertstown and Riverton-Saddleworth Marrabel United (RSMU).

=== Merger ===
In 1987 the Barossa And Light Football Association merged with the Gawler & District Football League, to form a new "super-league", the Barossa Light And Gawler Football Association - the formation clubs being Angaston, Eudunda, Freeling, Gawler Central, Kapunda, Nuriootpa, RSMU, South Gawler, Tanunda and Willaston. After participating in the Hills Football League as an interim since the demise of the GDFL, Barossa District (a merger of the original Lyndoch and Williamstown clubs of the GDFL in 1980) finally entered the BLGFA in 1991, while in 1992 Eudunda, and later RSMU in 1998, left to the North Eastern Football League.

The current BLGFA comprises nine clubs from the Gawler Town, Light Plains and Barossa Valley region considered to be the heartland of the SANFL Central District Bulldogs.

== Premierships ==
=== Year by year ===
- 1987 – Tanunda
- 1988 – Willaston
- 1989 – Tanunda
- 1990 – South Gawler
- 1991 – Gawler Central
- 1992 – South Gawler
- 1993 – South Gawler
- 1994 – Freeling
- 1995 – Nuriootpa
- 1996 – Nuriootpa
- 1997 – Nuriootpa
- 1998 – Nuriootpa
- 1999 – Willaston
- 2000 – Nuriootpa
- 2001 – Gawler Central
- 2002 – Tanunda
- 2003 – Angaston
- 2004 – Kapunda
- 2005 – Kapunda
- 2006 – Barossa District
- 2007 – Barossa District
- 2008 – Tanunda
- 2009 – Tanunda
- 2010 – Tanunda
- 2011 – Tanunda
- 2012 – Barossa District
- 2013 – Barossa District
- 2014 – Gawler Central
- 2015 – Nuriootpa
- 2016 – Barossa District
- 2017 – Barossa District
- 2018 – Nuriootpa
- 2019 – Tanunda
- 2020 – Gawler Central
- 2021 – South Gawler
- 2022 – Nuriootpa
- 2023 – South Gawler
- 2024 – Willaston
- 2025 – Nuriootpa
- 2026 – South Gawler

=== Premierships by club ===
Club	Premiers
Nuriootpa Rover	9
Tanunda	8
Barossa District	6
South Gawler	6
Gawler Central	4
Willaston	3
Kapunda	2
Angaston	1
Freeling	1

== Notable players ==
The Barossa, Light and Gawler Football Association has produced a number of AFL players since its inception. Some of these players include Shannon Hurn (West Coast Eagles) of Angaston Football Club, Sam Butler (West Coast Eagles) of South Gawler Football Club, Justin Westhoff (Port Adelaide Power) of the Tanunda Football Club, Jonathan Giles (West Coast Eagles) of Kapunda.

== Umpires ==
The Barossa, Light and Gawler Umpires Association (https://www.blgfa.com.au), commonly abbreviated to the BL&GUA, formed in 1987 when the Barossa & Light and Gawler Football Associations amalgamated, and now provides umpires for all matches within the Barossa, Light and Gawler Football Association. The Barossa, Light and Gawler Umpires Panel is based at Princes Park, Gawler. The Barossa, Light and Gawler Umpires were one of the last groups of umpires in South Australia to wear the traditional white shirts until 2022. The current coordinator of the panel is Matt Patterson, the development coach is Ryan Prentice, the fitness coach is Hudson Noack, and the current president is Adam Butcher.

== Media ==
=== Publishing and print ===
The BL&G Football Association is covered each week by various local newspapers - The Herald, which circulates in all of the towns represented in the league; The Bunyip, from Gawler; and The Leader, from Angaston. An annual Football Book is produced by The Leader and is available free from various outlets in the region. It features the season's draw, officials, rules, constitutions and a history of the league's premiers and medal winners from all grades. The Barracker is the official match-day magazine and is available to print each week from home. In 2026, a weekly show called Behind The Barrel was created. The show is hosted by the leagues commentator Louis McKenna and is produced by Filming Footy.

== Books ==
- Encyclopedia of South Australian country football clubs / compiled by Peter Lines. ISBN 9780980447293
- South Australian country football digest / by Peter Lines ISBN 9780987159199
