= Merv Shaw =

Australian rules footballer

Personal information
- Full name: Merv Shaw

Playing career
| Years | Club | Games (Goals) |
- West Torrens
| 1942-1944 | Port-Torrens | (136) |

Career highlights
- Port-Torrens premiership player (1942); 3x Port-Torrens leading goal-kicker (1942, 1943, 1944)

Merv Shaw was an Australian rules footballer for Port Adelaide and West Torrens.
