= Reginald Schumann =

Australian rules footballer

Reg Schumann
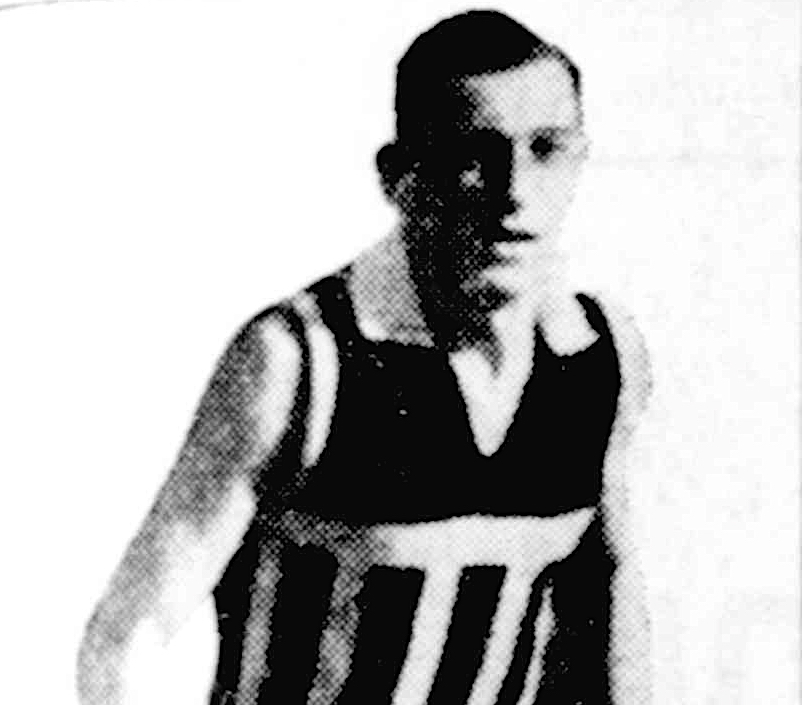

Personal information
- Full name: Reginald Schumann

Playing career^{1}
Years	Club	Games (Goals)
1939–1950	Port Adelaide	116 (0)

Representative team honours
Years	Team	Games (Goals)
	South Australia	7
- ^{1} Playing statistics correct to the end of 1950.

Career highlights
- Port Adelaide premiership player (1939)

Reginald "Reg" Schumann was an Australian rules footballer and a captain of the Port Adelaide Football Club in 1949.

Schumann played in the full back position his entire career. He made his debut for Port Adelaide in 1939, the year Port Adelaide won the premiership over West Torrens in the grand final. The next year, in 1940, Schumann was awarded Port Adelaide's best and fairest award. In 1949, he acted as captain of the club and in the Magarey Medal polled the highest votes for his club. He retired in 1950.

Over his career, he played 116 league games, all for Port Adelaide, as well as 7 games representing South Australia.
