= John Skelley =

Australian rules footballer

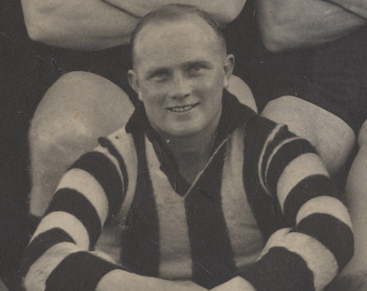

Personal information
- Full name: John Dustan Skelley
- Nickname: Jack (Bunny)
- Born: 12 November 1918; Alberton, South Australia
- Died: 4 March 1971 (aged 52); Albert Park, Adelaide

Playing career^{1}
Years	Club	Games (Goals)
1938–1946, 1949	Port Adelaide	103 (72)
- ^{1} Playing statistics correct to the end of 1949.

Career highlights
- 2x Port Adelaide premiership player (1939, 1942*); Port Adelaide best and fairest (1941)

John Dustan Skelley (12 November 1918 – 4 March 1971) was an Australian rules footballer who played for the Port Adelaide. During his career he won the clubs Best and Fairest in 1941 and two premierships, one in 1939 and another in 1942 during the WWII competition.

Prior to his football career, he served in World War II.
