= Ivor Dangerfield =

Australian rules footballer

Personal information
- Born: 16 December 1918; Pinnaroo, South Australia
- Died: 2 October 2010 (aged 91)

Playing career
Years	Club	Games (Goals)
1938-1943, 1945-1946	Port Adelaide	64 (18)

Career highlights
- Port Adelaide premiership player (1939)

Ivor Dangerfield (16 December 1918 – 2 October 2010) was an Australian rules footballer for the Port Adelaide Football Club during the late 1930s and through the 1940s.
