= Colin Aamodt =

Australian rules footballer and coach

Personal information
- Full name: Colin Ernest Aamodt
- Born: 27 June 1921; Adelaide, South Australia
- Died: 17 June 2011 (aged 89); Adelaide, South Australia

Playing career^{1}
Years	Club	Games (Goals)
1940–1941	North Adelaide	34
1942–1944	Norwood–North Adel.	25
1945–1950	North Adelaide	72 (60)

Representative team honours^{2}
Years	Team	Games (Goals)
1941	South Australia	2 (1)
Total		2 (1)

Coaching career^{3}
Years	Club	Games (W–L–D)
1955–1957	North Adelaide	53 (25–28–0)
Total		53 (25–28–0)
- ^{1} Playing statistics correct to the end of 1950.^{2} Representative statistics correct as of 1950.^{3} Coaching statistics correct as of 1957.

Career highlights
- North Adelaide Best and Fairest 1940; North Adelaide premiership player 1949

Colin Ernest Aamodt (27 June 1921 – 17 June 2011) was an Australian rules footballer who played for and coached the North Adelaide in the South Australian National Football League (SANFL). Aamodt won North Adelaide's Best and Fairest in his debut season as a 19 year old and went on to have an excellent, but interrupted by war, career with the club. Following his playing career, Aamodt took up coaching, leading Nailsworth High School to the 1952 SA Public Schools Amateur Sports Association premiership, followed by coaching North Adelaide's Senior Colts to the 1954 premiership, which led to being appointed senior coach of North Adelaide from 1955 to 1957.

Aamodt was also a professional sprinter, winning the military 100 yards championship in 1942, 75 yard and 100 yard State Championship in 1947, and finished third in the 1941 Stawell Gift.
