= 1963–64 Sheffield Shield season =

Australian cricket tournament

- Cricket format: First-class
- Tournament format: Double round-robin
- Champions: South Australia (8th title)
- Participants: 5
- Matches: 20
- Most runs: Garfield Sobers (South Australia) (973)
- Most wickets: Garfield Sobers (South Australia) (47)

The 1963–64 Sheffield Shield season was the 62nd season of the Sheffield Shield, the domestic first-class cricket competition of Australia. South Australia won the championship.

== Table ==
Team	Played	Won	1st Inns Won	Drawn	1st Inns Lost	Lost	Points
South Australia	8	4	1	0	1	2	53
Victoria	8	3	3	0	0	2	46
New South Wales	8	3	2	0	2	1	30
Queensland	8	1	2	0	3	2	14
Western Australia	8	0	1	0	3	4	4

== Statistics ==
=== Most Runs ===
Garfield Sobers 973

=== Most Wickets ===
Garfield Sobers 47
