= Mel Brock (footballer) =

Australian rules footballer (1915–2000)

Personal information
- Full name: Percival Melville Brock
- Born: 27 October 1915; Adelaide, South Australia
- Died: 28 November 2000 (aged 85); Adelaide, South Australia
- Positions: Defender, follower

Playing career^{1}
Years	Club	Games (Goals)
1932–1942	Glenelg	166 (60)
- ^{1} Playing statistics correct to the end of 1942.

Career highlights
- Premiership player 1934; Glenelg best and fairest 1935, 1940; Magarey Medal 1940; Glenelg Hall of Fame, inducted 2002

Percy Melville Brock (27 October 1915 – 28 November 2000) was an Australian rules footballer who played for Glenelg Football Club in the South Australian National Football League (SANFL) in the 1930s and 1940s, winning the Magarey Medal in 1940.

Brock was a Glenelg man to the core, he has been described as, "....a Tiger through and through. He grew up at the Bay, worshiped the local club's football stars, then went on to be worshiped himself, one of the great players to wear the black and gold."

He made his league debut with the Bays in 1932, and in 1934 played in an unforgettable against-the-odds premiership, being named amongst Glenelg's best in their defeat of Port Adelaide.

He was Glenelg's best and fairest player in 1935 and 1940, and won the most consistent player award four times. In 1940, he scored a runaway Magarey Medal triumph, polling 19 votes – 5 votes clear of runner-up Max Murdy of South Adelaide. In typically humble style, Brock said he "never entertained the thought of winning a Magarey Medal, not in my wildest dreams".

As well as being consistent, Mel Brock was highly versatile. Much of his early football was played in the backline, but later he excelled as both a follower and a rover. He played a total of 166 games, including 3 with the West Adelaide–Glenelg wartime pairing.

He retained his passion for football for the rest of his life, coaching the reserves side in the 1950s, and was a regular spectator at Glenelg matches, both home and away. Brock died in 2000.
