= Bob McLean (Australian footballer) =

Australian rules footballer (1914–1989)

Bob McLean OBE
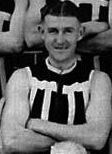

Personal information
- Full name: Allan Robert Charles McLean
- Nickname: Bob
- Born: 1 February 1914; Mile End, South Australia
- Died: 9 November 1989 (aged 75); Adelaide
- Height: 194 cm (6 ft 4 in)
- Weight: 99 kg (218 lb)
- Position: Ruckman

Playing career^{1}
| Years | Club | Games (Goals) |
| 1934–1938 | Norwood | 74 (57) |
| 1939–1948 | Port Adelaide | 147 (414) |
| 1941 | St Kilda | 3 (3) |

Representative team honours
| Years | Team | Games (Goals) |
| | South Australia | 9 |
- ^{1} Playing statistics correct to the end of 1948.

Allan Robert Charles McLean OBE (1 February 1914 – 9 November 1989) was an Australian rules footballer who played for Port Adelaide and Norwood in the South Australian National Football League (SANFL) and St Kilda in the Victorian Football League (VFL). Affectionately referred to as "Big Bob" McLean, he later became a long-serving football administrator in South Australia. He was also a good cricketer, representing South Australia in the Sheffield Shield and topped the Australian bowling and batting averages in 1947.

He was appointed an Officer of the Order of the British Empire (OBE) in the 1983 New Year Honours for service to sport.

== Football career ==
As a player, McLean was mainly a ruckman but was also handy around goals, kicking 471 of them during his 221-game SANFL career. He started out at Norwood before crossing to Port Adelaide and participating in their 1939 premiership win. On four occasions he topped Port Adelaide's goal-kicking – 1940, 1941, 1947 and 1948. His tally of 80 goals in 1947 was enough to win him the league's leading goal-kicker award. He also represented South Australia in nine interstate matches over the course of his career.

While on military service in Melbourne, he made three appearances for St Kilda in the 1941 VFL season.

== Cricket career ==
McLean, a right-handed batsman and a leg-break bowler, appeared in 20 first-class cricket matches for his state. He made 897 first-class runs at an average of 28.93 and took 65 wickets at 38.36.

Both of his two first-class hundreds were scored in a one-week period in the Sheffield Shield, towards the end of December 1949. The first was an innings of 213 which he made opening the batting against Queensland at the Adelaide Oval, dwarfing his team's next-highest score of 45. Just two days after that match ended, South Australia met Victoria at the Melbourne Cricket Ground—and McLean, opening the batting once more, scored 135 and again outshone his teammates with the next-best effort being 31. Victoria's bowling lineup consisted of Test cricketer Doug Ring as well as future Test players Jack Hill and Jack Iverson.

In his district career with Port Adelaide from 1939 to 1954, he scored over 5000 runs and took more than 500 wickets.

His first name, Allan, is given on cricket scorecards instead of Bob.

== Football administration ==
He was appointed club secretary of Port Adelaide in 1949 and remained in the job until 1980. From 1983 to 1989 he was club chairman. McLean was also a SANFL league director for 29 years and state selector for 17 years.

As a Port Adelaide administrator, Bob McLean earned a formidable reputation of making it exceptionally difficult for Victorian clubs to pry away the club's star players. A particularly famous incident in the 1970s involved St Kilda's attempt to obtain John Cahill. Bob McLean said that this was fair game but that he would "get the next flight to Melbourne and speak to Carl Ditterich (St Kilda's then captain)" if it were to happen. St Kilda reportedly cancelled their visit.

== Legacy ==
In 2007, he was inducted into the Australian Football Hall of Fame. Five years earlier he had been one of the inaugural inductees in the South Australian Football Hall of Fame.

The A. R. McLean Medal is awarded to the best-and-fairest winner for the Port Adelaide Football Club side in the SANFL each year.

His son Ian also played first-class cricket for South Australia as a batsman, playing 25 matches and scoring two centuries – against Western Australia (103 not out) and Tasmania (111).
