= Angaston Football Club =

Angaston

Names
- Full name: Angaston Football Club
- Nickname: Panthers

Club details
- Founded: 1879; 147 years ago
- Colours
- Competition: BLGFA
- Ground: Angaston Oval, Angaston

Uniforms
Home

Other information
- Official website: angastonfootballclub.com.au

The Angaston Football Club, nicknamed the Panthers, is an Australian rules football club located in Angaston, a town on the eastern side of the Barossa Valley in South Australia.

The club, established in 1879, currently plays in the Barossa Light & Gawler Football Association. Angaston was a founding member of the Barossa & Light Football Association (BLFA), predecessor of the current league, in 1908.

== Club history ==
The Angaston Football Club was officially formed in 1879, playing its first game on 12 July 1879 against the Kapunda Football Club. Kapunda won the game kicking seven goals to nil. Football was initially played in Angaston nine years prior to the club's founding, in 1870. The club took part in trying to create a football association in the late 1800s but the association wasn't formed until 18 March 1908, the "Barossa & Light Football Association". Angaston was a founding member of the league and has not missed an official season in its 139-year history.

The first official match of the Angaston Football Club was on 2 May 1908, defeating Kapunda 5.11.41 to 5.2.32. The Panthers also won their first premiership in 1908 too. In the early 1900s, Angaston won six premierships until 1915 when World War I broke out and suspended football. But success continued for the club in the 1920s as Angaston won another three premierships and continued to be regarded as one of the best teams in the league by reaching five grand finals and winning four flags in the 1930s. After their successful era of the 1930s, football was suspended again due to World War II. When the local competition started again in 1945, Angaston went on to win another premiership, defeating Kapunda in the grand final but had to wait until 1955 to win another premiership.

After their victorious 1955 season, the club suffered a thirteen-year premiership drought before winning back to back premierships in 1968 and 1969, followed by three more in 1971, 1972, and 1973 and another in 1977. The Angaston Panthers FC holds the record for being the only club to have drawn twice in a Grand Final, the first in 1969 against Nuriootpa F.C. and winning the replay and again in 1977, drawing with Kapunda and winning the replay. Angaston has won two more A-Grade premierships since 1977, in 1986 and 2003.

Angaston has produced several players that have gone on to play in the Australian Football League. These include Kent Kingsley (North Melbourne, Geelong, Richmond), Sean Tasker (Adelaide), Shannon Hurn (West Coast), Sam Colquhoun (Port Adelaide) and Jack Hannath (Fremantle).

The Angaston Football Club still continues to field junior and senior teams in the Barossa Light & Gawler Football Association and has won the most premierships in the former BLFA but have only won one premiership in the current league. Since the 2010s, the club's recent seasons have been quite tough, earning the wooden spoon in 2012, 2013 and 2017.

== A-Grade Premierships ==
- Barossa & Light Football Association (21): 1908, 1911, 1912, 1913, 1914, 1915, 1920, 1925, 1926, 1930, 1931, 1932, 1933, 1945, 1968, 1969, 1971, 1972, 1973, 1977, 1986
- Barossa Light & Gawler Football Association (1): 2003
