= Kapunda Football Club =

Names
- Full name: Kapunda Football Club
- Nickname: Bombers

2013 season
- After finals: 6th
- Leading goalkicker: Bradley Taylor
- Best and fairest: Jason McKenzie

Club details
- Founded: 1866; 160 years ago
- Colours
- Competition: Barossa Light & Gawler Football Association
- President: Matthew Ryan
- Coach: Jason McKenzie
- Captain: Matthew Holding
- Ground: Dutton Park, Kapunda

Uniforms
Home

Other information
- Official website: bombers.com.au

Kapunda Football Club, nicknamed The Bombers, is an Australian rules football club, based in Kapunda, South Australia, that competes in the Barossa Light & Gawler Football Association.

The club is currently coached by Michael McCarthy. The current president is Matthew Ryan. The club is based at Dutton Park in Kapunda. The club song is "A Bomber For You". The club fields teams in the A Grade, Reserves, Senior Colts, Junior Colts, Under 13's, under 11's and under 9's grades. The club's Bomber Blasts newspaper column features weekly during the season written by "Bomber Stud", featuring a quick review of the club's games, news and upcoming events.

== Club history ==
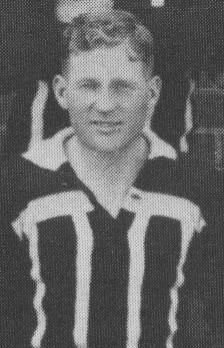
Kapunda footballer Jack Dermody in 1937

The Kapunda Football Club is one of the oldest football clubs in Australia to enjoy an uninterrupted identity. It was first formed by copper miners on 18 April 1866 in the North Kapunda Hotel, where it was unanimous that the formed club be called "The Kapunda Football Club". A pioneer of Australian Rules Football, the club played a role in the introduction of goal umpires, goal flags and the push-in-the-back rule. Kapunda was an inaugural member of the South Australian Football Association (SAFA) in 1877 but due to distance would not partake in regular matches.

The club has had many legendary players in its history, such as Jack Dermody, who won the Association Best & Fairest Medal in 1930, Dermody transferred to Port Adelaide in the SANFL where he captained Port to Premierships in 1936 and 1937 and also captained the State Team at the 1937 Australian Carnival in Perth. Dermody was involved in the introduction of Colts football to the Barossa, Light & Gawler.

Football great John "Jack" Maguire kicked more than 100 goals in a season on three occasions. In 1939 Maguire kicked the Association record of 135 goals and in 1935 kicked 30 goals in a match against Nuriootpa, including 14 goals in one quarter.

Jack Oatey Medallist and Central District Bulldogs premiership vice-captain and ruckman Jason McKenzie and former AFL player for Port Adelaide, Greater Western Sydney, Essendon and West Coast ruckman Jonathan Giles are also products of the Kapunda Football Club.

== Club events ==
The club normally begins the season with the Annual Club Player Auction on a Saturday night, which is a large fundraiser for the club. A Sunday Family Day follows, consisting of a full club light training run, barbecue, player registration and payment of subs.

Each season the club plays its neighbouring club, the Freeling Football Club for the "Mickan-Shanahan Cup", named after prominent families from Kapunda and Freeling respectively. The cup is currently held by Kapunda. The player voted Best on Ground is bestowed the "Pitman Medal", named after Mark Pitman, winner of three Mail Medals, dual Premiership Coach of Kapunda (2004-2005), Premiership player of Freeling (1994), former Central Districts and South Adelaide league player, to name a few of his footballing achievements.

The club's premier social events are the Annual Red & Rump night and formal Presentation dinner. These events are always booked out and looked forward to by those in and around the club. The club encourages all supporters to the Dutton Park clubrooms after games for best player presentations, entertainment and teas.

== Uniforms ==
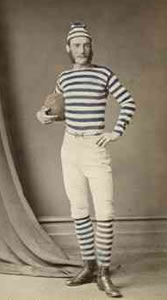
An early player of Kapunda with the first blue and white guernsey. In 1910 the club adopted its definitive colors

The Kapunda Football Club guernsey is black with a red sash. It has the club logo on the left chest and a club sponsor on the right. The club is also one of the first clubs in the Barossa, Light & Gawler competition to implement an away guernsey. This guernsey is mainly red, with a black V and black Kapunda logo. The Bombers initially had a blue and white guernsey, however in 1891 the club's colours became red and white. In 1908 the colours the blue returned to the guernsey and was shortly taken out along with the white in 1910 and the colours were now the famous black and red.

== Premierships ==
The club has been very successful on the field since their inauguration in 1866, with the A Grade winning 15 Premierships, including two runs of three in a row from 1921 to 1923 and 1927–1929. The club celebrated its first Premiership in thirty years in 2004 and went back to back in 2005 with Mark Pitman at the helm. Kapunda has played in a further 16 Grand Finals including a draw with Angaston in 1977 and the subsequent replay where they were defeated.

Year	Coach	Captain	Runner-up	Score
2005	M W Pitman	S Ryan	Freeling	Kapunda 17-14-116 Freeling 9-6-60
2004	M W Pitman	S Ryan	Angaston	Kapunda 21-16-142 Angaston 11-9-75
1974	K E Tucker	K E Tucker	Nuriootpa	Kapunda 17-13-115 Nuriootpa 10-12-72
1965	A Baraglia	A Baraglia	Nuriootpa	Kapunda 15-11-101 Nuriootpa 12-13-85
1964	A Baraglia	A Baraglia	Nuriootpa	Kapunda 13-12-90 Nuriootpa 8-11-59
1953	H C Heffernan	V Serotzki	Nuriootpa	Kapunda 11-9-75 Nuriootpa 10-12-72
1952	H C Heffernan	V Serotzki	Tanunda	Kapunda 12-12-84 Tanunda 9-9-63
1939	S Jaffer	S Jaffer	Tanunda	Kapunda 14-13-97 Tanunda 5-14-44
1935	C Palmer	T Burgess	Angaston	Kapunda 7-7-49 Angaston 6-8-44
1929	Not Listed	R Burgess	Angaston	Kapunda 9-10-64 Angaston 8-14-62
1928	Dr A Gunning	R Burgess	Angaston	Kapunda 13-12-90 Angaston 10-8-68
1927	Not Listed	H N Burgess	Angaston	Kapunda 7-17-59 Angaston 8-7-55
1923	Not Listed	P E Williams	Nuriootpa	Kapunda 8-10-58 Nuriootpa 6-13-49
1922	Not Listed	H N Burgess	Nuriootpa	Kapunda 5-4-34 Nuriootpa 3-6-24
1921	Not Listed	P E Williams	Angaston	Kapunda 5-14-44 Angaston 4-12-36

Kapunda's reserves have also won 11 Premierships since the reserves competition began in 1922, with the last in 2006. The senior colts have won a total of five premierships, the most recent in 1996, while the junior colts have won three the last of which also in 1996. Both competitions began in 1970, previous to then a combined competition known as the colts was held. Kapunda won three premierships in the colts competition.

== Association Best & Fairests and other awards ==
A Grade Association Medallists

- Bradley Taylor – 2013
- Jason McKenzie – 2012 (Tied with Sam Agars & Billy Wells of Tanunda)
- Mick McCarthy – 2004
- Jason McKenzie – 2001
- Phil Schell – 1984 and 1985
- John Baruzzi – 1974
- Jim Hayward – 1969 ( Tied with Dale John of Tanunda)
- Peter Vandeleur – 1966
- Norm O'Brien – 1959
- Vic Serotzki – 1952
- Eric Kotz – 1934
- Jack Dermody – 1930
- Bert Hawke – 1925

A Grade Association Leading Goalkickers (After minor round)

- Danny Deptula – 80 goals in 2000
- Danny Deptula – 64 goals in 1999
- Geoff Schell – 70 goals in 1987 (Tied with Anthony Mueller of Eudunda)
- Geoff Schell – 73 goals in 1986
- R.Ruediger – 60 goals in 1953
- George Goodfellow – 24 goals in 1940
- John Maguire – 123 goals in 1939
- John Maguire – 106 goals in 1937
- John Maguire – 117 goals in 1935
- Eric Kotz – 45 goals in 1932
- Eric Kotz – 67 goals in 1931
- Eric Kotz – 65 goals in 1930
- Eric Kotz – 62 goals in 1929
- Phelan – 75 goals in 1928
- Phelan – 67 goals in 1927

A Grade Rookie of the Year

- David Leslie – 2002
- Mick McCarthy – 1996

Reserves Association Medallists

- Rodney Brown – 2003
- Ben Randall – 2001
- Mark Mickan – 1999
- Bruce Pearce – 1996 and 1995
- Peter Moyle – 1988
- Terry Ryan – 1987
- Dennis Johnson – 1977 and 1976
- Oscar Abdulla – 1967
- Ray Giersch – 1957
- Bill Truscott – 1927

Reserves Association Leading Goalkickers (After minor round)

- Jarrat Farley – 39 goals in 2001
- Paul Schultz – 41 goals in 1985

Senior Colts Association Medallists

- Jay Johnson – 2003
- Corey Ryan – 2000
- John Hansen – 1986
- Jeff Bowden – 1985
- Scott Ware – 1984
- David Jarman – 1973
- Trevor Leslie – 1970

Senior Colts Association Leading Goalkickers (After minor round)

- Scott Mickan – 58 goals in 2000
- Scott Mickan – 46 goals in 1999
- Jeff Bowden – 29 goals in 1985

Junior Colts Association Medallists

- Sam Ryan – 1994
- Paul Davidson – 1981
- Russell McGregor – 1978

Junior Colts Association Leading Goalkickers (After minor round)

- Greg Mennie – 36 goals in 1984

BL&G Champion Club (Awarded to the club that is most successful over all four grades. Began in 2002)

- Kapunda – 2090 points in 2005
- Kapunda – 2325 points in 2004
