= Gawler Football Club =

Australian football club

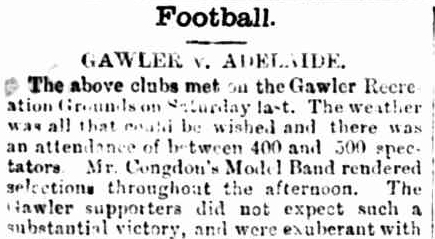

Names
- Full name: Gawler Football Club
- Former name: Gawler Albion Football Club (1880-87)
- Nickname(s): Albions (1887), Tigers

Club details
- Founded: 1868
- Dissolved: 1891 (withdrew from SAFA)
- Colours
- Competition: SAFA 1887-90; Gawler Football Association 1889–1953; Gawler and District Football League 1953–1986
- Ground: Gawler Oval

The Gawler Football Club was an Australian rules football club that was founded in June 1868 based in the township of Gawler about 39 km to the north-north east of Adelaide, South Australia.

In 1877 it was a foundation club of the South Australian Football Association (later renamed SANFL).

By 1880 the town had three additional clubs - Gawler Albion and Athenians 'junior' clubs and Havelock for juveniles; which were all playing arranged matches against visiting teams from Adelaide.

Following a merger in 1887 of the Gawler and Gawler Albions clubs, an application to the SAFA was then successful for a new senior team called Gawler Albion to join the SAFA competition. Albion was dropped from the club name the following season.

To support the new senior club with players, the Gawler Junior Football Association was subsequently formed on Tuesday 23 April 1889, comprising three local junior teams - Gawler South, Gawler Centrals and Willaston. All three clubs still exist today and since 1987 have competed in the Barossa Light & Gawler Football Association.

== Withdrawal from SAFA and attempts to rejoin ==
During the 1890 SAFA season the administrators of the Gawler association were unhappy with the SAFA programme having only been given five home games for the senior club in Gawler. They subsequently forfeited a number of games including two at Alberton against Port Adelaide, and finished bottom of the ladder with no wins and just two draws. In April 1891, the Gawler association informed the SAFA that they would not participate in the upcoming season.

The support league continued however, evolving into a senior competition and assuming the title Gawler Football Association.

Later, in 1898 the Gawler Football Association attempted to rejoin the SAFA senior competition in Adelaide; but the application was rejected at a meeting held on Monday 8 May 1899, on the grounds that a preferred electoral district football was being tried by the SAFA.

On 2 Dec 1912, after repeated lobbying the South Australia Football League granted the Gawler Football Association admission to the senior competition in Adelaide once again, with the team being named as Gawler, for the zone covered by the electoral district of Barossa – but withdrew just before the 1913 season was due to commence.

In November 1936, a group from the Gawler Football Association met again with delegates of the SANFL about a proposal to admit a team. The Barossa and Light Football Association and the Adelaide Plains Football League did not want to contribute to a combined team in league competition, but would not prevent the league from fixing the boundaries of the suggested football district to include them. It was suggested that Gawler substantiate its claim to be near league standard by sending a team to the association's Reserves for 12 months, but this was rejected by both Gawler and the SANFL.

It would take until 1959 before any Club north of Gepps Cross would again be admitted to the SANFL. Central District Football Club, which had begun to traditionally cover Gawler and the Barossa Valley was formed as an entirely new senior club – and admitted to the SANFL Reserves for five years before joining the senior ranks in 1964.

== Early history ==
At an ODDFELLOWS' and FORESTERS' picnic on Easter Monday in April 1867, which was held in the grounds of the Hon. W. Duffield, situated to the west of the Township of Gawler, football was one of the several games provided that met with a fair amount of patronage.

At a meeting of the Gawler Corporation held on Tuesday, 30 June 1868, a letter from Mr. J. C. Harris, Hon. Secretary Football Club, asked permission to erect two goals on Park Lands.

On 27 June 1868 an advertisement was placed in the Bunyip Newspaper - Gawler Football Club
Any person desirous of joining the above Club can do so by attending the next meeting, which will take place at the Commercial Hotel, on Wednesday evening, 1 July at 8 o'clock precisely, J. CHAS. HARRIS, Hon. Sec.

On Saturday 29 May 1869 on Park Lands at Gawler between 15 members of the Old Adelaide Football Club and a like number of the Gawler Club. With Adelaide winning by 3 goals to nil. Captains, Messrs. Sparks (Adelaide) and Sandland (Gawler).

On Saturday 17 July 1869 a match was played between the members of the Gawler Football Club, who mustered to the number of about 18. The sides were distinguished by the colors pink and blue, Mr. T. R. Bright being elected Captain of the pinks, and Mr. Sandland captain of the blues. The pinks kicked the first goal and afterwards two goals were kicked by the blues. The game was kept up with great spirit till about dusk.

In addition to Football the club was also involved with Athletics.

== Early interclub matches ==
On Saturday 28 August 1869, it was reported that a football match would be played in the afternoon between 15 members of the Kapunda Football Club (wearing blue), and 15 of the Gawler Club (wearing pink). The following were the list of the Gawler players:— Sandland (Captain), Messrs. R. Semple, T. R. Bright, R. Lewis, Barber, Crispe, Crump, Ferguson, Fitzgerald, Fuller, Martin, Smith, Symonds, N. Woods, and C. Harris.

On Saturday 20 August 1870, it was reported that a football match was played at Salisbury on a vacant piece of land opposite the Mill between 12 members of the Gawler Club and Woodville (who had a few Salisbury gents help made up their numbers). Gawler Captain was Mr. R.C. Sandland and Woodville's Mr. A. Crooks who scored the only goal after 1 hour of play.

== Matches against Adelaide clubs pre SAFA 1877 ==
On 23 June 1874 it was reported that at game between Gawler and Kensington Football Club at the Park Lands that went on for four hours before a crowd of hundreds that failed to reduce in number. The final score was one goal each. There was no quarrels during the game and at the end each side cheered the other.

In Aug 1874 on Prince Albert's Birthday Public a match was played at Gawler Park Lands between the local Football Club and Port Adelaide Football Club that went on for two hours and was played in great spirits. Robinson from Gawler scored the only goal. A second goal scored by Dawkins from Gawler was disputed owing to the interpretation of one of the rules.

== Matches vs SAFA clubs 1877–1880 ==
Following a successful trip to Kapunda in May 1877, the Old Adelaide Football Club played a game at Gawler on 20 June 1877. With a crowd of 400-500 spectators present the game ended in a draw - one goal each. The Gawler Captain was C. E Harris. Gawler's goal was scored by a young promising player - Fitzgerald.

On 27 May 1878 - The Queen's Birthday was a quiet day the greater part of the townspeople went to Adelaide to see the review or the races. The only thing to cause any attraction was the football match — Gawler v. Norwood, which resulted in a runaway victory for the latter of seven goals to one. They are a new club, composed of the pick of older clubs, and are the strongest team that have ever visited Gawler. The play of Dedman (captain), McMichael, Giffen, Coward, and Osborne, was splendid. The treat of seeing football well played — not a mere rough and tumble game, but good skillful play. They were entertained by the Gawlers at Thomson's Commercial Hotel and having thoroughly enjoyed the outing, returned to town by the 8 o'clock train.

At a meeting held at the institute on 20 April 1880 with a good attendance of members present it was decided that the club colours would be black and blue stripes.

In 1880, Gawler and Adelaide football clubs played their fourth annual match at Gawler, on Monday, 21 June. Great interest was displayed in the game by the Gawler people, a large number of spectators assembling to watch its progress with the visitors winning 3 goals to 1. The play on both sides was good, the Adelaides excelling in marking and kicking, whilst several of the Gawler team excelled in their running powers. After the match both teams were present at a dinner given by the Gawler Football Club at the Old Spot Hotel, Murray Street, at which Mr. H. E. Bright, Mayor of Gawler, presided. Speeches were made and toasts and songs given suitable to the occasion. The Adelaide men returned to the city by the train leaving at 8.30pm.

== Gawler Athenians and Havelock junior football clubs formation (1880) ==
A meeting to form a junior football club was held at Mr. L. J. Wilson's office, kindly lent by him for the occasion, on 19 April 1880. The club opened with twenty members. W. F. Nott, Captain; G. F. Barnet, Secretary and Treasurer. The Committee are - J. Horsfall, C. Nott, H. Wilkinson, R. Harry, and A. M. Roberts. It was decided to call the club 'Junior Athenians.'

A juvenile football club was formed in Gawler on Tuesday evening, 20 April 1880. A meeting was held in the local institute for the purpose of starting a club for the juniors, and judging from the good attendance and the enthusiasm of those present success is certain. The Gawler Havelock Football Club was the name decided on, and the following officers were appointed: — Captain, Mr. E. Bowne; vice captain, Mr. J. Norman; secretary, Mr. E. R. Hartley; treasurer, Mr. A. Harber; committee Messrs. R. Rudall, J. Morriss, F. Mankey, W. Draper; and H. Rowe.

== Gawler Albion Football Club (Pre SAFA 1880–1887) ==
A meeting with a good attendance was held at the Old Spot Hotel, on Monday 7 June 1880, for the purpose of forming a junior football club. With Mr. T. Bright in the chair the following officers were elected Captain, Mr. J. Fitzgerald, Vice - Captain Mr. T. Bright, Secretary and Treasurer Mr. E. Fitzgerald; Committee Mr. G. Simpson, J. Devine, T. Freak, and E. Summerton.

It was decided that the club be named the Gawler Albions and the colors blue jersey white knickerbockers, red caps and hose. A challenge from the South Suburban Football Club, (Adelaide) was read and accepted for 21 June 1880. The Albions being successful with one goal to nil.

In July 1880, Gawler Albions also played against Salisbury Football Club (which was their first reported match) – These two Clubs played their return match on Saturday, 26 July, on the Gawler Recreation ground. Captains - Gawler - Fitzgerald, Salisbury - O'Leary . Final Score - Gawler 9 behinds, Salisbury 1 behind.

Albion played five games (winning four) during 1881. President Mr H.E. Bright jr and Captain J. Fitzgerald. Club colours worn - red stockings and cap, blue guernsey, and black Knickerbockers.

The Gawler Albion Football Club held their first meeting for the 1885 season on Wednesday evening 15 April 1885 at the institute, Mr. E. Harker in the chair. The following officers were elected : — Patron, His Worship the Mayor Mr. L. S. Burton; President,Mr. James Martin, J.P.Vice-presidents, Messrs. J. F. Martin, L A. Plummer, Dr. Popham, J. C. Wilkinson, J.P., E. Gartrell, and J.Short; Captain, Mr. J, Fitzgerald; vice captain, Mr. .A. Harker; Secretary and Treasurer, Mr. Howard Wilkinson

Gawler Albion hosted an intercolonial team on the Exhibition Grounds against the visiting Victorian Hothams (renamed North Melbourne Football Club in 1887) which arrived by the first train of the day on Tuesday 5 May 1885. Gawler hosted the visitors for lunch at the Old Spot and the game commenced shortly before 3 pm with the Albions losing 1 goal 5 behinds to Hothams 4 goals 12 behinds before a crowd of approx 350. For the local team Fitzgerald kicked off after losing the toss, Bischof played grandly and Brown scored the only goal.

For the first time in eight years Gawler's Albion Football Club played a game against Kapunda at the Dutton Oval, Kapunda on 24 May 1886. The game being declared a draw - Albion's 10 behinds to Kapunda United's 5 behinds. Albion's best players - J. Fitzgerald (capt.), T. Cullen, W. Devine, W. Crace, and A. Ross.

Gawler Albion hosted Port Adelaide Football Club at Gawler on Saturday 29 May 1886 in a well contested game with the final scores Albion winning 3 goals 16 behinds to Ports 2 goals 13 behinds. Bischoff scoring all 3 goals for the Albions.

== Gawler Football Club (1882) ==
The effort to resuscitate the town club at Gawler has proved successful, and on Wednesday evening, 31 May 1882 a meeting was held at the Gawler Institute, when the following officers were appointed :—Patron, His Worship the Mayor (Mr. H. Dean); President, Councillor Burton; Vice-Presidents, Messrs. J. Martin, J.P., F.D. Hodge, J.P., J. F. Martin, D. W. Duffield, J.P., E. S. Burkitt, A. H. Mumme. W. F.Wincey, J.P., E. Clement, and Councillor Callaghan; Captain, J. Tardif. It was decided to play the Old Adelaide Club on the 20th inst.

Sixth Annual Game with Old Adelaide was played on the afternoon Tuesday 20 June with 500 to 600 spectators present at the Gawler Recreation Ground. Punctually at 3 o'clock His Worship the Mayor (Mr. H. Dean), patron of the Gawler Club, started the ball for the Adelaides, but before kicking off each team gave three, hearty cheers for His Worship. The game resulted in a tie with each team scoring 1 goal and 5 behinds. Captains - Tardif (Gawler) and Wyatt (Old Adelaide). After the gallant struggle with the Old Adelaide Club the Gawlers entertained the visitors at dinner at the Old Spot Hotel.

== Gawler Cricket and Football Association 1882 ==
On 14 December 1882 a meeting for the purpose of forming a Gawler Cricket and Football Association was held at the Institute Hall. His Worship the Mayor Mr. J. C. Wilkinson occupied the chair, and there were twenty-two persons present. It was resolved that a Cricket and Football Association be formed, and that a committee be formed of two members from each club represented at the meeting, for the purpose of drawing up rules to lay before a future meeting.

The following were appointed the committee pro tem :
Messrs. R. K. Thomson and W. Tribe, Gawler Cricket Club
H. Coombe and W. Ross, Union Cricket Club
J. Fitzgerald and E. R. Harry, Gawler Albion Football Club
A. Tardif and J. Thomson, Gawler Football Club
Secretary pro tem, Mr. E. W. Minchin.

It was further resolved that all Cricket and Football Clubs within a radius of twelve miles of Gawler be written to asking them to join the Association.

== Participation in the SAFA 1887–1890 ==
With the good results of the Albion Club and with the reduction of train fares for sporting teams traveling from Gawler approved (Double ticket would only be the cost of a single) further overtures locally continued regarding fielding a team from Gawler in the South Australian Football Association (now SANFL).

At a meeting held at the Gawler Institute on 2 April 1887 of over 100 footballers from the Gawler Albion and Gawler Football Clubs it was resolved that the two clubs would amalgamate and make an application to join the Adelaide Association. Following some discussion it was agreed the team would be called Gawler Albion. It was also resolved that the Club colours would be orange and black stripes.

The club was admitted at SAFA General Meeting and confirmation was received at a Gawler Albion Meeting and the following officers were elected :

- Patron, Sir J. W. Downer
- President, Hon. James Martin, M.L.C.
- Vice-presidents— Messrs. H. Bischof, E. S. Burkitt, T. Fotheringham, J.P., A. Drakard, James Short, R. J. Banter, and J. Rawlings;
- Captain, J. Fitzgerald;
- Vice-Captain, H. Bischof;
- Hon. Secretary, T. H. Willett;
- Association Secretary, B. J. Giles;
- Treasurer, A. Tardif

The Gawler "Albion" Club played its first SAFA match against the Port Adelaide Football Club at Alberton Oval in Round 1 of the 1887 Season losing 0.1 to Port Adelaide 12.28 and finished the season with one win, one draw (both against West Adelaide - no relation to the current SANFL club) from the 11 games it contested.

A summary of the SAFA 1887 Season - 11 games played - Won 1. Drawn 1, Lost 9. Scoring 14 Goals. Goalkickers:— H Bischof 3, Solomon 1, Lonsdale 1, W. Devine 3, Doherty 3, 1 May, C. Bischof 1, O. Sanderson 1

At the Annual Meeting held at Gawler Institute on 20 March 1888 it was agreed to strike out the word "Albion" from the Club name. It was also confirmed that the Gawler Football Club would remain associated with the SAFA.

At a special Meeting held at Gawler Institute on 23 April 1888, with a large attendance present, it was resolved to protest against the upcoming season programme and of the Club being excluded from playing matches on the Adelaide Oval.

A summary of the SAFA 1888 Season - - Won 2 Lost 10. Scoring 20 Goals. It was reported that the Gawler ground, was rather rough, and some of the visiting teams were loud in their objections to the telegraph posts in the centre and the bicycle track around the playing area. The post was removed during the season, and by 1889 the bicycle track will be altered. Then the Gawlers will have a nice little ground.

A summary of the 1889 Season - 11 games played - Won 4 Lost 7. Scoring 21 Goals. Goalkickers:— Thompson 6, Holbrook 5, Penny 3, C. Bischoff 1, H.Bischoff 1, Cheek 1, Miller 1, Allen 1, Darling 1, Harker 1.

At a meeting in March 1890, Mr. A. Ross was appointed Secretary and was instructed to write to the S.A.Football Association, signifying their intention to still continue in the Senior Association.

Gawler played its last SAFA game on 6 September 1890 at Gawler Oval in Round 17 of the 1890 SAFA Season against Medindie (later renamed North Adelaide in 1893) which was abandoned at half-time due to torrential rain in the second quarter and officially ended in a "draw" 0.3 to 0.1 (as only goals counted) when the Medindies refused to take to the ground after half-time due to the condition of the oval.

Despite protests from Gawler the 1890 Programme gave them only five home games (one each against the other clubs) and two away games against each of the other clubs from Adelaide and Port Adelaide. They forfeited both of their games against Port Adelaide at Alberton and ended up collecting the wooden spoon. The end of year report stated they had a good deal to put up with in the way of a badly arranged programme, for they were brought down to town Saturday after Saturday, and sometimes to play the same team on two successive Saturdays.

A summary of the 1890 Season for the Senior Club and local Junior Association was summed up as follows: The achievements of the Gawler team have not been such as to cover themselves with glory, but it is no secret that they have been placed at very great disadvantage by the Association. The action of the committee when the programme was arranged showed that there was an underhand attempt to force the local team out of the Association, and it was no wonder that there was a lack of spirit in their performances throughout the occasion. This policy of the Association was pursued right through the season, and their action in declaring the match against Adelaide off after the latter had forfeited, and in awarding a draw in the Medindie match when they (the Medindies) were clearly in the wrong, was at least consistent with their peculiar ideas of fairness. Notwithstanding this, however, the play of the Gawlers was disappointing, and is to be accounted for in a great manner to their lack of attention to training. Of the individual performers J. Thomson stands out prominently for all-round work, whilst amongst the best of the others are A. Keal, H. and C. Bischof, T. Doherty, C. Brown, Harker, Cullen, W. May, A. Ross, W. Lonsdale, and Saunderson.

== Withdrawal from SAFA 1891 ==
In April 1891, Mr W. James Secretary of the Gawler Club notified the South Australia Football Association in writing that it had no intention of joining for the upcoming season.

Despite a senior Gawler team not competing in the SAFA season after 1890 matches did continued against SAFA Clubs from Adelaide.

A match was played on Sat 11 July 1891 between the Gawler Association and South Adelaide at Gawler Oval.
Final score Gawler 1–1 to South Adelaide 13–15.

1891 - An end of Season match was played at Gawler by the 1891 SAFA Premiers Norwood vs a team of 25 from Gawler. Result - Gawler (team of 25) 6 goals 9 behinds, Norwood 5 goals 7 behinds.

1892 - A large crowd attended a match on 13 September at Gawler Recreation Ground against the 1892 SAFA Premiers South Adelaide.
Finals Scores South 8 goals 6 behinds defeated Gawler 6 goals 8 behinds. Best on ground was J.J. Thomson from Gawler.

1897 - SAFA nullified Gawler's registration (without notice)

The Gawler Football Association continued to field a representative team and organised games against other visiting clubs and Associations. It made a number of attempts over the years to rejoin the senior SAFA/SANFL competition in Adelaide all without success.

== Notable players ==
Joe Darling CBE - Future Australian Cricket Test Captain, whilst a student at Roseworthy College aged 18, played for Gawler in 1889. At age 15 he joined Adelaide from Prince Alfred College and was a member of their 1886 Premiership Team. He would join Norwood in 1894 and again be a member of a premiership team.

With the Senior Club withdrawing from the SAFA and disbanding a number of Gawler's most talented players joined Norwood Football Club in 1891 including, James Thomson and Charles Bischof.

Despite Gawler not having a senior team in the SAFA after the 1890 season players from Gawler were recruited by the other SAFA clubs.
As at 1929 the following is a list of notable players:
Norwood - J. J. Thomson, A. Thomson, N. Mitchell, B. Sheriff. P. Crump
Sturt - R. Mowat, W. Ayling, H. Allan and Arthur Limb
West Torrens - L. Prenz, J. Connolley, E. Panter, D. Davis, O. Willett
West Adelaide - J. F. McCarthy, W. Price, James Tierney (also played for West Torrens, South and North Adelaide - 1908 Margarey Medallist)
North Adelaide - F. Rusby, N. Broderick, C.Matthews, P. Doyle, W. Moyle
Port Adelaide - B. Causby
Glenelg - O. Ross
South Adelaide - A. Arthur, P. Swift, W. May, C. Adcock, H. Forgie. R. Ross, W. Broderick, A. F. May, H. Cochran, B. Cheek, R. and S. N. Beadnall, J. Fitzgerald, J. A. Harker, and H. Bischoff

In 1929 - F. Tully, W. Hebbard, and R. May, former Gawler Central players, were with South Adelaide.

== Gawler SAFA Honour Board ==
Gawler Football Club Honour Board - SAFA
Year	Position	Record (W-L-D)	Chairman (President)	Secretary	Captain	Leading Goalkickers Best & Fairest (Silver Cup)
1887	6th	1-9-1	A. Drakard	T.H.Willett	J.Fitzgerald	H.Bischof, W.Devine, Doherty (3 goals each); Best Player - Devine
1888	6th	2-10-0	Mayor L.S.Burton	Charles Bischof	H.Bischof	T. Bright (4 goals), H.Bischof (3 goals). J.Thomson (Awarded Best All Round Player)
1889	4th	4-7-0	G. W. B. Croft	C.Bischof	R.Burton	J.Thomson (6 goals) Holbrook (5 goals); James Thomson (Awarded Best All Round Player -2nd year in a row)
1890	6th (Wooden Spoon)	0-12-2	G. W. B. Croft	A.Ross	A.Ross	J.Thompson (3 goals)

== Gawler Football Association ==
19 Mar 1889 - A meeting was held at the Gawler Institute in the evening for the purpose of forming a Junior Club, and also to co-operate with the Willaston and Gawler South Clubs in forming an Association. It was decided to form an club to be called the " Gawler Central Club." Mr. R, H. Barnet was appointed captain, Mr. J. W. Doherty vice-captain, Meesrs. Porter, Cheek, Morris, and McMamara committee; Messrs. Barnet, Doherty, and Porter Match Committee.

The question of forming a Junior Association was then discussed, and Messrs. Ross, Doherty, and Barnet were appointed delegates to meet those from the other clubs.

The Gawler Junior Football Association was formed on Tuesday 23 April 1889 by delegates from the following three clubs - Gawler South, (Gawler) Centrals and Willaston. All three of these Gawler based clubs still exist and now play in the Barossa Light & Gawler Football Association.

1890 - Gawler Souths changed their colours to Blue and White.
1891 - Gawler Centrals colours were orange and black.

12 May 1897 - Roseworthy Agricultural College, which is located 10 km North West of Gawler, joined the Gawler Football Association to create a four team competition.

=== Gawler Football Association placings 1889–1899 ===
1889 Willaston first (6 wins 1 draw 1 lost), South second (2 wins 2 draw 5 lost), Centrals third (1 win 3 draw 4 lost)
1890 Gawler Centrals first - Won 7 Drawn 1 Lost 0 (15 pts), second - South Gawler Won 2 Drawn 3 Lost 3 (7 pts), third - Willaston Won 0 Drawn 2 lost 6 (2 pts)
1891 Gawler South
1892 Gawler Centrals
1893 Gawler Centrals and South Gawler Tied with no playoff

1894 Gawler South
1895 Gawler Centrals, 2nd - South Gawler
1896 Willaston 1st, South 2nd, Centrals 3rd (Last)
1897 Willaston first
1898 Gawler Centrals first, Willaston second, South Gawler, college
1899 Gawler South first

=== Gawler Football Association 1900–1941 ===
On Wednesday 25 April 1900 - The old Gawler Football Association having been dissolved, a meeting was held in the evening, when three clubs were represented. It was resolved to form a new Association. It was stated that in all probability the College Club would join, the students being away at present. A committee was appointed to frame rules and bring them up at the next meeting.

On Thursday 3 May 1900, at a meeting held at the St. Joseph's School room of approximately 50 Gawler Irishmen, it was resolved "That a club, consisting exclusively of Irishmen, be formed, to be called the Gawler Shamrock Football Club." The colours decided upon were blue stockings, knickers and guernseys, with green hoop.

In 1900 a match was played at Gawler against the Adelaide and Suburban Association and it was hoped that this would become an annual event.

1901 South Gawler Won 9 Lost 0, second Centrals Won 5 lost 4, third Willaston Won 4 Lost 5, fourth Shamrocks Won 0 Lost 9

April 1903 - At the Annual General Meeting a letter was received from the Shamrock Club informing the Association that they had disbanded.

In 1904 on 23 June, Gawler 7 goals 9 behinds defeated an interstate Juniors team from Victoria 2 goals 8 behinds. It was reported there was a good attendance of spectators at the Gawler Recreation Oval.

1911 - Salisbury Football Club joined the Gawler Association for the first time. The season ended in controversy when Gawler South were accused of deliberately losing in the last round to Willaston therefore preventing Salisbury from qualifying for the Finals. Gawler South were initially disqualified at meeting by 9 votes to 4. However, on Appeal were reinstated. Gawler South defeated Willaston to take the Premiership.

On 13 May 1911, Gawler hosted SAFL Club West Torrens losing 5 goals 6 behinds (36) to 10 goals 16 behinds (76). James Tierney the 1908 Magarey Medalist was one of the best players for Gawler. Tierney from Gawler had played ruck for South Australia and 4 SAFL Clubs (West, South and North Adelaide and West Torrens) between 1901 and 1911.

1912 - When Mr E Johns Senior a delegate from North Adelaide was transferred to Gawler by the Postal Department he was soon elected to chairman and was instrumental in the Association applying for admission to the South Australia Football League.

On 2 Dec 1912, the South Australia Football League granted Gawler admission to the senior competition in Adelaide as the eighth Club for the zone covering the Electoral District of Barossa. Its colors were registered as follows: Black jersey with pink hoop, white knickers and black-and-pink hose. However, just before the start of the 1913 season withdrew due to loss of a number of prominent players from the District and the depressed condition of the sport locally.

1919 - Following the end of WW1 competition resumed on 3 May with the following 5 clubs - Gawler Centrals, South Gawler, Willaston, Roseworthy College and Salisbury.

Gawler South dominance (Premiers for six years in succession)

1924 - On 18 Oct a match organised by Sports and Games Committee of Adelaide was played between the Gawler Association and a team of Aborigines from Murray and Point Pearce stations at Jubilee Oval (Adelaide). The aboriginal team won a good game of football by 12.19 to 10.17.

1926 - There was no A grade competition following College's withdrawal to join an inter-collegiate competition with Schools in Adelaide and Salisbury who had been dissatisfied for the last couple of season joining the Prospect District. An attempt was made to have two Gawler A grade teams (South and Centrals) compete in Barossa and Light Association but it failed with only the Angaston delegates voting in favour. There was a fear that a single Gawler Team would be too strong and two teams meant additional travel to Gawler for the Barossa teams. However, there was a B grade competition with six clubs that competed with a rule that no A grade players were permitted to prevent packing of any team - South Gawler, Rovers, Centrals, Willaston, Roseworthy College and Lyndoch.

1927 - Following several suggestions including separate districts from which teams are to be chosen or a combined Gawler team to compete in Barossa and Light Association the Competition consisted of 5 clubs - Gawler Centrals, South, Rovers, Lyndoch and Willaston. However, Lyndoch did not particapte. Gawler Rovers team consisting of young men from Gawler South. Hamley Bridge also joined the Association and collected the Minor Premiership with 10 wins from 12 games. In the First Semi-Final - Gawler Centrals defeated Hamley Bridge. As minor premiers, Hamley Bridge enjoyed the right of challenge. Grand Final Challenge - Gawler South defeated Hamley Bridge.

1929 - A Grade Competition had expanded to seven teams with Williamstown joining and changing their name to Lyndoch-Williamstown. Hamley Bridge left to rejoin Gibert Football Association and Salisbury rejoined. The teams being Gawler Central, Gawler Rovers, South Gawler, Roseworthy College, Salisbury, Willaston, Williamstown-Lyndoch.

Salisbury Football Club which was founded in 1880 was affiliated with Gawler Association from 1929 to 1933 and 1936 to 1937.

1935 - Letters in Bunyip paper suggesting to scrap the B League and for the Association to have three teams supporting a supreme team from Gawler representing the Association in the SAFL

1936 - A deputation from the Gawler Football Association proposal to admit a team to SANFL was rejected by the league on the grounds of costs to the other clubs and that the question of Gawler's admission be held in abeyance for a year.

1937 - Salisbury joins Lower North Association (other teams in this Association - Angle Vale, One Tree Hill, Virginia)

1938 - Roseworthy College after 25 years won their first premiership since 1913. C. Haines from the College Team won the Drop kick competition with a distance of 66yards 2feet, 3inches (over 60 meters).

1939 - Gawler District Football was trialled with 4 teams (Gawler South, Central, Roseworthy College and Willaston) and it was agreed to continue with it in 1940.

Gawler Rovers joined the Lower North Association becoming premiers in 1939 and 1940 defeating Virginia. (other teams in the league Salisbury, Smithfield and Two Wells)

1941 - Rovers (colours Black and White) rejoined the Gawler Football Association which decided not to affliliate with the SANFL.

Competition continued until the 1941 season when it was suspended due to World War II.

1942 - On 13 April Football Competition went into recess for the duration of World War 2.

== List of Gawler Football Association Premiers and Grand Finals 1900–1941 ==
1900 Gawler Centrals
1901 South Gawler
1902 South Gawler 2nd Willaston (other teams Centrals and Shamrocks)
1903 Willaston 8 goals 13 behinds (61) defeated Centrals 5 goals 11 behinds (41)
1904 Gawler Centrals
1905 Gawler Centrals 10.6 (66) defeated Gawler South 7.10 (52)
1906 South Gawler 5.7 (37) defeated Gawler Centrals 3.13 (31)
1907 South Gawler
1908 College
1909 South Gawler
1910 South Gawler
1911 South Gawler defeated Willaston
1912 College 8 goals 2 behinds (50) defeated South Gawler 6 goals 12 behinds (48)
1913 College 9 goals 12 behinds (66) defeated South Gawler 7 goals 8 behinds (50)
1914 Gawler Centrals 9.6 (60) defeated Salisbury 4.7 (31)
1915 Willaston
1916–1918 No competition due to WW1
1919 Gawler Centrals
1920 South Gawler
1921 South Gawler
1922 South Gawler
1923 South Gawler
1924 South Gawler

1925 Gawler South
1926 No A Grade Competition. B Grade Competition with 6 teams.
1927 Gawler South 12–18 (90) defeated Hamley Bridge 6-9 (45)
1928 Willaston
1929 Gawler South (9 goals 10 behinds) defeated Salisbury (4 goals 10 behinds)
1930 Willaston
1931 Gawler South
1932 Gawler South
1933 Willaston
1934 Gawler South
1935 Willaston 14-15 defeated South Gawler 13-14
1936 Gawler Centrals
1937 Willaston (10 goals 9 behinds) defeated Centrals (5 goals 9 behinds)
1938 Roseworthy College (14 goals 13 behinds) defeated Centrals (11 goals 14 behinds )
1939 Willaston
1940 Roseworthy College (6 goals ? behinds) defeated Willaston (3 goals ? behinds )
1941 Willaston 16 goals 11 behinds (107) defeated Roseworthy College 10 goals 4 behinds (64)

=== Gawler Football Association 1946 to 1950 ===
On Monday 15 February 1946 a public meeting was held to discuss resumption of football post World War 2. The meeting was chaired by Mr. E.J.Foord who expressed his pleasure at having present the Gawler Football Association President Mr. W. Antwis and Mr. V. Paternoster, a member of the Oval Advisory Committee, as well as so many other enthusiasts. The chairman also offered apologies for Mr. Duncan, M.P., who was unable to attend, but who assured Gawler Football of his help and support.

Representatives of Roseworthy College, Willaston, Gawler South, and Gawler Rover Clubs, who were all members of the Gawler Football Association in the last year of active football (1941) expressed their Clubs' desires to continue in the Association. Delegates from the Gawler Colts Club expressed their wish to keep its club intact and affiliate with the Association. Gentlemen from Kangaroo Flat were hopeful that that district would be able to form a club to compete in the 1946 football competition, and that they had a prospective oval in view. A recommendation was made that the Colts and Kangaroo Flat Clubs be asked to join the Football Association. In reply to a question, Mr. J. McLcod said he was holding the property of the Central Club, which had been one of the affiliated clubs for many years, and he was confident that Centrals would not field a team. A further recommendation was made that the Association affiliate with the S.A. National Football League.

On 8 March 1946, Mr. E. J- Foord, Chairman of the Gawler Football Association for 14 years, was succeeded by Mr. M.G. Best .
Kangaroo Flat decided not to enter a team in the 'A' Grade competition but instead competed in the B Grade.
It was reported that football would resume on 27 April.
A Grade Teams - Gawler South, Colts, Rovers (colours - Black and White), Roseworthy College, Sandy Creek, Willaston
B Grade Teams - Gawler South, Kangaroo Flat, Roseworthy College, Smithfield, Virginia, Willaston
During the year Football matches were also organised between the various Hotels in Gawler - Criterion, Gawler Arms, Commercial Hotel and the Railway Hotel.

1946 Grand Final - Willaston 17 goals 15 behinds defeated College 7 goals 5 behinds. Crowd 700. Len Nelson of Sandy Creek won the best and fairest for the season. All the B Grade Finals were played at Virginia - 1st Semi Virginia and Willaston. 2nd Semi Smithfield and College.

1947 - District System for Gawler Association. The GAWLER FOOTBALL ASSOCIATION decided to reorganise the club system and play teams chosen from players resident in stipulated areas for the 3 Gawler Clubs. With the North and South Para rivers as district boundaries one team will comprise players between the two rivers (central district), another team will come from residents beyond the South Para (southern district) and the third team from beyond the North Para (northern district). The Roseworthy College and Sandy Creek teams remained in the Association, but Salisbury had notified its intention to play in the East Torrens Association instead of Gawler. The Virginia Club was invited to join the Association to make the number of six teams.

Friday 9 May 1947 - Rover Football Club wound up with dinner held in the Gawler Arms Hotel with fifty members present. The club donated its jerseys and equipment to the High School.

1948 - Premiers Willaston. Other Clubs - Centrals, South, college and Virginia.

1949 Salisbury rejoined to form a 6 team competition.
The A grade teams being South Gawler, Gawler Central, Willaston, Roseworthy College, Virginia and Salisbury.

=== Gawler and District Football Association 1951 to 1952 ===
1951 - A and B Grade Associations amalgamated under the name of Gawler and District Football Association
A Grade - College, Willaston, Gawler South, Gawler Central, Salisbury and Virginia
B Grade - College, Willaston, Gawler South, Gawler Central, Salisbury, Two Wells.

=== Gawler and District Football League 1953 to 1986 ===
In 1953, the Association was renamed Gawler and District Football League at the request of the SANFL. This was to distinguish it from soccer which is commonly called known as Association football.

Applications for affiliation from Lyndoch (A Grade), Roseworthy (B Grade) and Smithfield (B Grade) were accepted. Virginia applied for a transfer from A to B Grade.

Teams therefore for the renamed expanded League became: A Grade - Gawler South, Gawler Central, Willaston, college, Salisbury and Lyndoch ( 6 teams)

B Grade - Gawler South, Gawler Central, Willaston, college, Salisbury, Virginia, Smithfield, Roseworthy, Two Wells (9 teams)

1954 Salisbury North joined the A Grade whilst Lyndoch moved to the B Grade.

1961 Salisbury, Salisbury North, Elizabeth, Elizabeth North withdraw from the Gawler and District Football League and joined the Central District Football Association along with Central District and Two Wells-Virginia.

Lyndoch Football Club reformed again in 1960. They won the 1965 premiership beating Gawler 8.7.55 to 7.9.51 at Gawler Oval. However, that would be their last ever flag, despite grand final appearances in 1966, 1972, 1974 and 1978. The club merged with Williamstown Rovers the following year after the 1979 season. They now also compete in Barossa Light & Gawler Football Association with the 3 Gawler Clubs - Gawler Central, South Gawler and Willaston.

== List of Gawler and District Football League Premiers and Grand Finals 1946–1986 ==
1946 Willaston
1947 Willaston
1948 Willaston 11.9 defeated South Gawler 5.5
1949 Roseworthy College 10.11 defeated Willaston 7.7
1950 Roseworthy College 11.12 defeated Gawler Centrals 4.9
1951 Roseworthy College defeated Willaston
1952 Gawler South
1953 Gawler Centrals defeated Gawler South
1954 Gawler South
1955 Gawler South
1956 Salisbury defeated South Gawler (21pts)
1957 Salisbury defeated South Gawler (20pts)
1958 Elizabeth defeated South Gawler
1959 Roseworthy College
1960 South Gawler 7.11 (53) def Elizabeth 4.11 (35)
1961 Willaston
1962 Roseworthy (Township) 17.17 (119) defeated Willaston 8.7 (55)
1963 South Gawler 10.12 (72) def Gawler Central 9.3 (57)
1964 Roseworthy (Township) 7.15 (57) defeated Hamley Bridge 5.3 (33)
1965 Lyndoch 8.7.55 defeated Gawler Central 7.9.51
1966 Roseworthy College
1967 South Gawler defeated Hamley Bridge
1968 Hamley Bridge 11-7 defeated South 10-11
1969 South Gawler
1970 South Gawler
1971 Roseworthy College
1972 Willaston
1973 Roseworthy College
1974 South Gawler
1975 Two Wells
1976 Two Wells
1977 Two Wells
1978 Willaston
1979 South Gawler. South Gawler and Gawler Central drew 21.16 (142). Replay South Gawler won by 13 points.
1980 Willaston
1981 Two Wells
1982 Barossa District 16-21 (117) defeated Gawler Central 9-10 (64)
1983 Gawler Centrals 17-15 (117) defeated Willaston 16-11 (107)
1984 Virginia 14.14 (98) defeated Two Wells 11.15 (81)
1985 Willaston 27.17 (179) defeated Gawler Central 13.10 (88)
1986 South Gawler 20.14 (134) defeated Gawler Central 18.9 (117)

== Gawler Football A Grade premierships by club ==
Club	Colours	Premierships	Runners-up	Top Two Finish	Premiership Season
South Gawler		33			1891,1893*,1894,1899,1901,1902,1906,1907,1909,1910,1911,1920,1921,1922,1923,1924,1925, 1927,1929,1931,1932,1934,1952,1954,1955,1960,1963,1967,1969,1970,1974,1979,1986
Willaston		20			1889,1896,1897,1903,1915,1928,1930,1933,1935,1937,1939,1941, 1946,1947,1948,1961,1972,1978,1980,1985.
Gawler Central		13			1890,1892,1893*,1895,1898,1900,1904,1905,1914,1919,1936,1953,1983
Roseworthy College		12			1908,1912,1913,1938,1940,1949–1951,1959,1966,1971,1973
Two Wells		4			1975–1977,1981
Roseworthy (Township)		2			1962,1964
Salisbury		2			1956,1957
Barossa District		1			1982
Elizabeth		1			1958
Hamley Bridge		1			1968
Lyndoch		1	4	5	1965 (Runner Up 1966,1972,1974,1978)
Virginia		1			1984

Notes:
1893 Gawler Central and South Gawler declared Joint Premiers as no playoff was arranged
1916–1918 No competition due to WW1
1926 There was no A grade competition following Roseworthy College's withdrawal to join an inter-collegiate competition with Schools in Adelaide and Salisbury who had been dissatisfied for the last couple of season joining the Prospect District.
1942–1945 No competition due to WW2

=== Merger with Barossa and Light Association ===
The Gawler and District Football League merged with the Barossa and Light Association (Founded in 1934) for the 1987 Season to form the Barossa Light & Gawler Football Association which consists of 9 teams.

== Association Best and Fairest (incomplete) ==
Gawler Football Association
1912 Mail Medal – Winky Price (South Gawler)
1923 P.J. Broderick Medal – H. Bentley / A.R. May (South Gawler)
1927 P.J. Broderick Medal – P. Baldwin (South Gawler)
1936 Mail Medal – Eddie Mahoney (South Gawler)
1937 Mail Medal – Eddie Mahoney (South Gawler)
1938 Mail Medal – Eddie Mahoney (South Gawler)
1941 W. Wiles Trophy – M. Williams (South Gawler)
1947 Page Trophy – Bob Gordon (South Gawler)
1948 Page Trophy – Bob Gordon (South Gawler)
Gawler and District Football League
1954 Mail Trophy – Stan Edmonds (South Gawler)
1957 Mail Trophy – John Nottle (South Gawler)
1963 Mail Trophy – Dean Clark (South Gawler)
1970 Mail Trophy – Xavier Sibenaler (South Gawler)
1975 Mail Trophy – Mick Daly (South Gawler)
1976 Mail Trophy – Kym Stoddard (South Gawler)
1983 Bunyip Medal – Graham Schultz (South Gawler)

== Gawler clubs in Barossa Light & Gawler Football Association ==
The below three Gawler Football Clubs established in 1889 all still exist and now compete in the 9 team Barossa Light & Gawler Football Association since 1987.

== Gawler football clubs ==
Colors	Club	Nickname	Location	Website
	Gawler Central	Tigers	Gawler	https://www.gcsc.com.au//
	South Gawler	Lions	Gawler South	https://www.southgawlerfc.com//
	Willaston	Donnybrooks	Willaston	https://willastonsportingclubs.com.au/willaston-football-club//

Footnote - South Gawler competed in Adelaide Plains Football League for two seasons 1961–1962 (winning the 1961 Premiership) before rejoining the Gawler Association.

== Notable players ==
James Tierney - originally from Willaston played a total of 114 games between 1901–1912 for West Adelaide; West Torrens; South Adelaide; North Adelaide in the SAFL and was the 1908 Magarey Medalist. He also represented South Australia 9 times.

David Window played one season for the Norwood Football Club in 1932. He had been a member of a Willaston premiership team in 1930 in the Gawler Association. Window resumed his career with Willaston in 1933. In May of that season he was injured shortly after the start of the Willaston versus Gawler South match at Gawler and was taken to hospital. He played again soon after, won another flag with the club later that year, and continued with Willaston for several more seasons. His brother Clarence played league football for Glenelg, and his nephew Gary won a Magarey Medal in 1965 playing for Central District.

Sonny Morey - originally from Gawler Centrals. Joined Gawler Central Football Club at age 15, winning the under 17's and senior best-and-fairest awards. Recruited to the new SANFL club Central District two weeks before his 19th birthday. He was a member of their first league team in 1964 and having the first kick. First Central District's player to play over 200 SANFL league games and upon retirement in 1977 the last remaining player from the first team. Runner up in the 1972 Margarey Medal to Malcolm Blight. He also represented South Australia 4 times and was inducted into SA Hall of Fame in 2023.

== Gawler and Districts Football Association-affiliated non-Gawler-based clubs (historical) ==
Roseworthy Agricultural College joined on 12 May 1897 and competed in the Gawler Competition until 1960. For the seasons 1961–1963 and 1985–1996 the College joined the Adelaide Plains Football League before becoming absorbed by Adelaide University in 1997.

Hamley Bridge 1910, 1927–1929, 1964–1983. In 1984 rejoined the Adelaide Plains Football League.

Roseworthy
The 'Roosters' wearing red and white were formed in the 1920s as a B-Grade side in the Gawler & District Football League. The club played on an oval across from Leitch’s Roseworthy Hotel, which was abandoned in the early 1960s due to the State Government realigning Main North Road (Horrocks Highway). After winning the 1962 Grand Final the club would only exist for another 3 years after this win, merging with Wasleys Football Club to form ‘Rurals’ for a short time.

Virginia 1920–1925, 1932–1935, 1946–1958, 1981–1986

Two Wells 1948–1958, 1975–1986

Two Wells Virginia 1959–1960, 1974

Notes: Two Wells joined the Gawler & District Football Association from the Adelaide Plains Association . Between the 1960s and 1980s the Two Wells Football Club moved between the Central Districts Football Association, Adelaide Plains Football League and the Gawler & District League. During this time a Two Wells-Virginia team was established participating together for the 15 years up until 1975.

Sandy Creek 1946–1947
Moved to Lower North Football Association (now defunct)

Salisbury Football Club 1949–1960.
Salisbury left the league in 1961 to join the newly formed Central District Football Association. The Salisbury Magpies now compete in the Adelaide Footy League.

Salisbury North 1954–1960.
The Club was formed in 1954 and among those involved were brothers Les and Clarrie Window (Clarrie being the father of SANFL 1965 Magary Medalist Gary Window who played for the club as a junior). Salisbury North transferred to the Central Districts Football Association in 1961. The Salisbury North Hawks now compete in the Adelaide Footy League.

Elizabeth North 1955–1960
In 1961 joined Central District Football Association (now Northern Metropolitan Football League) winning the 1964 Premiership. Club is now defunct.

Elizabeth 1956–1960.
In 1956 Elizabeth Football Club was formed and based at Ridley Reserve, Elizabeth. They entered the Gawler & District Football League B-Grade competition, taking out the premiership in the club’s first year. They were then promoted to the A-Grade competition, and took out the 1958 G&DFL Premiership defeating South Gawler Football Club. Elizabeth then left the league in 1961 to join the newly formed Central District Football Association. which in 1988 was renamed the [[Northern Metropolitan Football League}]]. In 1995, the Elizabeth Eagles joined the Adelaide Footy League.

Williamstown Rovers had two stints in the Gawler & District Football League around the club going into recess and returning from the Hills Football League. 1962–1963 and 1974–1979 after moving from the Hills League before the merger with Lyndoch.

Barossa District Football Club was formed on 7 November 1979 following the amalgamation of the Williamstown Rovers Football Club and the Lyndoch Football Club playing in the Gawler and District League. The Barossa District Football Club was named after the Local Council Area wearing a new Guernsey with colours of blue with a red and white V and the Barossa Bulldogs logo.
