= Edward Grundy =

Australian politician

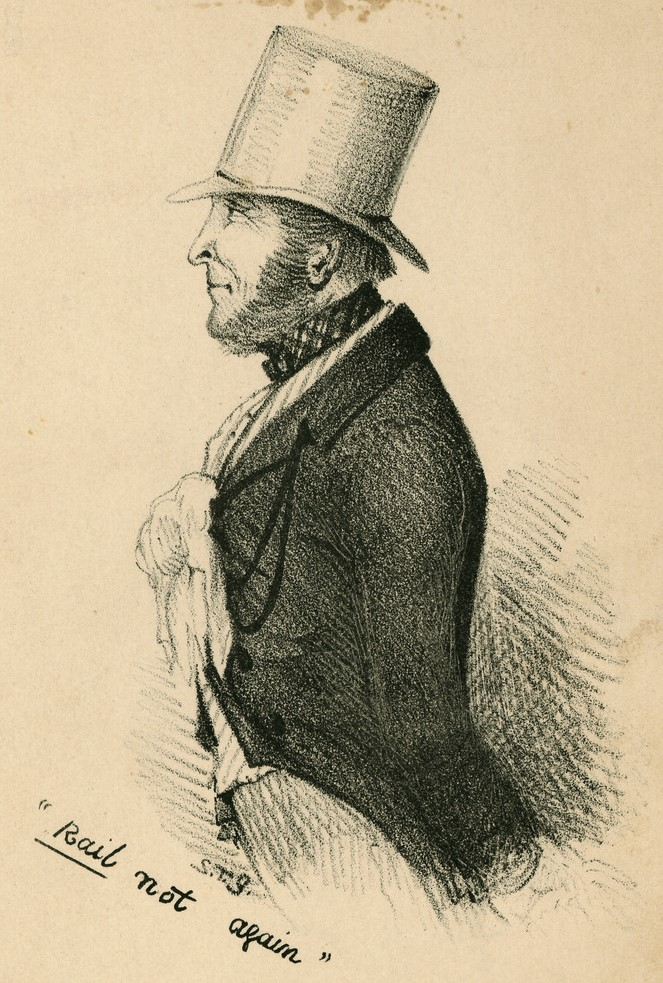

Edward Lindley Grundy (c. 1795 – 21 January 1875) was a businessman, politician and editor in the young colony of South Australia.

== History ==
Edward Lindley Grundy, a member of a distinguished Nottingham family, left England with his son Edward Mason Grundy on the Enmore, arriving in South Australia on 23 December 1847. Prior to leaving he was a resident of Manchester, and noted for his association with the Christian Institute, Sunday Schools, philanthropic and temperance causes.

He spent some years as a sharebroker in Adelaide, ran a school in Brighton and was a frequent contributor to the Adelaide newspapers. He moved to Gawler in 1858, where he found employment as an auctioneer, accountant and Commission agent. Sometime before March 1860 he founded a newspaper, the Standard.

He was a founding member of Gawler's "Humbug Society" (whose members included L. S. Burton, George Isaacs, J. P. Stow and Dr George Nott) and was that organization's inaugural "Grand Flam". It was the Humbug Society and The Bunyip, a newspaper which sponsored his election to the House of Assembly seat of Barossa, which he won by 60 votes and served from March 1860 to November 1862. He did not contest the following election. He was appointed editor of the Gawler Bunyip in 1871. On announcing his intention to run for the seat of Yatala in 1875 he was described as a "frisky young aspirant about 70 years of age"

He died, after a short illness, of erysipelas. The funeral proceedings bore elements of a farce: he had been living with a Catholic family, and though he was a practicing Anglican, and a seatholder of St. George's Church, they had the bishop administer to him the Catholic sacraments of Baptism and Holy Communion. They also made arrangements for him to be buried in Gawler, where he had lived for some time, but his son and brother-in-law employed a second undertaker to take charge of the body and transported it to the West Terrace Cemetery, where it was interred on 23 January 1875.

== Family ==
- Edward Mason Grundy ( – ) married Lucy Lomax ( – ) on 21 December 1851. Lucy's father James Lomax was proprietor of the Stockport Advertiser.
- Edmund Lindley Grundy ( – ) married Jane Lomax ( – ), sister of Lucy, on 14 November 1850
- Francis Edgar Grundy (1832 – 25 April 1896) married Ellen Matilda "Minnie" Yeo (1835 – 21 August 1910); he was a chemist in Gawler, later lived in Wakefield Street

- Edward Lindley Grundy (1 March 1871 – 12 May 1947) married Minnie Pflaum (21 April 1880 – ) on 26 October 1904
- Fanny Mason Grundy (1857 – 9 November 1896) married Thomas Duffield on 13 March 1879
- Bertha Louisa Grundy (20 January 1865 – ) married Villeneuve Francis Smith (c. 1851 – ) on 23 August 1883
- Edward Lindley Grundy (1871 – 12 May 1947) lived Grange Road, Lower Mitcham

- Henry Bleasby Grundy ( – ) married Hannah Green ( – ) on 14 April 1865
