= Thomas Smellie =

Thomas Smellie may refer to:

- Thomas Smellie (politician) (1849–1925), of Ontario
- Thomas Smellie (minister), Presbyterian educator in South Australia
