= The Bunyip =

Weekly newspaper published in Gawler, South Australia

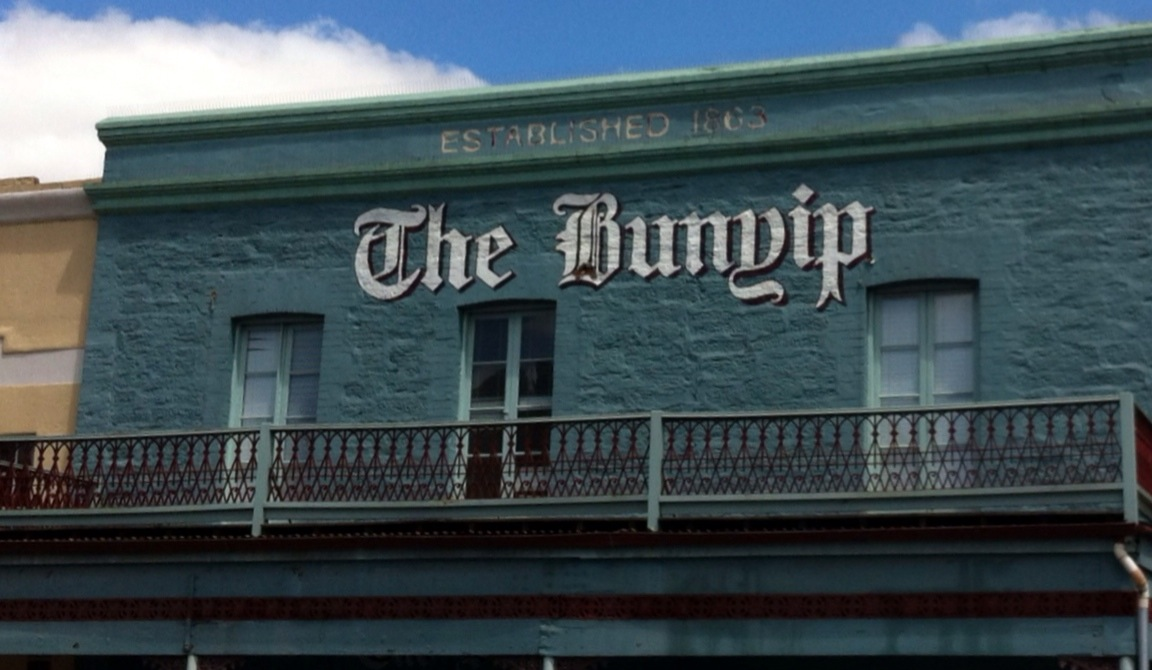
The Bunyip newspaper building, Gawler South, South Australia established 1863

The Bunyip is a weekly newspaper, first printed on 5 September 1863, and originally published and printed in Gawler, South Australia. Its distribution area includes the Gawler, Barossa, Light, Playford, and Adelaide Plains areas. Along with The Murray Pioneer, The River News, and The Loxton News, The Bunyip was now owned (since 2003) by the Taylor Group of Newspapers and printed in Renmark.

On 1 April 2020, The Bunyip announced that it would cease publication "indefinitely" as a result of losses due to the coronavirus crisis. However, due to public support, the newspaper was able to return shortly afterwards. In August–October 2020, with the temporary closure of The Border Watch, The Bunyip briefly became South Australia's oldest rural newspaper still in print.

== History ==
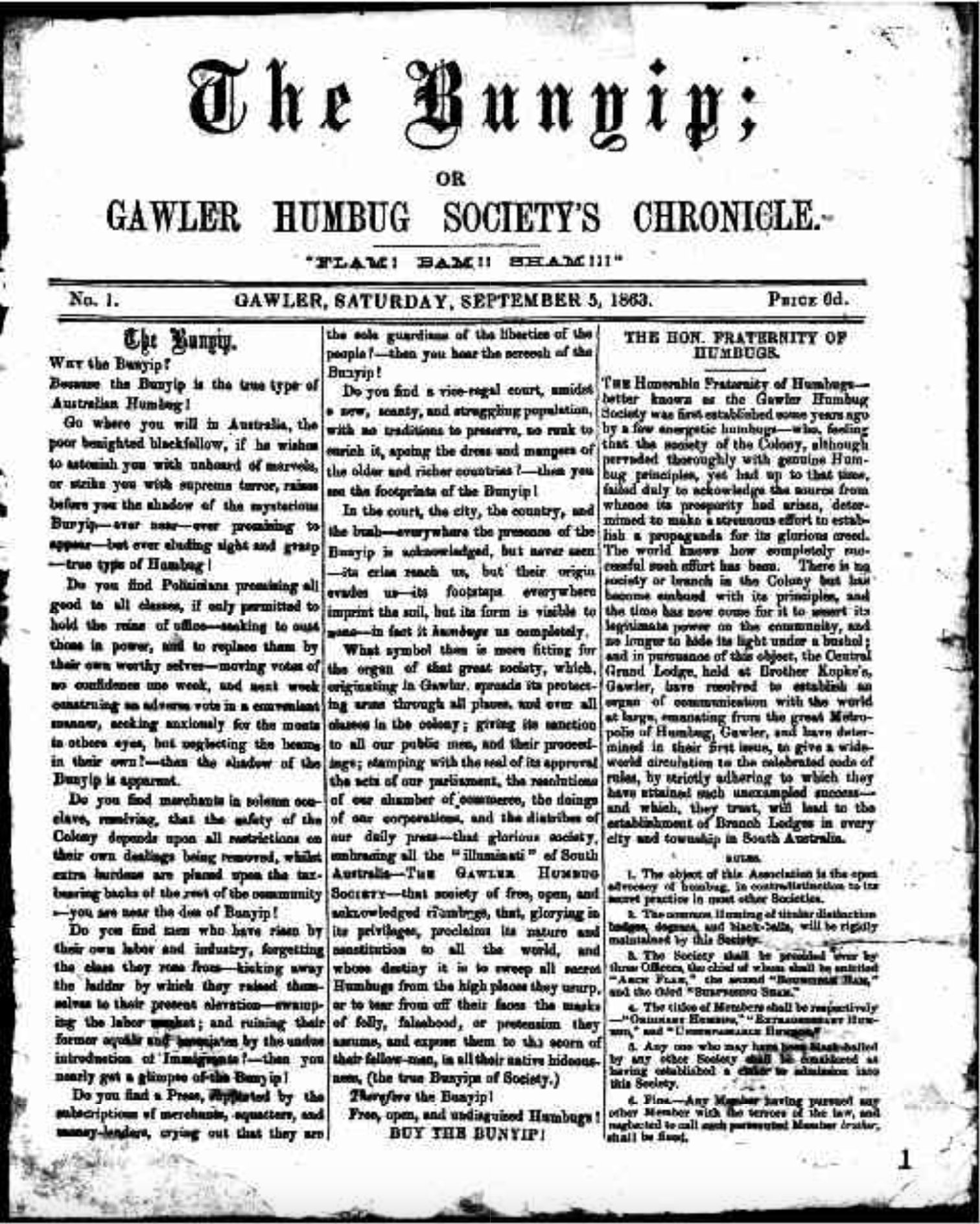
The Bunyip first issue (5 Sep 1863) p.1

Originally a monthly publication, the first issue of The Bunyip, subtitled "Gawler Humbug Society's Chronicle" (Note: Members of the Humbug Society included E. L. Grundy, L. S. Burton, George Isaacs, J. P. Stow, and Dr. George Nott (c. 1822–1872)) was issued on 5 September 1863, consisted of eight pages and was priced at 6d. The name was chosen because "the Bunyip is the true type of Australian Humbug!" It was warmly greeted by the South Australian Register, observing that it was "full of racy articles and local hits ... a very humorous article on the Gawler Agricultural Society's last dinner, which (was) not only very amusing but strictly correct ... (and should) undoubtedly prove a great success."

With the paper's success, publication increased to bi-monthly in February 1865 (there was none printed in January), appearing on the first and third Saturday of each month. With new printing machinery, the paper upsized to broadsheet format, and its title had become The Bunyip or Gawler Chronicle and Northern Advertiser. The following year it became a weekly. By this time however, the paper's original offbeat stance had quite vanished and it had become a regular newspaper.

With three newspapers published in Gawler at the time, conditions allowed William Barnet, the proprietor, to purchase rival the Gawler Times (5 March 1869 to 27 June 1873). Another rival, the weekly (later biweekly) Gawler Mercury (27 November 1875 – 8 July 1876) also folded after a brief run of less than nine months. In February 1885 The Bunyip's building was destroyed by fire. Barnet again wasted no time in having its competitor of seven years, the Gawler Standard (11 January 1878 – 27 February 1885), take over printing duties, then arranged with J. N. Richards (died 23 August 1886), its proprietor, for an immediate merger.

In January 1969, the newspaper absorbed the Junction and Gilbert Valley News, which had been published in Hamley Bridge since February 1940.

== Controversies ==
The Bunyip's first issue elicited a libel case against the publisher, William Barnet, by one Dr. Home Popham who had set up a hospital in the town and who had advertised boastfully in The Northern Star. The court proceedings were a merry affair with Mr. Stow appearing for the defence and the jury found for the plaintiff, awarding damages of one shilling. Four years later, Barnet was sued in the SA. Supreme Court by Henry Edward Bright MP, for libel and found not guilty. This was greeted by both The Register and the Advertiser as a landmark decision.

== List of owners ==
- William Barnet (1834–1895) married Hannah Burfield. His daughter Edith Violet Barnet married Frederic C. Custance, son of Professor John D. Custance in 1916.
- Robert Henry Barnet (c. 1869–1917) was third son of William and Hannah
- Frank L(indley) Barnet (1876–1941), a graduate of Roseworthy College, was owner from 1917. He was fifth son of William and Hannah, married Clarice Isobel Carne in 1919.
- Kenneth Lindley "Ken" Barnet (1919–2000) was son of Frank and Clarice.
- John Barnet ran the paper from 1975. Son of Ken, he married Rosemary Stephens in 1973.
- It remained in the Barnet family until 2003. It is now owned by the Taylor Group, also a family concern, who are also owners of the Murray Pioneer, based in Renmark.

== List of editors ==
- Dr George Nott (c. 1822 – 9 December 1872) was editor 1863–1866 (Note: Dr Nott arrived in South Australia some time around 1848 or 1849 and moved to Gawler in May 1852. A well respected man, he was to the fore in every movement to promote the town. He died at Semaphore, South Australia, where he had been staying in the hope of relief from his debilitating illness. His funeral procession to the Willaston cemetery was the longest the town had seen, and the Anglican burial service was followed by the Freemasons' funeral oration, and another from the various Friendly Societies of which he had been a member.)
- T. Godfrey 1867 to 1868 (went on to Wallaroo Times then New Zealand)
- J. B. Austin 1868 (then founded Gawler Times)
- Benjamin Hoare 1869 to 1871 (later to have an illustrious career with the Melbourne Age)
- Edward Grundy 1871 to 1875 (ex-parliamentarian and political aspirant 1875)
- George E. Loyau 1878 to 1879 (an important historian of the district)
- Louis Joseph Wilson 1880 (arrested for embezzling £107 10s. 6d. from Mudla Wirra council, of which he was clerk. Was also secretary of the Jockey Club)
- Alfred Drakard 1881 to 1882
- Henry John "Harry" Congreve 1885 to 1890 (also prominent writer to Adelaide papers as "H. J. C.")
- E. H. Coombe 1890 to 1914
- Robert Barnet 1914 to 1917
- Leslie S. Duncan 1917 to c. 1945 Duncan was M.P. for Gawler, and with the Bunyip for 30 years.
- Ken Barnet c. 1945 to c. 1965
- Paul Vincent c. 1965 to ??
- Ken Barnet
- John Barnet 1975 to 2003
- Terry Williams 2003 to 2004
- Heidi Helbig 2004
- Rob McLean 2011
- Grady Hudd 2016
- Nick Hopton 2021 to 2022
- Vanessa Rose 2022
- Brendan Simpkins 2022 to 2023
- Ben Lennon, November 2023 - current

== Distribution ==
Like other Taylor Group publications, the newspaper is also available online.

== See also ==
- Bunyip
