= 1888 SAFA season =

1888 SAFA premiership season
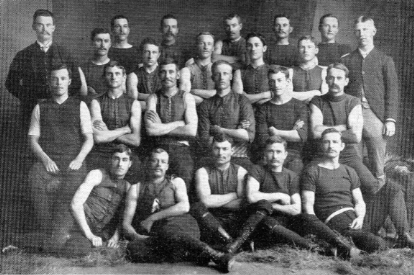
- 12th SAFA season Pictured above is the 1888 Norwood Championship of Australia team.
- Teams: 7
- Premiers: Norwood; 8th premiership
- Leading goalkicker: Charles Woods; Norwood (29 goals)
- Matches played: 57
- Highest: 9,000 (Round 9, Norwood vs. Port Adelaide)

The 1888 South Australian Football Association season (officially United Football Association of South Australia) was the 12th season of the top-level Australian rules football competition in South Australia. The Norwood Football Club won their 8th premiership by winning 1 premiership point, or a half a win, more than Port Adelaide.

West Adelaide folded after just one season (1887), their resignation was accepted at the Annual General Meeting of the SAFA held on 5 April 1888, as they were unable to get a team together. At the same meeting permission was given for Hotham to change their name to North Adelaide and for Gawler to remove the word Albion from their name.

It was reported on 14 April 1888 - The West Adelaides being unable to get together a team have quietly dropped out of the Senior Association, but the North Adelaides (late Hotham) and Gawler (late Gawler Albions) Clubs intend to persevere. There are now six associated clubs, consequently each will be engaged every Saturday.

Hotham Club which joined the SAFA in 1887 was renamed North Adelaide for the 1888 Season. It would also add a blue hoop to their red and white guernseys and wear blue and white hose so as not to clash with the new club Medindie whose colours were also Red and White. The North Adelaide (Hotham) club disbanded at the end of the Season following a merger with Adelaide. It has no connection with the North Adelaide Football Club currently in the SANFL which joined in 1888 as Medindie for its inaugural senior season and would later be renamed North Adelaide for the 1893 Season.

Medindie, the future North Adelaide Football Club, became the 7th senior Club when it joined the United Football Association formed by the Adelaide, Port Adelaide and South Adelaide Football Clubs following the resignations of those clubs from the South Australia Football Association.

Founding Senior Clubs of United Football Association for 1888 Season
Adelaide	Gawler	Hotham (North Adelaide 1888)	Medindie	Norwood	Port Adelaide	South Adelaide

== Programming of Matches ==
On 21st April, prior to the spilt, the SAFA Programme was arranged carrying out the recommendation of the whole Association, the committee had provided that the Norwoods, Ports, Adelaides, Sonth Adelaides, and North Adelaides shall play each other three times. The Gawlers only desire to play two matches with each of the other clubs, and their wish was acted upon. The season was to open on May 5, when the Norwoods, Ports, and Adelaides respectively play the Souths, North Adelaides, and Gawlers.

Under the SAFA individual clubs arranged their matches and the venues rather the Association. A dispute then arose between the Clubs once South Adelaide, Port Adelaide and Adelaide had come to terms with the South Australian Cricket Association (SACA) for leasing of Adelaide Oval during the Football Season. Norwood preferred to host their home gates at Kensington Oval, Port Adelaide at Alberton Oval and the country team Gawler, which was 40km from Adelaide, at their local Gawler Recreation Oval.

== SAFA Split and Dissolution / Formation of United Football Association of South Australia ==
The Association then split before the season commenced with the 3 oldest clubs - Adelaide, Port Adelaide and South Adelaide resigning from the SAFA on 25 April and creating their own new Association. An advertisement was placed on Friday 27th and Saturday 28th April 1888 by these clubs inviting other Clubs to submit their applications by 5pm on Monday 30th April 1888. Applications had been received from two Junior Clubs Creswick and Medindie, which was later to become North Adelaide in 1893, to join their new Association.

A meeting of three delegates of each of the Adelaide, South Adelaide, and Port Football Clubs was held at the Exchange Hotel, Adelaide, on Thursday evening 9th May 1881. Mr. H. S. Wyatt presided. The action of the three clubs in declining to submit the dispute to arbitration was further endorsed. After other business was transacted the following resolution was unanimously carried—" That a new Football Association be formed." Applications from the Creswick and Medindie Football Clubs were received. Messrs. Liston (Norwood) and Rickard (North Adelaide) were invited to the meeting, but being unable to give hope of joining the new Association the applications of the two clubs previously mentioned were accepted.

This would have left only the strong Norwood club and the two new clubs from last season Gawler and Hotham in the original SAFA. Most of the dispute was over fixtures and individual clubs having to arrange with the South Australian Cricket Association lease of the Adelaide Oval for matches. Norwood were proposing to play all their home games at the Kensington Oval and the Gawler Club were unable to secure any matches at Adelaide Oval due to the Cricket Association objections.

The new body, with a view of suppressing professionalism, also passed the following rule " Any player or member of any associated club receiving payment directly or indirectly for his services as a footballer shall be disqualify for any period the general committee may think fit; and any associated club paying a player either directly or indirectly for his services as a footballer shall be fined £10, and in addition lose the match and be disqualified for the remainder of the season." The wisdom of the adoption of this rule cannot be overestimated, as the baneful effect of this habit, which was beginning to get more frequent in the colony, has been noticeable in the past. A programme of matches was eventually drawn up to the general satisfaction of the clubs.

=== Public Meeting Saturday evening of 5 May 1888 ===
On Saturday evening of 5 May 1888, a public meeting convened by the Hon. J.C Bray, M.P., Messrs. L. Cohen, M.P., and S. Solomon, M.P. was held at the Adelaide Town Hall with a crowded attendance. Mr. A. J. Roberts, the popular member and ex-captain of the Norwood team, stated that by request he had attended a meeting of the other clubs that evening and he considered that some arrangement might be made with them. The meeting was adjourned for the purpose of allowing Mr. Roberts to hear the other clubs' views on the subject. They replied as follows:–" That the meeting in the Town Hall be informed that the formation of a new association will be proceeded with, and there being two vacancies applications will be favorably received from the Norwood and North Adelaide (Hotham) clubs."

Alderman Solomon then moved : –" That in the opinion of this meeting the resolution passed by the new association be accepted by this meeting, provided the clubs, including the Gawler Club, are admitted on an equal basis now forming the new association," The meeting again adjourned, when the three clubs (South, Port and Adelaide) intimated their willingness to receive applications from the Norwood, North Adelaide, and Gawler clubs. The proposal was accepted, The meeting concluded with cheers for Mr. Roberts, whose efforts had conduced to a large extent to the satisfactory result.

=== First Meeting of new Association (9 May 1888) ===
Applications were duly sent in by the Norwood, North Adelaide (Hotham) and Gawler clubs by the appointed time, and on Wednesday evening the first meeting of the new association was held. Delegates attended from the following seven clubs - Port Adelaide, Adelaide, South Adelaide, North Adelaide (Hotham), Norwood, Gawler, and Medindie. Alterations and amendments were made to several of the rules which have been the cause of trouble in previous seasons.

The first meeting of the newly-formed football association was held at the Trade Exchange on Wednesday evening, 9th May 1888, when there was a full attendance of Delegates from the following seven clubs - Port Adelaide, Adelaide, South Adelaide, North Adelaide (Hotham), Norwood, Gawler, and Medindie. Mr. H. S. Wyatt occupied the chair, and explained to the delegates of the Norwood, North Adelaide (Hotham) and Gawler clubs that their application to join the association had been formally laid before the committee, and had been received. The draft rules were first considered, and it was resolved that the name of the association should be the United Football Association of South Australia or such other name as the association may in committee from time to time determine.' Some objection was taken to this, and it was urged that as the South Australian Football Association would now be dissolved its name might be taken. Alterations and amendments were also made to several of the rules which have been the cause of trouble in previous seasons.

=== Initial Matches ===
	Non-Premiership Matches
Saturday, 5 May (3:15 pm)	Adelaide 7.5 (7)	def.	South Adelaide 5.3 (5)	Adelaide Oval (crowd: 2,000)
Saturday, 5 May	Norwood 8.11 (8)	def.	North Adelaide 2.2 (2)	Kensington Oval (crowd: 300)
These games did not contribute to premiership as clubs had resigned from the old SAFA and new association was formed after this weekend.

== Premiership season ==
=== Round 1 ===
	Round 1
Saturday, 12 May (3:00 pm)	Norwood 1.0 (1)	drew with	South Adelaide 1.2 (1)	Adelaide Oval (crowd: 2,000)
Saturday, 12 May	Port Adelaide 3.8 (3)	def.	Medindie 0.3 (0)	Alberton Oval (crowd: 150)
Saturday, 12 May (3:30 pm)	Adelaide 4.5 (4)	def.	North Adelaide 0.3 (0)	Kensington Oval (crowd: 150)
	Bye; Gawler
The game between Norwood and South Adelaide was ended early due to heavy rain.

=== Round 2 ===
	Round 2
Saturday, 19 May (3:10 pm)	Adelaide 5.7 (5)	def.	Port Adelaide 4.7 (4)	Adelaide Oval (crowd: 3,000)
Saturday, 19 May (3:27 pm)	South Adelaide 5.10 (5)	def.	North Adelaide 2.2 (2)	Kensington Oval (crowd: 300)

=== Round 3 ===
	Round 3
Thursday, 24 May (3:00 pm)	Adelaide 9.10 (9)	def.	South Adelaide 3.8 (3)	Adelaide Oval (crowd: 8,000)
Thursday, 24 May (3:00 pm)	Gawler 1.2 (1)	def. by	Port Adelaide 9.18 (9)	Gawler Oval (crowd: unknown)
Round 3 games on Thursday 24 May were played on the Queen's Birthday.; This was Gawler's first match for the season.; Norwood were absent as they were in Melbourne playing Victorian Clubs

=== Round 4 ===
	Round 4
Saturday, 26 May	South Adelaide 6.4 (6)	def. by	Port Adelaide 7.9 (7)	Adelaide Oval (crowd: 3,000)
Saturday, 26 May	Gawler 1.2 (1)	def. by	Adelaide 7.9 (7)	Gawler (crowd: 350)
Saturday, 26 May	North Adelaide 5.14 (5)	def.	Medindie 0.4 (0)	Kensington Oval (crowd: 100)
	Bye; Norwood
Norwood were absent as they were in Melbourne playing the premier team in the VFA Carlton Football Club at the Melbourne Cricket Ground - Crowd 15,000 Result Carlton 7-8 defeated Norwood 5-12; Some newspapers give the Gawler score as 1.3.

=== Round 5 ===
	Round 5
Saturday, 2 June (3:11 pm)	Norwood 9.10 (9)	def.	Adelaide 3.7 (3)	Kensington Oval (crowd: 4,000)
Saturday, 2 June (3:15 pm)	South Adelaide 9.31 (9)	def.	Medindie 1.3 (1)	Adelaide Oval (crowd: 300)
Saturday, 2 June (3:25 pm)	Port Adelaide 7.17 (7)	def.	North Adelaide 1.3 (1)	Alberton Oval (crowd: 300)
	Bye; Gawler
South Adelaide set the record for the most behinds in a game at 31.

=== Round 6 ===
	Round 6
Saturday, 9 June (3:08 pm)	Norwood 10.10 (10)	def.	South Adelaide 5.4 (5)	Kensington Oval (crowd: 2,000)
Saturday, 9 June (3:10 pm)	Adelaide 4.8 (4)	def. by	North Adelaide 5.3 (5)	Adelaide Oval (crowd: 1,000)
Saturday, 9 June (Time pm)	Gawler 4.5 (4)	def.	Medindie 1.3 (1)	Gawler (crowd: 200)
	Bye; Port Adelaide

=== Round 7 ===
	Round 7
Saturday, 16 June (Time pm)	Port Adelaide 8.11 (8)	def.	South Adelaide 1.3 (1)	Alberton Oval (crowd: 2,000)
Saturday, 16 June (3:11 pm)	Norwood 12.8 (12)	def.	North Adelaide 1.1 (1)	Adelaide Oval (crowd: 3,000)
Saturday, 16 June (Time pm)	Adelaide 10.12 (10)	def.	Medindie 3.2 (3)	Kensington Oval (crowd: 150)

=== Round 8 ===
	Round 8
Wednesday, 20 June (3:00 pm)	Norwood 2.7 (2)	drew with	Port Adelaide 2.5 (2)	Adelaide Oval (crowd: 9,000)
Wednesday, 20 June (Time pm)	North Adelaide 1.4 (1)	def.	Medindie 0.6 (0)	Adelaide Oval (crowd: 100)
Wednesday, 20 June (Time pm)	Gawler 1.8 (1)	def. by	South Adelaide 4.9 (4)	Gawler (crowd: 450)
	Bye; Adelaide

=== Round 9 ===
	Round 9
Saturday, 23 June (Time pm)	Adelaide 4.7 (4)	def.	South Adelaide 3.9 (3)	Adelaide Oval (crowd: 2,000)
Saturday, 23 June (3:15 pm)	Port Adelaide 12.12 (12)	def.	Medindie 1.1 (1)	Alberton Oval
Saturday, 23 June (Time pm)	Gawler 2.5 (2)	def. by	Norwood 8.8 (8)	Gawler (crowd: 350)

=== Round 10 ===
	Round 10
Saturday, 30 June (Time pm)	Adelaide 5.8 (5)	def. by	Norwood 10.15 (10)	Adelaide Oval (crowd: 4,500)
Saturday, 30 June (3:20 pm)	South Adelaide 12.5 (12)	def.	Medindie 1.1 (1)	Kensington Oval
Saturday, 30 June (3:20 pm)	Port Adelaide 7.23 (7)	def.	Gawler 0.1 (0)	Alberton Oval (crowd: 450)
The match between Port and Gawler was marred by some bad behaviour by C. Fry of Port Adelaide, who has hitherto played anything but a tough game this season, made himself responsible for some very unseemly conduct. During the third quarter, without apparently the slightest provocation being offered him, he struck Burton, of the Gawlers, a heavy blow in the chest. Burton did not retaliate, but called the umpire's attention. In the last quarter the Gawlers managed to obtain a behind and the Ports 2 goals and 11 behinds. Fry in the last quarter again used his fists. He struck Thomson twice and attempted to hit H. Bischof. The umpire awarded one of the Gawler men a mark, but Fry got hold of the ball and kicked it to the other side of the ground amongst the spectators. Acting on the advice of one of the Gawler delegates, half the team left the field, the bell shortly after ringing. Fry will be reported at the next Association meeting. It was noted in the match report – Such conduct is deserving of censure. It being Fry's first offence since the new Association was formed it is probable that he will be fined only, although the Association should take steps to have such exhibitions stopped. If the Association cannot disqualify him the club should do so. Their reputation is at stake if they cannot keep off the fields players whose tempers cannot be curbed. It is a pity Fry acted as he did, for there is scarcely a finer player this year, but rough play cannot be tolerated. At the Association meeting it was reported – C. Fry, a Port player, was reported to the association by Mr. J. Parks for striking Burton, of the Gawler team, during a match at Alberton on June 30. A number of gentlemen present expressed the opinion that a fine was quite inadequate to meet cases of this nature, as in nearly every instance the fine was paid by the club to which the delinquent belonged. The Port delegates (Messrs. Sweeney and Cruikshanks) stated that Fry had received great provocation, and that the Gawlers had played very roughly. It was decided to fine Fry £1 1s, and a vote of censure was passed upon him. A letter was received from one of the goal umpires in the same match stating that Fry had also struck Thompson, but as no formal complaint was brought forward nothing was done. Footnote - Next season Fry would kick 9 goals in the game against Gawler at Alberton and become the top goalkicker. In 1890, Gawler would forfeit both their games at Alberton.

=== Matches vs British Lions ===
British Lions Tour
Teams had 2 weekends off whilst an English Rugby Team was visiting Adelaide. A series of matches against the 4 local senior clubs was arranged.

South Adelaide
Saturday, 7 July, 3:03pm	South Adelaide	def.	British Isles	Adelaide Oval (crowd: 5,000)	Report
4.3; 5.5; 8.9; 8.9	Q1; Q2; Q3; Final	1.2; 3.6; 4.7; 5.9	Umpires: Blackman
Heenan 2, Watling 2, Grogan, Sinclair, Hill, Martin	Goals	Speakman 2, Stuart, Penketh, Thomas

Port Adelaide
Tuesday, 10 July	Port Adelaide	def. by	British Isles	Adelaide Oval (crowd: 2,000)	Report
0.2; 4.5; 7.5; 7.8	Q1; Q2; Q3; Final	2.4; 4.4; 4.6; 8.8	Umpires: Sidoli
Phillips 4, A Bushby, Miers, C Fry	Goals	Stoddart 3, Mathers 2, Thomas, Paul, Kent

Adelaide
Thursday, 12 July,	Adelaide	def.	British Isles	Adelaide Oval (crowd: 3,000)	Report
2.6; 2.9; 5.12; 6.13	Q1; Q2; Q3; Final	0.0; 3.1; 3.5; 3.6	Umpires: Blackman
McIntyre 2, Carter 2, Holbrook, Shawyer	Goals	AE Stoddart 2, WH Thomas

Norwood
Saturday, 14 July, 3:03pm	Norwood	def.	British Isles	Adelaide Oval (crowd: 8,000)	Report
0.2; 2.5; 3.7; 5.8	Q1; Q2; Q3; Final	1.0; 2.0; 3.1; 3.1	Umpires: Birrell
C Woods 3, Slattery, Haldane	Goals	Williams, Lawler, Stoddart

=== Round 11 ===
	Round 11
Saturday, 21 July	Port Adelaide 11.9 (11)	def.	Adelaide 1.2 (1)	Alberton Oval (crowd: 500)
Saturday, 21 July	South Adelaide 2.5 (2)	def.	North Adelaide 1.2 (1)	Adelaide Oval (crowd: 1,000)
Saturday, 21 July	Norwood 1.12 (1)	def.	Medindie 0.4 (0)	Kensington Oval

=== Round 12 ===
	Round 12
Saturday, 28 July	Norwood 11.21 (11)	def.	Port Adelaide 3.6 (3)	Kensington Oval (crowd: 7,000)
Saturday, 28 July (3:15 pm)	Adelaide 10.18 (10)	def.	Medindie 0.4 (0)	Adelaide Oval
Saturday, 28 July (3:35 pm)	Gawler 2.7 (2)	def. by	North Adelaide 4.5 (4)	Gawler (crowd: 250)
The match between Norwood and Port Adelaide effectively functioned as a premiership decider.

=== Round 13 ===
	Round 13
Saturday, 4 August (3:15 pm)	South Adelaide 5.11 (5)	def.	Adelaide 4.5 (4)	Adelaide Oval (crowd: 2,000)
Saturday, 4 August (Time pm)	Norwood 6.6 (6)	def.	North Adelaide 3.4 (3)	Kensington Oval (crowd: 200)
Saturday, 4 August (Time pm)	Port Adelaide 14.12 (14)	def.	Medindie 0.1 (0)	Alberton Oval (crowd: 400)

=== Round 14 ===
	Round 14
Saturday, 25 August	Norwood 11.21 (11)	def.	Medindie 1.1 (1)	Adelaide Oval (crowd: 800)
Saturday, 25 August	Adelaide 12.8 (12)	def.	North Adelaide 4.3 (4)	Kensington Oval
Saturday, 25 August (3:30 pm)	Gawler 2.5 (2)	def. by	South Adelaide 7.12 (7)	Gawler

=== Round 15 ===
	Round 15
Saturday, 1 September (Time pm)	Norwood 5.14 (5)	def.	Adelaide 1.5 (1)	Adelaide Oval
Saturday, 1 September (3:30 pm)	Port Adelaide 9.7 (9)	def.	North Adelaide 3.2 (3)	Alberton Oval
Saturday, 1 September (Time pm)	South Adelaide 9.9 (9)	def.	Medindie 4.0 (4)	Kensington Oval

=== Round 16 ===
	Round 16
Monday, 3 September (Time am)	Medindie 2.3 (2)	def. by	Gawler 3.5 (3)	Adelaide Oval
Monday, 3 September (Time am)	Norwood 9.10 (9)	def.	North Adelaide 2.2 (2)	Kensington Oval
Monday, 3 September (Time pm)	South Adelaide 4.14 (4)	def. by	Port Adelaide 5.3 (5)	Adelaide Oval (crowd: 5,000)

=== Round 17 ===
	Round 17
Saturday, 8 September (Time pm)	Adelaide 5.6 (5)	def. by	Port Adelaide 7.14 (7)	Adelaide Oval
Saturday, 8 September (Time pm)	Gawler 0.4 (0)	def. by	Norwood 5.16 (5)	Gawler Oval
Saturday, 8 September (Time pm)	South Adelaide 8.15 (8)	def.	North Adelaide 1.8 (1)	Kensington Oval

=== Round 18 ===
	Round 18
Saturday, 15 September (Time pm)	Adelaide 12.14 (12)	def.	Medindie 3.2 (3)	Kensington Oval
Saturday, 15 September (Time pm)	Gawler 2.6 (2)	def. by	North Adelaide 4.2 (4)	Gawler Oval
Saturday, 15 September (Time pm)	Norwood 11.13 (11)	def.	South Adelaide 3.10 (3)	Adelaide Oval (crowd: 2,500)
Other newspapers give the score for the Adelaide-Medindie match as 11.13 to 4.2. A team of from Broken Hill visited Adelaide and played the following games: Saturday, September 15, they play the Ports; Tuesday, September 18. North Adelaides; Thursday, September 20, Medindie; Saturday, September 22, Gawler; Monday, September 24, Mount Barker

=== Round 19 ===
	Round 19
Saturday, 22 September (Time pm)	Gawler 2.2 (2)	def. by	Adelaide 7.14 (7)	Gawler Oval (crowd: 150)
Saturday, 22 September (Time pm)	North Adelaide 0.1 (0)	def. by	Medindie 3.5 (3)	Adelaide Oval (crowd: 150)
Saturday, 22 September (Time pm)	Port Adelaide 6.11 (6)	def.	Norwood 5.14 (5)	Alberton Oval (crowd: 2,500)
Medindie’s only win for the season

=== Round 20 ===
	Round 20
Saturday, 29 September (Time pm)	North Adelaide 0.6 (0)	def. by	Port Adelaide 16.15 (16)	Adelaide Oval
Saturday, 29 September (Time pm)	Norwood 11.12 (11)	def.	Medindie 0.3 (0)	Kensington Oval
Port defeated North at Adelaide - J.McKenzie for Port kicking 10 and Philips 5; The premiership was decided when Norwood defeated Medindie at Kensington Oval; === Championship of Australia === : South Melbourne, premiers of the Victorian Football Association (VFA) visited Adelaide in October 1888 to play the South Australian Premiership Team Norwood in series of three matches which was the 1888 Championship of Australia. Norwood won all three matches which were played at Kensington Oval.

== Ladder ==
1888 SAFA Ladder
	TEAM	P	W	L	D	GF	BF	GA	BA	Pts
1	Norwood (P)	17	14	1	2	127	205	38	82	30
2	Port Adelaide	17	14	2	1	129	187	46	96	29
3	Adelaide	17	10	7	0	103	147	75	119	20
4	South Adelaide	17	9	7	1	87	165	72	97	19
5	North Adelaide (Hotham)	17	5	12	0	37	66	97	43	10
6	Gawler	12	2	10	0	20	52	65	123	4
7	Medindie	17	1	16	0	20	43	127	206	2
Key: P = Played, W = Won, L = Lost, D = Drawn, GF = Goals For, BF = Behinds For, GA = Goals Against, BA = Behinds Against, (P) = Premiers										

Note: The programme was resolved by each club playing every team 3 times except Gawler.
Gawler had requested to play each team only twice and was programmed 10 home games out of their total of 12.
Hotham had renamed to North Adelaide and would merge with Adelaide the next season. This was the 2nd time a club had renamed to North Adelaide the previous club being the Victorians in 1883 until they folded at the start of the 1885 season.
Medindee would rename to North Adelaide in 1893. There is no connection between these North Adelaide clubs.
