= 1887 SAFA season =

1887 SAFA premiership season
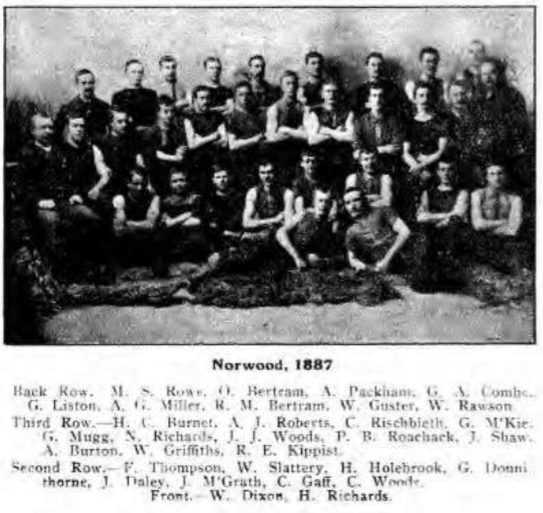
- 10th SAFA season Pictured above is the 1887 premiership team.
- Teams: 7
- Premiers: Norwood; 7th premiership
- Leading goalkicker: Alf Bushby; Port Adelaide (25 goals)
- Matches played: 55
- Highest: 11,000 (Round 8, Norwood vs. Port Adelaide)

The 1887 South Australian Football Association season was the 11th season of the top-level Australian rules football competition in South Australia. The Norwood Football Club won their 7th premiership, by winning 2 premiership points (2 draws) more than Port Adelaide due to the clubs not playing an equal number of games.

== Admission of New Clubs ==
On 15 March 1887 the West Torrens Football Club held a meeting at the Foundry Hotel, Hindley Street in Adelaide where it decided to change the name of the club to West Adelaide and apply for inclusion in the upcoming 1887 SAFA season. The Club has previously applied to join in 1879.

1887 saw the competition expand from 4 to 7 clubs when Gawler Albions, Hotham and West Adelaide were admitted to the SAFA with the last of those bearing no relation to the modern day West Adelaide Bloods.

== Programme of Fixtures ==
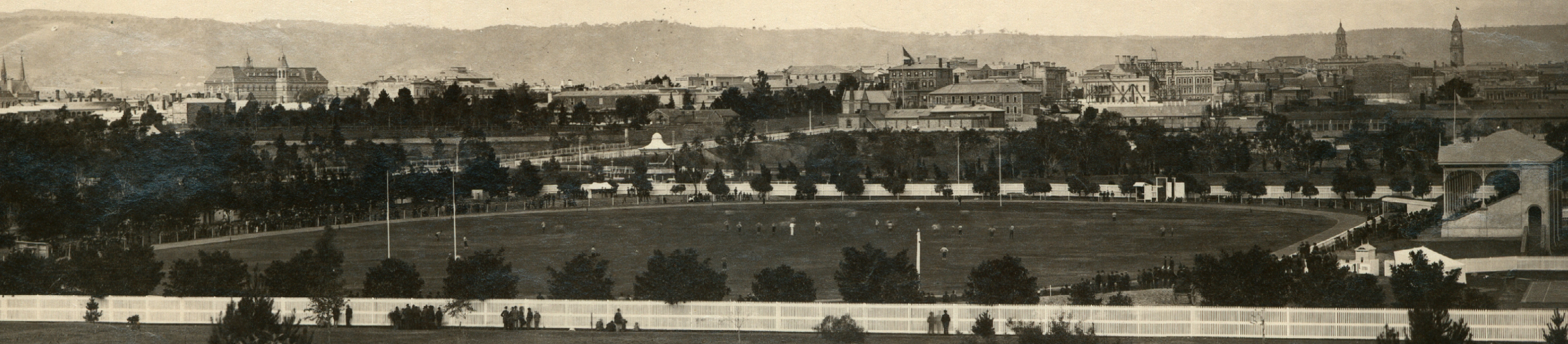
View of an Australian rules football match on Adelaide Oval from Montefiore Hill during the 1887 SAFA season. Note the lack of behind posts.

The Committee of the Association met on the 15th April, and adopted the programme which had been agreed upon by the Secretaries beforehand. This programme was rather unfair to the new clubs. The old clubs having so arranged matters that the Hothams will only have the benefit of playing on the Adelaide Oval four times during the season, while the West Adelaides and Gawlers only play there once each during the season.

A sub committee was formed to endeavour to arrange with the Traffic Manager to run a special train to Gawler after 1 o'clock on each of the six Saturdays when city teams have to play the Gawlers. It is to be hoped that some satisfactory arrangement will be made. If a special is not run it will be useless to expect the men to get away from business to catch the 12.15 train.

It was reported that The Ports will not be in the city very often during the coming season. At their own request two-thirds of their seventeen matches will be played on the Alberton Oval. They are making several improvements there, one which will be much appreciated being a scoring-board.

As the programme was arranged by the individual clubs hence the uneven number of games played. At the end of the season Port Adelaide requested to play an additional game against Hotham (as they had only played them twice compared to Norwood) but it was rejected by the Association. They also requested to play Norwood in a premiership playoff. Norwood and Port Adelaide had played each other 4 times during the season with the result being 2 wins and 2 draws in favour of Norwood. The premiership hence was awarded to Norwood.

The programme of football fixtures for the season was published on Saturday 14th May 1887.

== Premiership season ==
=== Round 1 ===
	Round 1
Saturday, 7 May (3:10 pm)	Adelaide 7.19 (7)	def.	Hotham 3.7 (3)	Adelaide Oval (crowd: 1,500)
Saturday, 7 May (3:25 pm)	Norwood 9.23 (9)	def.	West Adelaide 0.0 (0)	Kensington Oval
Saturday, 7 May (Time pm)	Port Adelaide 12.28 (12)	def.	Gawler 0.1 (0)	Alberton Oval (crowd: 800)
	Bye; South Adelaide

=== Round 2 ===
	Round 2
Saturday, 14 May (Time pm)	Adelaide 3.12 (3)	drew with	South Adelaide 3.4 (3)	Adelaide Oval (crowd: 2,300)
Saturday, 14 May (Time pm)	Port Adelaide 3.22 (3)	def.	West Adelaide 0.2 (0)	Alberton Oval (crowd: 600)
Saturday, 14 May (3:15 pm)	Norwood 6.14 (6)	def.	Hotham 0.2 (0)	Kensington Oval
	Bye; Gawler

=== Round 3 ===
	Round 3
Saturday, 21 May (3:15 pm)	Port Adelaide 3.4 (3)	drew with	Norwood 3.7 (3)	Alberton Oval (crowd: 3,000)
Saturday, 21 May (3:10 pm)	South Adelaide 9.21 (9)	def.	Hotham 6.5 (6)	Adelaide Oval (crowd: 1,000)
Saturday, 21 May (3:10 pm)	Adelaide 9.21 (9)	def.	West Adelaide 0.1 (0)	Kensington Oval (crowd: 100)
	Bye; Gawler

=== Round 4 (Queen's Birthday Holiday) ===
	Round 4
Tuesday, 24 May (2:58.30 pm)	Adelaide 3.8 (3)	drew with	Norwood 3.7 (3)	Adelaide Oval (crowd: 7,000 - 10,000)
Tuesday, 24 May	Port Adelaide 6.4 (6)	def.	South Adelaide 4.7 (4)	Alberton Oval (crowd: 2,000)
Tuesday, 24 May	Gawler 3.8 (3)	def. by	Hotham 6.25 (6)	Gawler Oval
The Adelaide v Norwood was reported as one of the largest crowds at a football match on the Adelaide Oval despite the unfavourable weather. Adelaide was without its captain J.D. Stephens. Gawler defeated by Hotham at Gawler - another Match report reported score as 3.5 to 6.15

=== Round 5 ===
	Round 5
Saturday, 28 May (3:04 pm)	South Adelaide 7.11 (7)	drew with	Norwood 7.11 (7)	Adelaide Oval (crowd: 3,000)
Saturday, 28 May (3:25 pm)	West Adelaide 3.12 (3)	drew with	Gawler 3.4 (3)	Kensington Oval
Saturday, 28 May	Port Adelaide 7.15 (7)	def.	Hotham 1.6 (1)	Alberton Oval (crowd: 300)
	Bye; Adelaide
Adelaide were on an interstate trip to Victoria to play a series of six matches.

=== Round 6 ===
	Round 6
Saturday, 4 June (3:25 pm)	South Adelaide 5.20 (5)	def.	West Adelaide 1.8 (1)	Kensington Oval
Saturday, 4 June (3:15 pm)	Norwood 7.15	def.	Hotham 1.5	Adelaide Oval
Saturday, 4 June (3:30 pm)	Gawler 0.0 (0)	def. by	Port Adelaide 3.18 (3)	Gawler Oval (crowd: 150)
	Bye; Adelaide

=== Round 7 ===
	Round 7
Saturday, 11 June (3:00 pm)	Adelaide 2.11 (2)	def. by	Port Adelaide 4.6 (4)	Adelaide Oval (crowd: 4,000)
Saturday, 11 June (3:25 pm)	Hotham 2.5 (2)	drew with	West Adelaide 2.4 (2)	Kensington Oval
Saturday, 11 June	Gawler 1.2 (1)	def. by	South Adelaide 9.23 (9)	Gawler Oval (crowd: 75)
	Bye; Norwood

=== Round 8 ===
	Round 8
Saturday, 18 June (3:16 pm)	Norwood 8.21 (8)	def.	West Adelaide 1.1 (1)	Adelaide Oval
Saturday, 18 June (3:35 pm)	South Adelaide 5.18 (5)	def.	Hotham 4.2 (4)	Kensington Oval (crowd: 200)
Saturday, 18 June (3:30 pm)	Gawler 0.4 (0)	def. by	Adelaide 8.15 (8)	Gawler Oval
	Bye; Port Adelaide

=== Round 9 ===
	Round 9
Monday, 20 June (?:?? pm)	Gawler 1.10 (1)	def. by	West Adelaide 2.8 (2)	Gawler Oval
Monday, 20 June (3:00 pm)	Norwood 6.16 (6)	def.	Port Adelaide 4.3 (4)	Adelaide Oval (crowd: 11,000)
The Norwood vs Port Adelaide match was under the patronage of the Chinese Commissioners to the Jubilee Exhibition General Wong Yang Ho and Console-General Yu Chiung.

=== Non-Premiership Match ===
	Non-Premiership Match
Tuesday, 22 Jun (Time pm)	Adelaide 5.4 (5)	def.	South Adelaide 2.10 (2)	Adelaide Oval (crowd: 8,000)
Adelaide vs South Adelaide - The South Australian Football Association refused to recognise the game in the counting for the premiership, but notwithstanding this there were fully 8,000 people present, the pavilion being thronged.

=== Round 10 ===
	Round 10
Saturday, 25 June (3:00 pm)	Adelaide 1.3 (1)	def. by	Norwood 5.15 (5)	Adelaide Oval (crowd: 4,500)
Saturday, 25 June (Time pm)	Port Adelaide 6.17 (6)	def.	Hotham 2.5 (2)	Alberton Oval (crowd: 300)
Saturday, 25 June (Time pm)	South Adelaide 8.20 (8)	def.	West Adelaide 2.5 (2)	South Park Lands, Adelaide (crowd: 250)
	Bye; Gawler
South Adelaide v. West Adelaide - This match was to have been played on the Kensington Oval but owing to the unfit state of the ground it was mutually decided to play on the South Park Lands.

=== Round 11 ===
	Round 11
Saturday, 2 July (3:00 pm)	South Adelaide 2.4 (2)	def. by	Norwood 6.6 (6)	Adelaide Oval (crowd: 3,500)
Saturday, 2 July (3:10 pm)	Port Adelaide 3.10 (3)	def. by	Adelaide 4.1 (4)	Alberton Oval (crowd: 1,000)
Saturday, 2 July (3.25 pm)	West Adelaide 0.3 (0)	def. by	Gawler 1.8 (1)	Kensington Oval (crowd: Approx. 12)
	Bye; Hotham
Crowd and condition of Kensington Oval – Saturday like many of its predecessors this season was wet and sloppy, and the ground was decidedly adverse to a good display of football. On the previous Saturday it was found impossible to play on the Kensington Oval, and it was thought by a great many that the teams whose turn it was to occupy Saturday would do likewise. The ground at 3 o'clock wore a singularly desolate appearance, there being only one spectator on the scene. A quarter of an hour later about a dozen persons had gathered to witness the contest, while the competing parties had about 15 men apiece. By the aid of subs, however, the teams were brought as nearly as possible to the orthodox number. At nearly 25 minutes past 3 the teams were led into the field by their respective captains, and the game was started on the sticky turf. When the half-time bell rang the scores stood — Gawlers, 1 goal 4 behinds; West Adelaides, 1 behind. The ringing of the bell was the signal for a large troupe of juveniles who had been anxiously awaiting at the gate to enter the ground and take possession of the pavilion. These were effectual in creating at least a little noise, and when the teams again took the field there were a considerable number present.

=== Round 12 ===
	Round 12
Saturday, 23 July (3:15 pm)	Adelaide 3.12 (3)	drew with	South Adelaide 3.9 (3)	Adelaide Oval (crowd: 2,000)
Saturday, 23 July (Time pm)	Hotham 5.11 (5)	def.	West Adelaide 0.4 (0)	Kensington Oval
Saturday, 23 July (3:11 pm)	Port Adelaide 4.1 (4)	drew with	Norwood 4.8 (4)	Alberton Oval (crowd: 3,500)
	Bye; Gawler

=== Round 13 ===
	Round 13
Saturday, 30 July (3:15 pm)	Adelaide 5.16 (5)	def.	Hotham 0.3 (0)	Kensington Oval (crowd: 150)
Saturday, 30 July (3:30 pm)	Gawler 1.4 (1)	def. by	Norwood 7.15 (7)	Gawler Oval (crowd: 350)
Saturday, 30 July (3:21 pm)	South Adelaide 6.8 (6)	def. by	Port Adelaide 8.3 (8)	Adelaide Oval (crowd: 2,500)
	Bye; West Adelaide

=== Round 14 ===
	Round 14
Saturday, 6 August (3:06 pm)	Adelaide 4.8 (4)	def.	Norwood 2.13 (2)	Adelaide Oval (crowd: 4,000)
Saturday, 6 August (3:20 pm)	Port Adelaide 11.29 (11)	def.	West Adelaide 1.3 (1)	Alberton Oval (crowd: 200)
Saturday, 6 August (3:30 pm)	South Adelaide 3.13 (3)	drew with	Hotham 3.4 (3)	Kensington Oval (crowd: 200)
	Bye; Gawler

=== Round 15 ===
	Round 15
Saturday, 13 August (3:15 pm)	Port Adelaide 6.14 (6)	def.	Adelaide 2.9 (2)	Alberton Oval (crowd: 3,000)
Saturday, 13 August (3:00 pm)	South Adelaide 16.27 (16)	def.	Gawler 2.3 (2)	Adelaide Oval (crowd: 400)
Saturday, 13 August (3:30 pm)	Norwood 14.26 (14)	def.	West Adelaide 0.0 (0)	Kensington Oval (crowd: 200)
	Bye; Hotham

=== Round 16 ===
	Round 16
Saturday, 20 August (3:08 pm)	Norwood 5.11 (5)	def.	Port Adelaide 2.9 (2)	Adelaide Oval (crowd: 8,000)
Saturday, 20 August	South Adelaide 4.20 (4)	drew with	Hotham 4.7 (4)	Kensington Oval (crowd: 100)
	Bye; West Adelaide,Adelaide,Gawler.
Note - Gawler played Salisbury at Gawler.

=== Round 17 ===
	Round 17
Saturday, 27 August (3:00 pm)	South Adelaide 7.5 (7)	def.	Norwood 5.6 (5)	Adelaide Oval (crowd: 3,000)
Saturday, 27 August (3:25 pm)	Adelaide 4.17 (4)	def.	Hotham 1.9 (1)	Kensington Oval
Saturday, 27 August (3:15 pm)	Port Adelaide 17.27 (17)	def.	West Adelaide 2.0 (2)	Alberton Oval (crowd: 200)
	Bye; Gawler
Port Adelaide's score of 17.27 (17) was the highest total ever at the time in South Australian league football.

=== Round 18 ===
	Round 18
Thursday, 1 September (3:08 pm)	Adelaide 1.2 (1)	def. by	South Adelaide 6.2 (6)	Adelaide Oval (crowd: 2,500)

=== Round 19 ===
	Round 19
Saturday, 3 September	Port Adelaide 11.11 (11)	def.	South Adelaide 4.8 (4)	Alberton Oval (crowd: 2,000)
Saturday, 3 September (3:15 pm)	Adelaide 7.20 (7)	v	Gawler 1.4 (1)	Adelaide Oval (crowd: 100)
Saturday, 3 September	Norwood 14.20 (14)	def.	West Adelaide 0.1 (0)	Kensington Oval (crowd: 100)
	Bye; Hotham

=== Round 20 ===
	Round 20
Saturday, 10 September	Norwood 8.23 (8)	def.	Hotham 0.4 (0)	Adelaide Oval (crowd: 1,000)
Saturday, 10 September (3:20 pm)	Adelaide 4.21 (4)	def.	West Adelaide 3.3 (3)	Kensington Oval
	Bye; Port Adelaide, South Adelaide, Gawler

=== Round 21 ===
	Round 21
Saturday, 17 September	Adelaide 4.7 (4)	def. by	Port Adelaide 5.12 (5)	Adelaide Oval
	Bye; South Adelaide, Norwood, Gawler, Hotham, West Adelaide

== Ladder ==
1887 SAFA Ladder
	TEAM	P	W	L	D	GF	BF	GA	BA	Pts	Adj Pts
1	Norwood (P)	18	12	2	4	119	257	40	73	28	28.00
2	Port Adelaide	17	12	3	2	110	220	46	103	26	27.53
3	Adelaide	16	9	4	3	67	195	43	109	21	23.63
4	South Adelaide	17	8	5	4	102	221	72	101	20	21.18
5	Hotham	15	3	10	2	37	98	77	227	8	9.60
6	Gawler	11	1	9	1	13	48	72	197	3	4.91
7	West Adelaide	16	1	13	2	18	52	114	288	4	4.50
Key: P = Played, W = Won, L = Lost, D = Drawn, GF = Goals For, BF = Behinds For, GA = Goals Against, BA = Behinds Against, Pts = Points, Adj Pts = Points adjusted for match ratio, (P) = Premiers											

== Intercolonial Matches ==
During May, Adelaide the SAFA 1886 premiers visited Melbourne and played a series of six matches.
Results:
Adelaide defeated St Kilda and South Ballarat, but lost to Carlton, Fitzroy, Geelong and Tasmania.

During July, Carlton the Victorian 1887 premiers visited Adelaide and played a series of five matches against SAFA Clubs.
Results:
Carlton defeated Hotham, Norwood and Port Adelaide, Drew with South Adelaide but lost to Adelaide.
