= North Adelaide Football Club (1881–1888) =

Names
- Full name: North Adelaide Football Club (1888)
- Former name(s): Hotham Football Club (1879-1887)

Club details
- Founded: 1879
- Dissolved: 22 March 1889 (Merged)
- Colours: Red and White; Hoop added in 1888
- Competition: Adelaide and Suburban Association 1885-86; South Australian Football Association 1887-88
- Premierships: Adelaide and Suburban Association 1885, 1886
- Ground: North parklands

The North Adelaide Football Club (1888) originally known as the Hotham Football Club prior to 1888 was an Australian rules football club based in North Adelaide, South Australia. It participated in the South Australian Football Association for two seasons. In the 1887 SAFA season as Hotham and the 1888 SAFA season as North Adelaide playing most of its matches at Kensington and Adelaide Ovals. In 1889 the Club merged with the Adelaide Football Club.

== Early history (1879 - 1885) ==
First recorded games of a club called Hotham were in 1879 against teams called Locomotives and St Peter's Cathedral.

On Saturday 26 July 1879, Hothams defeated a North Parks Second Twenty which resulted in a victory for them by one goal kicked by C. Presgrave to nil. For the winners Harkness, Connell, Woodcock, Everard, and Clarke played best.

An Annual General meeting was held at Wednesday 16 March 1881 at Princess Royal Hotel, North Adelaide during which it was agreed that they retain their Dark Blue Colours from the previous season.

At an Annual General meeting held at the Scotch Thistle Hotel, North Adelaide (Changed name to the Cathedral Hotel in 1925) on 7 April 1884 of the Hotham and Triton Football Clubs it was agreed that the Clubs would merge under the Hothams.

The following officers were then elected : — Patron, Mr. W. Bundey (Mayor of Adelaide); President, Mr. A. S. Devenish : Vice- Presidents — Messrs. G. Fuse, J. J. Hardy, C. S. Leader, G. Bickle, W. H.Woodcock, E. R. Simpson, W. Goldsworthy, J. F. Conigrave, T. Trathen, W. Cornell, and G.Downs, Drs. Nesbitt, Stirling, and Cawley; Captain, R. Crown: Vice-Captain, W. Charters; Secretary, S. Rickard; Assistant Secretary, W. Hammond; Treasurer, T. Turner; Committee—Captain, Secretary, Treasurer, and Messrs. Blackman, Hammond, Wilson, and Hall; Association Delegates— Messrs. Blackman, F. Rickard, and S. Rickard.

At annual general meeting held at Huntsman Hotel, North Adelaide, on 4 March 1885, it was reported out of 12 games – there were 5 wins and 7 losses.

== Adelaide and Suburban Association Premiers 1885-1886 ==
The club was premiers of the Adelaide and Suburban (Junior) Association in 1885 (winning all 12 games played) and 1886 after defeating Creswick in a Premiership Playoff.

1886 Adelaide and Suburban Association Premiership Playoff - Saturday 11 September 1886
Hotham 3-5 defeated Creswick 1–8 at Adelaide Oval. (Crowd 700)

== SAFA 1887 (Admission as Hotham) ==
In 1887 it was reported The opening meeting of the Hotham Football Club was held at the Oxford Hotel, North Adelaide, on March 2, Councillor Cohen in the chair. There were between 60 and 70 members present. Councillor Cohen was elected patron, and Councillor Downs as president. At the meeting it was decided to be represented by a team in the South Australian Football Association this year. About 20 new members were proposed. Mr. W. J. Hill was elected as secretary, but the positions of captain and vice-captain were left over until the first of the association matches.

== SAFA 1888 (Hotham renames to North Adelaide) ==
At a meeting held on 13 March 1888, after adopting a recommendation to merge with the Ariel Club, it was also unanimously agreed by members to also renamed the club from Hotham to North Adelaide for the 1888 season. The club would also add a blue hoop to their red and white guernseys and wear blue and white hose (so as not to clash with the new club Medindie whose colours were also Red and White). They were also strengthen by the inclusion of several members of the old 1887 West Adelaide whose colours had also been Red, White and Blue.

== Merger with Adelaide and Resignation from SAFA (1889 - 1894) ==
At North Adelaide's Annual General Meeting on 13 March 1889 it was resolved for officials to have merger discussions with the Medindie Club which had joined the SAFA the previous season.

On 22 March 1889 at a special meeting held at the Builders' Exchange, Greeham Street, in adjoining rooms the Adelaide Football Club and Hotham North Adelaide Club both met. It was unanimously decided at each meeting that the two clubs should unite as one body. The merged club retained the name Adelaide and red and black as its colours.

The Adelaide Club, which was originally formed as a new Senior Club in the SAFA from a merger of the North Adelaide Juniors and North Park Football Clubs in 1885, would later resign from the SAFA before the commencement of the 1894 Season.

== SAFA Honour Roll ==
1887 Leading Goalkicker - Hosken (13 goals)

1887 - 1888 Captain - Jack Reedman

== Notable Player Jack 'Dinny' Reedman ==
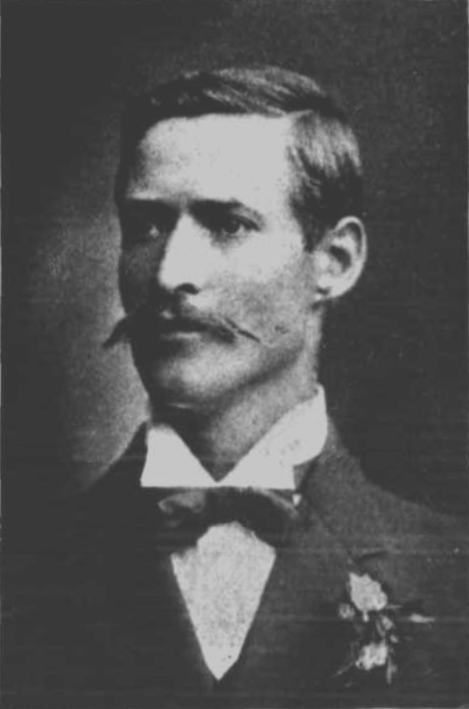
Jack 'Dinny' Reedman was captain of Hotham North Adelaide for 1887 and 1888 Seasons

Notable player for the club was the Captain for the 1887 and 1888 Seasons - Jack 'Dinny' Reedman. He moved to South Adelaide when Notham/North Adelaide merged with Adelaide for 1889. He also played and Captained North Adelaide Football Club (including Premierships in 1900, 1902 and 1905) and was a successful Coach at West Adelaide Football Club. Reedman held the SANFL games record of 319 until 1970. In 1996, he was inducted into the Australian Football Hall of Fame in 1996 and in 2002, he was inducted into the South Australian Football Hall of Fame. Reedman also played and Captain South Australia in Cricket and played one Test for Australia against England in the 1894-95 Season.
