= The River News =

Former weekly newspaper published in Waikerie, South Australia

The River News was a weekly newspaper published in Waikerie, South Australia, published from July 1956 until April 2020.

== History ==
The River News was begun on 19 July 1956 by Colin Hetzel of the Waikerie Printing House with his wife, Meg Hetzel, and was founded as a direct result of the 1956 Murray River floods. In an interview, Colin Hetzel stated that "All went well until there was the 1956 flood – and we could see that this was our opportunity to publish a local newspaper, as the only local paper was The Murray Pioneer (based at Renmark)."

The River News has had four editors in its history – Colin Hetzel, Jack Pick, John Pick, and Craig Treloar. The newspaper was sold to the Murray Pioneer in 1962 but retained an office on Peake Terrace, Waikerie. Along with The Bunyip, Murray Pioneer, and The Loxton News, The River News was owned by the Taylor Group of Newspapers based in Renmark.

In April 2020, the Taylor Group ceased publishing The River News. The final issue was published on 17 April 2020. Local news stories of interest to the Waikerie community are now published in Murray Pioneer.

== Distribution ==
As at April 2018, The River News had a circulation of 2250 and was distributed throughout Waikerie, Blanchetown, Morgan, Cadell, Galga, Mercunda, Mantung, and Maggea. Like other Taylor Group publications, the newspaper was also available online.

== Awards ==
During its run, the newspaper has won several awards; it won the best country newspaper (circulation under 2000) in 1971, the Conqueror Trophy for the best newspaper (under 5000 circulation) in 1975, the Ampol Award for best country newspaper (under 5000 circulation) in 1983, and the Country Press SA Inc. best newspaper (circulation under 2500) in 2007.

== Digitisation ==
Australian National Library carries images and text versions of the newspaper accessible using Trove, the on-line newspaper retrieval service.
