= Murray Pioneer =

Weekly newspaper in South Australia

The Murray Pioneer is a weekly newspaper published since 1892 in Renmark, South Australia. It is now owned by the Taylor Group of Newspapers.

== History ==
The forerunner of the newspaper was the Renmark Pioneer (9 April 1892 – 4 July 1913?), which was a weekly newspaper published in Renmark, South Australia. Originally published on a Saturday, it later appeared on Fridays. Its first issue was produced by the "chromograph" method (a gelatin pad transfer system); its second by a form of mimeograph, with advertisements printed using a Cyclostyle machine by its first editor, A. P. Corrie. An Albion press was later procured. The last issue which has been digitised by the National Library of Australia for its "Trove" service is dated 4 July 1913.

In 1913 it was renamed to the Murray Pioneer and Australian River Record subtitled "With which is incorporated The Renmark Pioneer" (which first appears in digitised form as the issue dated 2 January 1914; listed as Volume 19 No. 1 and Volume 1 No. 76 New series). In 1928, it absorbed rival publication The Loxton Clarion and Murray Lands Guardian from Jack Irving. In 1942, the name was simplified to the current title. In 1964, the newspaper bought out The Loxton News (28 April 1960 – present), also founded by Irving.

Along with The Bunyip, The River News, and The Loxton News, The Murray Pioneer is now owned by the Taylor Group of Newspapers.

After many years of publishing two editions (Tuesdays and Fridays) per week, in July 2019 the Murray Pioneer switched to a single Wednesday edition per week.

== Editors ==
Arthur Pitman Corrie (c. April 1871 – 9 September 1932) served an apprenticeship as a mechanic and worked at the Illawarra Mercury before founding the Renmark Pioneer in 1892. He guided its progress from chromograph through cyclostyle to a small printing press, though he never mastered the art of letterpress. He moved to Queensland, where he joined the Brisbane Daily Mail then in October 1914 enlisted with the AIF, and with the 1st Light Horse Field Ambulance saw action in the Middle East. He later became a Methodist minister, (another reference has him training as a Salvation Army Officer) and aside from his pastoral duties he was Maryborough correspondent for the Brisbane Courier. He married Flora Mary; they had one son, Leslie Robertson Corrie.

Christopher James Ashwell (c. 1850 – 27 June 1905) was on the staff of the Mildura Cultivator before becoming in 1896 the proprietor and editor of the Renmark Pioneer. He was particularly known in those towns as a chess enthusiast. He was largely responsible for founding the (community licensed) Renmark Hotel against the arguments of popular Baptist minister W. Corly Butler.

Harry Samuel Taylor (13 January 1873 – 13 February 1932) was a grandson of Samuel Smith, founder of Yalumba winery. He was educated at Prince Alfred College and began his working life as a teacher before becoming interested in horticulture. He married S. Helen Smith in 1897, took up an orchard on the River Murray. He progressed to journalism with the Mildura Cultivator (later named the Sunraysia Daily), writing as "H. S. T." and "The Rambler", before taking over the Pioneer in 1905. He was lauded by an editor of The Bunyip, another South Australian regional newspaper, as being well informed on foreign affairs, and uniquely cool headed during the Great War. He was an idealist who did not see his newspaper as a "money-making megaphone".

== "With Pipe and Book" ==
A regular book review, (Note: The title from a poem by Richard Le Gallienne) which also served as an editorial on cultural and political matters, ran from 26 April 1912 (conducted by "NORASTYL", another Taylor alias, abandoned after a few issues) to 16 August 1929. Issues commencing 8 July 1921 deal with Professor Coleman Phillipson's defence of the swingeing peace terms of the Treaty of Versailles, and are particularly prophetic.

== Distribution ==
Like other Taylor Group publications, the newspaper is also available online.
