= The Loxton News =

Weekly newspaper of Lexton, Australia

The Loxton News was a weekly newspaper published in Loxton, South Australia, and published continuously between April 1960 and April 2020.

== History ==
The earliest roots of what was to become The Loxton News began with the founding of the Loxton Clarion (1925–1928). Its proprietor, Jack Irving, endeavoured to produce a publication reflecting the concerns of Loxton and surrounding districts. Its articles covered crops, care of livestock, vehicle maintenance, and local sport.

Thirty years later, the Loxton Community Newsletter (June 1956–March 1960), published by The Loxton District War Memorial Community Centre, began publication monthly as a separate (i.e. non-Irving) publication. In April 1960, this newspaper was incorporated into the newly formed Loxton News (first issued 28 April 1960), since Irving had come out of retirement to found a new newspaper published in Loxton by J.C. Irving & Co., Ltd.

In 1964 it was sold to the Murray Pioneer, with publishing later relocating from its East Terrace location to premises on Riverside Avenue in Berri. Along with The Bunyip, The Murray Pioneer, and The River News, The Loxton News was subsequently owned by the Taylor Group of Newspapers and printed in Renmark.

In April 2020, however, the Taylor Group ceased publishing The Loxton News. The final issue was published on 16 April 2020. Local news stories of interest to the Loxton community are now published in the Murray Pioneer.

== Distribution ==
The Loxton News was published weekly, on Wednesdays, and had a circulation of 2,400 copies as at April 2018. The newspaper's distribution included: Barmera, Berri, Renmark, Waikerie, Moorook, Kingston-On-Murray, and Northern Mallee towns including Alawoona, Mindarie, Karoonda, Wanbi and Wunkar. Like other Taylor Group publications, the newspaper was also available online.

== Awards ==
During its run, The Loxton News won around 24 Country Press SA awards. Of these awards, 15 were for the best newspaper in its circulation category (the first in 1963 and the last in 2010). Other awards are for excellence in journalism, graphic design, advertising features and outstanding community involvement.

== Digitisation ==
Australian National Library carries images and text versions of the newspaper from 1960 accessible using Trove, the on-line newspaper retrieval service.
