= Gawler Primary School =

School in South Australia

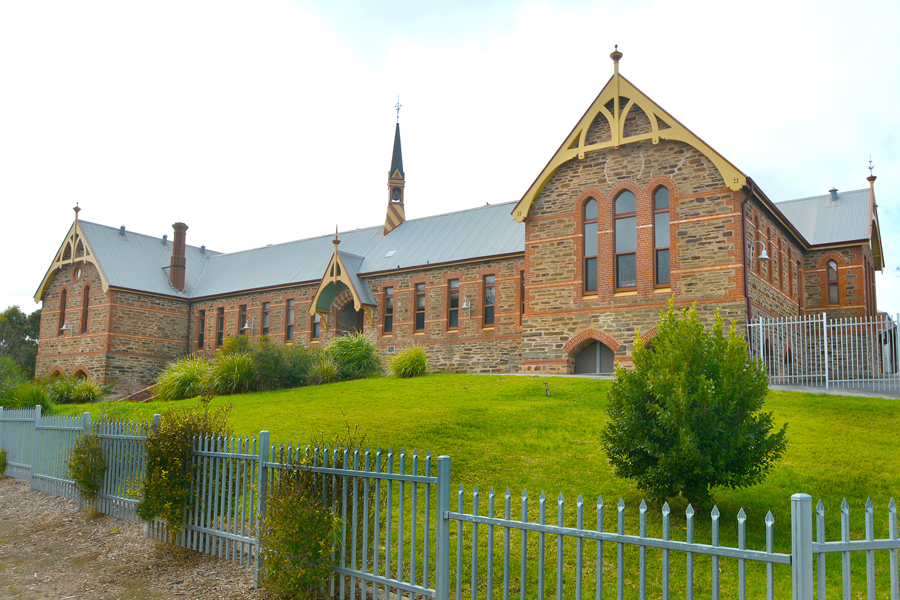

Information
- Motto: Honouring the past, embracing the future
- Established: 1878
- Principal: Celeste Matthews
- Enrollment: 165 (2023)
- Website: https://gawlerps.sa.edu.au/

Gawler Primary School is a public coeducational primary school, located on the edge of the historic Church Hill State Heritage Area of Gawler in the town of Gawler in South Australia. It is administered by the Department of Education, with an enrolment of 165 students and a teaching staff of 11, as of 2023. The school caters to students from Reception to Year 6.

== History ==
It opened in January 1878. Opened as the Gawler Public School, it was built by William Tardiff to the design of architect E. J. Wood at a cost of 4,695 pounds and could accommodate 600 pupils. The first headmaster was E. L. Burton who had been headmaster of St. George's Church of England Day School.

== See also ==
- List of schools in South Australia
