= Jack Reedman =

Australian sportsman

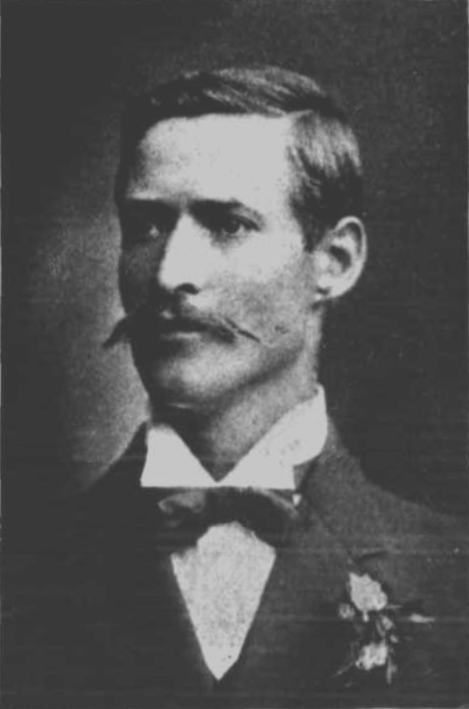

Personal information
- Full name: John Cole Reedman
- Born: 9 October 1865; Gilberton, South Australia
- Died: 29 March 1924 (aged 58); North Adelaide, South Australia
- Nickname: Dinny
- Batting: Right-handed
- Bowling: Right-arm medium

International information
- National side: Australia
- Only Test (cap 68): 14 December 1894 v England

Career statistics
Competition	Tests	First-class
Matches	1	81
Runs scored	21	3338
Batting average	10.50	23.34
100s/50s	0/0	2/15
Top score	17	113
Balls bowled	57
Wickets	1	118
Bowling average	24.00	32.10
5 wickets in innings	0	6
10 wickets in match	0	1
Best bowling	1/12	7/54
Catches/stumpings	1/0	68/0
- Source: Cricinfo

John Cole Reedman (9 October 1865 – 29 March 1924) was a leading Australian sportsman of the late nineteenth and early twentieth century. 'Dinny' Reedman was an all-round sportsman who, in addition to his football exploits, was a long-distance swimmer, captained South Australia's Sheffield Shield cricket team and played cricket at Test level.

== Australian football career ==
Reedman began to make his mark as an Australian rules footballer in 1884, whilst playing parklands football for Medindie. He went on to join Hotham who were in the Adelaide Suburban Association (ASA) competition, and was a key member of the club's 1885 premiership side. He captained Hotham when they again won the ASA premiership in 1886.

Hotham joined the South Australian Football Association (SAFA) in 1887, with Reedman as captain. Just prior to the 1888 football season, Hotham changed their name to North Adelaide (no connection to the current club) and again Reedman was captain.

When Hotham/North Adelaide amalgamated with the Adelaide club in 1889, Reedman moved to South Adelaide, where he was appointed captain, a position he held until 1898, playing 172 consecutive matches (bringing his total to 200) and leading South to five premierships in seven years before the introduction of electorate football (whereby footballers had to play for their local team) forced his move to North Adelaide in 1899. Reedman led North Adelaide from 1901 to 1905, and in that time the club won premierships in 1902 and 1905, with Reedman also being part of the 1900 premiership team. He also captained South Australia in 1903, and in 1907 played both his 300th game - only the second ever player in elite Australian rules football to do so - as well as his 306th game to break the elite Australian rules football games record held by Victorian Peter Burns.

Following his retirement from playing, Reedman was appointed coach of the lowly West Adelaide Football Club in 1908. To the end of 1907, West Adelaide had won only 23 and drawn 1 of the 145 SAFA matches they had played, and had been perennially close to or on the bottom of the ladder. Reedman coached West Adelaide to its first ever premiership in 1908, and then defeated Victorian Football League (VFL) premiers Carlton Football Club to become Champions of Australia. Reedman promptly left West Adelaide to return to North Adelaide for one last season as a player at the age of 43, but it was an inauspicious finale, as the red and whites finished second last.

Reedman played 115 matches for North Adelaide, bringing his career total to 319 matches, which remained a record in South Australian elite football until it was broken by Lindsay Head in 1970, while his 200 consecutive matches was a record in elite football until it was broken by Jack Titus in 1943.

His brother Sid also captained South Adelaide.

== Cricket career ==
Reedman made his first-class cricket debut for South Australia on 17 February 1888 against Victoria at the Adelaide Oval. An all-rounder, Reedman made a duck in his only innings of the match and did not bowl as South Australia won by an innings and 113 runs. Despite this inauspicious start, Reedman went on to captain South Australia and represent Australia in one Test match against England, at the Sydney Cricket Ground (SCG) during the 1894/95 Ashes series. Reedman made 17 and four and produced bowling figures of 1/12 and 0/12. Between 1887/88 to 1908/09 he played for South Australia 76 times, 9 of those as captain.

== Honours ==
Reedman has been selected as a back pocket and change ruckman in South Adelaide's official "Greatest Team". In 1996, he was inducted into the Australian Football Hall of Fame and in 2002, he was inducted into the South Australian Football Hall of Fame.

The J Reedman Memorial Drinking Fountain was erected in Creswell Gardens, Adelaide Oval, on 7 September 1929. It is made of Angaston marble and signifies the achievements of John Cole Reedman and was opened by Sir Wallace Bruce. The fountain was restored in 2001 with an extra plaque added.

== Personal life ==
Reedman lived on Gilbert Street, Gilberton and worked as a letter sorter in Adelaide with the Postal Department. He also coached the cricket and football teams at Prince Alfred College for many years. He died in the morning on 29 March 1924 aged 58 following an operation at a private hospital, after several years of ill-health, leaving a widow, three sons and a daughter.

== See also ==
- List of Australian rules football and cricket players
- List of South Australian representative cricketers

== Sources ==
- Atkinson, Graeme (1982). Everything You've Ever Wanted to Know About Australian Rules Football, But Couldn't Be Bothered Asking. Melbourne: Five Mile Press. ISBN 978-0-86788-009-0.
- Hutchinson, Garrie; Geddes, Margaret (1999). Ross, John (ed.). Australian Football League's Hall of Fame. Pymble, NSW: HarperCollins Publishers. p. 111. ISBN 978-0-7322-6426-0.
