= Thomas Smellie (minister) =

Rev. Thomas Smellie (pronounced "smiley") ( – ) was a Presbyterian minister and educator in South Australia.

== History ==
Smellie was sent out to South Australia by the Free Presbyterian Church of Scotland to replace Rev. Peter Mercer, minister of the Port Adelaide church on the north-west corner of Marryatt and Leadenhall streets, who had transferred to Victoria to become first acting principal of Ormond College of the University of Melbourne.

Smellie arrived aboard Irene on 21 October 1861 and was formally welcomed by the congregations of the Port Adelaide church on 4 November and Chalmers Church a week later and ordained and inducted into the Port Adelaide church on 16 December 1861. He resigned before the 1865 union which formed the Presbyterian Church of South Australia, but stayed on until replaced by Rev. James Henderson on 18 April 1867.

Smellie taught Latin at Adelaide Educational Institution from 1863 to 1866, and St Peter's College in 1866. He advertised for private tuition in mathematics and the Classics at his home, Wakefield Street, in the year 1867–1868.

He founded Gawler Academy on Church Hill, Gawler, around June 1868 with 28 pupils, assisted by Mrs. Smellie and L. S. Burton (died 1895). The school closed in December 1871 prior to his return to Great Britain. James Gordon S.M. was a notable student.

His licence to marry was rescinded in 1870.

Smellie and his wife returned to Britain aboard South Australian in 1872.

== Other interests ==
- He was an active member of the Aborigines' Friends' Association

== Family ==
Smellie married Louise Suzanne Wilhelmine Verdure (29 Jul 1832 – ) at Chalmers Church on 18 December 1866. Louise was a daughter of Pierre Jean Isidore Verdure, of Paris
