= Leonard Samuel Burton =

South Australia educator

Leonard Samuel Burton (6 January 1824 – 23 February 1895), Generally known as L. S. Burton, was an educator in Gawler, South Australia.

== History ==
Burton was born in Chester, England, the eldest son of William Burton from Dent, Yorkshire. He was educated at the King's School, Chester and worked as a pharmacist. He married Eliza Hope and emigrated to South Australia aboard Rajah, arriving in April 1850.

In September he was appointed to the Pulteney Street school as under-master to E. K. Miller. He then ran an Education Department school at Saddleworth before in June 1853 accepting the position of headmaster of the school (established 1850) attached to St George's (Anglican) Church, Gawler. St. George's School, on the north side of Orleana Square, operated on a non-denominational basis in order to qualify for Government assistance; a separate room for girls was added in 1857, and a new school building was erected around 1865. Under Burton's stewardship the school gained a high reputation and attracted students from far afield.

In 1869 he taught at the Gawler Academy, conducted by Rev. Thomas Smellie.

With the Education Act of 1875, small private schools such as St George's were put under competition from State schools, and Burton accepted headmastership of the new Gawler Model School, and St George's folded. Two and a half years later Burton resigned from the Department and re-opened St George's School. Then around December 1893 he moved the school to his private residence.

Mrs Burton died on 21 February 1893 after being an invalid for 17 years.

== Other interests ==
Burton was deeply involved with various activities in Gawler: He was

- a member of the Humbug Society, with E. L. Grundy, George Isaacs, J. P. Stow, and Dr. George Nott
- vice-president of the football and cricket clubs
- treasurer of the Gawler Institute
- hon. secretary to the Gawler Auxiliary of the British and Foreign Bible Society
- co-auditor (with Mr Warren) of the Gawler Town and Suburban Building and Investment Society.
- appointed Justice of the Peace
- trustee of St George's Church
- treasurer of the Gawler Agricultural Society
- a co-auditor of the Gawler Corporation
- from 1881 a councillor for the North Ward, Gawler Council for much of the remainder of his life, and mayor in 1884–1885 and 1887–1888

While mayor he was also

- President of the Gawler Cricket Club and vice-president of the Football Club.
- President of the Gawler Bicycle Club
- President of the Gawler Chess Club
- patron of the Gawler Comedy Company
- treasurer of the Gawler Political Science Association

== Death ==
Burton and George Warren were riding in a trap when they failed to stop for a railway train at the twenty-nine-mile crossing, near Roseworthy. The horse was killed outright and the two occupants were thrown to the ground, Burton being killed immediately and Warren sustaining serious injuries. The driver of the trap had ignored the signals of the crossing-keeper (a Mrs Cullen) and attempted to outrun the train, or had been unable to bring the horse to a halt.

== Notable students ==
- Henry Edward Bright, jr
- Ephraim Henry Coombe, newspaper editor and parliamentarian
- Robert Henry Barnet, newspaper proprietor
