= Jefferson Stow =

Newspaper editor, magistrate and politician in South Australia (1830–1908)

Jefferson Pickman Stow (4 September 1830 – 4 May 1908), commonly referred to as J. P. Stow, was a newspaper editor and magistrate in South Australia.

Stow was born at Buntingford, Hertfordshire, England the second son of the Rev. Thomas Quentin Stow and his wife Elizabeth, née Eppes. Jefferson Stow came to South Australia with his parents and brothers ( Randolph Isham Stow and Augustine Stow) in 1837. After engaging in farming pursuits, he went to the Victorian diggings in 1856.

In 1859, at a time of reduced business activity, Stow and George Isaacs founded in Gawler a social club they called the "Humbug Society", with no other purpose than to poke fun at hypocrisy and self-aggrandisement in convivial surroundings. The club met at George Causby's Globe Hotel, where also met various fraternal societies, who became, with their regalia and pompous ceremonies, the targets of some good-humored "humbug" banter. The club adopted the bunyip as its emblem, and published a club newsletter under that banner, which became locally famous for its wit and lighthearted comments on the news of the week. This publication became The Bunyip, which continued well into the 21st century.

In 1864, Stow traveled privately, as representative of some investors in the Northern Territory, to Escape Cliffs, where of a party of 40 under B. T. Finniss was to establish a settlement named Palmerston at the mouth of the Adelaide River. A year later, disillusioned with the prospects of that location, he was one of a party of seven who sailed from Adam Bay to Champion Bay in Western Australia in a small ship's boat they dubbed the Forlorn Hope. Before leaving, he sent off for publication in The Advertiser a litany of negative observations on the site chosen, and particularly on Finniss as a leader. An account of this expedition was published by Stow, who was immediately appointed to the staff of The Advertiser, and in 1876 was appointed editor in succession to William Harcus.

Stow was the author of "South Australia: its History, Productions and Natural Resources," compiled at the request of the South Australian government for circulation at the Calcutta International Exhibition (1883), and published that year. It is a well written and concise manual, and has had an extensive circulation in Australia, England and India. Stow was appointed a magistrate in 1884, and in 1886 Commissioner of Insolvency, and Special and Stipendiary Magistrate at Mount Gambier, South Australia and later at Port Pirie. Stow retired in 1904; he died on 4 May 1908 at North Adelaide, survived by his wife, two sons and five daughters.
