= George Isaacs (author) =

Australian author

George Samuel Isaacs (5 January 1825 – 14 February 1876) was an Australian writer. Born in England to a Jewish family, he moved to Adelaide, South Australia with his wife and child in 1851. Often writing under the pseudonym "A Pendragon", Isaacs' 1856 novel, The Queen of the South became the first novel to be published in South Australia, and his play Burlesque of Frankenstein is recognised as the first Australian work of science fiction.

While in South Australia he founded The Critic, and contributed to other publications such as The Bunyip and The Observer.
