= West Adelaide Football Club (1878–1887) =

Names
- Full name: West Adelaide Football Club
- Former name: West Torrens Football Club

Club details
- Founded: 1878
- Dissolved: 5 April 1888; 138 years ago
- Colours: Red White Blue
- Competition: South Australian Football Association (1887)
- Premierships: 1882 Adelaide and Suburban Association
- Ground: West Park Lands, Mile End, South Australia

The West Adelaide Football Club (1887), previously known as the West Torrens Football Club (1878-1886), was an Australian rules football club that participated in the South Australian Football Association during the 1887 SAFA season.

== West Torrens Football Club - early history (1871) ==
The earliest history was a report of a football match that was played on the West Park Lands on a holiday held on Wednesday, May 24, 1871 by 24 members of the West Torrens Football Club, 12 of whom were chosen from Thebarton, and the same number from Mile-End. The former wore blue and the latter pink. Mr. E. J. Ronald acted as captain for the Blues, and Mr. E. Hemingway for the Pinks. The Blues were the first to kick off the ball, and after about three hours good play they managed to secure a goal by a lucky kick from G. M. Dew. They then adjourned to the Wheatsheaf Inn, Thebarton where Mr McCreeth was voted to the chair, and Mr. G. Fisher the vice-chair.

== Early matches (1878) ==
A number of matches in 1878 were reported including West Torrens v. South Adelaide (Second Twenty) on Saturday, July 27.

These two Clubs met on the ground of the former. The game, which was very lively, resulted in a draw, neither side obtaining a goal. The respective captains were Messrs. J. Beesley and T. N. Cole. Mr. R.Paget officiated as field umpire.

== SAFA application rejected (1879) ==
West Torrens Football Club submitted an application to the join the SAFA but at the Association's Annual General Meeting held on 1 April 1879 the club's application was rejected by 12 votes to 19 against as a number of delegates felt there was already too many weak teams in the Association.

== Annual dinners and season reports ==
The club's first annual dinner took place with about 50 members present at the Foresters' and Squatters' Arms, Thebarton, on Thursday evening. October 14, 1879. Mr. J. Beesley was captain and secretary and he reported eight matches had been played with the following result: Won, three; drawn, three; lost, two. Four of the matches were with SAFA first twenties, and of these one was won, one was drawn, and two were lost.

Annual General Meeting of the West Torrens club was held on April 7, 1881, at Squatters Arms, Thebarton.

== Adelaide and Suburban (Junior) Association (1882 to 1886) ==
1882 - The West Torrens and North Parks were undoubtedly considered the premier clubs of the Junior Association. It was reported that they tried conclusions on the ground of the former at Mile End on Saturday last (27th May). The meeting of these crack teams had the effect of tempting a number of people to face the wintry weather and watch the sport.

1882 - West Torrens 3 goals defeated North Parks 2 goals for the Junior Premiership. Several old senior players from various clubs were competing.

1883 - West Torrens played ten Association matches, winning eight, and losing two, and two bad been forfeited to them. They occupied the second place on the scoring list, and tied for the cup; they had kicked forty-nine goals against their opponents fourteen.

1884 - West Torrens played twelve matches during the season, winning eight and losing four. Thirty-one goals and 114 behind had been kicked by them against their opponents' 9 goals and 32 behinds. West Torrens finished the season in third place behind North Parks and Adelaide which would merge at the end of the season and join the SAFA as a Senior Club in 1885. The West Torrens club had also played matches with three senior SAFA teams, the South Adelaide, Norwood and South Parks, and in each instance had scored a win.

1885 - West Torrens came second with 10 wins behind Hotham which recorded 12 wins having won all of the matches in which they took part. West Torrens losing both of their matches to Hotham. North Parks (Adelaide Junior Team) took third place with 6 wins, 5 losses and 1 draw.

== Club renames from West Torrens to West Adelaide and joins SAFA (1887) ==
On 15 March 1887 the West Torrens Football Club held a meeting at the Foundry Hotel, Hindley Street in Adelaide where it decided to change the name of the club to West Adelaide and apply for inclusion in the upcoming 1887 SAFA season. The following office bearers were elected: Patron, Mr. C. C. Kingston; president, Mr. A. A. Fox; vice-presidents, several; and secretary and treasurer, Mr, A. Monck.

The club was nicknamed “The Butchers” because some of the team's players were slaughtermen and the club played matches near the West Park slaughterhouse situated behind the Adelaide Gaol.

Team colours for the SAFA 1887 season were red, white and blue. Initially the team wore red and in 1881 red and white.

Summary of their only SAFA season - Finished in last place. Played 16 Won 1 Drew 2 Lost 13 (Win and Draw against Gawler and Draw against Hotham). Goals scored 18 - Behinds 52. 114 Goals and 288 behinds against. Top Goal kicker - Welsby 6 goals.

== Resignation from SAFA (1888) ==
At the annual general meeting of the S.A. Football Association that was held at the Prince Alfred Hotel on Thursday evening 5 April 1888 - A letter was received from the late Secretary to the West Adelaide Club, stating that as the club was unable to get together a team they desired to resign from the Association. The resignation was accepted with regret.
