= 2015 Pinery bushfire =

Bushfire in the 2015–16 Australian bushfire season

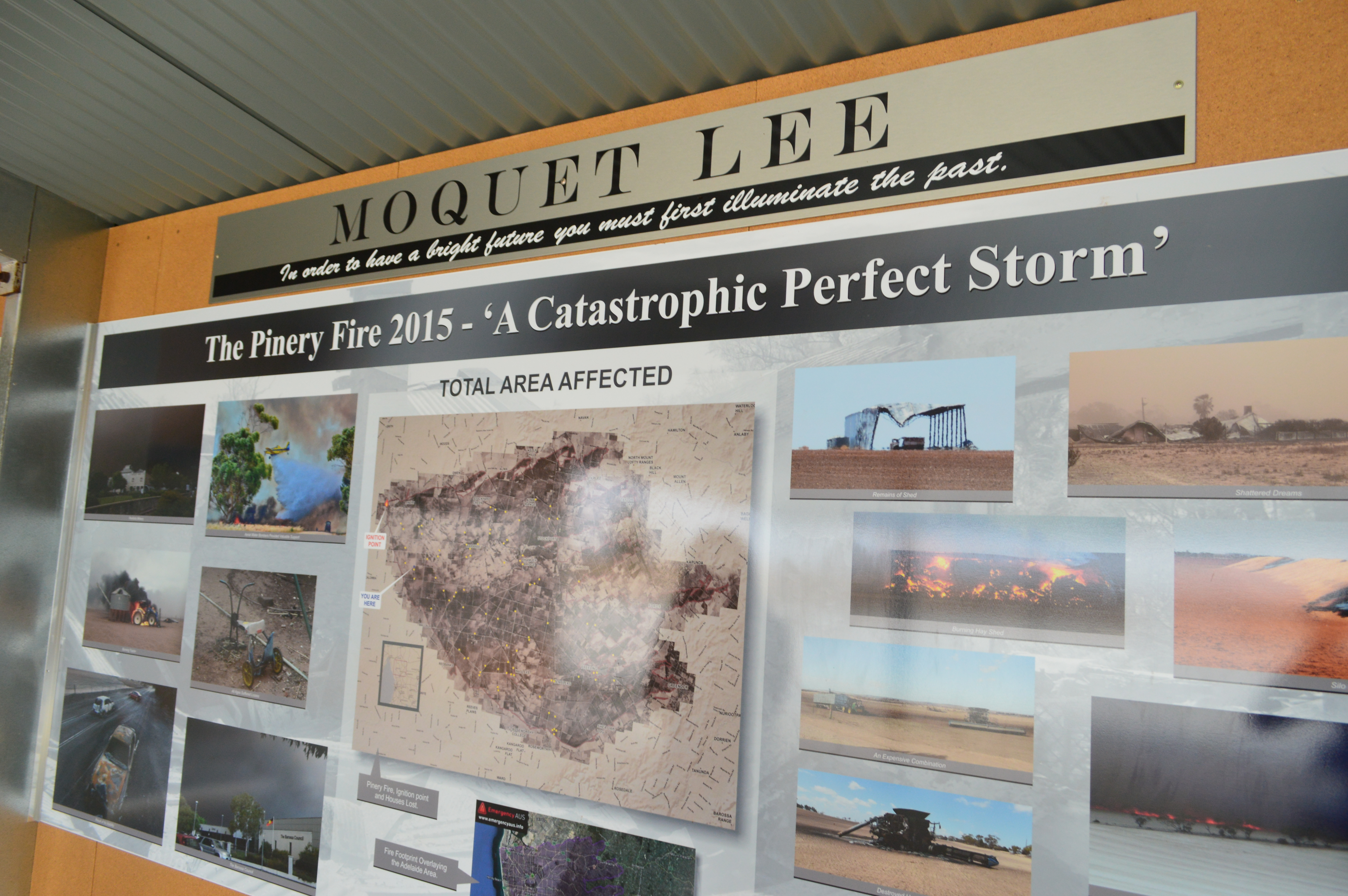
- Pinery Fire Memorial, Grace Plains
- Date: 25 November 2015 – 2 December 2015
- Location: Lower Mid North, Light River and west Barossa, South Australia, Australia
- Coordinates: 34°18′36″S 138°25′26″E (ignition point)

Statistics
- Burned area: More than 85,000 hectares (210,000 acres)
- Land use: Residential; Farmland; Forest reserves

Impacts
- Deaths: 2
- Injuries: 90; including 5 critical
- Structures destroyed: 470+; 91 houses; 388 non-residential structures; 98 vehicles; 93 items of farm machinery
- Cost: A$170 million

Ignition
- Cause: Car battery left in paddock

Map
- Location of the ignition starting point of the bushfire, in South Australia

The 2015 Pinery bushfire was a bushfire that burned from 25 November to 2 December 2015, and primarily affected the Lower Mid North and west Barossa Valley regions immediately north of Gawler in the Australian state of South Australia. At least 86,000 hectares (210,000 acres) of scrub and farmland in the council areas of Light, Wakefield, Clare and Gilbert Valleys, and Mallala were burned during its duration.

On 25 November, during the major run of the Pinery fire, two fatalities occurred; Janet Hughes, 56, perished while fleeing in a vehicle outside Hamley Bridge; Allan Tiller, 69, perished while fighting the fire on a neighbour's property in Pinery itself. A further 90 people were hospitalized as a result of the fire, with five of the victims suffering critical injuries.

The Pinery fire destroyed or rendered uninhabitable 91 houses, and completely destroyed 388 non-residential structures, 93 pieces of farm machinery and 98 other vehicles. It also caused significant damage to rural produce; 53,000 poultry and 17,500 head of livestock perished and up to A$40 million worth of fodder and unharvested grains were destroyed. Communities affected by the fire included Barabba, Daveyston, Freeling, Greenock, Hamley Bridge, Kapunda, Magdala, Mallala, Nain, Nuriootpa, Owen, Pinery, Pinkerton Plains, Redbanks, Roseworthy, Stockport, Tarlee, Templers, Wasleys and Woolsheds.

== Climate and weather setting ==
Daily maximum temperatures were the highest on record for October in South Australia, averaging +5.61 °C above the mean.

Daily rainfall records for November were observed across a large number of stations in the agricultural districts of South Australia on 4–5 November, with daily totals ranging from 30 millimetres (1.2 in) to 80 millimetres (3.1 in) over large areas; Tarlee observed a record 69.9 millimetres (2.75 in) falling on 5 November. Several communities within the eventual fire ground recorded their highest November rainfall in at least 30 years; Tarlee observed the wettest November since 1971, with 79.8 millimetres (3.14 in). However, extremely low rainfall was observed after 5 November and prior to the fire; 0.5 millimetres (0.020 in) at Nuriootpa and 1.6 millimetres (0.063 in) at Roseworthy.

The record rainfall in early November prompted growth of both agricultural crops and other plant material, which increased the fuel load across the fire ground. More plant material was present in the fire ground than later in the fire season, as the fire occurred during a spring harvest period with predicted wheat yields of near the long-term average. During the rest of November, this organic material quickly dried out as South Australia recorded mean temperatures in the warmest 10% of years, due in part to two high pressure systems that moved eastwards across southeastern Australia on 18–20 November and on 21–23 November. Large areas of the state recorded daily maximum temperatures of +12 °C above average during the passage of both systems; on 18 November, Roseworthy recorded 41.6 °C (106.9 °F) and, on 19 November, Nuriootpa recorded 38.9 °C (102.0 °F).

=== Weather on 25 November ===
The day prior to ignition of the Pinery fire, the Country Fire Service issued a warning for "Extreme" fire conditions in the Mid-North and Mount Lofty Ranges and declared a total fire ban in both regions for 25 November.

The weather conditions around the Pinery fire on 25 November have been described as "catastrophic"; sustained north-westerly winds of 50–60 kilometres per hour (31–37 mph) and reputed gusts of up to 90 kilometres per hour (56 mph) are believed to have fanned the fire front in a run of over 50 kilometres (31 mi) in the first 4 hours. At Nuriootpa, the Bureau of Meteorology observed a maximum wind gust of 72 kilometres per hour (45 mph) from the northwest at 13:25 ACDT (UTC+10:30), the highest recording in November 2015. 81 kilometres per hour (50 mph) from the west-north-west at 13:31 ACDT (UTC+10:30) was the highest recorded wind speed at Roseworthy that month, and the relative humidity of 11% at 9:00 ACDT (UTC+10:30) was also the lowest that month.

At approximately 15:00 ACDT (UTC+10:30) the fire ground was affected by a cold front that passed across the entirety of southern Australia. The fire had initially spread to the south-east on a long narrow front, and when the cold front caused the prevailing wind to change direction, the long eastern flank became a broad front and the fire spread rapidly to the east and north. The wind at Roseworthy was observed as having shifted to 54 kilometres per hour (34 mph) from the west-south-west, and the mean sea level pressure had fallen to a low of 999.4 at 15:00 ACDT (UTC+10:30).

== Fire timeline ==
Around noon on 25 November, the Pinery fire was started by a spark from a car battery in a paddock bordering Plains Road and Port Lorne Road in the lower Mid North wheat-growing locality of Pinery, 70 kilometres (43 mi) due north of Adelaide's centre. Shortly after noon, the first alert message for the Pinery fire was issued by the Country Fire Service, the fire burning west of Avon on Port Lorne Road. The warning was upgraded 10 minutes later to emergency level, with the fire burning in a south-easterly direction and impacting on properties around Mallala. According to a Pinery farmer who spoke to the Australian Broadcasting Corporation's Landline program, local farmers were "...confronted with two kilometres of 30-foot-high wall of flame." An hour later the emergency warning area was expanded to include Magdala, Pinkerton Plains, Redbanks, Wasleys and Woolsheds as the fire moved in a south-easterly direction, and by 14:30 ACDT (UTC+10:30) the fire was impacting properties in the areas around Gawler, Hewett and Roseworthy.

However, a wind change passed the fire ground at approximately 15:00 ACDT (UTC+10:30), causing the fire front to expand in a northerly direction, and by 15:17 ACDT (UTC+10:30) the fire was traveling in a north-easterly direction towards Barabba, Freeling, Greenock, Hamley Bridge, Kapunda, Nuriootpa, Owen and Tarlee. At 16:25 ACDT (UTC+10:30), the area placed under an emergency warning was expanded again to include Dutton, Eudunda, Marrabel and Riverton. A worker at a piggery between Wasleys and Mallala reportedly "...drove 120 kilometres per hour in one direction away from the fire, before seeing the wind swing around and having to double back in the opposite direction." The man, who spoke to the Australian Broadcasting Corporation described "...flames taller than buildings". The members of three Country Fire Service brigades were trapped between Wasleys and Mallala during the wind change and sheltered in their vehicles during a burn over, however there were no injuries.

At 21:30 ACDT (UTC+10:30) all warnings for the Pinery fire were downgraded to "watch and act", however the fire had already impacted directly on property as far north as Tarlee, as far east as Belvidere and as far south as Roseworthy. By 26 November, approximately 400 firefighters and 70 firefighting appliances had been deployed to fight the fire and both the Horrocks and Thiele Highways were closed to all but emergency traffic. On 2 December, eight days after ignition, all warnings for the fire ceased; the fire had burned property across a fire front of over 210 kilometres (130 mi). During the entire duration of the fire, at least 1,700 firefighters and volunteers were deployed, including a large interstate deployment of strike teams from Victoria's Country Fire Authority (CFA).

== Aftermath ==
There were two human fatalities during the Pinery fire, both on the afternoon of 25 November. Janet Hughes, 56, was trapped in her car on Owen Road outside Hamley Bridge and died at the scene. Fellow residents believed Mrs. Hughes was attempting to reach her partner, who was at work in nearby Balaklava, when her car left the road and ignited. While assisting another man to defend a neighbor's property, Allan Tiller, 69, was overcome by the fire front in a Pinery paddock and died of his injuries at the scene.

Significant damage was caused to numerous communities across an 86,000 hectares (210,000 acres) area in the council areas of Light, Wakefield, Clare and Gilbert Valleys, and Mallala. At least 91 houses were destroyed or rendered uninhabitable by fire damage during the Pinery fire, the vast majority during the initial six hours after ignition. In the town of Wasleys, a lawn bowls club and a post office were gutted by the fire. Also destroyed were 388 non-residential buildings, 98 vehicles and 93 pieces of farm machinery. Numerous civilian vehicles were destroyed along the Horrocks, Sturt and Thiele highways as people attempted to flee; approximately 110 kilometres (68 mi) of roads and roads infrastructure—including bridges and signage—were damaged or destroyed by the fire.

The fire had a catastrophic impact upon the rural industry of Lower Mid North, Light River and west Barossa regions. A large quantity of livestock perished in the fire, including 53,600 poultry, 17,000 sheep, 500 pigs, 87 cattle, 19 horses and three Alpaca. Many of the livestock were buried in mass graves across the region. Approximately two-thirds of the area burned in the Pinery fire was estimated to have been paddocks and fields of produce; 120,000 tonnes of agricultural crops—including wheat, barley, canola, lentils and chickpeas—with a value of up to A$40 million were destroyed.

On 17 March 2016, winds of up to 90 kilometres per hour (56 mph) during a thunderstorm that passed over the fire ground created a dust storm, which affected towns in the mid-north of South Australia and in the Barossa Valley.

=== Aid and recovery ===
Those in the Light, Wakefield, Clare and Gilbert Valleys, and Mallala council areas who suffered loss or injury as a result of the fires were able to claim a one-off Disaster Recovery Payment and, in some cases, a 13-week Disaster Recovery Allowance, both provided by the State Government of South Australia.

$A84,000 was donated by businesses and the community to the RSPCA, which then allocated the funds to the University of Adelaide's School of Animal and Veterinary Sciences and the Veterinary Health Centres to treat pets and livestock injured in the blaze.

== See also ==
- Bushfires in Australia
- List of Australian bushfire seasons

== Bibliography ==
- Bureau of Meteorology (2015a). Monthly Weather Review – Australia; October 2015 (PDF). Melbourne, Victoria: Commonwealth of Australia.
- Bureau of Meteorology (2015b). Monthly Weather Review – Australia; November 2015 (PDF). Melbourne, Victoria: Commonwealth of Australia.
