= Woolshed (disambiguation) =

A woolshed is another name for a shearing shed.

Woolshed or Woolsheds may also refer to:

- Woolsheds, South Australia northwest of Gawler
- Woolshed Flat, South Australia, northwest of Rhynie in the southern Clare Valley
- Woolshed, Queensland, suburb of Ipswich
- Woolshed Flat, Victoria near Bendigo, Victoria

== See also ==
- Woolshed Flat (disambiguation)
