= Woolshed Flat =

Woolshed Flat may refer to the following places in Australia:

- Woolshed Flat, South Australia, a locality
- Woolshed Flat, Victoria, a locality in the Shire of Loddon
- A railway station serving the Pichi Richi Railway
- Woolshed Flat Railway Bridge, a railway bridge in Quorn, South Australia

== See also ==
- Woolshed (disambiguation)
