= Fischer, South Australia =

Fischer South Australia
- Coordinates: 34.49°S 138.62°E
- Population: 78 (SAL 2021)
- Postcode(s): 5502
- LGA(s): Adelaide Plains Council
- State electorate(s): Schubert
- Federal division(s): Grey
Localities around Fischer:
	Pinkerton Plains
Redbanks	Fischer	Woolsheds
	Reeves Plains

Fischer is a locality in the lower Mid North of South Australia between Gawler and Mallala. Its boundaries were set in 1997 to conform to the long-established local usage of the name. Like many places in South Australia, the name draws from the early settlers that migrated from Prussia (Germany) in the middle of the 19th century to take up land grants in the then new British colony of South Australia. Britain and Prussia were at that time staunch allies, having combined to defeat the French armies of Napoleon at the Battle of Waterloo in 1815. That era resulted in much of the British Royal family and the colony of South Australia being descendant from Prussian stock. The Fischer family settled the area after arrival on one of the early colonial ships. By the 20th century, the Fischer family was farming much of the area. In the 1970s or 1980s the SA Government released a plan for the area to feature a new satellite city, to relieve the pressure on the expanding capital Adelaide, to the south. The family farm of J H (Gordon) Fischer was subdivided and sold in smaller hobby farm allotments. A number of the original farm structures remain.
