= Reeves Plains Power Station =

Australian proposed power station

- Country: Australia
- Coordinates: 34.504°S 138.611°E
- Status: Proposed
- Construction cost: A$450M
- Owner: Alinta Energy
- Operator: Alinta Energy

Thermal power station
- Primary fuel: Natural gas
- Secondary fuel: Diesel
- Turbine technology: Gas turbine

Power generation
- Make and model: General Electric LM6000 PF Sprint
- Units planned: Six
- Nameplate capacity: Up to 300 MW

Reeves Plains Power Station is a proposal from Alinta Energy to build a gas-fired power station at Reeves Plains between Gawler and Mallala in South Australia. The proposed site borders both the Moomba-Adelaide gas pipe and an electricity transmission line. The power station is proposed to use six gas turbines to produce up to 300 megawatts (400,000 hp) of electricity. It is expected to be operated as a peaking plant rather than running full time. The primary source of fuel will be the gas pipeline, however the plant will also be able to operate on diesel fuel, and will have diesel storage on site. Stage 1 is expected to only be two or three of the turbines, generating 100 to 150 MW of electricity. The power station was originally expected to take 12 months to build, and be commissioned in January 2019. An extension of time request granted an additional 12 months in February 2019, but as of November 2019, the Alinta board had not yet decided to make the investment.

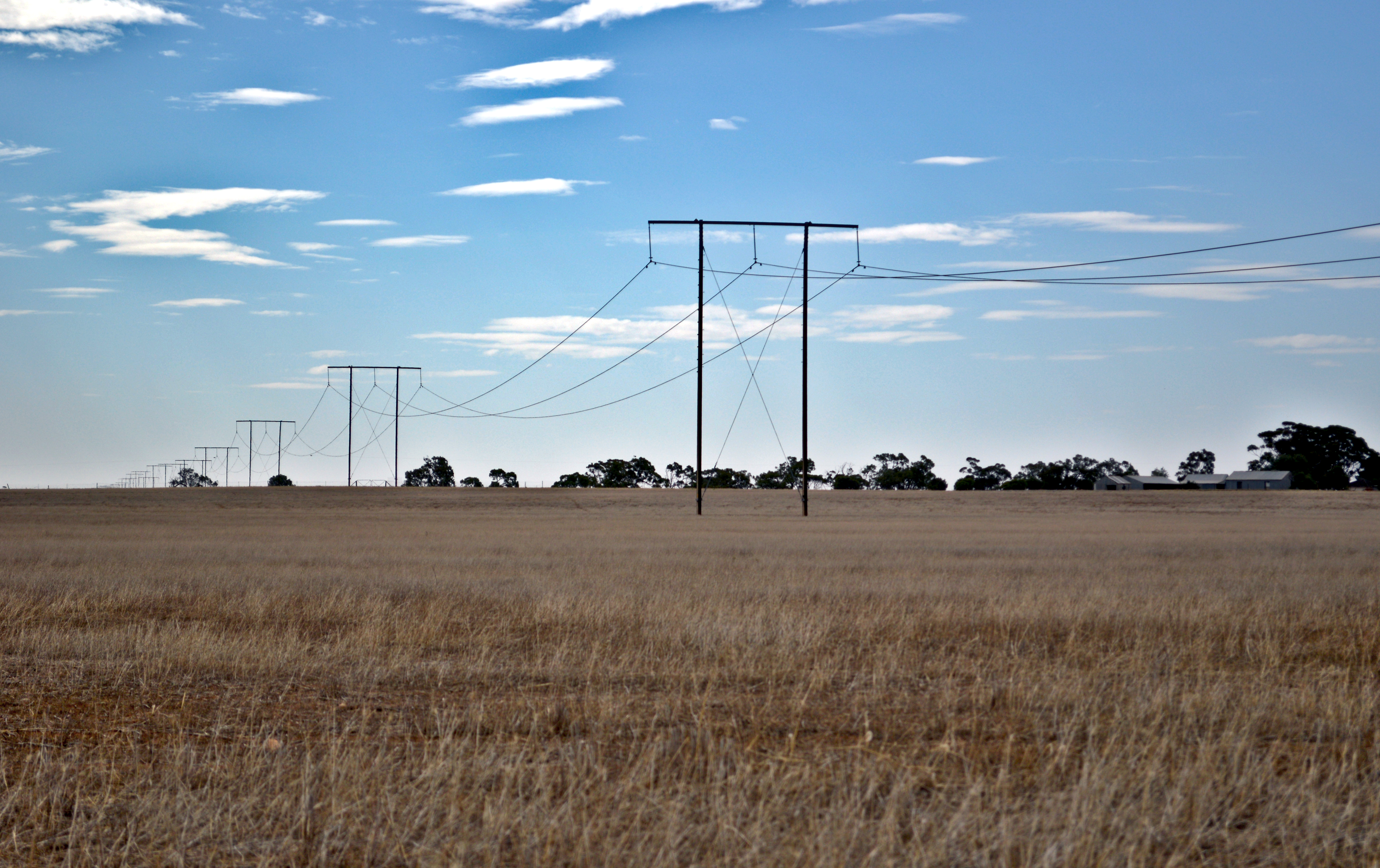
Existing overhead lines

== History ==
Alinta Energy had previously operated the coal-fired power stations in South Australia known as Northern Power Station and the older Playford A and Playford B Power Stations, all near Port Augusta. It closed the last of these power stations in 2016, and since then had not been involved in generating electricity in South Australia. Both Alinta and the state government were widely criticised for closing the coal power stations when the state experienced a major blackout during a storm in September 2016.

Ten years earlier, in March 2007, Flinders Power (now owned by Alinta Energy, and was the operating subsidiary for the Port Augusta power stations) had proposed to spend A$350M to build a 450MW gas-fired power station at Redbanks only one kilometre further north than the Reeves Plains proposal. However the Redbanks power station was never built.

The development application for Reeves Plains was submitted on 12 October 2017 and opened for public comment on 8 November the same year. It received approval from John Rau, the Minister for Planning on 16 February 2018, the last day the government could make major decisions before the state election. Alinta had not yet completed its internal investment case and received approval from its board to proceed to construction.

In September 2018, Alinta chief executive Jeff Dimery said that it had failed to get enough support from customers to reduce the investment risk of building the power station. The project was one of 12 projects shortlisted in March 2019 from 66 registrations of interest in the Australian Government's Underwriting New Generation Investments program.
