= Reeves Plains, South Australia =

Reeves Plains South Australia
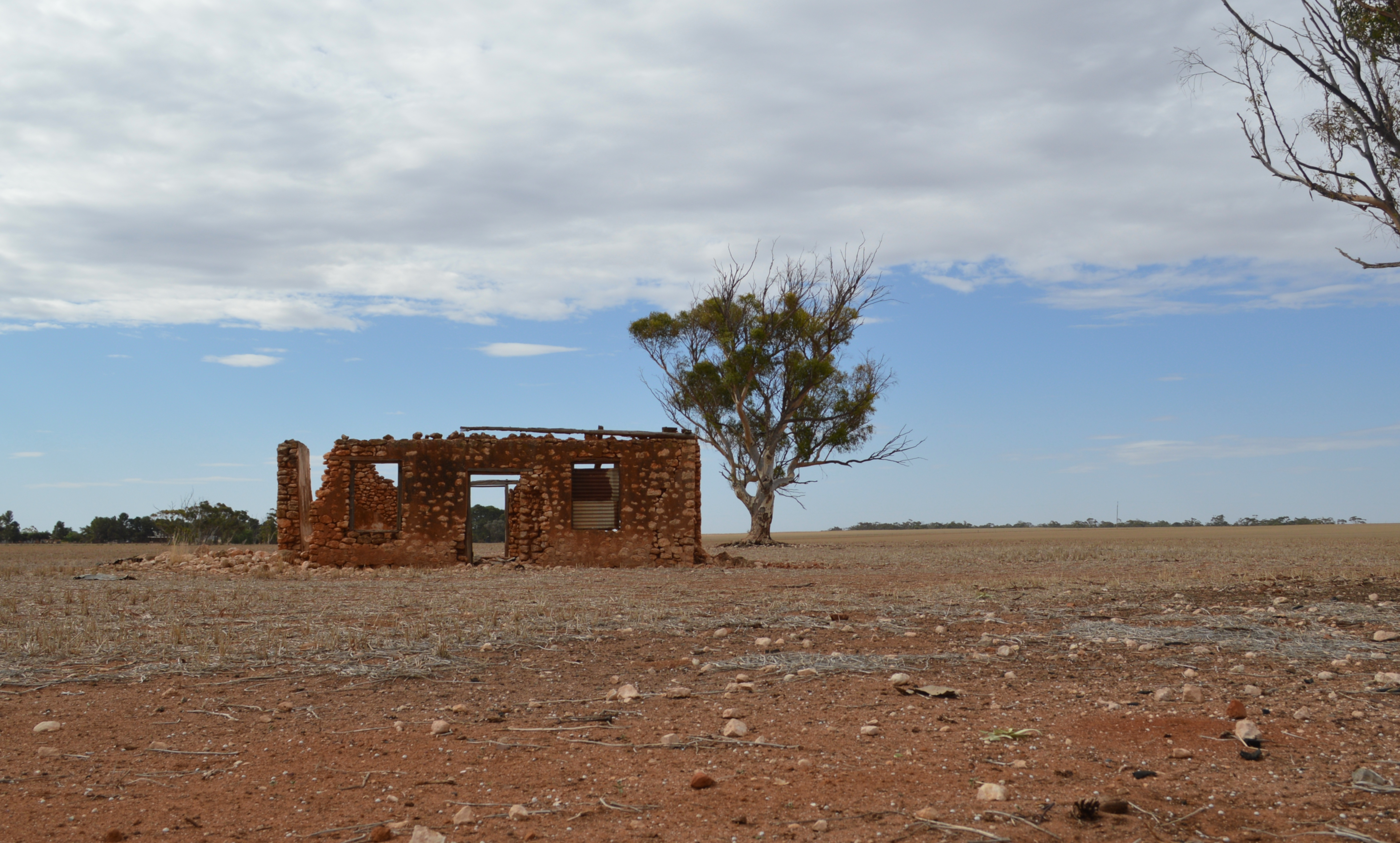

- Coordinates: 34.526°S 138.595°E
- Population: 129 (SAL 2021)
- Postcode(s): 5502
- Location: 14 km (9 mi) NW of Gawler
- LGA(s): Adelaide Plains Council; Light Regional Council
- State electorate(s): Goyder; Light
- Federal division(s): Grey; Spence
Localities around Reeves Plains:
Redbanks	Fischer	Woolsheds, Wasleys
Korunye	Reeves Plains	Kangaroo Flat
Two Wells	Lewiston	Ward Belt, Gawler River

Reeves Plains is a settlement located on the Adelaide Plains in South Australia, situated roughly halfway between the towns of Gawler to Mallala. It has a rich history, with its development closely tied to the agricultural activities of the region.

The Reeves Plains School, a key institution in the community, was established in 1867 and operated for a century before closing its doors in 1967. The settlement also had a post office, which is no longer in operation.

Religious life in Reeves Plains centered around the Primitive Methodist church, which was built in 1873 next to the school. This church transitioned to a Methodist church in 1900, but it eventually closed in 1938. The building was demolished in 1948, and materials from it were repurposed to extend the Redbanks church hall. There was also a tennis club at Reeves Plains.

The economy of Reeves Plains is largely based on farming and grazing, consistent with the broader agricultural character of the Adelaide Plains. In recent years, there has been a proposal to construct the Reeves Plains Power Station, including the nearby Moomba-Adelaide gas pipeline and a high voltage powerline crosses the locality.
