= Two Wells, South Australia =

Town in South Australia

Two Wells
- Town
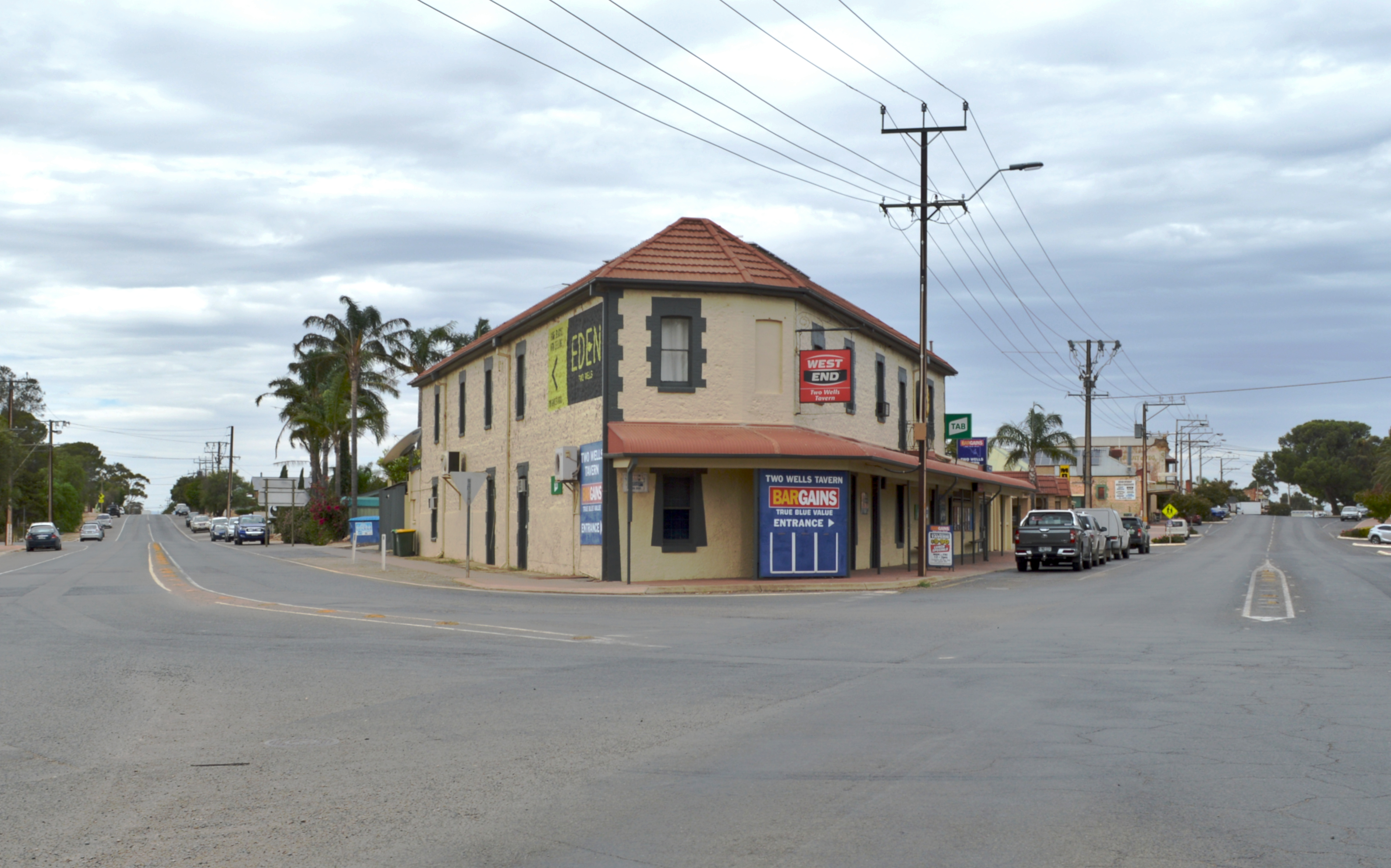

- Coordinates: 34°35′46″S 138°30′57″E
- Country: Australia
- State: South Australia
- Region: Barossa Light and Lower North
- LGA: Adelaide Plains Council
- Location: 39 km (24 mi) N of Adelaide city centre; 20 km (12 mi) S of Mallala; 24 km (15 mi) W of Gawler

Government
  - State electorate: Ngadjuri
  - Federal division: Grey
- Elevation: 9 m (30 ft)

Population
  - Total: 2,947 (UCL 2021)
- Time zone: UTC+9:30 (ACST)
  - Summer (DST): UTC+10:30 (ACST)
- Postcode: 5501
- County: Gawler
- Mean max temp: 22.7 °C (72.9 °F)
- Mean min temp: 11.2 °C (52.2 °F)
- Annual rainfall: 434.4 mm (17.10 in)
Localities around Two Wells
Lower Light	Korunye	Reeves Plains
Middle Beach	Two Wells	Lewiston
Port Gawler	Riverlea Park	Virginia

Two Wells is a town approximately 40 kilometres (25 miles) north of the Adelaide city centre in South Australia adjacent to Port Wakefield Road and passed by the Adelaide-Port Augusta railway line. The first settlers in the area used two aboriginal wells in the area as a freshwater source. At the 2016 census, Two Wells had a population of 1926.

== The two wells ==
Originally the wells were natural and permanent waterholes. In the 1880s the wells were deepened and strengthened to facilitate regular use by travelling stock. By 1900 a water pipeline supplied the area, and the wells were neglected. In the 1960s a local youth group rehabilitated the wells and surrounding area, but after a time they were again neglected. In 1979 the area was again rehabilitated, partly fenced, and signed as a reserve. It continues to be maintained by interested locals.

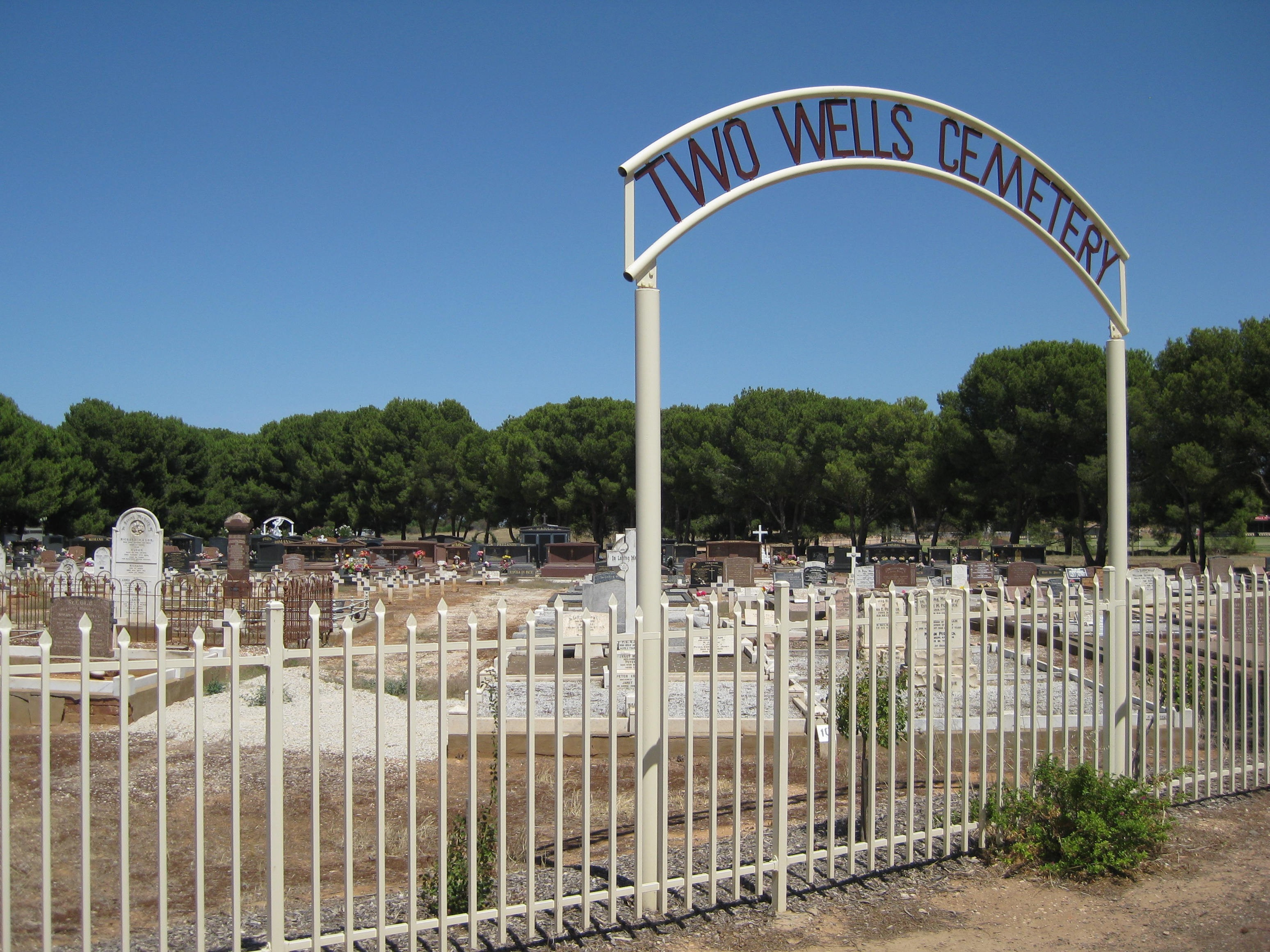
The Two Wells Cemetery

== Governance ==
The boundaries were of the town officially fixed on 21 June 1990. Two Wells is located in the federal division of Grey, the state electoral district of Taylor and the local government area of the Adelaide Plains Council.

== Media ==
The local newspaper is the Two Wells and Districts Echo, began as a newsletter in 1978, before changing to newspaper tabloid format in 2010. Servicing around 4,000 households in both Two Wells and Lewiston, between 2002 and 2010, it was known as "Your Local Echo", and prior to that as simply "Newsletter (Two Wells Community Advancement Association)". Along with a sister publication, Plains Producer, it is produced by Papers & Publications, whose main office is on Howe Street, Balaklava.

== Notable persons ==
James Park Woods who was born in Two Wells in 1886, enlisted in the Australian Imperial Forces in 1916 and was awarded a Victoria Cross for gallantry during preliminary attacks on the Hindenburg Line in September 1918. Woods survived the war and returned to a career in viticulture in Western Australia.

ABC TV host Annabell Crabb was born and went to school in Two Wells.
