= Pterostylis lepida =

Halbury greenhood

Conservation status
- Endangered (EPBC Act)

Scientific classification
- Kingdom: Plantae
- Clade: Tracheophytes
- Clade: Angiosperms
- Clade: Monocots
- Order: Asparagales
- Family: Orchidaceae
- Subfamily: Orchidoideae
- Tribe: Cranichideae
- Genus: Pterostylis
- Species: P. lepida

Binomial name
- Pterostylis lepida (D.L.Jones) G.N.Backh.

Synonyms
- Oligochaetochilus lepidus D.L.Jones

Species of orchid

Pterostylis lepida, commonly known as the Halbury greenhood is a plant in the orchid family Orchidaceae and is endemic to South Australia. Both flowering and non-flowering plants have a rosette of leaves. Flowering plants have up to ten green flowers with brown and translucent striations and a small, insect-like labellum. It is only known from two small populations.

== Description ==
Pterostylis lepida is a terrestrial, perennial, deciduous, herb with an underground tuber and between five and ten egg-shaped leaves forming a rosette about 50 mm (2 in) in diameter. Flowering plants have a rosette at the base of the flowering stem but the leaves are usually withered by flowering time. Between three and ten green flowers with translucent white and brown striations are borne on a flowering spike 100–300 mm (4–10 in) tall, but only one or two flowers are open at a time. The dorsal sepal and petals form a hood or "galea" over the column with the dorsal sepal having a narrow tip about 10 mm (0.4 in) long. The lateral sepals turn downwards, have hairy edges and narrow tips up to 20 mm (0.8 in) long which are upturned and spread apart from each other. The labellum is fleshy, dark brown, about 4 mm (0.2 in) long and insect-like with long, silky hairs on its edges. Flowering occurs from August to November.

== Taxonomy and naming ==
The Halbury greenhood was first formally described in 2009 by David Jones and given the name Oligochaetochilus lepidus from a specimen collected near Halbury. It had previously been known as Pterostylis sp. 'Halbury'. The description was published in The Orchadian. In 2010, Gary Backhouse changed the name to Pterostylis lepida. The specific epithet (lepida) is a Latin word meaning "pleasant", "elegant" or "fine".

== Distribution and habitat ==
Pterostylis lepida grows in mallee woodland with a dense shrub layer on plains. It is found in two small populations near Halbury and Moonta.

== Conservation ==
Pterostylis lepida is listed as "endangered" under the Australian Government Environment Protection and Biodiversity Conservation Act 1999. The main threats to the species are weed invasion, especially by bearded oat and brome, grazing by rabbits and trampling.
