= Undalya, South Australia =

Undalya
- Town
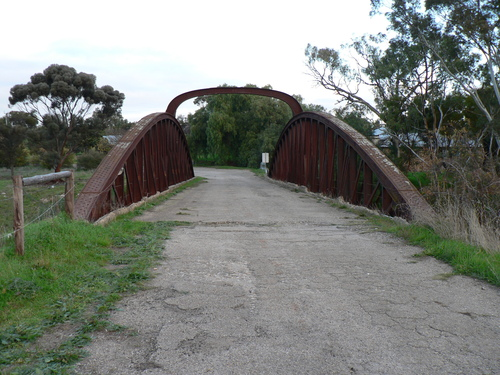
- Basket Bridge, Undalya, circa 2009

- Coordinates: 34°04′25″S 138°41′33″E
- Country: Australia
- State: South Australia
- LGA: District Council of Clare and Gilbert Valleys
- Established: 1859

Government
  - State electorate: Frome
  - Federal division: Grey

Population
  - Total: 35 (SAL 2021)
- Time zone: UTC+9:30 (ACST)
  - Summer (DST): UTC+10:30 (ACDT)
- Postcode: 5451
Localities around Undalya
Hoyleton	Auburn	Manoora
Halbury	Undalya	Saddleworth
Woolshed Flat	Rhynie	Riverton

Undalya (Postcode: 5451) is a small rural town on the southern edge of the Clare Valley, in the mid north of the state of South Australia. It is located on the Horrocks Highway approximately halfway between the towns of Auburn and Rhynie, at the junction of the River Wakefield and Pine Creek. To the east lies the town of Saddleworth and to the south-west lies the town of Balaklava. The town was officially gazetted as Undalya in 1859.

== Meaning ==
The name Undalya was given by the local Aborigines and means "water holes", while the surrounding district was known as Kercoonda meaning "camp near water". In the early years of the village, Aborigines were in great numbers in the district.

== History and events ==
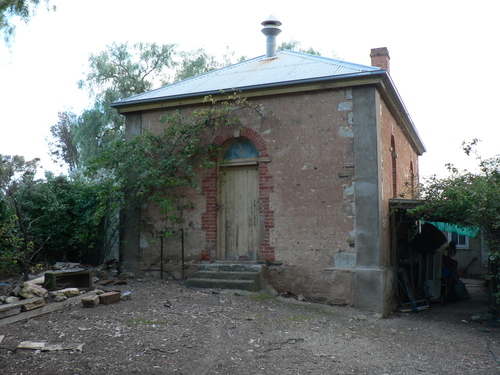
2009 photo of the Bible Christian Church and School (now a private residence).

On one of his expeditions, explorer Edward John Eyre camped at Undalya and commented on the large amount of water in the River Wakefield as well as the availability of the local blue limestone.

The most notable feature of Undalya is the local bridge over the River Wakefield. Built in 1855, with various alterations, additions and repairs, the bridge is known locally by three names: Basket Bridge, Cradle Bridge or Coathanger Bridge. It has taken the full force of many floods and at one time was the biggest one-span bridge in South Australia. The bridge was bypassed with a new bridge slightly to the east of it in the 1950s and today only serves the local residents.

In 1859, a local farmer sold one quarter of an acre for a Bible Christian Church. The Church was built in 1859 and the next year a school was commenced inside it. Both were open for nearly 100 years. Today the building is part of a private residence.

In 1866, with a grant of money and land from another local farmer, the Roman Catholic Church of St. Patrick was built by the Jesuit Fathers of Sevenhill on the hill just south of the village. The church closed in 1915 and was later demolished. A graveyard was attached to the church, and is still operating as a cemetery today. People buried there include Patrick Michael Ryan, who discovered copper at Tiparra in 1861, which was the start of the famous Moonta mine, and the first wife of the father of Auburn poet C.J. Dennis.

One of the biggest local industries during the 19th century was that of wool-scouring, or wool-washing in the River Wakefield. One such example is that of George Henry Michell, who moved his family to Undalya in 1870, after living at Cudlee Creek, where he had acquired the art of wool-scouring. He persuaded some local farmers to sell their wool directly to him. The wool was processed in the river and packed off to Adelaide and then shipped to London and auctioned. His operation was hugely successful and in 1896 he was forced to move to Hindmarsh near Adelaide. Today, Michell is a large multi-national company, run by descendants of George Henry Michell. The company's factory is located on Main North Road at Salisbury South. The Michell homestead at Undalya still stands today and is used as an animal shelter.

In the mid-to-late 19th century, ancestors of Australian Football Hall of Fame footballer Neil Kerley lived at Undalya.

In the mid-19th century to the early 20th century, according to the newspapers of the time, Undalya was a thriving rural village with reports of ploughing matches, horse racing and even a shooting at the local hotel, where the owner shot a customer who, on being refused service, had jumped the counter to serve himself.

Today the village is nothing more than a collection of a few houses around a rarely used bridge.

Notable former residents include author, illustrator and naturalist, Mervinia Masterman.

== Governance ==
Undalya is in the District Council of Clare and Gilbert Valleys, the State Electoral District of Frome, and the Australian House of Representatives Division of Grey.
