= Nicholas McCabe =

Nicholas McCabe (1850–1914) was a notable South Australian farmer and inventor.

McCabe was born in Ireland during the Great Famine, and emigrated at a young age with his parents to Adelaide, South Australia. He began farming at Pinkerton Plains, where he invented a device that became known as 'McCabe's Wheat Pickler'.

The device was a perforated container which was lowered into a large wooden cask and bagged in butts at the side of the cask. It was widely used in South Australia, and a specimen remains on display at the Mallala Museum.
