= Middle Beach, South Australia =

Middle Beach
- Town
- Looking north along the beachfront shacks

- Coordinates: 34°36′27″S 138°24′38″E
- Country: Australia
- State: South Australia
- Region: Barossa Light and Lower North
- LGA: Adelaide Plains Council
- Location: 40 km (25 mi) from Adelaide
- Established: 5 June 1997 (locality)

Government
  - State electorate: Taylor
  - Federal division: Grey

Population
  - Total: 94 (SAL 2021)
- Time zone: UTC+9:30 (ACST)
  - Summer (DST): UTC+10:30 (ACST)
- Postcode: 5501
- County: Gawler
- Mean max temp: 22.7 °C (72.9 °F)
- Mean min temp: 11.2 °C (52.2 °F)
- Annual rainfall: 431.0 mm (16.97 in)
Localities around Middle Beach
| Gulf St Vincent | Lower Light | Korunye; Two Wells |
| Gulf St Vincent | Middle Beach | Two Wells |
| Gulf St Vincent | Port Gawler | Port Gawler |

Middle Beach is a small town in South Australia located about 40 kilometres (25 miles) northwest of the Adelaide city centre in the State of Southern Australia. It is located in the Adelaide Plains Council.

As of 2021, the population of Middle Beach was 94.

== Demographics ==
The 2006 Census by the Australian Bureau of Statistics counted 366 persons on Middle Beach on census night. Of these, 55.2% were male and 44.8% were female.

The majority of residents (66.1%) are of Australian birth, with other common census responses being England (4.6%) and Netherlands (3.0%).

The age distribution of Middle Beach residents is comparable to that of the greater Australian population. 68.8% of residents were over 25 years in 2006, compared to the Australian average of 66.5%; and 31.2% were younger than 25 years, compared to the Australian average of 33.5%.

== Community ==
The local newspaper is the Plains Producer.

== Attractions ==
Middle Beach is notable for its samphire swamplands and fishing in the mangroves. A boat ramp and small creek are located at the southern end of the shellgrit beach.

== Transport ==
Middle Beach is located beside Port Wakefield Road.

== Discovery of Peter Stogneff's remains ==
In August 1981, 14 year old Peter Stogneff took a day off school to meet a cousin in Rundle Mall, but the plans were cancelled. After being reported missing by his parents, his skeletal remains were discovered in June 1982 after a local farmer lit a fire to clear land near Middle Beach. The coroner noted that Peter's body had been sawn through in at least three places. His murder is one of the five cases known as The Family Murders.
