= Korunye, South Australia =

Korunye
- Town
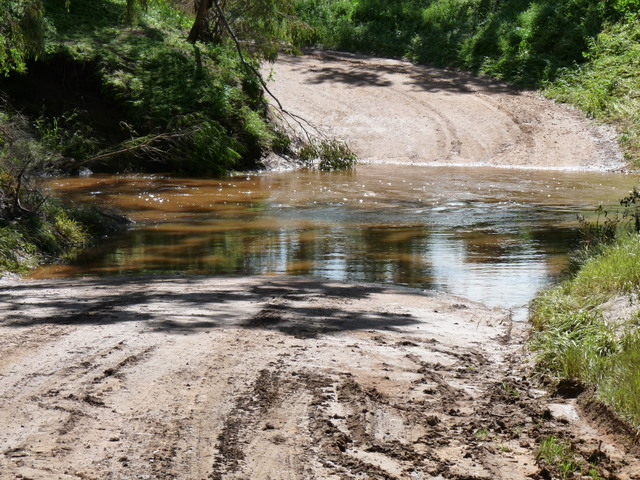
- Ford through the River Light on Wasley Road, Korunye

- Coordinates: 34.512380°S 138.510220°E
- Country: Australia
- State: South Australia
- Region: Light
- LGA: Adelaide Plains Council

Government
  - State electorate: Goyder
  - Federal division: Grey

Population
  - Total: 224 (SAL 2021)
- Postcode: 5502
- County: Gawler
Localities around Korunye
Mallala	Mallala	Redbanks
Lower Light	Korunye	Reeves Plains
Middle Beach	Two Wells	Lewiston

Korunye (pronounced /kəˈrʌni/) is a locality in South Australia beside the Adelaide-Crystal Brook rail line between Two Wells and Mallala. The name derived is from that of the historic railway siding, Korunye Railway Station, within the locality. South Australian historian Geoffrey Manning states that Korunye is from an indigenous word meaning "rainbow".
