= Michell Group of Companies =

Australian wool processing and broking company

G. H. Michell and Sons was an Australian wool processing and broking company based in Hindmarsh, South Australia, relocated to Salisbury, South Australia and with a change in company structure in the 1980s became Michell Australia Pty Ltd then the Michell Group of Companies.

== G. H. Michell & Sons ==
George Henry Michell founded the company G. H. Michell & Sons of wool brokers and processors at Undalya, South Australia around 1895, then in July 1903 purchased the wool-scouring works at 33 Adam Street, Hindmarsh, previously run by W. Peacock and Sons, and transferred all its activities there; all four sons were employed in the business.

On 25 December 1907 his premises were destroyed in one of South Australia's largest fires, which commenced at W. H. Burford & Son's "Apollo Works" soap factory, and also destroyed George Wilcox's skin depot and a number of houses. David Reid's tannery was spared. Another major fire, in 1943, at fellmonger David Jowitt and Sons, spared both Michell's and Burford's factories, but on 24 April 1945, yet another fire destroyed their wool treatment factory at the corner of Mandon and Adam Streets.

In 1938 the company was listed on the Melbourne Stock Exchange with a signed-up capital of £500,000 in £1 shares. (and doubled to £lm. in 1953) The wool business thrived during wartime, and major expansion was carried out on Adam Street, but expansion onto South Road (then known as Taylor's Road) was opposed by nearby residents, no doubt on account of the smell which accompanies wool processing. In 1947 a new private company, G. H. Michell & Sons (SA) Ltd., was formed with a nominal capital of £100,000 and two shareholders: R. J. and G. H. Michell.

In 1947 a new company "Woolcombers (WA) Pty. Ltd." was formed in Perth, Western Australia with a nominal capital of £300,000. A factory was opened in Fremantle Ronald James Michell, William Edward Michell, George Edward Michell, Colin Edgar Michell and Gwendolyn Elva Hastings were the first directors.

=== George Henry Michell ===
George Henry Michell (ca.1832 – 2 February 1918) came to South Australia from Hayle, Cornwall, with his wife Catherine (ca.1840 – 11 September 1919) and her widowed mother Catherine Donnithorne (ca.1816 – 16 July 1898), by the iron sailing vessel "Trevelyan", reaching Adelaide on 21 March 1866. After a short time following his trade of bootmaker, he tried farming at Cudlee Creek then in 1870 moved to Undalya (in some references "Mundalya"), where he made a start in the wool business by buying small lots from the farmers in the district, and scouring on the banks of the River Wakefield.

He was noted for buying wool during slumps in trade; sometimes he was the only serious buyer at auctions.

He retired in 1909, leaving the business to three of his sons.

Apart from his business and his associations with the Hindmarsh Congregational Church, he took no prominent part in public affairs. His home was at "Stoneleigh", 29 John St, Hindmarsh.

=== George Henry Michell II, James Alfred Michell and Edgar Michell ===
Took over the business from their father in 1909.

Brothers George Henry II, James Alfred and Edgar Michell with John White Mellor and Stanley Charles Mellor founded Commonwealth Agricultural Service Engineers (C.A.S.E.) and National Guarantee Corporation which failed in 1925. This company was found to have been set up fraudulently.

Founded Hindmarsh Engineering Co. Ltd. with engineers Samuel Ward and John Albert Wesley in 1925 with offices in Adam Street, Hindmarsh.

=== Ronald James Michell ===
He was appointed to the Chamber of Manufactures in 1937 and M.D. of G. H. Michell and Sons in 1943. He started trade with China in 1949.

=== George Howard Michell AC ===
Howard Michell was awarded AC in 1990 for services to the wool industry and the arts.

=== Raymond Michell AM ===
James Raymond Michell AM was appointed to the board in 1950, elected Chairman 1992 – 2002.

=== John Alfred Michell AM ===
Educated at Prince Alfred College, with G H Michell and Sons from 1949, was General Manager of the Michell Group of Companies 1978–2000 and prominent in a number of national and international bodies.

=== Peter Michell and David Michell ===
In 2004 Chairman David and MD Peter Michell set up a US$10 million scouring and carbonising plant at Suzhou in Jiangsu Province, China.

== Family ==
George Henry Michell (c. 1832 – 2 February 1918) married Catherine Donnithorne (c. 1840 – 11 September 1919) in October 1865. Their six children were:

- William Edward (c. 1866 – 22 January 1905) married Jessie Ada Mathews (c. 1876 – 26 May 1918) on 15 May 1895, lived at McDonnell Avenue, New Hindmarsh
- George Henry Michell II. ( – 31 December 1938) married Ann Jane ("Annie") ( – c. 13 November 1948). Their home was "Woollahra" at Parker Street, Mile End, then Fitzroy Terrace, Thorngate

- G(eorge) Howard Michell AC (3 August 1913 – 26 June 2012) married (Valerie) Christine Tipping on 3 December 1938. Their home was at Avenel Gardens Road, then Briar Avenue, both in Medindie
- Gwendolyn Elva ("Gwen") (26 January 1917 – ) married John Batton Hastings. They divorced in December 1944. She was a major benefactor of the University of Adelaide.

- Edgar (1873 – 29 December 1936) married Lottie Richards (c. 1879 – 7 March 1966), living at Undalya, then Lurline St, Kent Town, then "Undalya", The Esplanade, Henley Beach South and finally Fitzroy Terrace, Fitzroy.

- Kenneth Renfred (28 August 1898 – c. 1952) married Doreen Reid on 18 June 1924; their home was in Labrina Ave., Prospect, then "Kentleigh", Northcote Terrace, Medindie

- Helen married Alan Morris on 24 November 1949, living at "Dunluce", Crafers then Dulwich Avenue, Dulwich.

- Colin Edgar (23 February 1915 – 1960) was educated at King's College, Kensington Park (and president of its Old Scholars), served in the RAAF, was a racehorse owner, married Kathleen Mary "Kay" Harland on 7 June 1939, home 4 Briar Ave Medindie, then Kensington Park.

- James Alfred ( – c. 22 February 1937) married Ethel Beatrice Shearing ( – c. 14 November 1936) on 15 July 1903; they lived at "Highbury", Hughes Street, Mile End, South Australia then Churcher Street, Thorngate

- Ronald James "Ron" (8 December 1904 – ) married Rene Walsh, living at Alpha Road, Prospect.

- John Alfred (1932 – ) married Patricia Mary "Pat" Catcheside on 20 October 1956. Pat was an illustrator for Charles Mountford from 1955 to 1956.

- Marie Ethel (9 April 1913 – )
- William Edward "Will" (1906– ) married Beatrice E. Eaton on 14 May 1930 lived Martin Ave, Fitzroy. He was a director and major shareholder in Pope Products, Ltd.

- Mary Ann ( – 28 May 1923) married John Edward Isaacson on 22 November 1893, lived at "Kennedya", Undalya and "Stoneleigh", East Parade, Kensington Park

- William Edward (c. 1896 – 12 October 1917) fought in World War I and was killed at Passchendaele
- Clarice Eveline married architect Stanley Alfred Seaton (originally Schramm) on 5 July 1919, lived in Mosman, New South Wales
- Nellie married George Walkem on 7 April 1924
- son 6 April 1908
- youngest son Lawrence E. married Norah E. Croft on

- Gordon D(onnithorne) Michell (c. 1884 – 28 October 1908)

=== Others ===
There is another Michell family for which there is evidence of a familial relationship (i.e. several members buried with G. H. Michell's family at Hindmarsh):

- Joseph Michell (c. 1844 – 20 June 1886) married Priscilla (c. 1850 – 6 November 1934) Joseph was a builder then market gardener who was killed in a horse carriage accident. They lived at 140 Gibson Street, Bowden, later Unley Park. Their children were

- Gertrude
- Bessie
- Beatrice
- Lorenzo T. (c. 1883 – 17 February 1958) married Rose A. (c. 1883 – 25 April 1955)

- Lorenzo Joseph "Laurie" (c. 1903 – 23 October 1981) married Linda Maud (c. 1908 – 4 March 1976)

- Victor in Western Australia
- Leslie in Western Australia
- Percy Clive (youngest son) married Lilian May Green on 13 July 1911

- William Sampson Michell, brother of Joseph
