= Mervinia Masterman =

Australian author, naturalist, and illustrator (b. 1901, d. 1998)

Edith Mervinia Masterman (1901–1998) was an Australian writer, naturalist and illustrator, best known for her two illustrated books dedicated to the natural history of Kangaroo Island: Flinder's Chase, Kangaroo Island, South Australia: Place of enchantment for nature lovers (1950) and Flinder's Chase Revisited, Kangaroo Island, South Australia: Nature-lovers' sanctuary (1972).

Masterman also gave public lectures on the subject. The Advertiser described her original 1950 work as "a charming book" and columnist Eleanor Barbour described her as "an artist of no mean calibre" with a talent for "fluent descriptive writing". The book was advertised and distributed nationally.

== Political views ==
Masterman lobbied to maintain the boundaries and protections of Flinder's Chase National Park and was an advocate for nature education.

== Personal life ==
Masterman lived at Undalya with her husband John, an apiarist. They had a daughter on 11 May 1936, and another on 9 February 1940. She played an active role in the Associated Country Women of the World, gave talks on art to various Country Women's Association branches and held informal art classes and sketching parties. She died the same year as her husband.
