= Barabba, South Australia =

Barabba
- Town
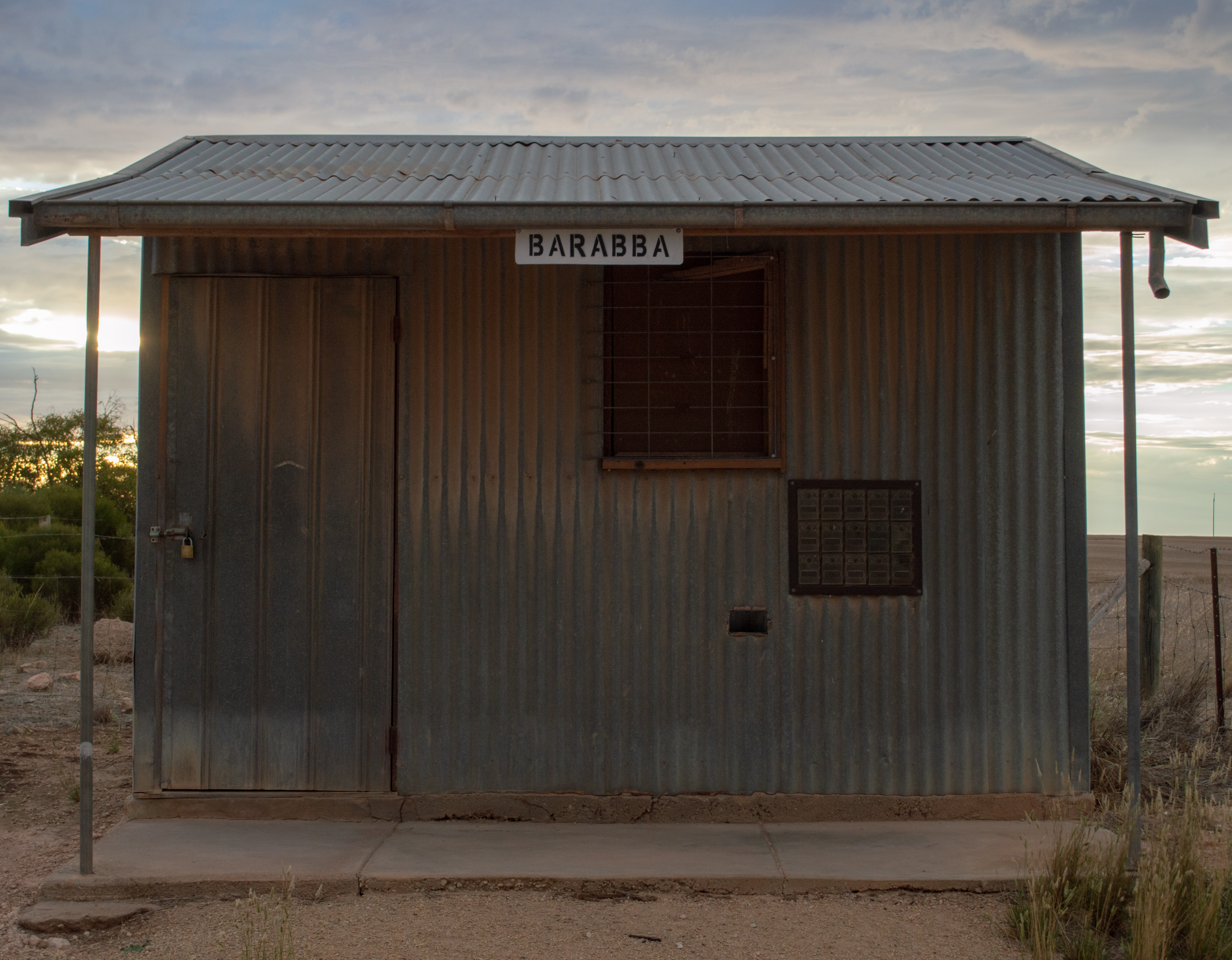
- Former post office

- Coordinates: 34.34°S 138.59°E
- Country: Australia
- State: South Australia
- LGAs: Wakefield Regional Council; Adelaide Plains Council

Government
  - State electorates: Frome; Narungga
  - Federal division: Grey

Population
  - Total: 135 (SAL 2021)
- Postcode: 5460
Localities around Barabba
Pinery	Owen	Stockyard Creek
Grace Plains	Barabba	Hamley Bridge
Mallala	Redbanks	Pinkerton Plains

Barabba is a locality in the Mid North region of South Australia, between Mallala and Hamley Bridge on the north bank of the Light River.

Barabba includes the former government town of Aliceburgh which was proclaimed in 1879 and named for Governor William Jervois' daughter Alice.

The name Barabba is derived from an Aboriginal word for an indigenous bulrush plant. The town of Aliceburgh ceased to exist in 1897 and was resurveyed into larger workingmen's blocks. A Primitive Methodist Church opened in 1877. The Barabba post office operated from 1877 until 1971. It operated from the school building until 1926. The school itself closed in 1960 and the building was destroyed by the 2015 Pinery bushfire. The final service in the church was held in 1967 and it has since been demolished.
