= Salter Springs, South Australia =

Salter Springs South Australia
- Coordinates: 34.18°S 138.63°E
- Population: 59 (SAL 2021)
- Postcode(s): 5401
- Time zone: ACST (UTC+9:30)
  - Summer (DST): ACDT (UTC+10:30)
- LGA(s): Clare and Gilbert Valleys Council
- State electorate(s): Frome
- Federal division(s): Grey
Localities around Salter Springs:
Halbury	Woolshed Flat	Rhynie
	Salter Springs	Riverton
Owen	Alma	Giles Corner

Salter Springs, previously "Salter's Springs", is a small town situated west of Riverton and south of Woolshed Flat.

It was named for William Salter, who arrived in South Australia on Caroline in 1839, and had a sheep station in the area. The town was surveyed in 1858. The school opened in 1867 and closed in 1956.
