= Woolsheds, South Australia =

Woolsheds
- Town
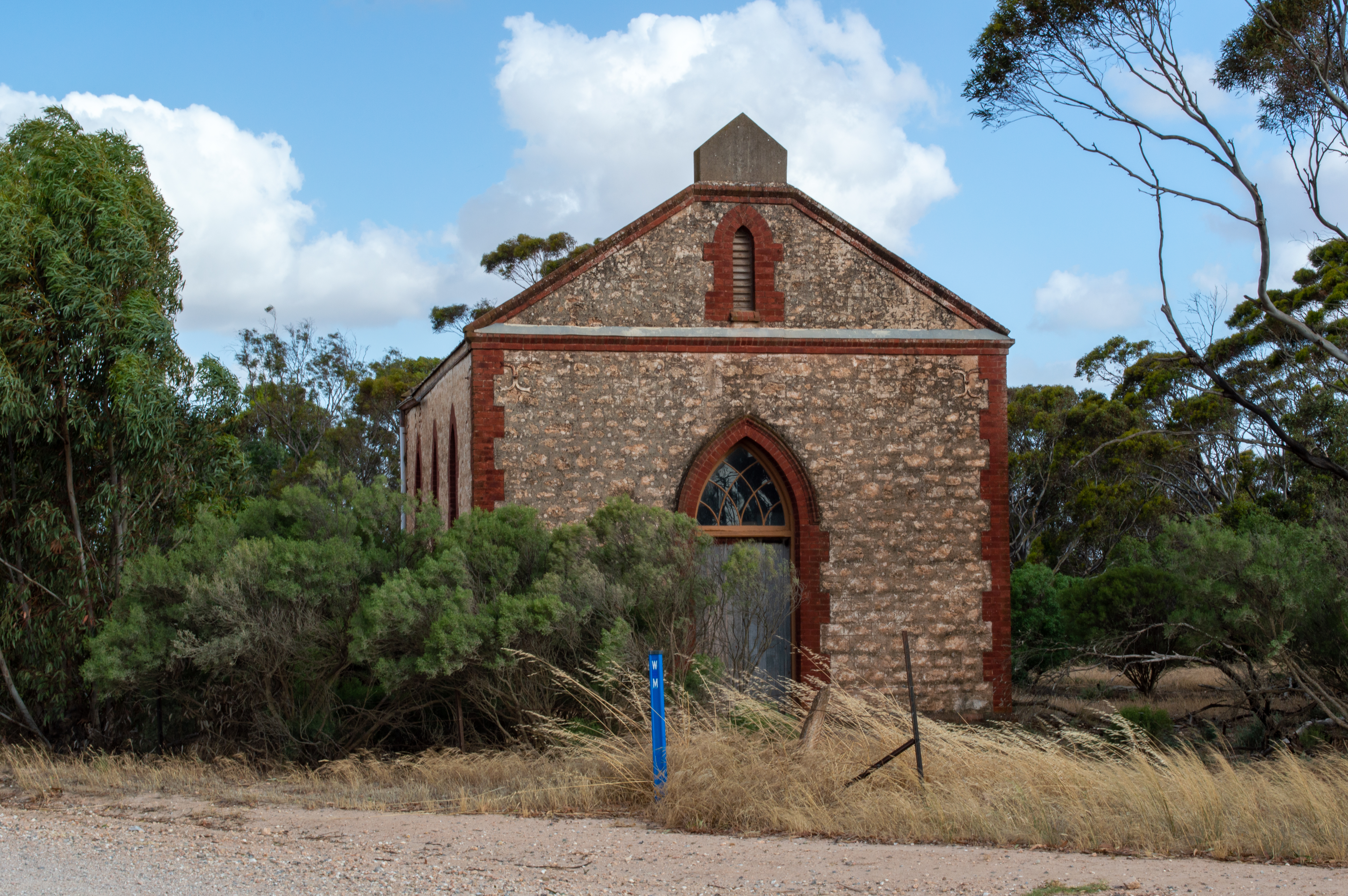
- Former Woolsheds Methodist Church

- Coordinates: 34.48°S 138.64°E
- Country: Australia
- State: South Australia
- LGA: Light Regional Council
- Location: 18 km (11 mi) northwest of Gawler

Government
  - State electorate: Schubert
  - Federal division: Grey

Population
  - Total: 27 (SAL 2021)
- Postcode: 5400
Localities around Woolsheds
Pinkerton Plains
Redbanks	Woolsheds	Wasleys
Fischer	Reeves Plains

Woolsheds is a locality in the lower Mid North of South Australia north of the road between Gawler and Mallala.

The Country Fire Service shed at Woolsheds is signed as Woolsheds-Wasleys. It is across the road from the former Woolsheds Methodist Church.

The church was originally in the Gawler then Gawler West Methodist circuits and later in the Hamley Bridge then Adelaide Plains Methodist circuits, but has been closed for many years. The church was built in 1875 as a Bible Christian chapel. It became Methodist on church union in 1901. The church (and hence the locality) received the name "woolsheds" due to it being near to the woolshed on a neighbouring property.
