= William Pinkerton =

South Australian settler from England

William Pinkerton (1810–1893) was an early English settler in South Australia. He became a major rancher and landowner. He was known for violent retaliation in 1848 against a band of Nauo Aboriginals on his land who had killed one of his shepherds. It was known as the Waterloo Bay Massacre.

== History ==
Pinkerton arrived in Adelaide, South Australia in 1838. By 1840, he had a considerable land holding called 'Studley' on the River Torrens, on which he was grazing sheep, cattle, horses and pigs. In 1843, Pinkerton took up land near Quorn. He also had land in the Light district, and on the Eyre Peninsula around Mount Wedge and Lake Newland. A number of places in South Australia bear Pinkerton's name - Pinkerton Plains and Pinkerton Flat in the Light district, and Pinkerton Creek near Quorn.

Relations with the Aboriginal people, who had occupied the territory for 10,000 years, were strained. Pinkerton had often violent encounters with the local Aboriginal people. In 1848, a battle broke out on Pinkerton's Eyre Peninsula station with the local Aboriginal people, who were most likely Nauo. One shepherd on Pinkerton's station was killed with a waddy. A mythic account said that his head was cut off and baked in a camp oven.

This murder is said by many to have provoked what became one of the most notorious and debated acts of frontier violence, the Waterloo Bay Massacre. Another shepherd on the same station was attacked by Aboriginal people. He fired a shotgun in retaliation, wounding one Aboriginal person. Later that year, Pinkerton's overseer killed an Aboriginal man on the station. This was part of a wider battle being waged throughout the west coast of the Eyre Peninsula at this time.

It appears that later in life, Pinkerton left Australia. He died in 1893 in Arizona in the United States.
