= Lower Light, South Australia =

Lower Light
- Town
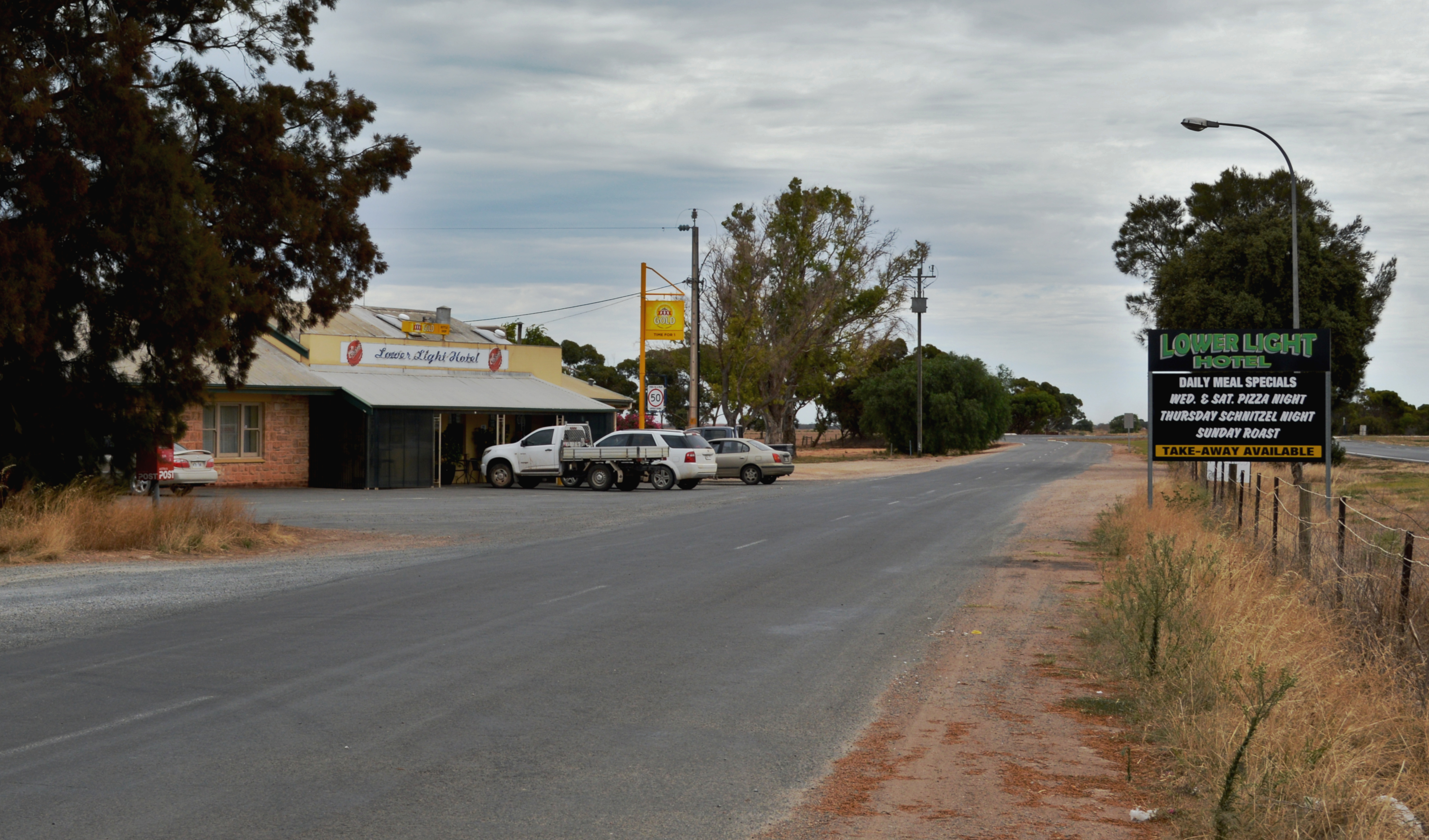
- Lower Light Hotel

- Coordinates: 34°31′57″S 138°26′13″E
- Country: Australia
- State: South Australia
- LGA: Adelaide Plains Council
- Location: 46 km (29 mi) N of Adelaide

Government
  - State electorate: Narungga >
  - Federal division: Grey

Population
  - Total: 203 (SAL 2021)
- Postcode: 5501
Localities around Lower Light
Thompson Beach	Dublin	Mallala
Gulf St Vincent	Lower Light	Korunye
Gulf St Vincent	Middle Beach	Two Wells

Lower Light is a township adjacent to Port Wakefield Road in South Australia's lower Mid North. The township of Port Prime was surveyed on the coast of Gulf St Vincent in 1880, but little remains of that town now, and it is included as part of the bounded locality of Lower Light.

Lower Light is named for the lower Light River estuary into Gulf St Vincent directly south of the settlement.

Lower Light has also been the location of parachuting/skydiving operations since 1962, which operate from the George Quigley Airfield, located a short distance north of the township.

== See also ==
- Adelaide International Bird Sanctuary National Park—Winaityinaityi Pangkara
