= Lewiston, South Australia =

Lewiston South Australia
- Coordinates: 34°36′16″S 138°35′29″E
- Population: 2,174 (UCL 2021)
- Postcode(s): 5501
- Location: 6 km (4 mi) E of Two Wells; 5 km (3 mi) NW of Angle Vale; 12 km (7 mi) from Gawler; 44 km (27 mi) W of Adelaide
- LGA(s): Adelaide Plains Council
- State electorate(s): Taylor
- Federal division(s): Grey
Localities around Lewiston:
Korunye	Reeves Plains	Ward Belt
Two Wells	Lewiston	Gawler River
Virginia	Penfield Gardens	Angle Vale

Lewiston is a semi-rural locality in South Australia, 6 km east of Two Wells, 12 km west of Gawler and 56 km from the Adelaide city centre. At the 2011 census, Lewiston had a population of 2,947.

Lewiston is an animal and crop farming area.

Lewiston was named by local residents in December 1864, in honour of James William Lewis, Post Master General of South Australia from 1861 until 1869. Lewis had approved a branch Post Office for the Lewiston district, which was to operate from the school house.

The name Lewiston was first used when the branch Post Office opened on 1 February 1865. The first Post Mistress was Isabella Mitchell, wife of the school master William Mitchell.

The school opened in January 1857 and was known as the Port Gawler East school. In 1866 the name of the school was changed to Lewiston. The school closed in 1944 and was demolished.

== Notes and sources ==
=== Sources ===
- Porter, Anne (2015). The Needle in a Haystack – A History of Lewiston.
