= Pinkerton Plains, South Australia =

Pinkerton Plains South Australia
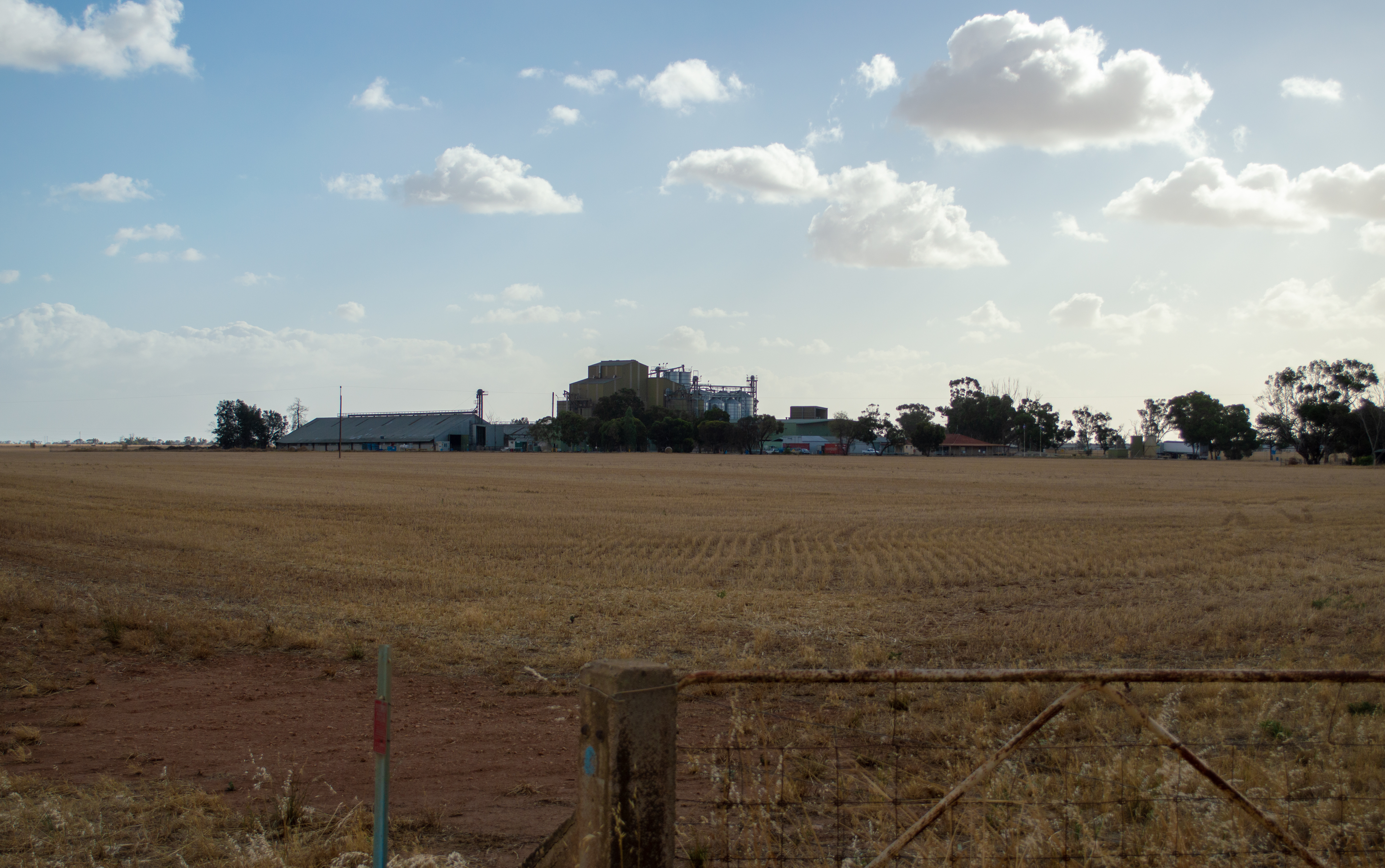
- Ridley Mill in Pinkerton Plains

- Coordinates: 34°25′50″S 138°37′00″E
- Population: 76 (2016 census)
- Established: 18 May 1995 (locality)
- Postcode(s): 5400
- Time zone: ACST (UTC+9:30)
  - Summer (DST): ACST (UTC+10:30)
- Location: 9 km (6 mi) east of Mallala; 25 km (16 mi) NW of Gawler
- LGA(s): Light Regional Council
- Region: Barossa Light and Lower North
- County: Gawler
- State electorate(s): Light
- Federal division(s): Grey
Mean max temp	Mean min temp	Annual rainfall
23.7 °C; 75 °F	9.7 °C; 49 °F	388.0 mm 15.3 in
Suburbs around Pinkerton Plains:
Barabba	Barabba; Hamley Bridge	Hamley Bridge
Barabba; Mallala; Redbanks	Pinkerton Plains	Magdala; Wasleys
Redbanks	Woolsheds	Wasleys
- Footnotes: Adjoining localities

Pinkerton Plains is a locality in the Mid North of South Australia, Australia.

The locality is named for William Pinkerton, an early pastoralist active in the region in the 1840s. The land was originally the land of the Kaurna people. It is unclear when the area first became known as 'Pinkerton Plains', but references to Pinkerton Plains begin to appear in newspaper reports and South Australian Government documents from about 1866, which is about when the area was first settled. The area was settled by a number of Irish Catholic settlers, and in 1866, the St Benedict's Catholic Church was established there. The Church closed in 1900, but its cemetery remains in use by farmers in the area.

In about 1868, a railway station was erected at Pinkerton Plains on the railway that ran through the locality.

Pinkerton Plains School was established in 1886 and remained open until 1967.

Pinkerton Plains' most famous resident was probably Nicholas McCabe, a notable farmer who invented 'McCabe's Wheat Pickler', a pickling device that was used by farmers across South Australia for a period of time.
