= Plains Producer =

The Plains Producer is a weekly newspaper published Wednesdays by Papers and Publications Pty. Ltd. in Balaklava, South Australia. It was founded in 1903 and was printed until 1941, when it was stopped by the Second World War. The publication was revived in 1946 and it has been published continuously since then.

== History ==
The newspaper, founded by James Walker, was first known as Central Advocate, which started on 25 September 1903 and continued until 10 September 1909 (Issue 305). when it was renamed Wooroora Producer (subtitled: "incorporating the Central Advocate and The Hamley Bridge Express"), to reflect its link to the former Electoral district of Wooroora (1875-1938). It was purchased in 1910 by W. Hancock who went into partnership with S.W. Osborne (who became sole proprietor in 1923), then by Amy Henstridge in July 1926 (who had previously owned the Snowtown paper The Stanley Herald). In 1926, the newspaper shifted from a broadsheet to a tabloid format and from September 1932, the Henstridge family assumed ownership.

The Wooroora Producer was printed until 27 June 1940 (Issue 1676), when the publication was renamed on 4 July to The Producer (subtitled: "with which is incorporated "The Central Advocate" and "Hamley Bridge Express""). However, due to wartime restrictions and rationing, publication ceased for five years, from 19 June 1941 (Issue 1726) until resuming as a "Post-War Series" on 4 July 1946 (Vol. 40. No. 1). In 1975, it moved from private ownership when it was bought by Papers and Publications, and in an effort to overhaul the newspaper, it was renamed to Plains Producer in 1983.

== Distribution ==
According to the website, the media workshop (TMW), the newspaper currently "enjoys a 90% penetration rate in Balaklava and surrounding areas", meaning a readership of around 7,000 people in the towns of: Snowtown, Blyth, Brinkworth, Clare, Watervale, Manoora, Port Wakefield, Balaklava, Auburn, Saddleworth, Riverton, Owen, Hamley Bridge, Tarlee, Kapunda, Dublin, Windsor, Lower Light, Mallala, Two Wells, Gawler, Wasleys, and Virginia. As of 2018, the newspapers weekly print run is around 3,500, representing a readership of around 10,000 people.

== Awards ==
The newspaper won the BankSA Best Newspaper award (with a circulation under 5,000) in 1996, 1998, 1999, 2000, and 2008. It also won the Country Press SA Inc. award for best newspaper (under 3000 circulation) in 1996, 1998, 1999, 2000, 2001, 2008 and 2009.

== Digitisation ==
Australian National Library carries images and text versions of the newspaper from 1903 to 1941, and 1946 to 1950, accessible using Trove, the on-line newspaper retrieval service.
