= Woolshed Flat, Victoria =

Woolshed Flat
- Town
- Coordinates: 36°19′38″S 143°39′33″E
- Country: Australia
- State: Victoria
- LGA: Shire of Loddon

Government
  - State electorate: Ripon
  - Federal division: Mallee

Population
  - Total: 13 (2021 census)
- Postcode: 3518

Woolshed Flat is a locality in the Shire of Loddon, Victoria, Australia. At the 2021 census, Woolshed Flat had a population of 13.
