= Redbanks, South Australia =

Redbanks South Australia
- Coordinates: 34.482°S 138.562°E
- Population: 185 (SAL 2021)
- Postcode(s): 5502
- Location: 67 km (42 mi) N of Adelaide; 23 km (14 mi) NW of Gawler; 7 km (4 mi) SE of Mallala
- LGA(s): Adelaide Plains Council
- State electorate(s): Goyder
- Federal division(s): Grey
Localities around Redbanks:
Mallala	Barabba, Pinkerton Plains	Pinkerton Plains
Mallala, Korunye	Redbanks	Woolsheds, Fischer
Korunye	Reeves Plains	Reeves Plains

Redbanks is a town and locality in South Australia's lower Mid North. The boundaries were formally established in June 1997 for "the long established name".

Redbanks is located on the Gawler to Mallala road (Redbanks Road), east of the bridge over the Light River. Redbanks Post Office opened in November 1868 and closed in March 1971. Redbanks Wesleyan Methodist church was built in 1867. It closed early in the 20th century, but reopened before being replaced by a new Methodist church closer to the town in 1934. The older building was demolished around 1950, and the stone was used in the new church hall. The new Methodist Church opened on 29 July 1934. It closed in August 1964.

== See also ==
- List of cities and towns in South Australia
