= Woolshed Flat, South Australia =

Location in Clare Valley

Woolshed Flat
- Suburb
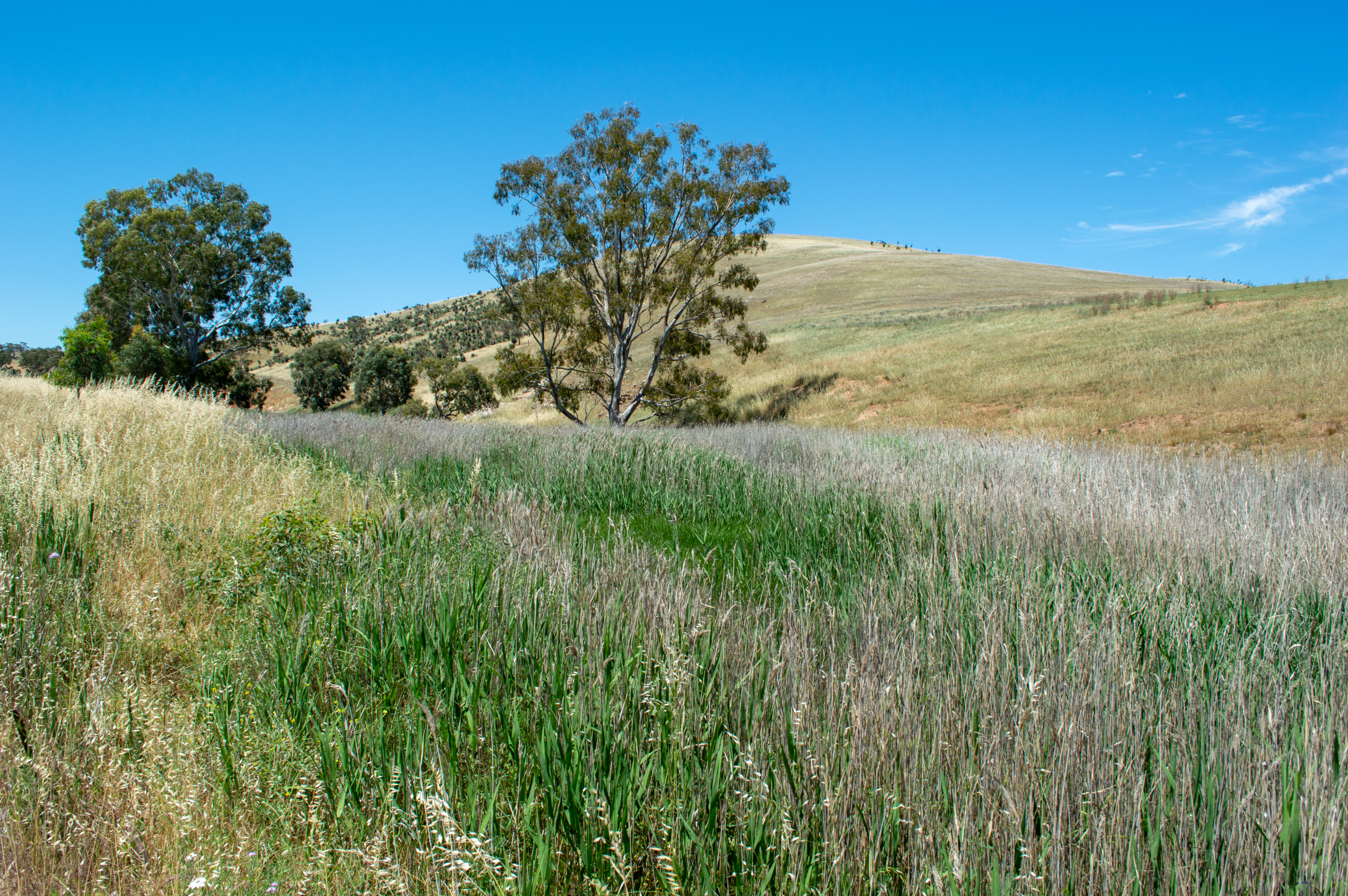
- Woolshed Flat Creek

- Coordinates: 34°07′22″S 138°38′30″E
- Country: Australia
- State: South Australia
- Region: Yorke and Mid North
- LGA: District Council of Clare and Gilbert Valleys
- Location: 92 km (57 mi) N of Adelaide city centre

Government
  - State electorate: Frome (2012)
  - Federal division: Grey

Population
  - Total: 30 (SAL 2016)
- Time zone: UTC+9:30 (ACST)
  - Summer (DST): UTC+10:30 (ACST)
- Postcode: 5412
- County: Gawler
Suburbs around Woolshed Flat
Auburn	Auburn; Undalya	Undalya
Auburn; Halbury	Woolshed Flat	Undalya; Rhynie
Halbury; Salter Springs	Salter Springs	Rhynie

Woolshed Flat is a locality near the southern end of the Clare Valley in South Australia. It is located in the District Council of Clare and Gilbert Valleys.

== Geography ==
Woolshed Flat lies in the Mid North of the state, situated north-west of Rhynie, west of Main North Road.

== Community ==
There is no longer a school in the locality. The nearest are at Riverton. There was also a Methodist church established in 1859 as a Wesleyan church, which is still standing, surrounded by its cemetery, but no longer used for worship.

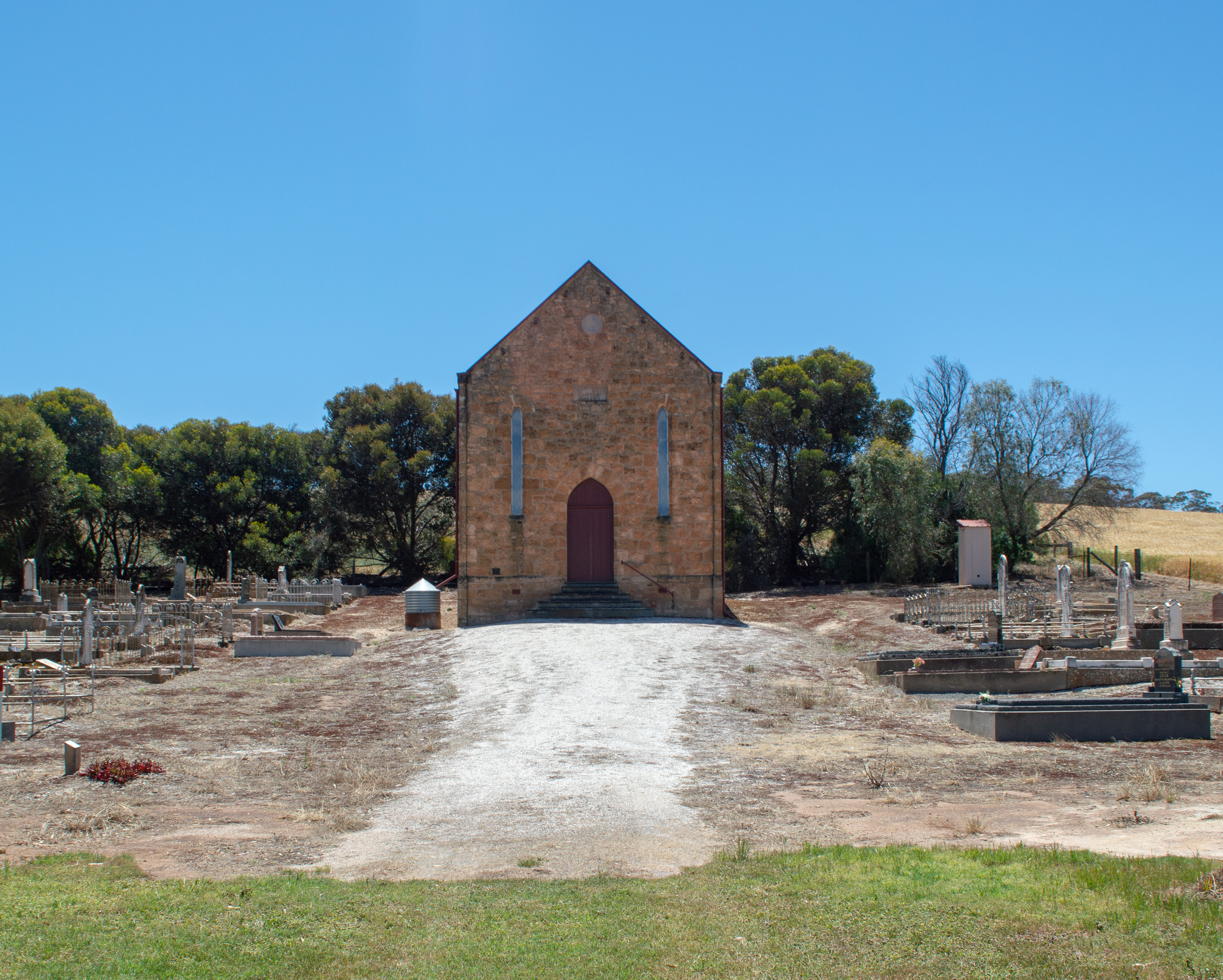
Former Methodist church

== Transportation ==
Woolshed Flat Road runs from the town of Rhynie on the Horrocks Highway (Main North Road) through Woolshed Flat to the Balaklava Road near Halbury.
