= Halbury, South Australia =

Halbury South Australia
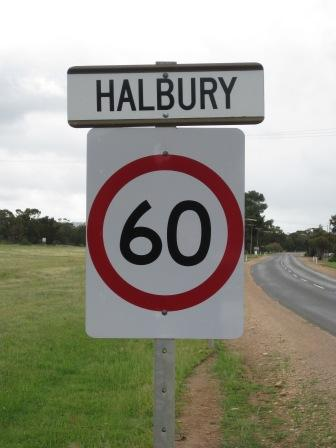
- Western entry sign, Halbury

- Coordinates: 34°05′0″S 138°31′0″E
- Population: 211 (SAL 2021)
- Postcode(s): 5461
- Location: 114 km (71 mi) north of Adelaide; 21 km (13 mi) west of Auburn; 11.5 km (7 mi) east of Balaklava
- LGA(s): Wakefield Regional Council; District Council of Clare and Gilbert Valleys
- Region: Mid North
- State electorate(s): Goyder
- Federal division(s): Grey
Localities around Halbury:
Stow	Hoyleton	Auburn
Watchman	Halbury	Woolshed Flat
Balaklava	Owen	Salter Springs

Halbury is a former railway town in South Australia, west of the Clare Valley, halfway between Balaklava and Auburn.

== Etymology ==
Halbury is situated in the Hundred of Hall, named after politician George Hall.

== Railway ==
Halbury was a stop on the Port Wakefield railway line, an isolated narrow gauge horse-drawn railway connecting to the port at Port Wakefield from Balaklava and Hoyleton. Halbury was where this railway crossed the Gulf Road from Auburn and Burra to the port.

The Gladstone railway line ran from Hamley Bridge through Balaklava to Blyth and further on into the Mid North of the state. The line was originally narrow gauge 1,067 mm (3 ft 6 in), but was converted to broad gauge 1,600 mm (5 ft 3 in) in 1927. Due to various reasons, this particular line became obsolete and the tracks were dismantled in the late 1980s. After Halbury, the railway line veered to the north-east, travelling on to the towns of Hoyleton, Kybunga and further north to Blyth.

The railway siding at Halbury was opened in 1870 and closed to all goods and parcels traffic in 1981. Station brand: "HY". Station code number 1274. Railway distance from Adelaide: 74 miles, 1 chain.

== Shamus Liptrot Cycling Trail ==
The former Halbury to Balaklava railway line was re-opened as a 12 km low-gradient cycling trail in 2016, named after elite junior local cyclist Shamus Liptrot who died in 2011, several years after suffering serious injuries in a cycling accident. The trail extends from Balaklava to Halbury, Shamus's home town. The trail is the central link of the 26 km Copper Trail, which extends from Leasingham in the Clare Valley, to Port Wakefield at the head of the Gulf St Vincent.

== Railway Signboard Project ==
In 2022, to commemorate the railway history of the area, a group of Christian railway enthusiasts reinstalled an exact replica of the original Halbury railway station sign.

The text on the plaque affixed to the sign reads: "This is the site of the Halbury railway siding, 74 Miles, 1 Chain. 1870 – 1981. Sign made and reinstalled Easter 2022 by J. Leigh and E. Green, Railway Infrastructure Services. This sign would not be here if not for Lorraine Zaharuiko, 1984-2021. John 3:16-21."

== Government ==
The township of Halbury in the west of the locality is in the Wakefield Regional Council local government area. The hillier east of the locality is part of the District Council of Clare and Gilbert Valleys.

== Gallery ==
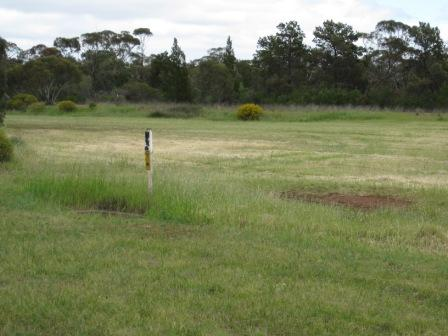
Former railway yard site

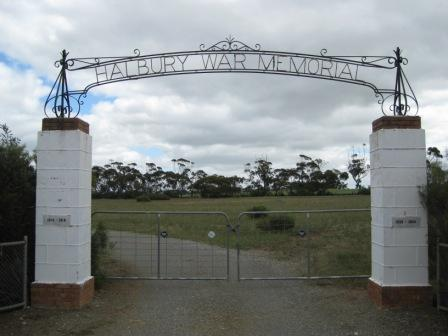
War Memorial gate

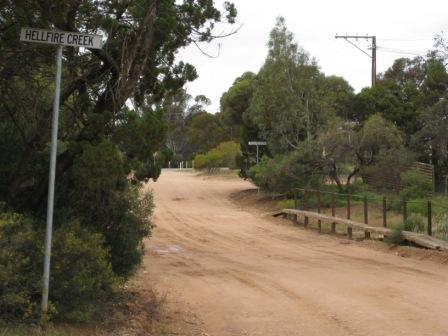
Ford at Hellfire Creek

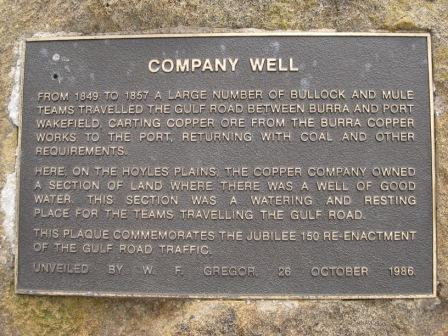
Copper Trail monument, east of Halbury

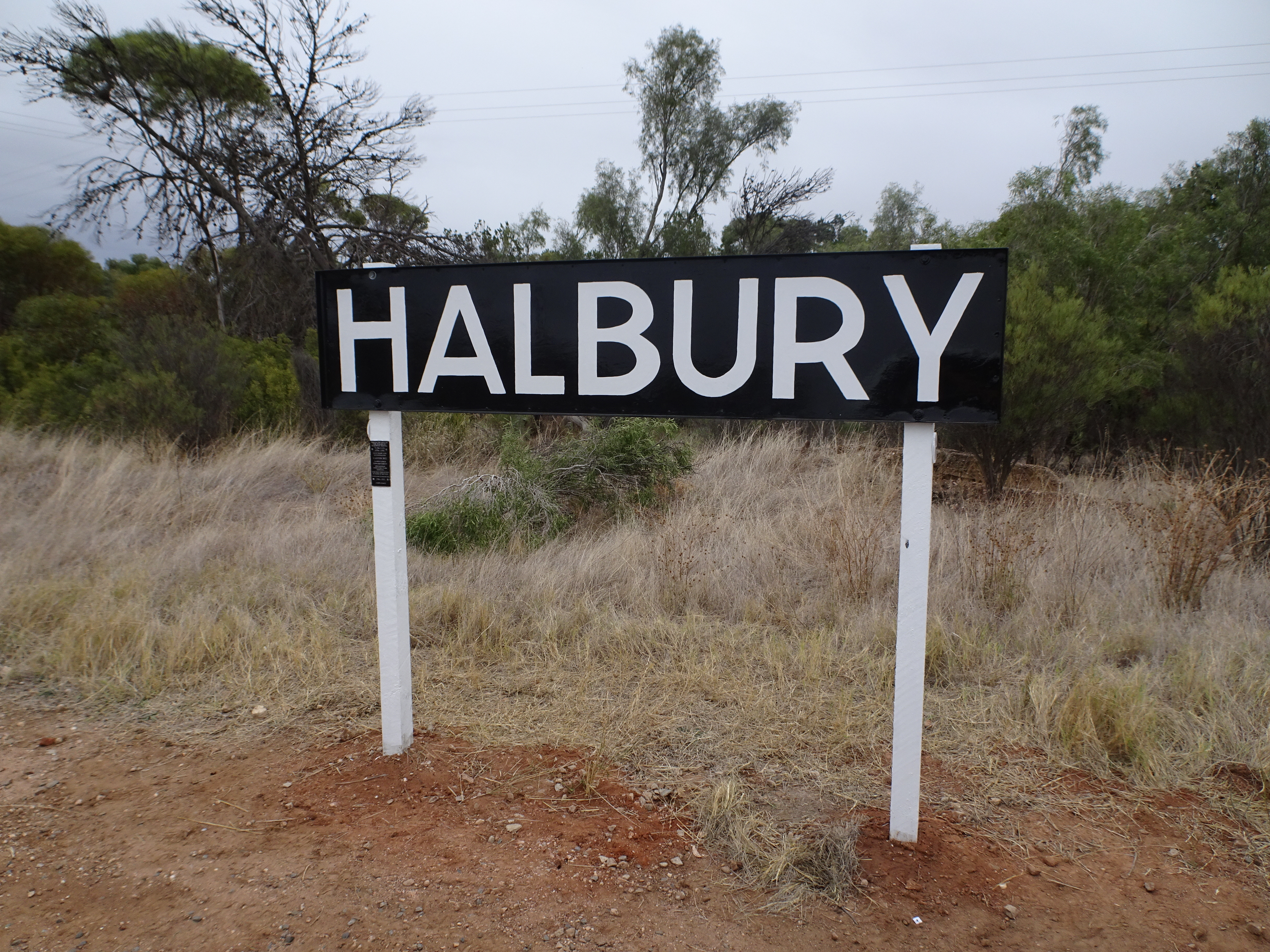
The new Halbury railway station sign, as installed

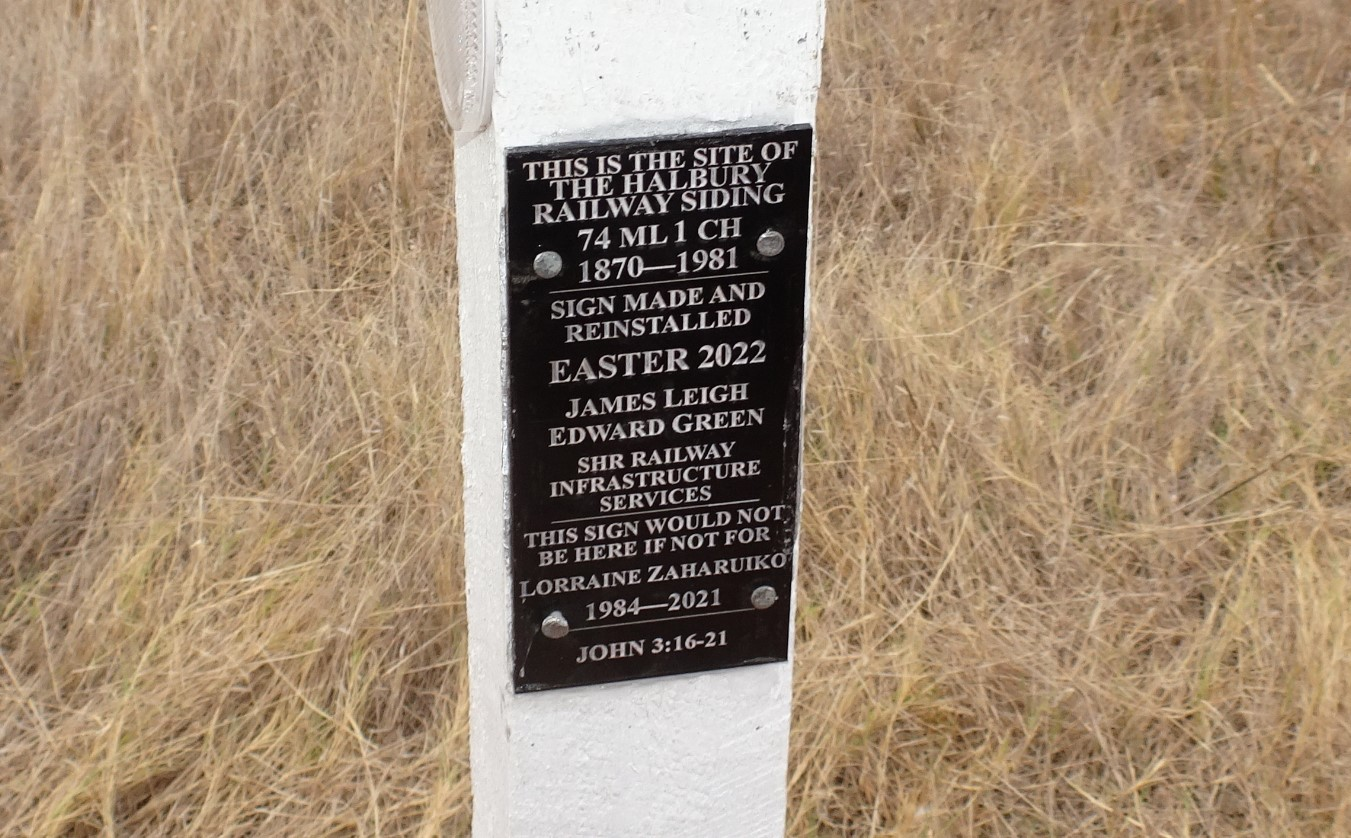
The plaque affixed to the new railway station sign
