= Wasleys, South Australia =

Wasleys
- Town
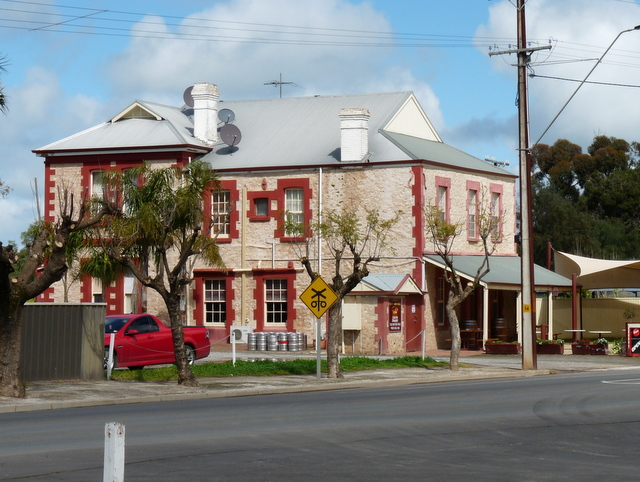
- Wasleys Hotel in 2010

- Coordinates: 34°28′S 138°40′E
- Country: Australia
- State: South Australia
- LGA: Light Regional Council

Government
  - State electorate: Light
  - Federal division: Grey

Population
  - Total: 661 (UCL 2021)
- Time zone: UTC+9:30 (ACST)
  - Summer (DST): UTC+10:30 (ACDT)
- Postcode: 5400

Wasleys is a small town north-west of Gawler, South Australia. Roseworthy College is located around 6 km (3.7 mi) south of the town.

== History ==
The town is named after Joseph Wasley, who arrived in the colony of South Australia in 1838. After having been a successful miner at Burra in South Australia as well as the Victorian goldfields, he took up five sections in the Hundred of Mudla Wirra (which had been established in 1847), known as the Mudla Wirra Forest.

The name mudla wirra comes from the Kaurna language, but may have been misinterpreted in multiple sources, perhaps arising from the online version of Manning's Index. It has been reported that mudla means" implement", giving rise to the translation "a forest where implements are obtained", but in a newer publication (revised in 2012), Manning writes "Professor Tindale says that an alternative derivation is based on the word mudla meaning ‘nose’" (as in the Kaurna name for the Lefevre Peninsula, mudlanga. and other sources confirm this. Tindale and many others based their work on the work of German missionaries Teichelmann and Schürmann, who compiled a grammar and wordlist of the Kaurna language in 1840. In this work, mudla is recorded as meaning "nose", while mudli means implement.

After British colonisation of South Australia, some early settlers in the region made notable contributions to Australian agriculture:

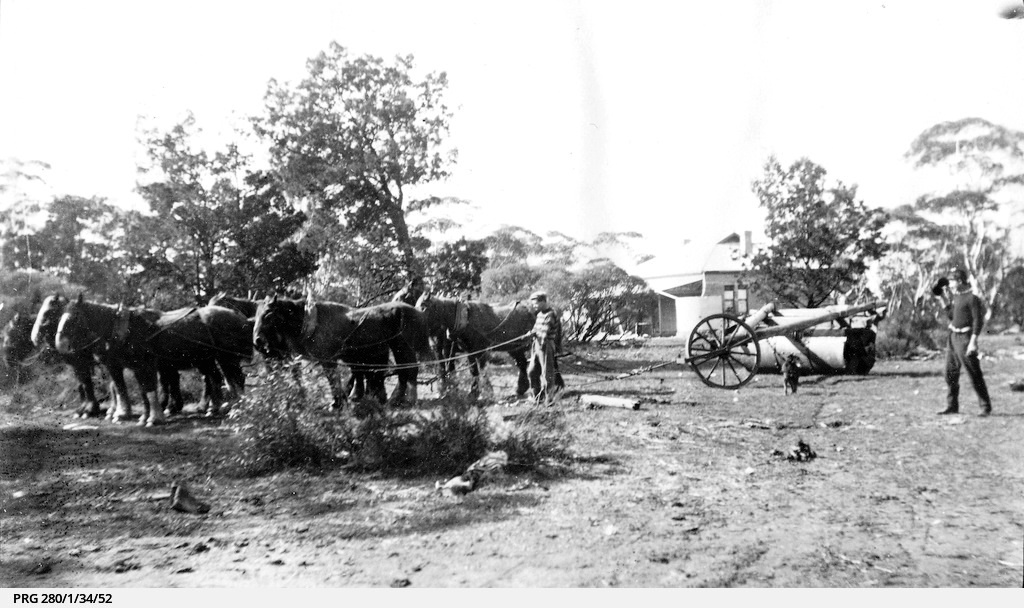
Later use of the mullenising process, c.1922

- In 1843, John Ridley invented a machine known as "Ridley's Stripper", which removed the heads of grain, with the threshing being done later by a separate machine.
- In the 1860s, a local farmer named Charles Mullen, an Irish immigrant, created a method of ploughing which was known as "mullenising", using what became known as a scrub roller or mallee roller. Mullen invented an implement, used throughout Australia, which was the precursor of the stump-jump plough.
- In 1866–1877, farmer Richard Marshall's experiments with cross-breeding various wheat varieties and improving soil conditions using bone meal on the land led to a reduction of the "red rust" problem in wheat.

In 1869, the Peterborough railway line was built through the region, and a railway station was erected on the land purchased by Wasley. The railway line was built to transport the mallee roots that had been cleared from land in the district. In the same year, a post office with telegraph facilities was established.

In 1873, two townships were laid out on either side of the railway line: Ridley on the hotel side and Wasleys on the other. George Thompson, a printer who lived in North Adelaide was responsible for laying out the Wasleys. By September 1873, Wasleys had been fully laid out, and a local newspaper publicised the achievement in a short article about "Wasley Township" stating "There can be no question that this is an excellent locality for a township", going on to say that it "[had] been laid out for the proprietor (Mr. G. Thomson) by Mr. Warren, and is very conveniently situated on the north side of the Mallala and Templers road, [with] the Railway Station occupying the opposite or south side. The settlement was advertised as "Ridley Township - Wasleys Station", seeking to attract people looking for good agricultural land, later splitting into two townships, called Ridleyton and Wasleys. The Wasleys plots were auctioned, while Ridley plots were sold privately.

A Wesleyan church was built in 1873 and a school established in it the following year. Wasleys thrived, with three chaff mills operating at one point, none of which survive today. By 1909 there was a wheelwright, several stores and private dwellings, and an Institute incorporating a library. In 1928 there were 337 inhabitants, and a daily train service to Adelaide.

On 12 April 1970, a bus collided with a passenger train on the road from Wasleys to Gawler, killing 17 people and injuring more than 40.

In 2015, the Pinery bushfire burned through the township of Wasleys, gutting the lawn bowls club and post office.

== Gallery ==
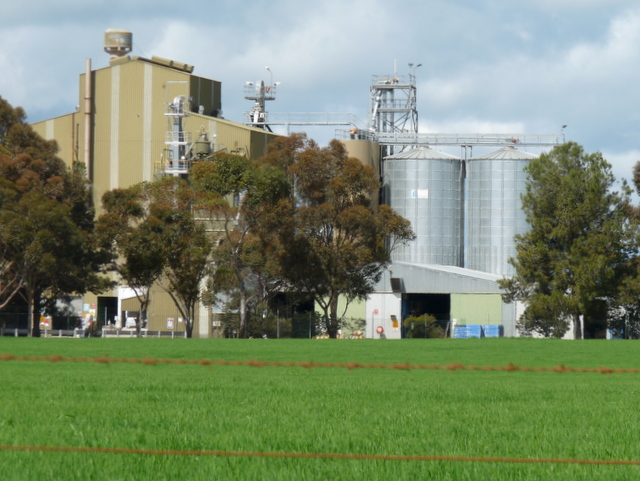
Wasley

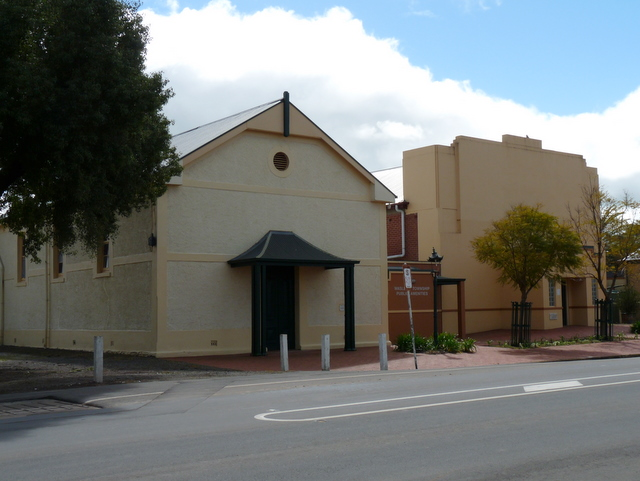
Wasley Institute

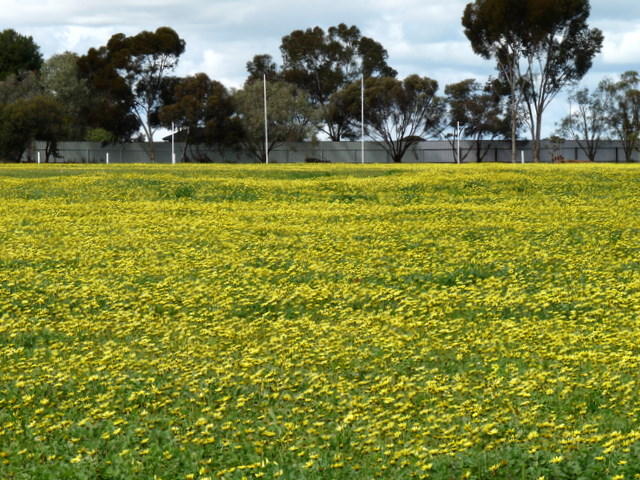
Oval
