= Mallala, South Australia =

Mallala
- Town
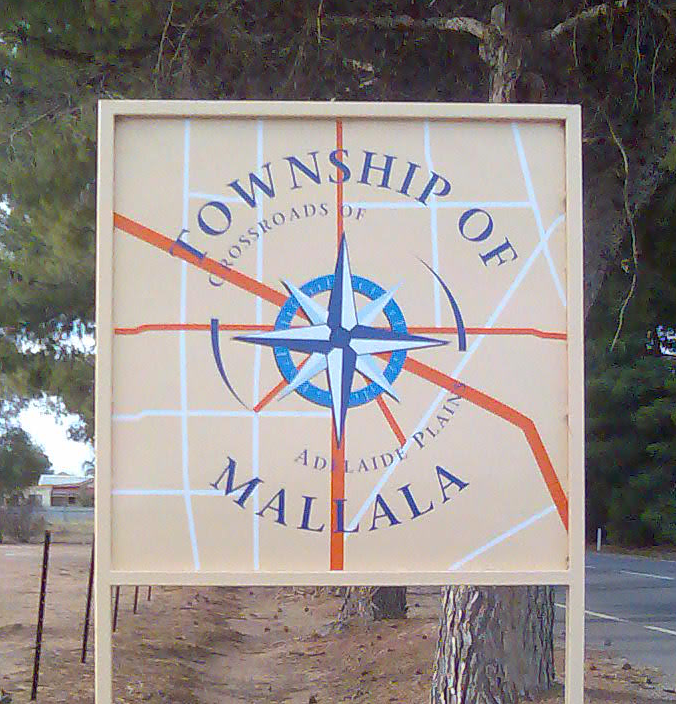

- Coordinates: 34°26′22″S 138°30′30″E
- Country: Australia
- State: South Australia
- Region: Barossa Light and Lower North
- LGA: Adelaide Plains Council
- Established: 1851 (town); 5 June 1997 (locality)

Government
  - State electorate: Narungga
  - Federal division: Grey
- Elevation: 41 m (135 ft)

Population
  - Total: 887 (UCL 2021)
- Time zone: UTC+9:30 (ACST)
  - Summer (DST): UTC+10:30 (ACST)
- Postcode: 5502
- County: Gawler
- Mean max temp: 23.7 °C (74.7 °F)
- Mean min temp: 9.7 °C (49.5 °F)
- Annual rainfall: 393.5 mm (15.49 in)
Localities around Mallala
Calomba	Grace Plains	Barabba
Calomba; Dublin	Mallala	Barabba; Pinkerton Plains
Lower Light	Lower Light; Korunye; Redbanks	Redbanks

Mallala (/ˌmæləˈlɑː/ mal-ə-LAH) is a township and locality in the Australian state of South Australia 62 kilometres (39 mi) by road north of the state capital of Adelaide. The name is thought to be derived from the Kaurna word madlala or madlola, meaning "place of the ground frog". In the 2021 census, the wider Mallala locality had a population of 1042, of whom 887 lived in the township.

== Etymology ==
The word "Mallala" is derived from the Aboriginal "Madlola" – a place of the ground frog – according to South Australian historian Geoffrey Manning.

== History ==
Mallala is located within the traditional lands of the Kaurna people.

The first land taken up in the district was in 1851 by Phillip Butler, under occupational licence. The Butler property was called Mallala Station, and the town of Mallala developed in the vicinity. The large runs of the pastoralists were cut up into smaller holdings, which sold for £1 per acre to new settlers, and created a continuous series of small farms.

Amongst the early pioneers were Messrs John Forby, Robert & George Marshman, Samuel Crouch, Peter Farrelly, H.B. Moody, W. Jarmyn, Samuel Chivell, J. McCabe, John Murphy, W. Jury, A. Vawser, M.H. East, N.J.W. Lindsay and John Forbes. The descendants of many of these men and their families still live in this district.

The first private subdivision, on Section 60, was called Mallala South (also known as New Mallala) and was later followed by private subdivisions of Section 51 and 266. These were referred to as the Mallala subdivisions. Later, part section 276 and 277 were divided, and this subdivision was known as the Mallala Extension. Although Mallala had existed as a town for many years, it was not until 27 March 1925 that Mallala was approved as a subdivision name by the Nomenclature Committee.

The present township lies midway between the hills and the sea, fifty-eight kilometres north of Adelaide. An impressive War Memorial stands at the hub of an eight-road intersection in the centre of the town.

A now departed industry was the East Brothers Machinery works, who for over a century manufactured farm equipment which was sold widely across Australia. The town once had a very impressive flour mill where the townsfolk used to grind the locally produced wheat, but the building fell into disuse as the industry centralised. Today the mill is used as a museum for the local historical committee.

== Built environs ==
=== World War I memorial ===
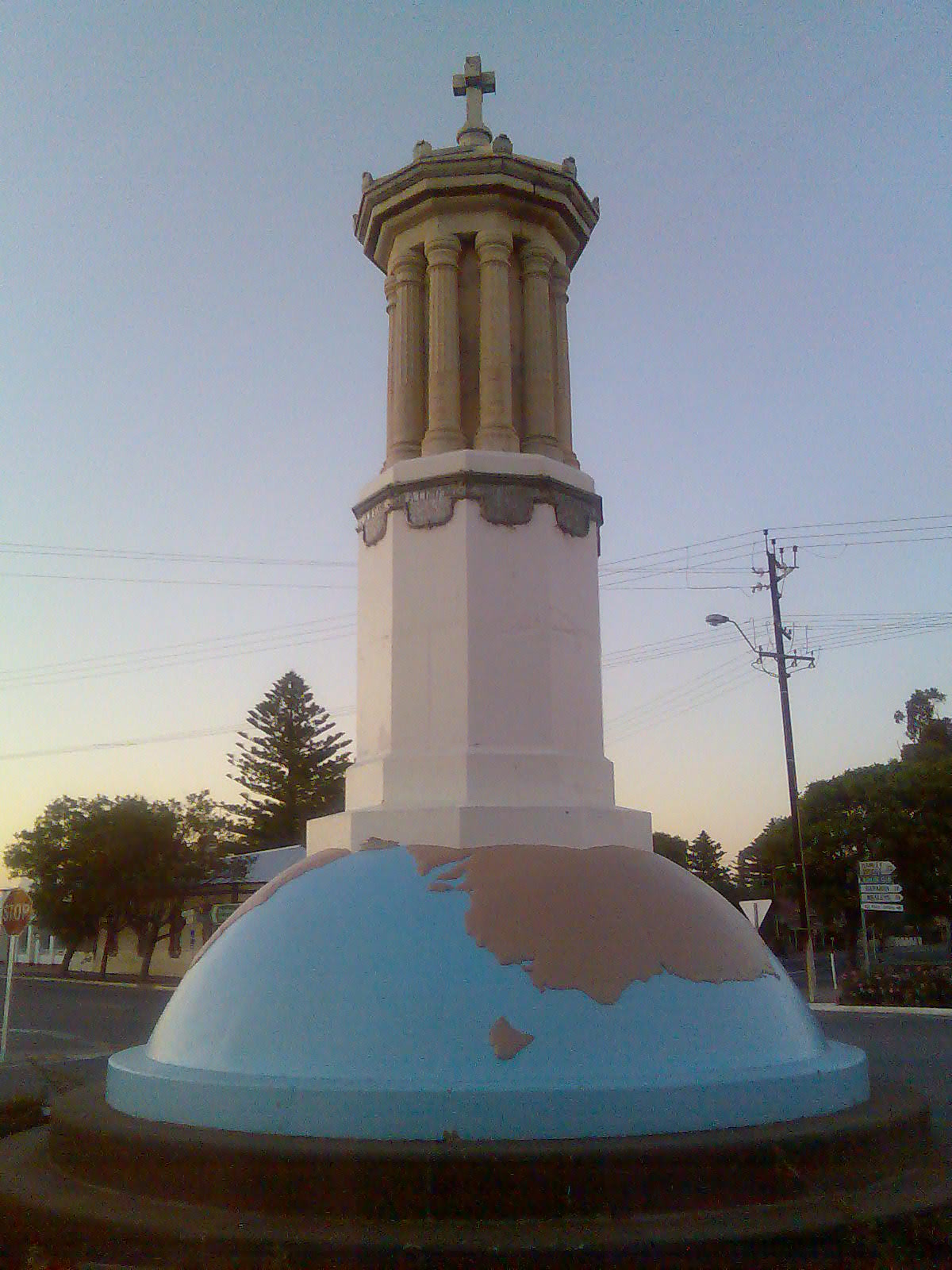
World War I Memorial at Mallala's Centre

At Mallala's centre is a World War I war memorial in the centre of the intersection of eight roads. Its insignia reads: "In honour of ten men who died in defence of home and liberty" in memory of ten local men who were killed in Egypt, France and Palestine. The memorial consists of a base made of ten granite stones in each step of the base topped with ten arched stones to form a hemisphere showing a map of Australia. The hemisphere supports a ten-sided column the names of the ten soldiers which is topped by ten marble pillars and a plinth displaying the Cross of Sacrifice. The history of the ten soldiers and the broader service history of the district forms a major collection at the Mallala Museum.

=== Hospitals ===
The first private hospital opened at 35 Owen Road in 1941 and closed in 1943. Owen Road renamed Aerodrome Road after the Aerodrome opened. The Mallala District Hospital, later Mallala Community Hospital opened in 1953 at 30 Aerodrome Rd and closed May 2015.

=== RAAF Base Mallala and Mallala Motor Sport Park ===
In 1939 the Royal Australian Air Force established a base called RAAF Base Mallala to the north of the Mallala township. The base was originally used for advanced training for RAAF pilots. The base was subsequently closed in May 1960 and the land was sold at auction in early 1961. Later that year the then 3.38 km (2.1 mi) Mallala Race Circuit opened on 19 August 1961, and less than two months later was the chosen site for the 1961 Australian Grand Prix. The circuit, now totalling 2.601 km (1.616 mi), has also hosted rounds of the Australian Touring Car Championship, the V8 Supercar Development Series as well as the Australian Drivers' Championship. Mallala Motor Sport Park, as the circuit is now known, is also used by the South Australian Police for driver training and assessment, and hosts the Historic Mallala event, held in April each year.

=== Mallala Equestrian Centre ===
The international standard equestrian centre east of the township is the venue for national show jumping and related event competitions.

== Governance ==
Mallala is located in the federal division of Grey, the state electoral district of Frome and the local government area of the Adelaide Plains Council. Mallala is the seat of Adelaide Plains Council.

== See also ==
- Mallala (disambiguation)
