= Salisbury North Football Club =

Salisbury North

Names
- Full name: Salisbury North Football Club
- Nickname: Hawks

Club details
- Founded: 1954; 72 years ago
- Colours: Green Gold
- Competition: Adelaide Footy League
- Ground: Salisbury North Oval, Salisbury North

Other information
- Official website: snfc.com.au

The Salisbury North Football Club, nicknamed the Hawks, is an Australian rules football club based in Salisbury North, South Australia, a northern suburb of Adelaide. The club was formed in 1954 and currently competes in the Adelaide Footy League.

The club's traditional colours are green and yellow and its home ground is Salisbury North Oval on Bagster Road.

== History ==
=== Formation and Gawler Football League ===
Salisbury North Football Club was formed in early 1954 as the newly developed Salisbury North area was being settled by residents moving into South Australian Housing Trust homes. The club's history names brothers Les and Clarrie Window, Russell Stopp and Jimmy Banks among those involved in its establishment.

A report in The Advertiser on 29 January 1954 described Salisbury North as a "newly formed" football club and reported that it had decided to apply for admission to A Grade of the "Gawler football competition". About 60 prospective players had offered their services, including former Woodville player Clarence Hearn. A general meeting was scheduled to be held at the Housing Trust shops at Salisbury North on 9 February.

Salisbury North entered the Gawler & District Football League in 1954, wearing green and yellow and playing its home matches at Bagster Road. In its first season the club wore jumpers supplied by the South Adelaide Football Club. Its original clubrooms were constructed from wooden packing cases obtained from the General Motors-Holden factory.

Future Magarey Medal winner Gary Window appeared for Salisbury North in its inaugural season while aged 13. In a July 1954 match against South Gawler, Window replaced the injured T. Pascoe during the game.

Salisbury North reached the Gawler & Districts Football League grand final in its second season, losing the 1955 decider to South Gawler, 14.6 to 7.7.

=== Central Districts Football Association ===
In 1961 Salisbury North transferred from the Gawler competition to the newly formed Central District Football Association (CDFA). The new competition included Salisbury North, Salisbury, Elizabeth, Elizabeth North, Central District and Two Wells-Virginia.

Salisbury North won the inaugural CDFA A Grade premiership in 1961. The club subsequently won further A Grade premierships in 1963, 1965, 1972, 1974, 1975, 1976 and 1978.

The club began fielding junior sides in 1961.

Salisbury North Oval was developed with assistance from businessman and councillor Ron White, who provided equipment used to transfer couch grass from the Little Para River.

By the mid-1960s the ground was being used regularly for senior football. In April 1966 Salisbury North hosted Thompson Football Club in a pre-season trial match at Salisbury North Oval, which was later described by The Standard as an "excellent trial".

=== South Australian Football Association and Northern Metropolitan Football League ===
Following the 1978 season, Salisbury North joined the South Australian Football Association (SAFA) in 1979.

The club later returned to the northern metropolitan competition and won consecutive A Grade premierships in 1989 and 1990. By this period the former Central Districts Football Association was known as the Northern Metropolitan Football League.

Salisbury North subsequently returned to SAFA. When SAFA folded after the 1995 season, Salisbury North joined the South Australian Amateur Football League, later renamed the Adelaide Footy League.

=== Adelaide Footy League era ===
Salisbury North has remained a member of the South Australian Amateur Football League, now known as the Adelaide Footy League.

In 2026 the club competed in Division 1.

Salisbury North won its first Adelaide Footy League Division 1 premiership in 2026, defeating Glenunga 9.13 (67) to 8.7 (55) at Norwood Oval. The Hawks had trailed 27–1 at quarter-time before recovering to win by 12 points.

Playing-coach Luke Habel was unable to play in the grand final after becoming ill and spending the morning in hospital, but coached the team from the sidelines. Louie McLennan was named best on ground, while Tyrell Hocking kicked three goals.

The premiership ended a 36-year top-grade premiership drought dating from Salisbury North's 1990 Northern Metropolitan Football League premiership.

=== Club development ===
The club's facilities developed considerably from the original packing-case clubrooms. In 1994 the club was granted a gaming machine licence for 26 machines. A $1.3 million redevelopment was completed in November 1996.

According to the club, membership increased from approximately 380 before the introduction of gaming machines to about 6,300 by 1999, while the number of employees increased from one to 32.

The Hawks Over 50s Club was formed in 1998. In 2005 the club spent a further $950,000 upgrading the Anstey Bar and constructing bingo facilities.

The Salisbury North Football Club was named Club of the Year in 1997, and in 2024 received Clubs SA awards for Best Bar, Best Dining, Best Gaming and Club of the Year.

== A Grade premierships ==
Salisbury North has won the following senior A Grade premierships:

Year	Competition
1961	Central Districts Football Association
1963	Central Districts Football Association
1965	Central Districts Football Association
1972	Central Districts Football Association
1974	Central Districts Football Association
1975	Central Districts Football Association
1976	Central Districts Football Association
1978	Central Districts Football Association
1989	Northern Metropolitan Football League
1990	Northern Metropolitan Football League
2026	Adelaide Footy League Division 1

== Notable players ==
The club has produced or been associated with a number of players who later competed in the South Australian National Football League or Australian Football League. Its published history lists Gary Window, Spog Wiley, Sammy Donovan, Wilbur Wilson, John Spaans, Rene Van Dommelle, Malcolm McGrath, Jamie Thomas, Greg Edwards, Darren Clohessey, Gavin Wanganeen, Troy Bond, Shane Bond, Ricky O'Loughlin, Michael O'Loughlin, Joe Hay, Ricky Stoynoff, Brad Robertson, Cory Reichert, David Buckley and Callum Hay among players who either played junior football at Salisbury North or represented the club before entering higher-level football.

=== Gary Window ===
Gary Window played for Salisbury North during the club's inaugural 1954 season while aged 13. Window later played for Central District Football Club and became the club's first Magarey Medal winner.

=== Gavin Wanganeen ===
Gavin Wanganeen played junior football at Salisbury North before entering the SANFL system. Wanganeen later recalled that Troy and Shane Bond and Michael O'Loughlin were also playing at Salisbury North during his junior years.

== See also ==
- Adelaide Footy League
- Australian rules football in South Australia
