= APFL =

APFL is an acronym which may represent:

- Adelaide Plains Football League, an Australian rules football league
- American Professional Football League, name adopted by the American Professional Football Association in 1921, one year before changing its name again to the National Football League
- American Professional Football League, a former indoor football league that operated in mid-west United States
