= South Gawler Football Club =

Australian rules football club

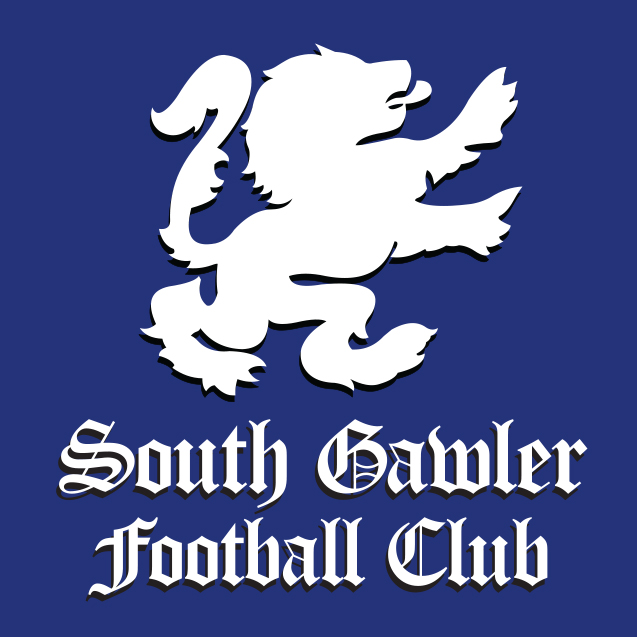

Names
- Full name: South Gawler Football Club Inc.
- Nickname: The Lions

2026 season
- After finals: Premiers
- Leading goalkicker: Riley Nottle (Senior Colts)
- Best and fairest: Cody Gilchrist

Club details
- Founded: 21 March 1889; 137 years ago
- Colours
- Competition: Barossa Light & Gawler Football Association
- President: Cosie Costa
- Coach: Gavin Chaplin
- Captain(s): Jackson Press, Flynn Pisani
- Premierships: 40 (6 in BLGFA - most recent: 2026)
- Ground: Eldred Riggs Reserve, Evanston, South Australia

Uniforms
Home

Other information
- Official website: southgawlerfc.com

The South Gawler Football Club is a country Australian rules football club, founded by James Fitzgerald in the Gawler South area of the town of Gawler, South Australia, in 1889. The Lions, who wear royal blue and white stripes, currently compete in the Barossa Light & Gawler Football Association. Their club and oval today situated at Eldred Riggs Reserve, Evanston, in Gawler.

== History ==
On the evening of Thursday 21 March 1889, a meeting of people interested in the formation of a football club at Gawler South was held at the Mill Inn (that site today the corner of Seventh Street and Adelaide Road, just before the Murray Street Bridge). About 30 persons were present, with Fitzgerald elected to the chair. He explained the object of the meeting was to form a junior club in the locality for now, to join a senior association likely to be formed in Gawler in the near future; to then thereby "...increase interest in the game by endeavouring to get more matches on for juniors, so that by practice some useful players could be brought out". Fitzgerald was elected captain, George Sanderson vice captain, and Tom Willett would be the first secretary. The colors decided on were red-and-blue with white bands. Although by 1890 Gawler South had changed their colours to blue and white.

On Saturday 30 March 1889, the first opening intraclub match of the new club was played at Para Para, starting at 3pm with 40 players turning out on a warm day. The first official competition game was against the Salisbury Football Club on 20 April 1889 at Salisbury. The final scores were Gawler South 2.7 defeating Salisbury 1.2. The goal scorers for Souths were Fitzgerald and Arthurs, who were also amongst the best players. Gawler South then became an inaugural member of the Gawler Junior Football Association (which eventually became the Gawler Football Association) formed on Tuesday 23 April 1889 by delegates from the following three clubs - South, (Gawler) Centrals and Willaston. The GFA was renamed to the Gawler and Districts Football League in 1953. In 1955, Gawler South first adopted the Rampant Lion as its emblem. And in 1957, the original "Gawler South" name for the club taken from the suburb, was replaced by the title "South Gawler" – to describe the area.

The Lions (often also nicknamed "Southies") have produced some champion footballers, many who have played first class senior football in the South Australian National Football League (SANFL) and the Australian Football League (AFL) as well as representing South Australia. Sam Butler became South Gawler's first fully professional footballer with the AFL's West Coast Eagles in 2004 and a member of the Eagles' 2006 Premiership team. Defender Yves Sibenaler Jr played in seven SANFL Premierships (2003, 2004, 2005, 2007, 2008, 2009, 2010) for Central District, while Alan Obst (a 2007 Premiership player also with the Bulldogs) was listed with AFL clubs Adelaide and North Melbourne. During the twentieth century, Walter "Winky" Price (a triple premiership player with West Adelaide), Ron May (who was at North Adelaide between 1924 and 1933; and a league premiership player in 1930), Lawrie Rusby (who played 172 league games for South Adelaide including premierships in 1935 and 1941) and Irishman Robin Mulholland (112 games for Central District) also represented South Australia in State-of-Origin during celebrated careers in the SANFL. While Stephen Officer played for South Melbourne in the Victorian Football League between 1971 and 1975.

According to a number of forums covering country Australian Rules football, South Gawler is possibly one of the most successful football clubs in Australia. Following the 2026 BLGFA title, with 40 first-grade premierships recorded and verified, discussion since 2008 suggests that the Lions have accumulated the equal second-most premierships in South Australia and (as of September 2026) are possibly the equal-seventh winningest Australian Rules club in Australia.

While success at senior level had initially eluded them in the new century, South Gawler remained buoyant with their junior development programs continuing to consistently produce success. The club's Junior Colts were undefeated back-to-back premiers in 2005–2006. They then won the flag in 2012 and 2015, while the Senior Colts' completed a hat-trick of premierships from 2009 to 2011, again in 2013 and were crowned back-to-back premiers again in 2019 and 2020.

In 2017, women's football began with the BLGW so South created the Lionesses – first entering a senior team in the following 2018 season. Several players emerged, including Tegan Nottle – who was selected on the wing for state country in that inaugural season. In 2022, Captain-Coach Aisha Thomas won the Lionesses' first Association best and fairest. In season 2023, the Under 16 Girls team claimed the club's first BLGW premiership (at any level) within five years.

In 2021 the Lions finally broke their longest senior men's premiership drought (since 1993) in the club's 135-year history. After 28 years (an interim during which they finished runners up in 1996, 2014 and 2020) South came back from a 57-point deficit halfway through the second quarter to overturn arch-rivals Willaston by one goal in the 2021 Grand Final at Elliott Goodger Park. The Lions at last would claim their fourth BLGFA title and 38th senior premiership. It is one of the greatest comeback victories in SA country football Grand Final history, and quite likely the greatest turnaround in any BLGFA final ever. 2021 was further punctuated by the club winning the first ever inaugural BLGFA Under 13s premiership for a new junior grade, while the Reserves were runners-up.

Season 2022 saw both the A Grade and Reserves make the Grand Final once again, however with a reversal of fortunes. While the second senior team were crowned Premiers; their first title since 2012, the A Grade who had dominated all season to be favourites were upset by Nuriootpa.

In 2023, at their fourth Grand Final in a row, the A Grade achieved redemption – rebounding after a 1-point defeat by Nuriootpa in the First Semi Final to then overcome the Tigers by 12 points in the Grand Final, before a record crowd at Lyndoch Oval. South Gawler's 39th senior men's title since 1889. While the Reserves and Under 13s were upset in their Grand Finals after finishing top at the end of the minor round.

In 2024, the undefeated Under 15s claimed the Lions' eleventh Junior Colt premiership overall while the Reserves were runners up.

The Junior Colts would also win the 2025 title, going back-to-back undefeated. The Senior Colts would also win their nineteenth title in 2025. The Reserves made a fifth consecutive Grand Final – in their fourteenth consecutive year of finals too - but only to fall agonisingly short again by a single point.

In 2026, the Lions were named the Champion Club of the BLGFA once again after all five of its participating men's sides finished the regular season top-two. The Mini League, Senior Colts, Reserves and A Grade then made the Grand Final. Before South secured a historic Triple Premiership in the seniors, seconds and thirds, while the Under 13s were runners-up.

In 137 years, the Lions have enjoyed a sequential Double Premiership (an A and B Grade flag in the same year) now fifteen times (1906, 1907, 1920, 1921, 1922, 1923, 1924, 1960, 1961, 1969, 1970, 1974, 1979, 1986 and 2026). A sequential Triple Premiership (of a first, second and senior colts team) has only ever happened five times – hat-tricks in 1960, 1969, 1970, 1974 and now 2026.

1960 was one of the greatest years of all time when all three South Gawler sides (A Grade, Reserves and Colts) made the Grand Final and were crowned Premiers undefeated. The Lions won three premierships (from four teams) in four Grand Finals in 1974, and three premierships (from five teams) in four Grand Finals in 2026.

== Premierships ==
Gawler Football Association
1891, 1893, 1894, 1899, 1901, 1902, 1906, 1907, 1909, 1910, 1911, 1920, 1921, 1922, 1923, 1924, 1925, 1927, 1929, 1931, 1932, 1934, 1952
Gawler and District Football League
1954, 1955, 1960
Adelaide Plains Football League
1961
Gawler and District Football League
1963, 1967, 1969, 1970, 1974, 1979, 1986
Barossa, Light and Gawler Football Association
1990, 1992, 1993, 2021, 2023, 2026

== Life Members ==
1891 – J. Fitzgerald, T.H. Willett
1934 – A. Sweeney, C.A. Rau, E. Higgins
1947 – E. Mahoney, H. Freeman, G. Mahoney, R. Byrne
1953 – P. Giles, F. Hutchins
1954 – W.T. Causby
1958 – A.C. Nottle, G.E. Nottle
1960 – S.N. Edmonds, H.J. Smith
1961 – H.C. Adams, R.B. Gordon, R.F. Martin
1965 – R.J. Argent, G.S. Shannon, B. Nottle, G. Newberry, R.J. Shannon, J.A. Gleeson
1966 – R. Symes, J.W. Nottle
1968 – M.V. Heinrich, K.M. Jones, C. Freak Jnr, D.H. Freak
1969 – D.A. Clark, T. Stockton, T.E. Gleeson, R.J. Riggs, R.J. Charnstrom, B.P. O'Donoghue
1970 – B. Long
1971 – D.S. Rolton, Mrs D.R. McDonald, Mrs C.J. Clark
1972 – Mrs M. Mahoney, B. Deuter, I. McDonald, J.L.P. O'Reilly
1973 – E. Officer
1975 – P.J.W. Gevers, W.W. Isgar
1978 – R.E. Officer, G. Hurst
1979 – E.P. Alwood
1980 – A.H. Russell, J.T. Symes
1982 – Mrs D.J. Symes
1985 – A.P. Jenkins, G.P. Short
1986 – L.G. Clark
1989 – M.K. O'Reilly, K.P. O'Reilly
1992 – X. Sibenaler
1993 – R.J. Hutchins
1998 – C. Bloffwitch, Z. Okunieff
2003 – Mrs L. Officer, P. Montgomerie, Ms M. Wohlstadt
2004 – R.J. O'Donoghue
2005 – J.F. Daly, D.C. Ellis
2009 – R. Ahrens
2010 – P. Bain
2012 – K. Bevis
2014 – K. Barker, G. Barker
2015 – Mrs. J. Hewett
2016 – G. Davies
2018 – D. Barker, C. Hurst
2019 – G. Schultz, D. Cash
2023 – W.F. Paternoster, B. Craig, L. McVicar, J. Callander, S. Rolton, G. McCollum, D. Kiryk, J. Costa, K. Hewett
2026 – C. Argent, P. Reichstein, C. Costa, E. Schwerdt, J. Brown

== State of Origin Footballers ==
Peter Swift – South Adelaide, South Australia
Cecil Adcock – South Adelaide, South Australia
Charlie Waters – South Adelaide, South Australia
E.H. Cockram – South Adelaide, South Australia
"Winky" Price – West Adelaide, South Australia
Lawrie Rusby – South Adelaide, South Australia
Robin Mulholland – Central District, South Australia

== VFL / AFL League Footballers ==
Stephen Officer – South Melbourne (1971–72, 1975)
Sam Butler – Central District, West Coast (2004–2017), East Perth, Perth
Alan Obst – Central District, Adelaide, North Melbourne, North Adelaide

== SANFL League Footballers ==
Jimmy Fitzgerald – Gawler (1887 - 1890 SAFA)
George Sanderson – Gawler (1887 - 1890 SAFA)
Fred May – South Adelaide
Toby Arthur – South Adelaide
Sid Coles – North Adelaide
Doug Thomson – Sturt
Tom Doherty – South Adelaide
Tom Woods – North Adelaide
Fred Rusby – North Adelaide
Eddie Henwood – South Adelaide
G.A. Titus – Norwood
Wally Ayling – North Adelaide
Perce Crump – South Adelaide / Norwood
Howard Abbott – Port Adelaide
Ron May – North Adelaide
Arthur Lamb – North Adelaide
Jim Wainwright – North Adelaide
Bruce Causby – Sturt
John Nottle – Sturt
Bob Edmonds – Central District
Yves Sibenaler – Central District
Anton Noack – Central District
Kym Harrison – Woodville
Chris Hurst – Central District
Gary Sutton – Central District
Aaron Bevis – Central District
Kane Officer – Central District
Yves M. Sibenaler – Central District
Nathan Bartsch – Central District
Brodie Hudson – Central District
Paul Marschall – Central District / Adelaide
Marcus Barreau – Central District
Jordan Tippins – Central District
Lachlan Arnold – North Adelaide / Port Adelaide
Joseph Fenwick – Glenelg

== SANFLW League Footballers ==
Sophie Bevis – Central District

== Expatriate SANFL / WAFL / VFL League Footballers ==
Dick Shirley – West Torrens
Barry Walker – West Torrens
Kevin Webber – Central District
Peter Burford – Sturt
Alf Skuse – South Adelaide
Mick Daly – Central District
Lyndon Fairclough – Central District
Mark Maloney – Central District
Ken Russell – Central District
Bing Munn – West Adelaide
Clayton Pethick – North Adelaide
Darrell Moss – Glenelg
James Fuller – South Adelaide / Woodville
Graham Schultz – South Adelaide / Central District
Peter Beythien – Central District
Steven Riley – Central District
Brendan Little – North Adelaide / Central District
David Bubner – Central District
Peter Hart – North Adelaide
Malcolm McGrath – Central District
Tano Barilla – Central District
Joe Trimboli – Central District
Garth Newton – Woodville
Ian Dettman – Woodville
Lindsay Nicholls – North Adelaide / Norwood
Steven Hann – North Adelaide / Port Adelaide
Gavin Chaplin – West Perth / Central District
Scott Norton – Central District
Robert Fraser – Central District
Nick Prokopec – Central District / West Adelaide
Heath Lawry – Williamstown (Collingwood) / Central District
Aaron Bayliss – West Adelaide
Matt Lutze – West Adelaide
Chris Musolino – Central District
Chad O'Sullivan – Central District / North Adelaide
Jackson Press – Woodville-West Torrens
Dean Cutting – Central District
Jack Osborn – Adelaide / Sturt
Domenic Costanzo – Adelaide
Josh Wittwer – Adelaide
Steve Burton – Central District / Adelaide
Emmanuel Irra – Port Adelaide / South Adelaide / Norwood
Kye Roberts – Port Adelaide
Brock Castree – Central District / Adelaide / North Adelaide

== Expatriate SANFLW League Footballers ==
Aisha Thomas – Central District

== South Australia State Country Footballers ==
1986 – Brett Riggs
1994 – Eddie Schwerdt
1995 – Eddie Schwerdt
2022 – Patrick White
2022 – Steve Burton
2022 – Flynn Pisani
2023 – Patrick White
2023 – Flynn Pisani
2024 – Patrick White
2024 – Steve Burton

== South Australia State Country Footballers (Women's) ==
2019 – Tegan Nottle

== South Australia State Under-age Footballers ==
1951 – Brenton Nottle
1955 – Ray Gordon
1985 – Brett Riggs
1986 – Matthew Dittmar
1986 – Darren Joyce
1997 – Aaron Bevis
2003 – Sam Butler
2005 – Alan Obst
2024 – Jermaine Miller
2025 – Jermaine Miller
2026 – Josh Munday

== Association Best and Fairest ==
Gawler Football Association
1912 Mail Medal – Winky Price
1923 P.J. Broderick Medal – H. Bentley / A.R. May
1927 P.J. Broderick Medal – P. Baldwin
1936 Mail Medal – Eddie Mahoney
1937 Mail Medal – Eddie Mahoney
1938 Mail Medal – Eddie Mahoney
1941 W. Wiles Trophy – M. Williams
1947 Page Trophy – Bob Gordon
1948 Page Trophy – Bob Gordon
Gawler and District Football League
1954 Mail Trophy – Stan Edmonds
1957 Mail Trophy – John Nottle
1963 Mail Trophy – Dean Clark
1970 Mail Trophy – Xavier Sibenaler
1975 Mail Trophy – Mick Daly
1976 Mail Trophy – Kym Stoddard
1983 Bunyip Medal – Graham Schultz
Barossa, Light and Gawler Football Association
1989 Linke and Mail Medals – Eddie Schwerdt
1992 Linke and Mail Medals – Eddie Schwerdt
1995 Linke and Mail Medals – Eddie Schwerdt
2002 Linke and Mail Medals – Ben Halliday
2022 Schluter Medal – Steve Burton
2023 Schluter and Mail Medals – Steve Burton

BLGW
2022 Central District Football Club BLGW Trophy – Aisha Thomas

== Ten Year Players ==
Jacob Ahern
Ted Alwood
Craig Argent
Robert Argent
Peter Bain
Garry Barker
Martin Bartholomew
Nathan Bartsch
William Beckmann
Aaron Bevis
Andrew Bevis
Darren Bloffwitch
Tyson Bowden
Adrian Brown
Jeffrey Brown
Jamahl Butler
James Callander
Clayton Cameron
Robert Charnstrom
Des Clark
Tim Clift
Brian Congdon
Robert Copson
Adrian Costa
Jonathan Costa
Brenton Craig
Matthew Daly
Jackson Dare
Barry Deuter
Stan Edmonds
Damien Ellis
Scott Evans
Callum Fielke
Matt Foldesdy
Craig Fowler
Brian Freak
Claude Freak Jr
Doug Freak
Shaun Fulton
Tom Gleeson
Tyson Gordon
Daniel Goulding
Ben Greatorex
Dennis Grigg
Alex Hansen
Simon Head
Denis Heinrich
Harold Heinrich
Max Heinrich
Norman Khan Heinrich
Kevin Hewett
Lachlan Hewett
Craig Hiskins
Brodie Hudson
Levi Hudson
Christopher Hurst
John Hutchins
Chris James
Garry James
Kevin Jones
Darren Joyce
Peter Joyce
Brock Judd-Smith
Darcy Judd-Smith
Barry Klose
Brian Long
Eddie Mahoney
Lee Makris
Maurice Martin
Robert Martin
Fred May
Ron May
Gary McCollum
Alan McDonald
Ian McDonald
Scott McDonald
Jake McVicar
Sam Montgomerie
Matt Naumann
Gerald Newberry
Steven Nicolai
Brenton Nottle
Charlie Nottle
George Nottle
Len Nottle
Robert Officer
Zenon Okunieff
Robert O’Donoghue
Shane O’Donoghue
Grant O’Reilly
Alan Pearce
Anthony Pilichiewicz
Colin Power
Jackson Press
Walter Price
Matthew Rana
Eddie Rau
Charlie Riggs
Ron Riggs
Shane Riggs
Ross Rigney
David Rolton
Stephen Rolton
Fred Rusby
Lawrie Rusby
Eddie Schwerdt
George Scotland
Victor Sergejevs
Eric Sexton
Graham Shannon
Graham Shrubsole
Xavier Sibenaler
Rod Smith
Jake Spicer
Andrew Springbett
Robert Sutton
Tom Symes
Keith Trenowden
Matthew Walker
Patrick White
William Wright

== Premiership Totals by Year and Grade ==
A Grade (40)
1891, 1893, 1894, 1899, 1901, 1902, 1906, 1907, 1909, 1910, 1911, 1920, 1921, 1922, 1923, 1924, 1925, 1927, 1929, 1931, 1932, 1934, 1952, 1954, 1955, 1960, 1961, 1963, 1967, 1969, 1970, 1974, 1979, 1986, 1990, 1992, 1993, 2021, 2023, 2026

Reserves (33)
1905, 1906, 1907, 1915, 1920, 1921, 1922, 1923, 1924, 1930, 1951, 1959, 1960, 1961, 1962, 1964, 1966, 1969, 1970, 1971, 1972, 1973, 1974, 1979, 1980, 1983, 1984, 1986, 1987, 1999, 2012, 2022, 2026

C Grade (-)

Colts / Senior Colts (20)
1960, 1965, 1968, 1969, 1970, 1971, 1972, 1974, 1975, 1976, 1977, 1988, 2009, 2010, 2011, 2013, 2019, 2020, 2025, 2026

Junior Colts (13)
1959, 1975, 1985, 1993, 1995, 2001, 2005, 2006, 2008, 2012, 2015, 2024, 2025

Mini League - boys (1)
2021

Senior Women (-)

Under 16 - girls (1)
2023

Under 13 - girls (-)
