= Gawler & District Football League =

Australian rules football competition

- Most recent season or competition: 1986
- Formerly: Gawler Football Association
- Sport: Australian rules football
- Founded: 23 April 1889
- Folded: 1986
- No. of teams: 6 (1986), 25 (historical)
- Country: Australia
- Last champion: South Gawler (1986)

The Gawler & District Football League was an Australian rules football competition based around the town of Gawler in South Australia. In 1987 it merged with the Barossa and Light Football Association, to form an expanded regional league, the Barossa Light & Gawler Football Association.

== History ==
On the 19th of March 1889, a meeting was held by the at the Gawler Institute in the evening for the purpose of forming a Junior Club, and also to co-operate with the Willaston and Gawler South Clubs in forming an Association. It was decided to form a club to be called the "Gawler Central Club." Mr. R, H. Barnet was appointed captain, Mr. J. W. Doherty vice-captain, Meesrs. Porter, Cheek, Morris, and McMamara committee; Messrs. Barnet, Doherty, and Porter Match Committee.

The question of forming a Junior Association was then discussed, and Messrs. Ross, Doherty, and Barnet were appointed delegates to meet those from the other clubs. The Gawler Junior Football Association was formed on Tuesday 23 April 1889 by delegates from the following three clubs - Gawler South, Gawler Central and Willaston. In 1893 Gawler Central and South Gawler were declared Joint Premiers as no playoff was arranged. In 1897 Roseworthy Agricultural College, which is located 10km north-west of Gawler, joined the GFA to create a four team competition.

=== 1900–1950 Gawler Football Association ===
On Wednesday 28 March 1900 the old Gawler Football Association was dissolved. At a special meeting held in the evening with the three Gawler clubs represented it was resolved to form a new Association. The following motion was carried unanimously - That the Gawler Football Association be disbanded and dissolved from this date, and that the Hon. Secretary prepare a statement of the position of the association as soon as possible, with the accounts duly audited.

On Thursday 3 May 1900, at a meeting held at the St. Joseph's School room of approximately 50 Gawler Irishmen, it was resolved "That a club, consisting exclusively of Irishmen, be formed, to be called the Gawler Shamrock Football Club." The colours decided upon were blue stockings, knickers and guernseys, with green hoop.

In 1900 a match was played at Gawler against the Adelaide and Suburban Association and it was hoped that this would become an annual event.

In April 1903, at the Annual General Meeting a letter was received from the Shamrock Club informing the Association that they had disbanded.

In 1904 on 23 June, Gawler 7 goals 9 behinds defeated an interstate Juniors team from Victoria 2 goals 8 behinds. It was reported there was a good attendance of spectators at the Gawler Recreation Oval.

Salisbury Football Club joined the Gawler Association for the first time in 1911. The season ended in controversy when Gawler South were accused of deliberately losing in the last round to Willaston therefore preventing Salisbury from qualifying for the Finals. Gawler South were initially disqualified at meeting by 9 votes to 4. However, on Appeal were reinstated. Gawler South defeated Willaston to take the Premiership.

On 13 May 1911, Gawler hosted SAFL Club West Torrens losing 5 goals 6 behinds (36) to 10 goals 16 behinds (76). James Tierney, the 1908 Magarey Medalist, was one of the best players for Gawler. Tierney had played ruck for South Australia and 4 SAFL Clubs (West, South and North Adelaide and West Torrens) between 1901 and 1911.

Mr E Johns Senior, a delegate from North Adelaide was transferred to Gawler by the Postal Department in 1912. He was soon elected to chairman of the and was instrumental in the Association applying for admission to the South Australia Football League.

On 2 Dec 1912, the South Australia Football League granted Gawler admission to the senior competition in Adelaide as the eighth Club for the zone, covering the Electoral District of Barossa. Its colors were registered as follows: Black jersey with pink hoop, white knickers and black-and-pink hose. However, just before the start of the 1913 season the club withdrew due to loss of a number of prominent players from the District and the depressed condition of the sport locally.

In 1919, following the end of WW1 the GFA resumed on 3 May with the following 5 clubs - Gawler Centrals, South Gawler, Willaston, Roseworthy College and Salisbury. Gawler South would go on to dominate during the 1920s, winning six premierships in a row between 1920 and 1925

On 18 October 1924 a match organised by Sports and Games Committee of Adelaide was played between the Gawler Association and a team of Aboriginal Australians from Murray and Point Pearce stations at Jubilee Oval (Adelaide). The Aboriginal team won a good game of football by 12.19 to 10.17.

In 1926 there was no A grade competition following College's withdrawal to join an inter-collegiate competition with schools in Adelaide. Salisbury, after years of dissatisfaction with the GFA's administration, also left to join the North Adelaide District Football Association. An attempt was made to have two Gawler A grade teams (South and Centrals) compete in the Barossa and Light Association but the vote to allow them to join failed, with only the Angaston delegates voting in favour. There was a fear that a single Gawler team would be too strong and two teams meant additional travel to Gawler for the Barossa teams. Despite the senior competition disbanding, there was a B grade competition with six clubs that competed with a rule that no A grade players were permitted. South Gawler, Rovers, Centrals, Willaston, Roseworthy College and Lyndoch participated.

Following several suggestions including separate districts from which teams are to be chosen or a combined Gawler team to compete in Barossa and Light Association the competition was re-formed in 1927 with 5 clubs - Gawler Centrals, South, Rovers, Lyndoch and Willaston. Lyndoch did not end up making the start of the season and were replaced by Hamley Bridge. Gawler Rovers were a new club consisting of young men from Gawler South. Hamley Bridge collected the Minor Premiership with 10 wins from 12 games. In the First Semi-Final Gawler Centrals defeated Hamley Bridge. As minor premiers, Hamley Bridge enjoyed the right of challenge, however they would lose the Grand Final to Gawler South.

In 1929 the A-grade competition expanded to seven teams with Williamstown joining and changing their name to Lyndoch-Williamstown. Hamley Bridge left to rejoin the Gibert Football Association while Roseworthy College and Salisbury rejoined.

In 1934, Sandy Creek dropped out and the B Grade Association comprised 7 teams - Gawler South, Centrals, Rovers, Roseworthy College and teams from Lyndoch, Smithfield and Angle Vale.

In 1935 letters were written to the Bunyip paper suggesting scrapping the B League and for the Association to have three teams supporting a supreme team from Gawler representing the Association in the SAFL The following year saw a GFA proposal to admit a team to SANFL rejected by the league on the grounds of costs to the other clubs, with the question of Gawler's admission be held in abeyance for a year.

Salisbury left to join the Lower North Association in 1937. Roseworthy College won their first premiership for 25 years in 1938. C. Haines from the College Team won the Drop kick competition with a distance of 66 yards, 2 feet, 3 inches (over 60 meters).

In 1939 District Football was trialled with 4 teams (Gawler South, Central, Roseworthy College and Willaston) and it was agreed to continue with it in 1940. Gawler Rovers joined the Lower North Association in 1939, but returned in 1941. Competition continued until the end of the 1941 season, after which it went into recess for the duration of World War 2.

On Monday 15 February 1946 a public meeting was held to discuss resumption of football post World War 2. The meeting was chaired by Mr. E.J. Foord who expressed his pleasure at having present the Gawler Football Association President Mr. W. Antwis and Mr. V. Paternoster, a member of the Oval Advisory Committee, as well as so many other enthusiasts. The chairman also offered apologies for Mr. Duncan, M.P., who was unable to attend, but who assured Gawler Football of his help and support.

Representatives of Roseworthy College, Willaston, Gawler South, and Gawler Rover Clubs, who were all members of the Gawler Football Association in the last year of active football (1941) expressed their clubs' desires to continue in the Association. Delegates from the Gawler Colts Club expressed their wish to keep its club intact and affiliate with the Association. Gentlemen from Kangaroo Flat were hopeful that that district would be able to form a club to compete in the 1946 football competition, and that they had a prospective oval in view. A recommendation was made that the Colts and Kangaroo Flat Clubs be asked to join the Football Association. In reply to a question, Mr. J. McLcod said he was holding the property of the Central Club, which had been one of the affiliated clubs for many years, and he was confident that Centrals would not field a team. A further recommendation was made that the Association affiliate with the S.A. National Football League.

On 8 March 1946, Mr. E.J. Foord, Chairman of the Gawler Football Association for 14 years, was succeeded by Mr. M.G. Best. Kangaroo Flat decided not to enter a team in the 'A' Grade competition but instead competed in the B Grade. Football would resume on 27 April, with the following clubs participating:

A Grade: Gawler South, Colts, Rovers (colours - Black and White), Roseworthy College, Sandy Creek, Willaston

B Grade : Gawler South, Kangaroo Flat, Roseworthy College, Smithfield, Virginia, Willaston

During the year football matches were also organised between the various hotels in Gawler, including the Criterion, Gawler Arms, Commercial Hotel and the Railway Hotel.

1947 saw the District system reintroduced. The clubs were made to choose from players resident in their stipulated areas.. With the North and South Para Rivers as district boundaries the districts were defined as follows - between the two rivers (Centrals), south of the South Para (Gawler South) and north of the North Para (Willaston). The Roseworthy College and Sandy Creek teams remained in the Association and the Virginia club was invited to join the Association to have six teams. On Friday 9 May 1947 the Rover Football Club wound up with dinner held in the Gawler Arms Hotel with fifty members present. The club donated its jerseys and equipment to the High School. Salisbury re-joined in 1949.

=== 1951-1952 Gawler and District Football Association ===
In 1951 the A and B Grade Associations amalgamated under the name of the Gawler and District Football Association.

=== 1953–1986 Gawler and District Football League ===
In 1953, the Association was renamed Gawler and District Football League at the request of the SANFL. Applications for affiliation from Lyndoch (A Grade), Roseworthy (B Grade) and Smithfield (B Grade) were accepted. Virginia applied for a transfer from A to B Grade. The teams for the renamed league included:

A Grade - Gawler South, Gawler Central, Willaston, College, Salisbury and Lyndoch (6 teams)

B Grade - Gawler South, Gawler Central, Willaston, College, Salisbury, Virginia, Smithfield, Roseworthy, Two Wells (9 teams)

1954 saw Salisbury North join the A Grade whilst Lyndoch moved to the B Grade.

In 1961 Salisbury, Salisbury North, Elizabeth, Elizabeth North withdrew from the Gawler and District Football League to form the Central District Football Association along with Central District and Two Wells-Virginia.

The G&DFL merged with the Barossa & Light Football Association to form the Barossa Light & Gawler Football Association after the 1986 season.

== Clubs ==
=== Final ===
| Club | Colours | Nickname | Home Ground | Former League | Est. | Years in G&DFL | G&DFL Senior Premierships | | Fate |
| Club | Colours | Nickname | Home Ground | Former League | Est. | Years in G&DFL | Total | Years | Fate |
|---|---|---|---|---|---|---|---|---|---|
| Barossa District | | Bulldogs | Williamstown Oval, Williamstown | – | 1979 | 1980-1986 | 1 | 1982 | Moved to Hills FL in 1987 |
| Gawler Central | (1891)(1950s)(?-1986) | Tigers | Gawler Oval, Gawler | – | 1889 | 1889-1986 | 14 | 1890, 1892, 1893, 1895, 1898, 1900, 1904, 1905, 1914, 1919, 1926, 1936, 1953, 1983 | Formed Barossa Light & Gawler FA in 1987 |
| South Gawler (Gawler South 1889-1956) | (1924-25)(1960)(?-1986) | Lions | South Gawler Oval, Evanston | APFL | 1889 | 1889-1960, 1963-1986 | 33 | 1891, 1893, 1894, 1899, 1901, 1902, 1906, 1907, 1909, 1910, 1911, 1920, 1921, 1922, 1923, 1924, 1925, 1927, 1929, 1931, 1932, 1934, 1952, 1954, 1955, 1960, 1963, 1967, 1969, 1970, 1974, 1979, 1986 | Played in Adelaide Plains FL in 1961-62. Formed Barossa Light & Gawler FA in 1987 |
| Two Wells | (1948-58)(1975-86) | Roosters | Two Wells Oval, Two Wells | – | 1908 | 1948-1958, 1975-1986 | 5 | 1957, 1975, 1976, 1977, 1981 | Played merged with Virginia between 1959-74. Moved to Adelaide Plains FL in 1987 |
| Virginia | (1920-58)(1981-86) | Rams | Virginia Sports Oval, Virginia | APFL, LNFA, CDFA | 1907 | 1920-1925, 1932-1935, 1946-1958, 1981-1986 | 6 | 1946, 1953, 1954, 1955, 1958 1984 | Played in Lower North FA between 1926-31 and 1936-45. Played merged with Two Wells between 1959-74. Re-formed in Central District FA in 1975, returned there in 1987. |
| Willaston | | Donnybrooks | Elliot Goodger Memorial Reserve, Willaston | – | 1889 | 1889-1986 | 20 | 1889, 1896, 1897, 1903, 1915, 1928, 1930, 1933, 1935, 1937, 1939, 1941, 1946, 1947, 1948, 1961, 1972, 1978, 1980, 1985 | Formed Barossa Light & Gawler FA in 1987 |

=== Former ===
| Club | Colours | Nickname | Home Ground | Former League | Est. | Years in G&DFL | G&DFL Senior Premierships | | Fate |
| Club | Colours | Nickname | Home Ground | Former League | Est. | Years in G&DFL | Total | Years | Fate |
|---|---|---|---|---|---|---|---|---|---|
| Angle Vale (1) | | | Angle Vale Oval, Angle Vale | LNFA | 1926 | 1934-1935 | 1 | 1935 | Returned to Lower North FA in 1936 |
| Elizabeth | | Eagles | Ridley Reserve, Elizabeth | – | 1956 | 1956-1960 | 2 | 1956, 1958 | Formed Central District FA in 1961 |
| Elizabeth North | | | | – | 1955 | 1955-1960 | 0 | - | Formed Central District FA in 1961 |
| Greenock | | | Centenary Park, Greenock | B&MVFA | 1890 | 1957-1958 | 0 | - | Folded after 1958 season |
| Hamley Bridge | (1927)(1968)(1980s) | Magpies | Hamley Bridge Sports and Community Centre, Hamley Bridge | WFA, APFL | 1899 | 1910, 1927-1929, 1964-1983 | 1 | 1968 | Played in Wooroora FA from 1911-26. Moved to Barossa & Light FA in 1930. Moved to Adelaide Plains FL in 1984 |
| Kangaroo Flat | | Roos | Kangaroo Flat | – | 1946 | 1946-1947 | 1 | 1947 | Moved to Lower North FA in 1948 |
| Lyndoch | (1924-25) (1926-29)(1930-79) | Eagles | Lyndoch Oval, Lyndoch | LNFA | 1903 | 1924-1935, 1953-1954, 1960-1979 | 1 | 1965 | Entered recess in 1936 and again in 1955 until 1959. Merged with Williamstown Rovers to form Barossa District after 1979 season. |
| Roseworthy | (1962)(1964) | Roosters | Oval opposite Leitch's Roseworthy Hotel, Roseworthy | LNFA, APFL | 1920s | 1921, 1953-1960, 1962-1965 | 2 | 1962, 1964 | Entered recess in 1922. Re-formed in Lower North FA in 1948. Played in Adelaide Plains FL in 1961. Merged with Wasleys to form Rurals in 1966. |
| Roseworthy College | (1970s)(1980s) | Panthers | Roseworthy College Oval, Agricultural College, Roseworthy | APFL | 1897 | 1897-1923, 1928-1960, 1964-1984 | 12 | 1907, 1912, 1913, 1938, 1940, 1949, 1950, 1951, 1959, 1966, 1971, 1973 | Played in a college association from 1924-27. Played in Adelaide Plains FL from 1961-63, returned there in 1964. |
| Rovers | (1932)(1945-46) | | Gawler Oval, Gawler | LNFA | 1927 | 1927-1938, 1941-1946 | 0 | - | Moved to Lower North FA in 1939. Folded after 1946 season |
| Rurals | | | Oval opposite Leitch's Roseworthy Hotel, Roseworthy and Wasleys Oval, Wasleys | – | 1966 | 1966 | 0 | - | Folded after 1966 season |
| Salisbury | (1923)(?-1960) | Magpies | Salisbury Oval, Salisbury | NADFA, LNFA | 1883 | 1911-1925, 1929-1932, 1935-1936, 1949-1960 | 2 | 1956, 1957 | Played in North Adelaide DFA between 1926-28. Moved to Lower North FA in 1934 and 1937. Formed Central District FA in 1961 |
| Salisbury North | | Hawks | Salisbury North Oval, Salisbury North | – | 1953 | 1954-1960 | 0 | - | Formed Central District FA in 1961 |
| Sandy Creek | | | Curdnatta Park, Sandy Creek | – | 1932 | 1932, 1946-1948 | 0 | - | Recess from 1933-45. Moved to Lower North FA in 1949 |
| Sedan Cambrai | | Magpies | Cambrai Sportsground, Cambrai | B&MVFA | 1922 | 1957-1958 | 0 | - | Moved to Torrens Valley FA in 1959 |
| Shamrocks | | Shamrocks | Gawler Oval, Gawler | – | 1900 | 1900-1902 | 0 | - | Folded after 1902 season |
| Smithfield | | Panthers | Smithfield Oval, Smithfield | LNFA | 1913 | 1925, 1932-1938, 1946-1947, 1952-1960 | 2 | 1932, 1934 | Entered recess in 1926, re-formed in Lower North FA in 1929. Played in Lower North FA in 1939-45 and 1948-51. Formed Central District FA in 1961 |
| Two Wells-Virginia | | Roosters | Two Wells Oval, Two Wells and Virginia Sports Oval, Virginia | APFL | 1959 | 1959-1960, 1974 | 0 | - | Formed Central District FA in 1961. Split into Two Wells and Virginia in 1975. |
| Wasleys | (1920-23)(1963-65) | | Wasleys Oval, Wasleys | APFL | 1901 | 1920-1923, 1963-1965 | 0 | - | Played in Adelaide Plains FL between 1924-62. Merged with Roseworthy to form Rurals in 1966. |
| Williamstown Rovers | | Rovers | Williamstown Oval, Williamstown | TVFA, HFL | 1908 | 1962-1963, 1974-1979 | 0 | - | Entered recess in 1964, re-formed in Hills FL in 1967. Merged with Lyndoch to form Barossa District in 1980 |

== Premierships ==
=== A Grade ===
| Year | Premier | Score | Runner-up | Notes |
|---|---|---|---|---|
| 1889 | Willaston | | Gawler South | |
| 1890 | Gawler Central | | Gawler South | |
| 1891 | Gawler South | | Willaston | |
| 1892 | Gawler Central | | Gawler South | |
| 1893 | Gawler Central and Gawler South | | | No play-off; both clubs declared joint premiers. |
| 1894 | Gawler South | | Willaston | |
| 1895 | Gawler Central | | Gawler South | |
| 1896 | Willaston | | Gawler South | |
| 1897 | Willaston | | Gawler Central | |
| 1898 | Gawler Central | | Willaston | |
| 1899 | Gawler South | | ? | |
| 1900 | Gawler Central | | Willaston | |
| 1901 | Gawler South | | Gawler Central | 1st South Gawler (undefeated with 9 wins), 2nd - Gawler Central (5 wins - 4 losses), 3rd Willaston (4 wins -5 losses), 4th Shamrocks (9 losses) |
| 1902 | Gawler South | | ? | |
| 1903 | Willaston | 8.13 (61) - 5.11 (41) | Gawler Central | |
| 1904 | Gawler Central | | ? | |
| 1905 | Gawler Central | 10.6 (66) - 7.10 (52) | Gawler South | |
| 1906 | Gawler South | 5.7 (37) - 3.13 (31) | Gawler Central | |
| 1907 | Gawler South | | ? | |
| 1908 | Roseworthy College | 6.12 (48) - 5.6 (36) | Gawler South | |
| 1909 | Gawler South | 10.11 (71) - 6.12 (48) | Roseworthy College | |
| 1910 | Gawler South | 9.14 (68) - 3.8 (26) | Willaston | |
| 1911 | Gawler South | | Willaston | |
| 1912 | Roseworthy College | 8.2 (50) - 6.12 (48) | Gawler South | |
| 1913 | Roseworthy College | 9.12 (66) - 7.8 (50) | Gawler South | |
| 1914 | Gawler Central | 9.6 (60) - 4.7 (31) | Salisbury | |
| 1915 | Willaston | 9.16 (70) - 8.12 (60) | Gawler Central | |
1916-18: G&DFL in recess (WWI)
| 1919 | Gawler Central | 12.11 (83) - 6.12 (48) | Willaston | |
| 1920 | Gawler South | 5.9 (39) - 3.13 (31) | Roseworthy College | |
| 1921 | Gawler South | 12.17 (89) - 6.3 (39) | Gawler Central | |
| 1922 | Gawler South | 8.10 (58) - 4.4 (28) | Salisbury | |
| 1923 | Gawler South | 11.11 (77) - 3.5 (23) | Salisbury | |
| 1924 | Gawler South | 9.16 (70) - 5.8 (38) | Salisbury | |
| 1925 | Gawler South | 7.10 (52) - 5.4 (34) | Gawler Central | |
| 1926 | No A Grade competition | | | |
| 1927 | Gawler South | 12.18 (90) - 6.9 (45) | Hamley Bridge | |
| 1928 | Willaston | 9.9 (63) - 4.19 (43) | Gawler South | |
| 1929 | Gawler South | 9.10 (64) - 4.10 (34) | Salisbury | |
| 1930 | Willaston | 8.21 (69) - 5.12 (42) | Gawler South | |
| 1931 | Gawler South | 6.13 (49) - 5.16 (46) | Willaston | |
| 1932 | Gawler South | 9.19 (73) - 7.7 (49) | Willaston | |
| 1933 | Willaston | 11.14 (80) - 6.9 (45) | Rovers | |
| 1934 | Gawler South | 10.11 (71) - 9.14 (68) | Willaston | |
| 1935 | Willaston | 9.18 (72) - 7.13 (55) | Gawler Central | |
| 1936 | Gawler Central | 8.15 (63) - 6.12 (48) | Willaston | |
| 1937 | Willaston | 10.9 (69) - 5.9 (39) | Gawler Central | |
| 1938 | Roseworthy College | 14.13 (97) - 11.14 (80) | Gawler Central | |
| 1939 | Willaston | 16.13 (109) - 7.6 (48) | Roseworthy College | |
| 1940 | Roseworthy College | 6.10 (46) - 3.9 (27) | Willaston | |
| 1941 | Willaston | 16.11 (113) - 10.4 (64) | Roseworthy College | |
1942-45: G&DFL in recess (WWII)
| 1946 | Willaston | 17.15 (117) - 7.5 (47) | Roseworthy College | |
| 1947 | Willaston | 6.13 (49) - 1.8 (14) | Roseworthy College | |
| 1948 | Willaston | 11.9 (75) - 5.5 (35) | Gawler South | |
| 1949 | Roseworthy College | 10.11 (71) - 7.7 (49) | Willaston | |
| 1950 | Roseworthy College | 11.12 (78) - 4.9 (33) | Gawler Central | |
| 1951 | Roseworthy College | 14.16 (100) - 7.8 (50) | Willaston | |
| 1952 | Gawler South | 10.11 (71) - 7.7 (49) | Roseworthy College | |
| 1953 | Gawler Central | 9.14 (68) - 8.7 (55) | Gawler South | |
| 1954 | Gawler South | 8.15 (57) - 5.8 (38) | Roseworthy College | |
| 1955 | Gawler South | 14.6 (98) - 7.7 (49) | Salisbury North | |
| 1956 | Salisbury | 7.7 (49) - 4.4 (28) | Gawler South | |
| 1957 | Salisbury | 11.8 (74) - 8.6 (54) | South Gawler | |
| 1958 | Elizabeth | 5.8 (38) - 3.11 (29) | South Gawler | |
| 1959 | Roseworthy College | 12.11 (83) - 3.10 (28) | Elizabeth | |
| 1960 | South Gawler | 7.11 (53) - 4.11 (35) | Elizabeth | |
| 1961 | Willaston | 10.10 (70) - 5.14 (44) | Lyndoch | |
| 1962 | Roseworthy | 17.17 (119) - 8.7 (55) | Willaston | |
| 1963 | South Gawler | 10.12 (72) - 9.3 (57) | Gawler Central | |
| 1964 | Roseworthy | 7.15 (57) - 5.4 (34) | Hamley Bridge | |
| 1965 | Lyndoch | 8.7 (55) - 7.9 (51) | Gawler Central | |
| 1966 | Roseworthy College | 16.10 (106) - 9.13 (67) | Lyndoch | |
| 1967 | South Gawler | 9.11 (65) - 8.10 (58) | Hamley Bridge | |
| 1968 | Hamley Bridge | 11.7 (73) - 10.11 (71) | South Gawler | |
| 1969 | South Gawler | 14.10 (88) - 11.6 (72) | Roseworthy College | |
| 1970 | South Gawler | 8.15 (63) - 5.9 (39) | Roseworthy College | |
| 1971 | Roseworthy College | 16.13 (109) - 11.9 (75) | Willaston | |
| 1972 | Willaston | 22.23 (155) - 16.9 (105) | Lyndoch | |
| 1973 | Roseworthy College | 11.12 (78) - 11.11 (77) | Willaston | |
| 1974 | South Gawler | 15.12 (102) - 10.9 (69) | Lyndoch | |
| 1975 | Two Wells | 17.17 (119) - 6.14 (50) | South Gawler | |
| 1976 | Two Wells | 18.20 (128) - 14.3 (87) | Willaston | |
| 1977 | Two Wells | 12.12 (84) - 8.13 (61) | Gawler Central | |
| 1978 | Willaston | 18.16 (124) - 17.8 (110) | Lyndoch | |
| 1979 | South Gawler | 21.16 (142) - 21.16 (142) | Gawler Central | Drawn grand final |
| 1979 | South Gawler | 13.17 (95) - 13.14 (92) | Gawler Central | Replay |
| 1980 | Willaston | 14.14 (98) - 12.18 (90) | South Gawler | |
| 1981 | Two Wells | 15.12 (102) - 14.16 (100) | Gawler Central | |
| 1982 | Barossa District | 16.21 (117) - 9.10 (64) | Gawler Central | |
| 1983 | Gawler Central | 17.15 (117) - 16.11 (107) | Willaston | |
| 1984 | Virginia | 14.14 (98) - 11.15 (81) | Two Wells | |
| 1985 | Willaston | 27.17 (179) - 13.10 (88) | Gawler Central | |
| 1986 | South Gawler | 20.14 (134) - 18.9 (117) | Gawler Central | |

=== B grade ===
| Year | Premier | Score | Runner-up | Notes |
|---|---|---|---|---|
| 1920 | Willaston B | 7.1 (43) - 4.3 (27) | Gawler South B | |
| 1921 | Gawler South B | 11.10 (76) - 1.3 (9) | Wasleys | Minor Premiers - Wasleys |
| 1922 | Gawler South B | 3.9 (27) - 0.7 (7) | Wasleys | |
| 1923 | ? | | ? | |
| 1924 | Gawler South B | | | |
| 1925 | Gawler South B | | Gawler Central B | |
| 1926 | Gawler Central | 7.9 (51) - 2.14 (26) | Gawler South | |
| 1927 | ? | | ? | |
| 1928 | Gawler Central B | 10.10 (70) - 7.3 (45) | Willaston B | |
| 1929 | Gawler South B | | ? | |
| 1930 | Gawler South B | | Willaston B | |
| 1931 | ? | | ? | |
| 1932 | Smithfield | 9.18 (72) - 5.2 (32) | Gawler South B | |
| 1933 | Gawler Central B | 10.8 (68) - 3.2 (20) | Roseworthy | |
| 1934 | Smithfield | | Lyndoch | |
| 1935 | Angle Vale | 6.4 (40) - 4.10 (34) | Smithfield | 1st Semi Final - Lyndoch defeated Sandy Creek by 1 pt , 2nd Semi Final - Smithfield 5.3 (33) drew with Angle Vale 4.9 (33). Game to be replayed. Winner was to play Lyndoch for the Premiership |
| 1936 | ? | | ? | |
| 1937 | Willaston B | | Gawler Central B | |
| 1938 | Gawler South B | | Willaston B | |
1939-45: B-grade in recess
| 1946 | Virginia | | Roseworthy College B | |
| 1947 | Kangaroo Flat | 5.6 (36) - 5.5 (35) | Willaston B | |
| 1948 | Willaston B | 5.9 (39) - 4.8 (32) | Roseworthy College B | |
| 1949 | Salisbury B | | Gawler South B | |
| 1950 | Salisbury B | 7.2 (44) - 5.8 (38) | Roseworthy College B | |
| 1951 | Gawler South B | 6.11 (47) - 4.10 (34) | Roseworthy College B | |
| 1952 | Roseworthy College B | 10.11 (71) - 9.10 (64) | Salisbury B | |
| 1953 | Virginia | 10.7 (77) - 7.10 (52) | Smithfield | |
| 1954 | Virginia | 7.10 (52) - 4.14 (38) | Smithfield | |
| 1955 | Virginia | 5.19 (49) - 4.12 (36) | Roseworthy | |
| 1956 | Elizabeth | 3.10 (28) - 2.5 (17) | Virginia | |
| 1957 | Two Wells | 8.15 (63) - 8.8 (56) | Greenock | |
| 1958 | Virginia | 13.9 (87) - 12.4 (76) | Two Wells | |
| 1959 | South Gawler B | 9.3 (57) - 5.7 (37) | Elizabeth B | |
| 1960 | South Gawler B | 5.11 (41) - 0.4 (4) | Elizabeth B | |

== Association Best and Fairest (incomplete) ==
Gawler Football Association

1912 Mail Medal – Winky Price (South Gawler)

1923 P.J. Broderick Medal – H. Bentley / A.R. May (South Gawler)

1927 P.J. Broderick Medal – P. Baldwin (South Gawler)

   1935 A. Dawkins (Gawler Central)

1936 Mail Medal – Eddie Mahoney (South Gawler) 1937 Mail Medal – Eddie Mahoney (South Gawler) 1938 Mail Medal – Eddie Mahoney (South Gawler)

   1939 A. “Babe” Cooper (Gawler Central)

1941 W. Wiles Trophy – M. Williams (South Gawler)

1946 Page Trophy – Len Nelson (Sandy Creek) 1947 Page Trophy – Bob Gordon (South Gawler) 1948 Page Trophy – Bob Gordon (South Gawler)

Gawler and District Football League

   1952 Jim Martin (Gawler Central)
   1953 Len Nelson (Gawler Central)

1954 Mail Trophy – Stan Edmonds (South Gawler)

1957 Mail Trophy – John Nottle (South Gawler)

1963 Mail Trophy – Dean Clark (South Gawler)

1970 Mail Trophy – Xavier Sibenaler (South Gawler)

   1972 Alf Skuse (Gawler Central)

1975 Mail Trophy – Mick Daly (South Gawler)

1976 Mail Trophy – Kym Stoddard (South Gawler)

1983 Bunyip Medal – Graham Schultz (South Gawler)

== Notable players ==
James Tierney - originally from Willaston played a total of 114 games between 1901–1912 for West Adelaide; West Torrens; South Adelaide; North Adelaide in the SAFL and was the 1908 Magarey Medalist. He also represented South Australia 9 times.

David Window played one season for the Norwood Football Club in 1932. He had been a member of a Willaston premiership team in 1930 in the Gawler Association. Window resumed his career with Willaston in 1933. In May of that season he was injured shortly after the start of the Willaston versus Gawler South match at Gawler and was taken to hospital. He played again soon after, won another flag with the club later that year, and continued with Willaston for several more seasons. His brother Clarence played league football for Glenelg, and his nephew Gary won a Magarey Medal in 1965 playing for Central District.

Sonny Morey - originally from Gawler Centrals. Joined Gawler Central Football Club at age 15, winning the under 17's and senior best-and-fairest awards. Recruited to the new SANFL club Central District two weeks before his 19th birthday. He was a member of their first league team in 1964 and having the first kick. First Central District's player to play over 200 SANFL league games and upon retirement in 1977 the last remaining player from the first team. Runner up in the 1972 Margarey Medal to Malcolm Blight. He also represented South Australia 4 times and was inducted into SA Hall of Fame in 2023.
