= Northern Metropolitan Football League =

Australian rules football competition (1961–1994)

The Northern Metropolitan Football League (NMFL) was an Australian rules football competition based in the northern suburbs of Adelaide, South Australia until it folded at the end of the 1994 season. It first formed in 1961 as the Central District Football Association, drawing from the recruiting zone of the Central District Football Club. In 1988, it was renamed the Northern Metropolitan Football League which remained its name until it folded at the end of the 1994 season.

== History ==
1961 - Inaugural six teams - Central District, Elizabeth, Elizabeth North, Salisbury, Salisbury North and Two Wells-Virginia.

== Clubs ==
=== Final ===
Club	Colours	Nickname	Home Ground	Former League	Est.	Years in NMFL	NMFL Senior Premierships		Fate
Club	Colours	Nickname	Home Ground	Former League	Est.	Years in NMFL	Total	Years	Fate
Brahma Lodge		Tigers	Brahma Lodge Oval, Brahma Lodge	–	1962	1962-94 (1962–65 Juniors only)	3	1977, 1993, 1994	Moved to SAAFL in 1995
Central United		Bulldogs	Mofflin Reserve, Elizabeth Vale	–	1962	1962-94 (1962-77 Juniors only)	2	1982, 1984	Moved to SAAFL in 1995
Eastern Park		Demons	Dwight Reserve South, Elizabeth Park	–	1962	1962-94	0	-	Moved to SAAFL in 1995
Elizabeth		Eagles	Elizabeth Oval, Elizabeth	G&DFL	1956	1961-77, 1989-1994	4	1966, 1967, 1973, 1991	Moved to South Australian FA in 1978. Moved to SAAFL in 1995
Salisbury		Magpies	Salisbury Oval, Salisbury	G&DFL	1883	1961-94	7	1968, 1969, 1970, 1971, 1984, 1986, 1988	Moved to SAAFL in 1995
Salisbury North		Hawks	Salisbury North Oval, Salisbury North	G&DFL	1953	1961-78, 1989–91, 1994	10	1961, 1963, 1965, 1972, 1974, 1975, 1976, 1978, 1989, 1990	Moved to South Australian FA in 1979, 1992 and 1995
Salisbury West		Tigers	Salisbury Downs Oval, Salisbury Downs	SAAFL	1965	1965-69, 1978-94	2	1985, 1988	Moved to SAAFL in 1970. Moved to South Australian FA in 1995
Smithfield		Panthers	Smithfield Oval, Smithfield	–	1965	1965-94	1	1992	Moved to SAAFL in 1995
Virginia		Rams	Virginia Sports Oval, Virginia	G&DFL	1907	1975-1980, 1987-94	1	1979	Moved to Gawler & District FL in 1981. Moved to Adelaide Plains FL in 1995

=== Former ===
Club	Colours	Nickname	Home Ground	Former League	Est.	Years in NMFL	NMFL Senior Premierships		Fate
Club	Colours	Nickname	Home Ground	Former League	Est.	Years in NMFL	Total	Most recent	Fate
Athelstone		Raggies	Max Amber Sportfield, Paradise	SAFA	1904	?-1983-?	0	-	Returned to SAFA at unknown date?
Blakeview						1991-93	0	-	Folded
Campbelltown Magill			Campbelltown Memorial Oval, Paradise	SAFA	1976	1980-84	1	1981	Moved to SAAFL in 1985
Central District		Bulldogs	Elizabeth Oval, Elizabeth	NADFA	1960	1961-1963	1	1962	Moved to SANFL B grade in 1964
Elizabeth North				G&DFL	1955	1961-64	1	1964	Folded
Gawler Central thirds		Tigers	Gawler Oval, Gawler	–	1889	1979 (C-Grade)	1	1964	Folded
Hope Valley		Demons	Hope Valley Sporting Club, Hope Valley	SAFA	1906	1980-86	1	1983	Moved to SAAFL in 1987
Ingle Farm		Bulldogs	Rowe Park, Ingle Farm	–	1968	1968-73	0	-	Moved to Norwood-North FA in 1974
Kaurna United						1986-88	0	-	Folded
Mile End		Cats	Railways Oval, Adelaide	SAAFL	1957	1991	0	-	Absorbed by University of South Australia in 1992
Ovingham		Cats	Cane Reserve, Prospect	SMFL	1906	1987-88	0	-	Returned to SAAFL in 1989
Para District Uniting			Parks Community Centre, Angle Park	–	1987	1987	0	-	Moved to SAAFL in 1988
Paralowie		Kangaroos	Yalumba Drive Reserve, Paralowie	–	1979	1979-93	0	-	Moved to SAAFL in 1994
Para Hills		Big Reds	The Paddocks, Para Hills West	SAAFL	1974	1974-77, 1990-91	0	-	Moved to SAAFL in 1978. Moved to South Australian FA in 1992
Pooraka		Bulls	Lindblom Park, Pooraka	NADFA	1920	1969-75	0	-	Moved to Norwood-North FA in 1976
Salisbury College			Salisbury College, Salisbury East	SAAFL	1970	1975-76	0	-	Returned to SAAFL in 1977
Two Wells Virginia				G&DFL	1959	1961-69	0	-	Moved to Adelaide Plains FL in 1970
West Fields		Bloods, Wolves		SAAFL	1960s	1968-84, 1987-89	0	-	Moved to SAAFL in 1985, folded in 1990

== Premierships ==
Year	A1/Division 1	A2/Division 2	A3/C-Grade
1961	Salisbury North		
1962	Central District		
1963	Salisbury North		
1964	Elizabeth North		
1965	Salisbury North		
1966	Elizabeth		
1967	Elizabeth		
1968	Salisbury		
1969	Salisbury		
1970	Salisbury		
1971	Salisbury		
1972	Salisbury North		
1973	Elizabeth		
1974	Salisbury North		
1975	Salisbury North	Salisbury CAE	
1976	Salisbury North		
1977	Brahma Lodge		
1978	Salisbury North	Eastern Park	
1979	Virginia	Brahma Lodge	Westfields
1980	Central United undefeated	Eastern Park	
1981	Campbelltown-Magill	Eastern Park	
1982	Central United	Westfields	
1983	Hope Valley	Westfields	
1984	Salisbury	Westfields	
1985	Salisbury West		
1986	Salisbury		
1987	Salisbury West	Eastern Park	
1988	Salisbury	Ovingham	
1989	Salisbury North	Virginia	
1990	Salisbury North	Virginia	
1991	Elizabeth	Virginia	
1992	Smithfield	Virginia	
1993	Brahma Lodge		
1994	Brahma Lodge		
