= Alan Obst =

Australian rules football player (born 1987)

Personal information
- Full name: Alan Obst
- Born: 19 May 1987 (age 39)
- Original team: Central District (SANFL)
- Draft: 48th overall, 2005: Adelaide; 44th overall, 2008 Rookie: North Melbourne 54th overall, 2009 Rookie: North Melbourne
- Height: 192 cm (6 ft 4 in)
- Weight: 89 kg (196 lb)

Playing career^{1}
Years	Club	Games (Goals)
2006	Adelaide	0 (0)
2008–2009	North Melbourne	5 (0)
- ^{1} Playing statistics correct to the end of 2010.

Alan Obst is an Australian rules football player who played for North Melbourne in the Australian Football League (AFL) and Central District in the South Australian National Football League (SANFL).

Originally from the South Gawler Football Club, Obst played for South Australia at the 2005 AFL Under 18 Championships. Obst was then drafted by Adelaide with the 48th selection in the 2005 AFL draft but was delisted at the end of the 2006 AFL season without making his AFL debut. After playing for Central District in the SANFL in 2007, including in their 2007 SANFL Premiership side, he was selected by North Melbourne in the 2008 Rookie Draft.

Obst made his AFL debut in Round 8 of the 2008 AFL season, two days before his 21st birthday. He was badly injured from a collision during the game. He fractured ribs and suffered a collapsed lung, resulting in him being unable to fly home from the Gold Coast and instead was driven home. He returned later in the year to play two more games, but was delisted again at the end of the season. North Melbourne then re-selected him in the 2009 Rookie Draft. He only played in the final two matches of the 2009 AFL season and not at all in 2010, before he was delisted from an AFL club for the third time in October 2010.

In 2011 he returned to South Australia to again play for Central District.

Obst has twice suffered injuries from late-night incidents at bars, firstly in May 2010 in Melbourne and then in April 2011 in Adelaide, when he received a broken jaw.
