= Stephen Officer =

Australian rules footballer

Personal information
- Full name: Stephen John Officer
- Born: 18 August 1949 (age 77)
- Original team: South Gawler
- Height: 191 cm (6 ft 3 in)
- Weight: 83 kg (183 lb)

Playing career^{1}
| Years | Club | Games (Goals) |
| 1971–72, 1975 | South Melbourne | 24 (5) |
| 1975 | Brunswick (VFA) | 4 (4) |
- ^{1} Playing statistics correct to the end of 1975.

Stephen John Officer (born 18 August 1949) is a former Australian rules footballer who played with South Melbourne in the Victorian Football League (VFL).
