= Eastern Park Football Club =

Eastern Park

Names
- Full name: Eastern Park Football Club
- Nickname(s): 'Demons', 'Dees’

2025 season
- After finals: 4th
- Home-and-away season: 2nd
- Leading goalkicker: Chris Knapp (55 Goals)

Club details
- Founded: 1962; 64 years ago
- Colours
- Competition: Adelaide Footy League
- President: Damien Griffiths
- Coach: Lindsay Thomas
- Captain: Alex Clements
- Ground: Dwight Reserve

Uniforms
Home	Away

The Eastern Park Football Club is an Australian rules football club based in Elizabeth Park, South Australia that currently competes in Division 5, Division 5 Reserves, Division C5 & Women's Division 2 of the Adelaide Footy League while the junior teams currently compete in the SANFL Juniors competition. The club has a rivalry with the Smithfield Football Club and Elizabeth Football Club

== History ==
The Eastern Park Football Club was founded in 1962 and struggled to win a game until its first A-Grade victory over Elizabeth in its second season. 1964 was a year that the side made their first grand final but lost to Elizabeth North. They won their first of their four premierships in 1978 over Central United and three more followed in 1980, 1981 and 1987. The league they played in was renamed the Northern Metropolitan Football League in 1988 and that same year the Demons made the decider again but lost to Ovingham. Eastern Park played in the former Central Districts Football Association and competed in the A2 division. The Demons remained in the CDFA until the league disbanded in 1995 and saw the move to the SAAFL. The Demons made it to the 1994 grand final, the final decider of the NMFL but went down to Brahma Lodge.

The Demons started their SAAFL career in Division 6 and eventually reached Division 1 after a 2010 Division 2 premiership over PHOS Camden. The Demons enjoyed premiership successes in Division 6 and 5 flags in 1997 and 1998, Division 4 runners up in 1999 and 2002 and Division 3 runners up in 2008. In 2016, Eastern Park claimed the Division 4 minor premiership and reached the grand final but ultimately lost to the Westminster Old Scholars Football Club and the following year saw the end of their season in the preliminary final after losing to Morphettville Park.
