= Adelaide Plains Football League =

Australian rules football league

- Current season, competition or edition: 2023
- Sport: Australian rules football
- Founded: 1909
- Website: apfl.com.au

The Adelaide Plains Football League (APFL) is an Australian rules football competition based in the Adelaide Plains region which is immediately north of Adelaide, South Australia. It is an affiliated member of the South Australian National Football League.

== History ==
Grace Plains was possibly the first club formed in the District in 1904. Football was certainly played in the other towns of Mallala, Dublin and Two Wells at that time with those clubs all officially forming in 1908. When Virginia was formed in 1909, moves were being made to form an association from a group of clubs that had played an unofficial competition in 1908.

A meeting held in Dublin on 4 May 1909, resulted in the formation of the Adelaide Plains Football Association. Delegates were present from Mallala, Virginia, Two Wells, Windsor, Lower Light and Dublin. Officers elected were, patron Mr Coombe, president Mr George Cheney and secretary Mr Andrew Driscoll. At a second meeting the colours were chosen as double blue.

Dublin had a comfortable victory over Two Wells in the first match of the new association 9.14 (68) to 0.2 (2). Dublin had gone to a lot of trouble to ensure their facilities were adequate for their opening match of the season. In the preceding months they had built dressing rooms, a pavilion and had even erected new goal posts.

Mr Ron Murrell of Two Wells presented the Murrell Medal to the best and fairest footballer in Adelaide Plains football. This medal was the forerunner to the presenting of a Mail Medal. Jack Wallace of Long Plains was a dominant player in the early 1920s, winning two Murrell Medals and being runner up for a further two. Mallala provided the winner in 1921 with Walter Dunstan.

Wasleys Football Club created a record in 1927 when they became the first Adelaide Plains club to complete a season without losing a match. Hamley Bridge applied to join the association in 1930 but their application was rejected because of the poor condition of the roads over which visiting teams would have to travel to arrive at Hamley Bridge.

When the program of matches was drawn up for the 1935 season it was decided to begin on May 25th to allow farmers the chance to finish their seeding. It was also planned to take a week off when the South Australia vs Victoria state match was set down to be played at Adelaide Oval.

During the 1947 season, Balaklava and Long Plains played each other on four occasions. Their first meeting was early in the minor round at Balaklava, the scores were Balaklava 4.9 (33) drawing with Long Plains 5.3 (33). Their return match in June resulted in a narrow six point win to Balaklava 8.3 (51) to 5.15 (45). The next encounter was in the first semi final with the scores tied again Balaklava 5.2 (32) Long Plains 4.8 (32) and then the replayed semi final resulted in another draw 7.7 (49) each. Long Plains possessed more powerful staying qualities and eventually won the first semi final 10.11 (71) to 4.5 (29). Long Plains made it to the grand final but obviously ran out of steam losing to Wasleys by 8 points.

From the early 1960s, a Central Districts football carnival was held and sponsored by Caltex Oil. The leagues taking part were Adelaide Plains, North Eastern, North Western and Gawler and Districts. Mid North replaced North Western when that association closed after the 1963 season. The carnival was renamed the Mid North carnival in 1975, and Adelaide Plains dropped out of the format in 1998.

Adelaide Plains introduced a new import rule in 1998 where a boundary was placed around the competition with only those living within the limits able to play as locals. Depending on the size of their population base and where the finished the previous season, each club was assigned a designated allowance of 'outside' players.

During a history of just over 100 years, the Adelaide Plains association has outlasted many nearby associations. The Wooroora, Wakefield, North Western, Lower North and Gilbert associations have all fallen by the wayside with their member clubs or their incarnations filtering through to become the Adelaide Plains of today.

(From South Australian Country Football Digest - Peter Lines)

== Clubs ==
=== Locations ===
Locations of the Adelaide Plains FL clubs

=== Current ===
Club	Colours	Nickname	Home Ground	Former League	Est.	Years in APFL	APFL Senior Premierships	
Club	Colours	Nickname	Home Ground	Former League	Est.	Years in APFL	Total	Years
Angle Vale		Owls	Angle Vale Oval, Angle Vale	AdFL	1998	2016–	0	-
Balaklava		Peckers	Balaklava Oval, Balaklava	WFA	1903	1940–2019; 2021–	13	1951, 1957, 1958, 1977, 1983, 1985, 1986, 1991, 1994, 1996, 1999, 2000, 2011
Hamley Bridge		Bombers	Hamley Bridge Sports and Community Centre, Hamley Bridge	G&DFL	1899	1936–63, 1984–	9	1938, 1939, 1952, 1956, 1960, 1988, 1989, 2004, 2014
Hummocks Watchman Eagles		Eagles	Port Wakefield Oval, Port Wakefield and Lochiel Oval, Lochiel	–	1995	1995–2019; 2021–	6	2001, 2003, 2005, 2006, 2008, 2019
Mallala		Magpies	Mallala Oval, Mallala	–	1908	1904–	28	1912, 1913, 1914, 1915, 1919, 1920, 1921, 1923, 1924, 1925, 1953, 1955, 1959, 1962, 1963, 1970, 1974, 1978, 1979, 1990, 1997, 2007, 2009, 2010, 2013, 2016, 2020, 2025
Two Wells		Roosters	Two Wells Oval, Two Wells	G&DFL	c.1911	1909–27, 1932–38, 1987–	9	1987, 2012, 2017, 2018, 2021, 2022, 2023, 2024, 2026
United		Tigers	Long Plains Recreation Ground, Long Plains	–	1964	1964–	3	1982, 1995, 2002
Virginia		Rams	Virginia Sports Oval, Virginia	NMFL	1907	1909–13, 1919, 1995–	4	1909, 1910, 1998, 2015

== Former clubs ==
Club	Colours	Nickname	Home Ground	Former League	Est.	Years in APFL	APFL Senior Premierships		Fate
Club	Colours	Nickname	Home Ground	Former League	Est.	Years in APFL	Total	Years	Fate
Avon				WFA	1900s	1946-1947	0	-	Folded after 1947 season
Bute		Roosters	Bute Oval, Bute	YPFL	1892	2020	0	-	Returned to Yorke Peninsula FL in 2021
Dublin (1)			Dublin Oval, Dublin	–	1909	1909-1920	1	1911	Merged with Windsor and Wild Horse Plains to form United (Dublin 2) following 1920 season
Dublin (2) (United 1921-27)	(1921-27)(1928-49)(1954-63)	Tigers	Dublin Oval, Dublin	–	1921	1921-1949, 1954-1963	5	1922, 1928, 1931, 1932, 1933	Recess between 1950-53. Merged with Long Plains to form United in 1964
Grace Plains				–	1904	1915-1935	2	1926, 1930	Folded after 1935 season
Hummocks United		Bulldogs	Lochiel Oval, Lochiel and Nantawarra Oval, Nantawarra	–	1964	1964-1984	11	1964, 1965, 1966, 1969, 1971, 1972, 1973, 1975, 1976, 1980, 1981	Merged with Watchman Auburn to form Hummocks Watchman in 1985
Hummocks Watchman		Bulldogs	Lochiel Oval, Lochiel	–	1985	1985-1994	0	-	Merged with Port Wakefield to form Hummocks Watchman Eagles in 1995
Korunye (Lower Light 1905-19)			Lower Light Oval, Lower Light	LNFA	1908	1909-1915, 1919-1920, 1933-1934	0	-	Entered recess after 1920, re-formed in Lower North FA in 1925. Folded after 1934 season
Long Plains			Long Plains Recreation Ground, Long Plains	–	1910s	1920-1963	7	1940, 1945, 1946, 1948, 1949, 1950, 1954	Merged with Dublin to form United in 1964
Mundoora Wokurna		Hawks	Mundoora Oval, Mundoora	BFL	1966	1981-1983	0	-	Merged with Broughton to form Broughton-Mundoora in 1984
Owen		Roosters	Owen Oval, Owen	WFA	1905	1946-1973	0	-	Merged with Port Wakefield to form Port-Owen Hawks in 1974
Port-Owen Hawks		Hawks	Port Wakefield Oval, Port Wakefield	–	1974	1974-1976	0	-	De-merged into Port Wakefield and Owen in 1977
Port Wakefield		Eagles	Port Wakefield Oval, Port Wakefield	NWFA	1893	1964-1973, 1978-1995	2	1984, 1992	Merged with Owen to form Port-Owen Hawks in 1974. Merged with Hummocks Watchman to form Hummocks Watchman Eagles in 1995
RAAF Edinburgh			Mallala Oval, Mallala	–	1947	1947-1950	0	-	Folded after 1950 season
Roseworthy		Roosters	Oval opposite Leitch's Roseworthy Hotel, Roseworthy	G&DFL	1920s	1961	0	-	Returned to Gawler & District FL in 1962
Roseworthy College	(1980s)(?-1996)	Panthers	Roseworthy College Oval, Agricultural College, Roseworthy	G&DFL	1897	1961-1963, 1985-1996	0	-	Returned to Gawler & District FL in 1964. Absorbed by Adelaide University in 1997
South Gawler		Lions	South Gawler Oval, Evanston	G&DFL	1889	1961-1962	1	1961	Returned to Gawler & District FL after 1962 season
Two Wells Virginia				NMFL	1959	1970-1973	0	-	Moved to Gawler & District FL in 1974
Wasleys			Wasleys Oval, Wasleys	G&DFL	1901	1924-1963	7	1927, 1929, 1934, 1935, 1936, 1937, 1947	Returned to Gawler & District FL after 1963 season
Watchman			Hoyleton Oval, Hoyleton	NWFA	1921	1964-1974	2	1967, 1968	Merged with Auburn to form Watchman Auburn in 1975
Watchman Auburn		Wolves	Auburn Oval, Auburn	–	1975	1975-1984	0	-	Merged with Hummocks United form Hummocks Watchman in 1985
Wild Horse Plains			Wild Horse Plains Oval, Wild Horse Plains	–	1919	1919-1920	0	-	Merged with Dublin to form United (original) in 1921
Windsor				–	1908	1909-1915	0	-	Folded

== Premierships ==
Year	A Grade	Reserves	Senior Colts	Junior Colts
1909	Virginia			
1910	Virginia			
1911	Dublin			
1912	Mallala			
1913	Mallala			
1914	Mallala			
1915	Mallala			
1916-1918 - competition in recess due to WWI
1919	Mallala			
1920	Mallala			
1921	Mallala			
1922	United (original)			
1923	Mallala			
1924	Mallala			
1925	Mallala			
1926	Grace Plains			
1927	Wasleys			
1928	Dublin			
1929	Wasleys			
1930	Grace Plains			
1931	Dublin			
1932	Dublin			
1933	Dublin			
1934	Wasleys			
1935	Wasleys			
1936	Wasleys			
1937	Wasleys			
1938	Hamley Bridge			
1939	Hamley Bridge			
1940	Long Plains			
1941-1944 - competition in recess due to WWII
1945	Long Plains			
1946	Long Plains			
1947	Wasleys			
1948	Long Plains			
1949	Long Plains			
1950	Long Plains			
1951	Balaklava			
1952	Hamley Bridge			
1953	Mallala			
1954	Long Plains			
1955	Mallala			
1956	Hamley Bridge			
1957	Balaklava			
1958	Balaklava	Owen		
1959	Mallala	Balaklava		
1960	Hamley Bridge	Hamley Bridge		
1961	Gawler South	Gawler South		
1962	Mallala	Gawler South		
1963	Mallala	Balaklava		
1964	Hummocks United	Balaklava		
1965	Hummocks United	Mallala		
1966	Hummocks United	Mallala	United	
1967	Watchman	Mallala	Owen	
1968	Watchman	Balaklava	Mallala	
1969	Hummocks United	Mallala	United	
1970	Mallala	Two Wells-Virginia	Two Wells-Virginia	Two Wells-Virginia
1971	Hummocks United	Mallala	Balaklava	Mallala
1972	Hummocks United	Balaklava	Two Wells-Virginia	Balaklava
1973	Hummocks United	Mallala	Mallala	Two Wells-Virginia
1974	Mallala	Hummocks United	Mallala	Balaklava
1975	Hummocks United	Balaklava	Watchman-Auburn	Mallala
1976	Hummocks United	Pt Owen Hawks	Watchman-Auburn	Balaklava
1977	Balaklava	Hummocks	Balaklava	Balaklava
1978	Mallala	Watchman-Auburn	Balaklava	Balaklava
1979	Mallala	Balaklava	Mallala	Balaklava
1980	Hummocks United	Balaklava	Balaklava	United
1981	Hummocks United	Balaklava	Balaklava	Balaklava
1982	United	Balaklava	Balaklava	Balaklava
1983	Balaklava	Balaklava	Mallala	Balaklava
1984	Port Wakefield	Balaklava	Balaklava	United
1985	Balaklava	Hamley Bridge	United	United
1986	Balaklava	Balaklava	United	Balaklava
1987	Two Wells	Hamley Bridge	Two Wells	United
1988	Hamley Bridge	United	Two Wells	Hummocks-Watchman
1989	Hamley Bridge	Mallala	Two Wells	Hummocks-Watchman
1990	Mallala	Two Wells	Two Wells	Hummocks-Watchman
1991	Balaklava	Mallala	Balaklava	Mallala
1992	Port Wakefield	Two Wells	Hummocks-Watchman	United
1993	Mallala	Mallala	Hamley Bridge	Balaklava
1994	Balaklava	Two Wells	Mallala	Two Wells
1995	United	Mallala	HW Eagles	HW Eagles
1996	Balaklava	Virginia	HW Eagles	Mallala
1997	Mallala	Mallala	Balaklava	Virginia
1998	Virginia	Balaklava	Virginia	Virginia
1999	Balaklava	United	HW Eagles	Two Wells
2000	Balaklava	Hamley Bridge	Virginia	Mallala
2001	HW Eagles	HW Eagles	Two Wells	Hamley Bridge
2002	United	Two Wells	Two Wells	Two Wells
2003	HW Eagles	Virginia	Mallala	Two Wells
2004	Hamley Bridge	Virginia	Two Wells	Two Wells
2005	HW Eagles	United	Two Wells	United
2006	HW Eagles	Virginia	Mallala	Balaklava
2007	Mallala	United	United	Balaklava
2008	HW Eagles	Hamley Bridge	Two Wells	Balaklava
2009	Mallala	Two Wells	Balaklava	Two Wells
2010	Mallala	Mallala	Balaklava	Two Wells
2011	Balaklava	Balaklava	Two Wells	Mallala
2012	Two Wells	Virginia	Two Wells	Balaklava
2013	Mallala	United	Two Wells	Mallala
2014	Hamley Bridge	Two Wells	Mallala	Balaklava
2015	Virginia	Virginia	Mallala	Balaklava
2016	Mallala	Virginia	Mallala	Two Wells
2017	Two Wells	Virginia	Angle Vale	Two Wells
2018	Two Wells	Mallala	Two Wells	Virginia
2019	HW Eagles	Two Wells	Two Wells	Angle Vale
2020	Mallala	Two Wells	Mallala	two wells
2021	Two Wells	Mallala	Virginia	Angle Vale
2022	Two Wells	Balaklava	Angle Vale	Angle Vale
2023	Two Wells	Balaklava	Angle Vale	Angle Vale
2024	Two Wells	Mallala	Two Wells	Angle Vale
2025	Mallala	Two Wells	Angle Vale	Virginia
2026	Two Wells	Two Wells	Mallala	Angle Vale

== 2009 Ladder ==
Adelaide Plains	Wins	Byes	Losses	Draws	For	Against	%	Pts	Final	Team	G	B	Pts	Team	G	B	Pts
Mallala	13	0	3	0	1541	758	67.03%	26	1st Semi	Two Wells	14	14	98	Hummocks-Watchman	6	13	49
Virginia	12	0	4	0	1227	892	57.90%	24	2nd Semi	Mallala	11	14	80	Virginia	9	9	63
Two Wells	10	0	6	0	1679	1350	55.43%	20	Preliminary	Two Wells	18	18	126	Virginia	10	11	71
Hummocks-Watchman	8	0	8	0	1485	1297	53.38%	16	Grand	Mallala	16	7	103	Two Wells	9	10	64
United	7	0	9	0	1340	1234	52.06%	14									
Balaklava	6	0	10	0	1250	1287	49.27%	12									
Hamley Bridge	0	0	16	0	799	2503	24.20%	0									

== 2010 Ladder ==
Adelaide Plains	Wins	Byes	Losses	Draws	For	Against	%	Pts	Final	Team	G	B	Pts	Team	G	B	Pts
Mallala	13	0	3	0	1274	922	58.01%	26	1st Semi	Virginia	7	7	49	Balaklava	3	9	27
Hummocks-Watchman	11	0	5	0	1442	1029	58.36%	22	2nd Semi	Mallala	2	2	14	Hummocks-Watchman	1	5	11
Balaklava	11	0	5	0	1429	1100	56.50%	22	Preliminary	Virginia	8	11	59	Hummocks-Watchman	2	10	22
Virginia	10	0	6	0	1551	1176	56.88%	20	Grand	Mallala	6	15	51	Virginia	7	8	50
Two Wells	7	0	9	0	1306	1312	49.89%	14									
United	3	0	13	0	897	1329	40.30%	6									
Hamley Bridge	1	0	15	0	967	1998	32.61%	2									

== 2011 Ladder ==
Adelaide Plains	Wins	Byes	Losses	Draws	For	Against	%	Pts	Final	Team	G	B	Pts	Team	G	B	Pts
Balaklava	13	0	3	0	1845	1017	64.47%	26	1st Semi	Mallala	10	16	76	United	7	10	52
Virginia	13	0	3	0	1645	1079	60.39%	26	2nd Semi	Balaklava	16	22	118	Virginia	11	11	77
Mallala	10	0	6	0	1209	1024	54.14%	20	Preliminary	Virginia	11	9	75	Mallala	10	11	71
United	8	0	8	0	1198	1263	48.68%	16	Grand	Balaklava	15	15	105	Virginia	9	4	58
Hummocks-Watchman	6	0	10	0	1040	1386	42.87%	12									
Two Wells	3	0	13	0	1044	1452	41.83%	6									
Hamley Bridge	3	0	13	0	988	1748	36.11%	6									

== 2012 Ladder ==
Adelaide Plains	Wins	Byes	Losses	Draws	For	Against	%	Pts	Final	Team	G	B	Pts	Team	G	B	Pts
Balaklava	13	0	3	0	1707	968	63.81%	26	1st Semi	Virginia	13	16	94	Mallala	10	13	73
Two Wells	12	0	4	0	1975	895	68.82%	24	2nd Semi	Two Wells	17	10	112	Balaklava	11	14	80
Mallala	11	0	5	0	1448	988	59.44%	22	Preliminary	Virginia	12	7	79	Balaklava	10	13	73
Virginia	11	0	5	0	1499	1200	55.54%	22	Grand	Two Wells	15	7	97	Virginia	11	11	77
Hamley Bridge	3	0	12	1	1198	1984	37.65%	7									
United	3	0	12	1	925	1708	35.13%	7									
Hummocks-Watchman	2	0	14	0	739	1748	29.71%	4									

== 2013 Ladder ==
Adelaide Plains	Wins	Byes	Losses	Draws	For	Against	%	Pts	Final	Team	G	B	Pts	Team	G	B	Pts
Mallala	14	0	2	0	1626	841	65.91%	28	1st Semi	Two Wells	20	18	138	Virginia	13	7	85
Hamley Bridge	12	0	4	0	1422	1227	53.68%	24	2nd Semi	Mallala	13	18	96	Hamley Bridge	8	9	57
Two Wells	10	0	6	0	1480	1088	57.63%	20	Preliminary	Two Wells	18	12	120	Hamley Bridge	6	7	43
Virginia	9	0	7	0	1623	1353	54.54%	18	Grand	Mallala	10	11	71	Two Wells	6	9	45
Balaklava	6	0	10	0	1154	1400	45.18%	12									
United	3	0	13	0	1137	1614	41.33%	6									
Hummocks-Watchman	2	0	14	0	930	1849	33.47%	4									

== 2014 Ladder ==
Adelaide Plains	Wins	Byes	Losses	Draws	For	Against	%	Pts	Final	Team	G	B	Pts	Team	G	B	Pts
Hamley Bridge	12	0	4	0	2018	1181	63.08%	24	1st Semi	Balaklava	16	6	102	Virginia	13	13	91
Mallala	11	0	4	1	1559	1131	57.96%	23	2nd Semi	Hamley Bridge	17	12	114	Mallala	17	9	111
Virginia	10	0	6	0	1910	1189	61.63%	20	Preliminary	Mallala	12	10	82	Balaklava	6	8	44
Balaklava	9	0	7	0	1239	1326	48.30%	18	Grand	Hamley Bridge	16	13	109	Mallala	17	5	107
Two Wells	8	0	8	0	1576	1272	55.34%	16									
United	5	0	10	1	1221	1472	45.34%	11									
Hummocks-Watchman	0	0	16	0	639	2591	19.78%	0									

== Bibliography ==
- Encyclopedia of South Australian country football clubs compiled by Peter Lines. ISBN 9780980447293
- South Australian country football digest by Peter Lines ISBN 9780987159199
