= Salisbury Football Club =

Salisbury

Names
- Full name: Salisbury Football Club
- Nickname: The Magpies
- Motto: Proud of the past, confident of the future.
- Club song: "Cheer boys cheer, we are the Salisburyites"

2023 season
- After finals: DNQ
- Home-and-away season: 6th

Club details
- Founded: 1880; 146 years ago
- Colours: Black white
- Competition: Adelaide Footy League
- President: Grant De Bais
- Chairperson: Kym Finlay-Smith
- Coach: Brett Joseph
- Captain: Aeddan Hull
- Ground: Salisbury Oval, Salisbury

Uniforms
Home

Other information
- Official website: salisburyfc.com.au

The Salisbury Football Club, nicknamed the Magpies, is an Australian rules football club based in the northern suburb of Salisbury, South Australia and plays its home games at Salisbury Oval.

== History ==
The history of football being played in the Salisbury area can date back to the 1870 with a record between a match between two teams from Gawler and a combined team between players from the suburbs of Salisbury and Woodville. The first recorded official match between the Salisbury team and an opponent was on 30 July 1880 against Gawler Albions. Sustaining a secure home ground was quite difficult for Salisbury as drainage and finding suitable grounds were hard problems to come by. The first guernseys for the Salisbury Football Club were made of old wheat sacks with black stripes sewn on.

The first reported game for Salisbury in 1890 was on played at Salisbury on Saturday, 10 May, against South Gawler. It was reported the visiting team after a pleasant run down in Mr.Baker's five-horse coach reached Salisbury about 3.30 pm, and the game soon started but both teams were short handed especially the home team. This also being the Salisbury's first game they were somewhat out of practise, but nevertheless played a plucky game and that the club has now got a splendid ground. The final scores were South Gawlers, 7 goals 8 behinds defeated Salisbury, 2 behinds.

On March 2, 1911, The annual meeting of Salisbury Football Club was held in the institute, and the following officers were elected: Patron, Dr. W. A. Hunter; president, Mr. E. Tate; captain, H. J. White; vice-captain, A. W. Griffiths; general committee, president, captain, vice-captain, secretary, J. Opie, and E. Judd; selection committee, captain, vice-captain, and H. Coker. It was resolved that the Salisbury club would join the Gawler Association this year if accepted.

In 1911 Salisbury joined The Gawler Football Association which was founded in 1889 by then Junior Clubs South Gawler, Gawler Central and Willaston when Gawler Football Club had a senior team in the SAFA (now SANFL). Salisbury won the 1914 minor premiership but lost the grand final to Gawler Central 9.6.60 to 4.7.31. A pavilion was built the year before in 1913 at their new home ground of Salisbury Oval with the help of a local gymnasium club. The 1920s saw a rather unsuccessful era for Salisbury, losing four grand finals to Gawler South.

In 1926, following the club's withdrawal from the Gawler Association it moved to the North Adelaide District Football Association from 1926 to 1928, where it was runner up in 1926 to Gaza and 1927 to Prospect and eliminated from the final four by Walkerville in 1928, before rejoining Gawler Association in 1929.

In 1937 Salisbury joined the Lower North Association with Angle Vale, One Tree Hill, Smithfield and Virginia until World War II. The club gained its first premiership success by beating Virginia in the 1937 grand final at Smithfield. During the war, the club still remained active.

Post War World 2 in 1949 Salisbury again joined the Gawler Association competition, which was renamed in 1953 to the Gawler & District Football League and left in 1960, where it enjoyed more premiership success in 1956 and 1957, both against Gawler South who had changed their name to South Gawler and the club adopting the 'Magpies' nickname and wearing the current Collingwood jumper. There was a rather large emphasis on junior football too for the club, and so, the Salisbury Junior Football Club was founded.

1961 was their first season in the newly formed Central Districts Football Association along with Central District, Elizabeth, Elizabeth North, Salisbury North and Two Wells-Virginia. The club won four premierships in a row from 1968 to 1971, with a centenary celebrated in 1980 and the A-Grade team making the decider but unfortunately losing. The name of the league changed to the Northern Metropolitan Football League in the 1980s, along with 1984, 1986 and 1988 senior flags.

The NMFL disbanded in 1994 and Salisbury moved to the South Australian Amateur Football League renamed Adelaide Footy League in 2017 where it has remained since. The Magpies have won recent premierships in 1997, 2001 and 2007 and celebrated its 130-year anniversary in 2010. The B-Grade side were back to back premiers in 2016 and the U18s won the same year. Salisbury has also produced a number of Australian Football League players and one AFL Women's player, Stuart Dew (Port Adelaide, Hawthorn), Anthony Ingerson (Adelaide, Melbourne), Scott Bamford (Geelong), Ben Nason (Richmond), Sean Lemmens (Gold Coast Suns) and Sarah Allen (Adelaide).

== A-Grade Premierships ==
- Lower North Football Association (1): 1937
  (11 September 1937 - Grand Final Salisbury 13.11 defeated Virginia 7.8 at Smithfield Oval)
- Gawler & District Football League (2): 1956, 1957
- Central Districts FA (4): 1968, 1969, 1970, 1971
- Northern Metropolitan FL (3): 1984, 1986, 1988
- South Australian Amateur FL - A7 (2): 1997
- South Australian Amateur Football League - A6 (1): 2001
- Adelaide FL - D4 (1): 2007

== Other information ==
- Official website
