= Standard Messenger =

Australian Newspaper

- Type: Weekly suburban newspaper
- Format: Tabloid
- Owner: Messenger Newspapers (News Limited)
- Editor: Megan Lloyd
- Staff writers: Kasia Ozog
- Founded: 1959; 67 years ago
- Headquarters: 25 Wiltshire St, Salisbury, SA, Australia
- Website: www.messengernorth.com.au

Standard Messenger is a weekly suburban newspaper in Adelaide, part of the Messenger Newspapers group. The Standard's area covers the inner-north of Adelaide's metropolitan area, from Collinswood in the south to Gepps Cross in the north.

The newspaper generally reports on events of interest in its distribution area, including the suburbs of Kilburn, Prospect, Hillcrest and Klemzig. It also covers the City of Prospect, Town of Walkerville and the City of Port Adelaide Enfield councils.

It has a circulation of 34,565 and a readership of 73,000.

== History ==
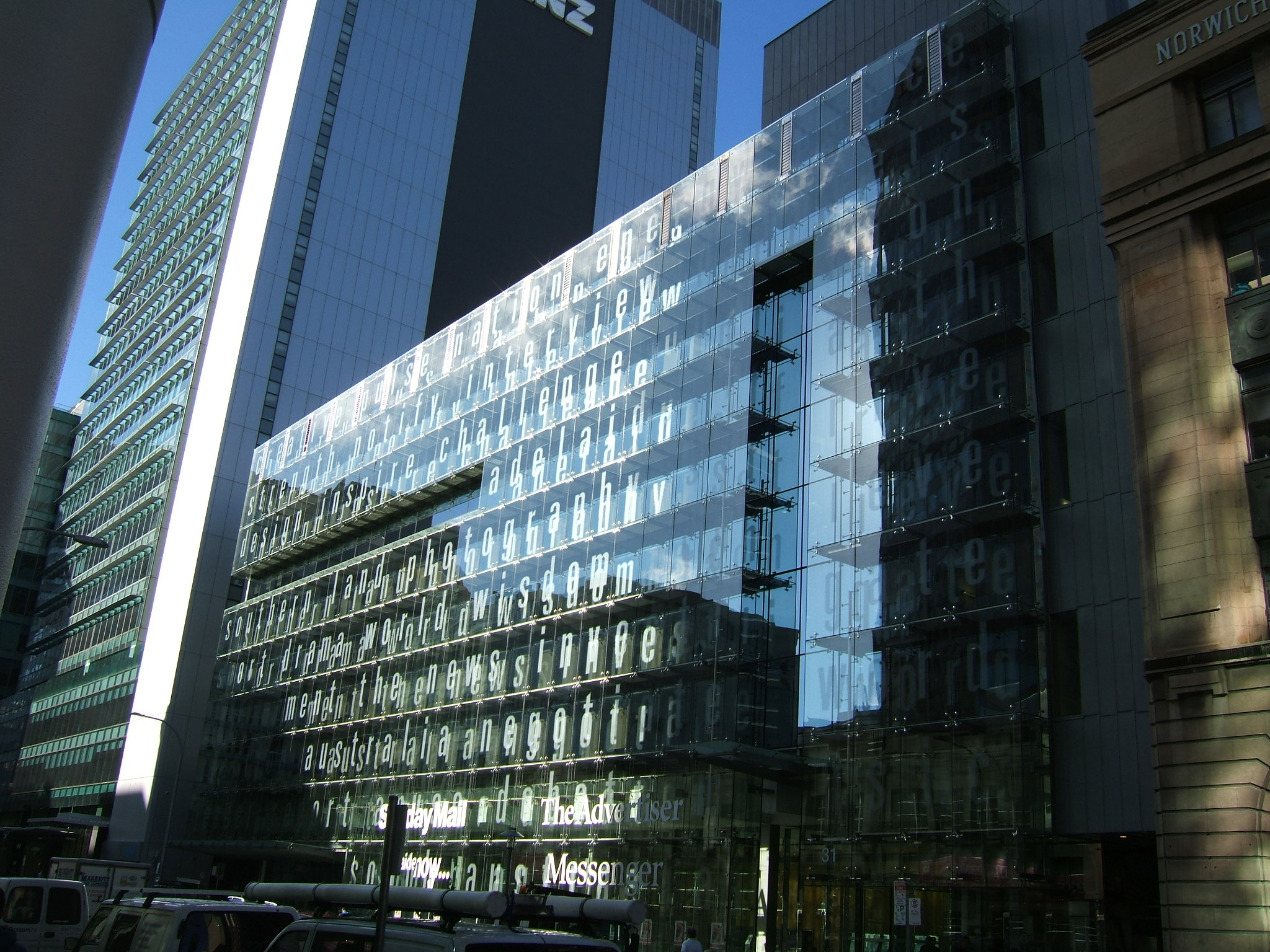
The office of the Messenger group of newspapers in Waymouth St, Adelaide

The Standard joined the Messenger group in 1959 and was renamed the Standard Messenger in 1984.
