= 1933 Barossa state by-election =

South Australian state by-election

The 1933 Barossa state by-election was a by-election held on 8 July 1933 for the South Australian House of Assembly seat of Barossa. The by-election was caused by the death on 4 June 1933 of independent MP Dr Herbert Basedow, who had regained the seat at the 1933 election less than two months prior. He had previously held the seat from 1927 to 1930.

The seat was contested by four candidates: solicitor Reginald Rudall for the governing Liberal and Country League, former MP Thomas Edwards, who listed his occupation as "out of business", for the Parliamentary Labor Party, labourer Leslie McMullin for the Labor Party, and farmer Lindsay Yelland as an independent. All four candidates had contested Barossa at the 1933 election. The by-election was held, as with the 1933 election, in the aftermath of the 1932 Labor split, in which the state Labor Party had split into three separate and competing parties. Edwards had been an incumbent at the time of the split, and had followed the Cabinet into the separate Parliamentary Labor Party when they were expelled over their response to the Great Depression, before his defeat by Basedow in 1933. A rumoured candidate from the third Labor splinter, the Lang Labor Party, did not emerge.

The largest booths were at Gawler (987 votes), Tanunda (774 votes), Gawler South (685 votes), Salisbury (326 votes), Angaston (375 votes) and Willaston (322 votes). There were also booths at Abattoirs, Blanchetown, Cockatoo Valley, Dublin, Enfield, Gawler Blocks, Gaza, Keyneton, Lights Pass, Loos, Long Plains, Lyndoch, Mallala, Mount McKenzie, Moculta, Northfield, Nuriootpa, Onetree Hill, Punyelroo, Red Banks, Rosedale, Roseworthy, Rowlands Flat, Sandleton, Sedan, Smithfield, St Kilda, Stockwell, Stonefield, Towitta, Truro, Two Wells, Virginia, Wasleys, Wild Horse Plains, Williamstown and Windsor.

The election campaign was described by the Bunyip newspaper as "quiet in character". Seats in the multi-member Barossa electorate had changed control several times over the previous decade; The Advertiser noted that Barossa "had never been a safe district for any party". A number of prominent figures featured in the campaign: Premier Richard Layton Butler, Minister of Agriculture Percy Blesing and Attorney-General Shirley Jeffries campaigned for Rudall, official Labor leader Andrew Lacey campaigned for McMullin, and Parliamentary Labor leader Robert Richards for Edwards.

The by-election was resoundingly won by Rudall, who polled 48% of the primary vote. Edwards and McMullin recorded small improvements from their general election vote in the absence of competing candidates from their respective parties, while independent candidate Yelland improved his vote significantly. Rudall won an overwhelming majority of booths, including Labor-leaning Gawler; Edwards topped the vote in Cockatoo Valley, Mt McKenzie, Tanunda, Willaston and Williamstown, McMullin in Blanchetown, Enfield and Gawler South, and Yelland in Abattoirs and Gaza. Many commentators in the aftermath of the by-election highlighted the ongoing political impact of the Labor split. Rudall continued as an MP until 1955, serving in both houses of parliament, and becoming a long-serving minister in the government of Thomas Playford IV.

== Results ==
Barossa state by-election, 8 July 1933
Party	Candidate	Votes	%	±%
Liberal and Country	Reginald Rudall	3,518	48.0	+45.9
Parliamentary Labor	Thomas Edwards	1,911	26.1	+3.6
Labor	Leslie McMullin	965	13.2	+0.5
Independent	Lindsay Yelland	935	12.8	+12.1
Total formal votes		7,329	98.1	+3.2
Informal votes		140	1.9	−3.2
Turnout		7,469	52.9	−13.7
Liberal and Country gain from Independent		Swing	N/A	

== See also ==
- List of South Australian state by-elections
