= Hundred of Bagot (South Australia) =

Bagot South Australia
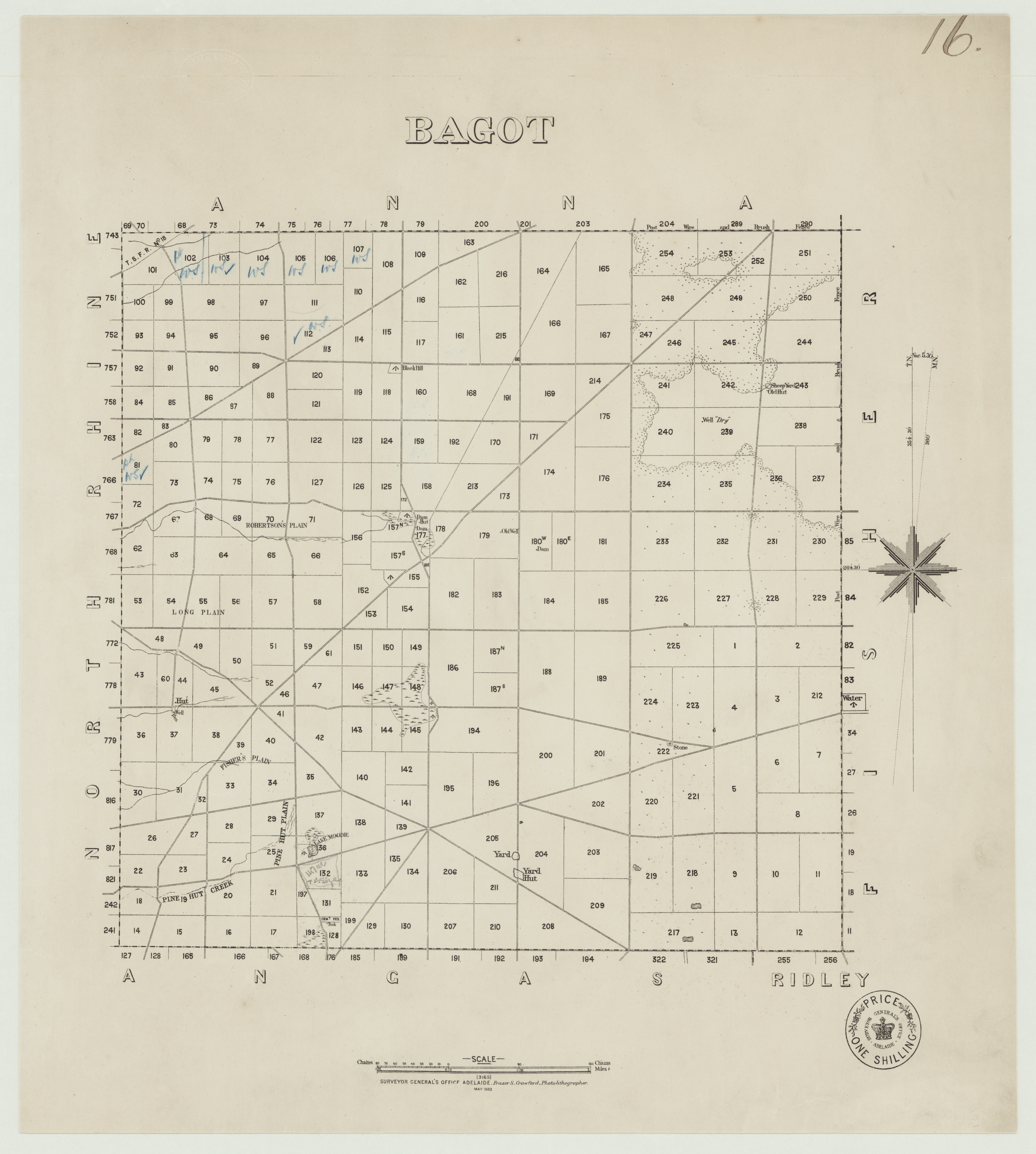
- 1883 cadastral map showing section numbers in the Hundred of Bagot

- Coordinates: 34.5°S 139.3°E
- Established: 1860
- LGA(s): Mid Murray Council
- County: County of Eyre
Lands administrative divisions around Bagot:
Jellicoe	Anna	Skurray
Jellicoe	Bagot	Fisher
Jutland	Angas	Ridley

The Hundred of Bagot is a cadastral hundred in the County of Eyre in South Australia. It is located between the Mount Lofty Ranges on the west and the Murray River further to the east. The Hundred of Bagot is almost exactly spans the boundaries of the contemporary town of Sedan.

== History ==
The Hundred of Bagot was proclaimed in 1860 by Governor Richard Graves MacDonnell. It is named after Charles Hervey Bagot, MLC. In November 1873, the District Council of North Rhine was established, bringing local governance to the hundred and much of its westerly neighbour the Hundred of North Rhine.

In 1918 many South Australian place "names of enemy origin" were changed to sound less German and the North Rhine council, like the hundred it governed, had its name changed. North Rhine council became Keyneton council, reflecting its population centre at Keyneton, and the hundred was renamed 'Jellicoe'.

In September 1933 the District Council of Swan Reach amalgamated with Keyneton to become new District Council of Keyneton and Swan Reach, bringing the hundred under local administration of that body. In the 1950s the council name was changed to 'Sedan', after the township of Sedan, which lay at the approximate centre of the council area.

In 1976 the Sedan council was abolished and the area came to be a part of the District Council of Ridley. In 1991 Ridley amalgamated with Truro council to the north. In 1997 Ridley-Truro amalgamated with Mannum council to the south and Morgan council to the north as well as part of Mount Pleasant council to the west to form the much larger Mid Murray Council.

== See also ==
- Lands administrative divisions of South Australia
