= District Council of Morgan =

District Council of Morgan South Australia
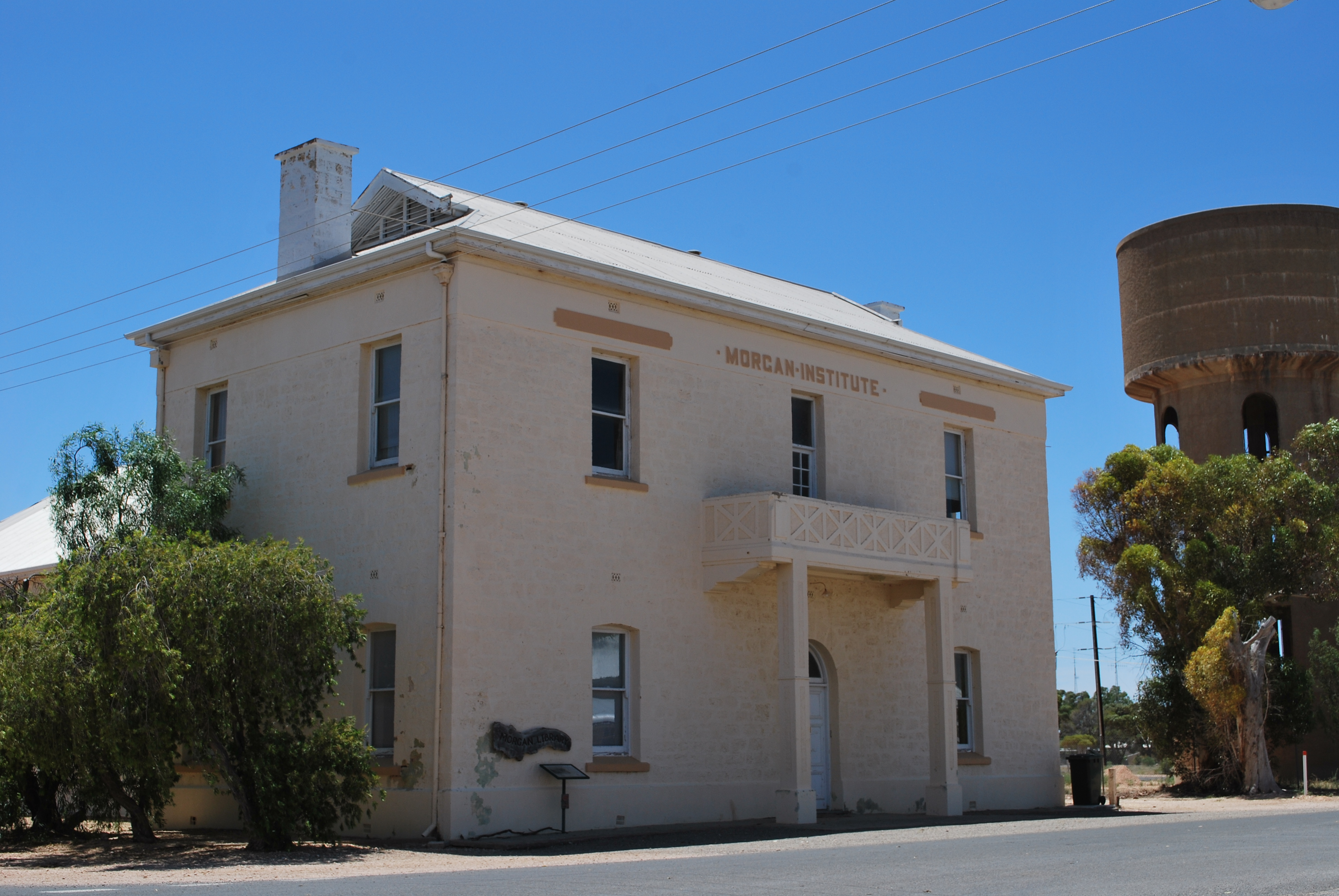
- Morgan Institute

- Coordinates: 34.03314481°S 139.66904468°E
- Established: 5 January 1888
- Abolished: 1 July 1997
- Council seat: Morgan
LGAs around District Council of Morgan:
Burra (1888–1935); Burra Burra (1935–1997)
Apoinga (1888–1932); English (1888–1932); Robertstown (1932–1997); Neales (1888–1932); Eudunda (1932–1997)	Morgan	Waikerie (1914–1997)
Truro (1888–1991); Ridley-Truro (1991–1997)	Swan Reach (1888–1933); Sedan (1933–1976); Ridley (1976–1991); Ridley-Truro (1991–1997)	Swan Reach (1888–1898); Waikerie (1914–1997)

The District Council of Morgan was a local government area in South Australia from 1888 to 1997, centring on the town of Morgan.

The council was established on 5 January 1888 following the passage of the District Councils Act 1887. It comprised the cadastral hundreds of Brownlow, Cadell, Eba, Hay, Krichauff (later renamed Beatty), Lindley, Schomburgk (later renamed Maude) and Stuart. It had nine councillors at its inception, appointed by the Governor, and held its first meeting at the Terminus Hotel at Morgan. The first elections were held in June and July 1888. It was subdivided into four wards of two councillors each on 11 August 1892: No. 1 (Morgan township and suburban areas), No. 2 (Eba, Krichauff and Cadell), No. 3 (Stuart, Lindley and Schomburgk) and No. 4 (Hay and Brownlow). A permanent council chamber was built in Fourth Street, Morgan in 1894. On 30 July 1902, the Hundred of Brownlow was severed from Morgan and added to the District Council of Neales as its Brownlow Ward, while the remainder of No. 4 Ward continued as-is.

The original council chamber burnt down in 1917, resulting in the destruction of all early council records. A new council chamber was built in 1918. In 1923, the total area under its control was 553,440 acres, with a ratable capital value of £175,600. It included 241 areas of parklands, an oval and a square, with the total length of roading being 30 miles. A fifth ward was gazetted in 1925 to cover the influx of soldier settlers to the Cadell Irrigation Area. In the 1960s, there was a boundary dispute between the Morgan council and the District Council of Waikerie over the previously unincorporated Hundreds of Markaranka and Pooginook: they were added to Waikerie as the new Taylorville Ward on 4 July 1960, severed and attached to Morgan on 18 April 1963, but returned to Waikerie on 1 July 1965 following further controversy.

In 1986, the district primarily served as a service centre for the surrounding pastoral and irrigation areas and as a tourist attraction, both for Morgan's heritage and for the Murray River itself. It covered an area of 2,151 square kilometres, and had a population of approximately 1,300 as of the 1981 census, chiefly of British or European background. Alongside the main township of Morgan, it also included the smaller townships of Cadell and Mount Mary. The primary industries of the district were wool production and fruitgrowing, with tourism, the Highways Dockyard for ferry maintenance, the Morgan–Whyalla pipeline pumping station and the Cadell Training Centre being sources of secondary industry. The council was involved in the provision of camping and caravan facilities, and at that time, in the absence of any regular public transport also provided a community bus to connect to the nearest Adelaide service at Blanchetown.

It ceased to exist on 1 July 1997, when it amalgamated with the District Council of Mannum, the District Council of Ridley-Truro and part of the District Council of Mount Pleasant to form the Mid Murray Council.

== Chairmen ==
- John Symons (1888–1890)
- James Bennett Gibbs (1893)
- Mostyn Andrew Young (1935–1937)
- Samuel Roy Morphett (1937–1940)
- Thomas Lindsay Bettison (1940–1948)
- Henry Edward Boord (1948–1978)
- Edwin Arthur Zerner (1978–1982)
- John Theodore Lindner (1982–?)
