= County of Eyre =

Eyre South Australia
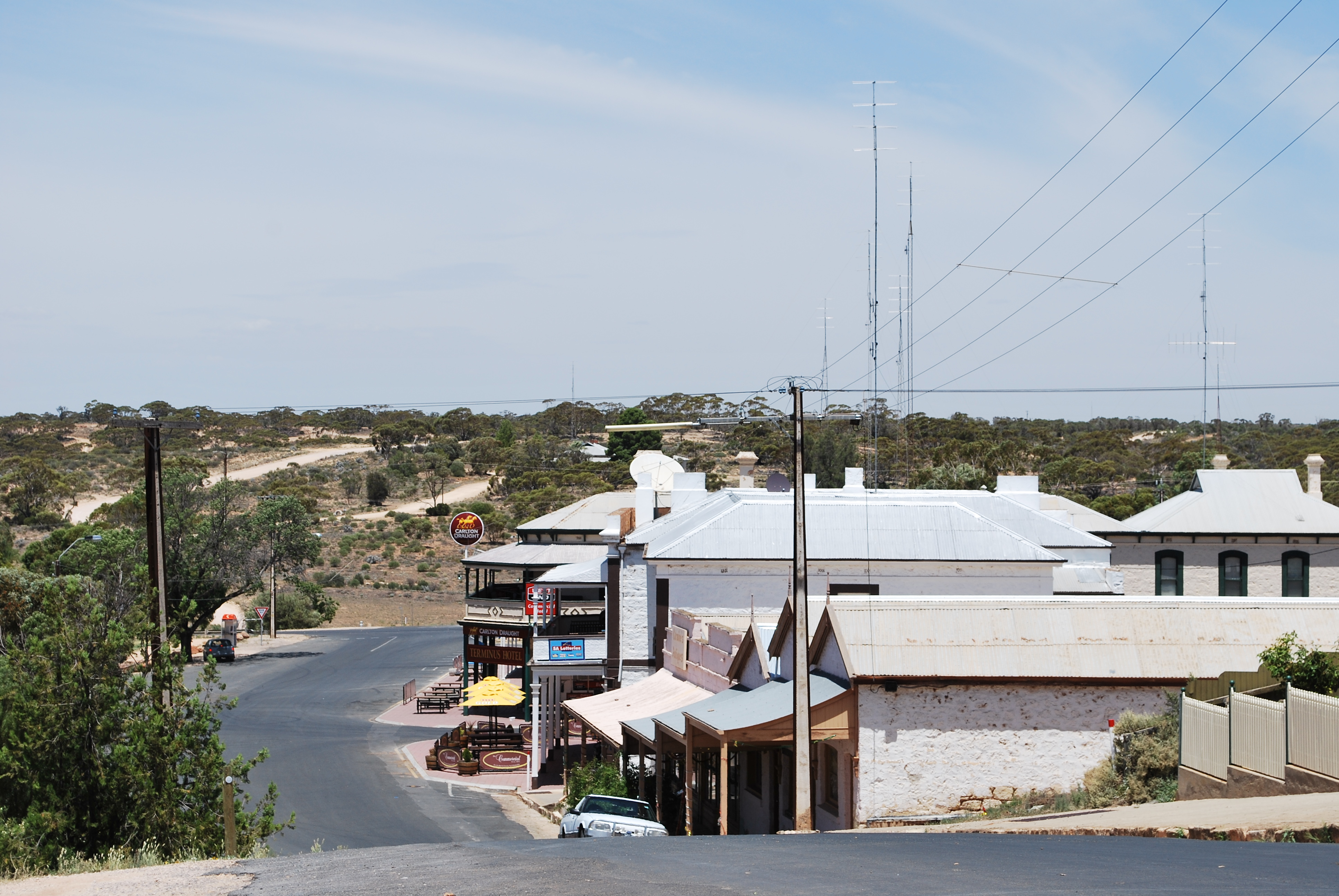
- Main street of Morgan on the west bank of the Murray River in the Hundred of Eba

- Coordinates: 34.26°S 139.35°E
- Established: 1842
Lands administrative divisions around Eyre:
Stanley	Burra	Young
Light	Eyre	Albert
Adelaide	Sturt	Albert

The County of Eyre is one of the 49 cadastral counties of South Australia. It was proclaimed by Governor George Grey in 1842 and named for the explorer Edward John Eyre. It covers a portion of the state between the Adelaide Hills in the west and the Murray River in the east from Robertstown and Mannum on the northern boundary to Sedan and Swan Reach on the southern boundary.

== Hundreds ==
The County of Eyre is divided into the following 13 hundreds:

- Hundred of English (Robertstown, Point Pass, Australia Plains, Rocky Plain)
- Hundred of Bower (Bower, Geranium Plains)
- Hundred of Beatty (Beatty, Mount Mary)
- Hundred of Eba (Eba, Morgan)
- Hundred of Neales (Eudunda, Neales Flat, Peep Hill, Sutherlands)
- Hundred of Brownlow (Brownlow)
- Hundred of Hay (McBean Pound)
- Hundred of Dutton (Dutton, Frankton, Dutton East)
- Hundred of Anna (Annadale, Steinfeld, Sandleton)
- Hundred of Skurray (Blanchetown)
- Hundred of Jellicoe (Truro, Keyneton, Towitta)
- Hundred of Bagot (South Australia) (Sedan)
- Hundred of Fisher (Fisher, Punyelroo)
