= Hundred of Anna =

Anna
- Cadastral division
- Coordinates: 34.4°S 139.4°E
- Country: Australia
- State: South Australia
- LGA(s): Mid Murray Council
- Established: 19 April 1860

Area
  - Total: 280 km^{2} (108 sq mi)
- County: Eyre
Lands administrative divisions around Anna
Dutton	Brownlow	Hay
Dutton; Jellicoe	Anna	Skurray
Jellicoe	Bagot	Fisher

The Hundred of Anna is a cadastral unit of hundred in South Australia. It contains all or most of the localities of Steinfeld, Annadale and Sandleton as well as small parts of the localities of Dutton East, Truro and Sedan. It is one of the 16 hundreds of the County of Eyre.

The hundred was named in 1860 by Governor Richard Graves MacDonnell after a daughter of James Chambers, who had funded four of John McDouall Stuart's expeditions. It is located on the plains between the Mount Lofty Ranges and the Murray River and is bisected by the Sturt Highway.
