= District Council of Ridley-Truro =

Coordinates: 34°39′0″S 139°17′0″E

the seat of the former District Council of Ridley-Truro

The District Council of Ridley-Truro was a local government area in South Australia from 1991 to 1997.

It commenced on 1 October 1991 following the amalgamation of the District Council of Ridley and the District Council of Truro. It comprised the whole of the cadastral Hundreds of Angas, Anna, Bagot, Forster, Fisher, Jellicoe, Nildottie, Ridley, Skurray, and parts of the Hundreds of Dutton and Bowhill. It had sixteen councillors at its inception, with two councillors representing each of the eight wards of the former municipalities. The council's seat was located in the town of Cambrai.

In 1996, the council was investigated by anti-corruption police after a ratepayers' meeting passed a vote of no-confidence in them.

It ceased to exist on 1 July 1997, when it amalgamated with the District Council of Mannum, the District Council of Morgan and part of the District Council of Mount Pleasant to form the Mid Murray Council.
