= District Council of Sedan =

District Council of Sedan South Australia
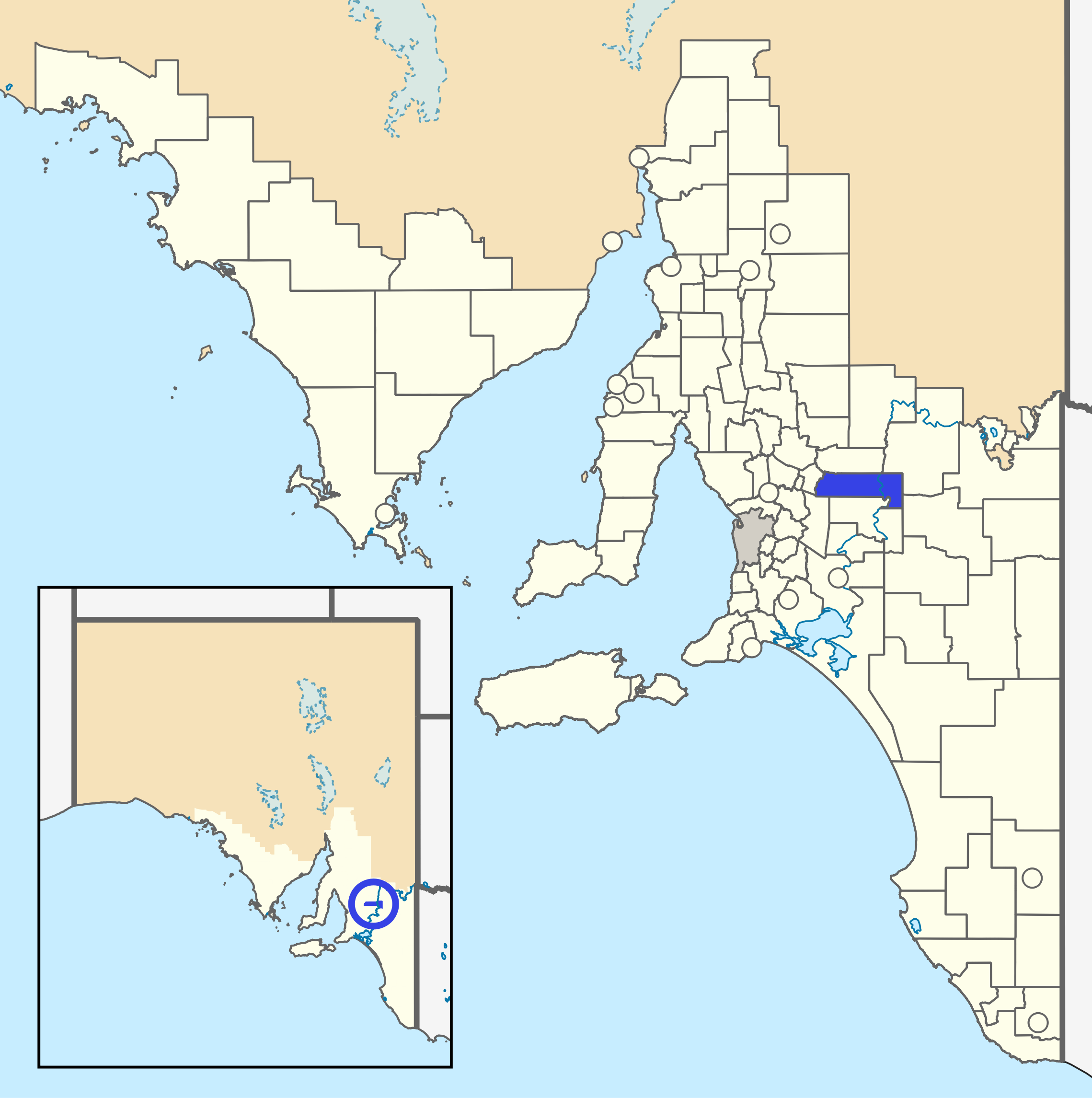
- The District Council of Sedan as it was prior to disestablishment (blue)
- Coordinates: 34°35′0″S 139°18′0″E
- Established: 18 September 1933
- Abolished: 30 January 1976
- Council seat: Sedan
LGAs around District Council of Sedan:
Angaston	Truro	Waikerie
Angaston	Sedan	East Murray
Mount Pleasant	Marne	East Murray

The District Council of Sedan (formerly District Council of Keyneton and Swan Reach) was a local government area in South Australia seated at the town of Sedan from 1933 until 1976.

From the late 1920, the number of local councils in the state was drastically reduced and many councils were amalgamated in accordance with the Local Government Areas (Re-arrangement) Acts 1929 and 1931. The District Council of Keyneton and District Council of Swan Reach were two such and were officially amalgamated on 18 September 1933, although the northern parts of Swan Reach were annexed by Truro and Waikerie weeks prior to the amalgamation. The principal office of the new council was situated at Sedan while the two older council chambers at Keyneton and Swan Reach were also used by the council. The council lands occupied the cadastral hundreds of Jellicoe, Bagot, Fisher and Nildottie. Together, the hundreds of Fisher and Nildottie comprised the Swan Reach ward, the Sedan ward lay within the hundred of Bagot, and the Towitta and Keyneton wards lay within the hundred of Jellicoe.

It was abolished on 30 January 1976 when Sedan was amalgamated with the District Council of Marne to form the new District Council of Ridley.
