= Hundred of Beatty =

Beatty
- Cadastral division
- Coordinates: 34.048°S 139.446°E
- Country: Australia
- State: South Australia
- Region: Western Murraylands
- Established: 15 February 1883

Area
  - Total: 300 km^{2} (116 sq mi)
- County: Eyre
Lands administrative divisions around Beatty
Bundey	Maude	Lindley
Bower	Beatty	Eba
Brownlow	Brownlow; Hay	Hay

The Hundred of Beatty, formerly the Hundred of Krichauff (German: [ˈkʁɪçʔaʊf]), is a cadastral unit of hundred located in the Murraylands of South Australia spanning the localities of Beatty and Mount Mary.

== History ==
The hundred was proclaimed in 1883 in the County of Eyre and named 'Krichauff' for the state parliamentarian Friedrich Krichauff.

In 1888 the District Council of Morgan was established in the area as part of the District Councils Act 1887. It included seven hundreds in addition to the Hundred of Beatty.

In 1918 many South Australian place "names of enemy origin" were changed to sound less German and the hundred was renamed to 'Beatty' after David Beatty, a British naval leader in the First World War.

In 1997 the Morgan council was abolished by amalgamation with Ridley-Truro and Mannum councils, to the south, and the Hundred of Beatty became a part of the much larger Mid Murray Council.
