= District Council of Ridley =

Former local government in South Australia (1976-1991)

Coordinates: 34°39′0″S 139°17′0″E

Location of the former District Council of Ridley

The District Council of Ridley was a local government area in South Australia from 1976 to 1991.

It was established on 30 January 1976 with the amalgamation of the District Council of Marne and the District Council of Sedan. It included the whole of the cadastral Hundreds of Bagot, Fisher, Angas, Ridley, Nildottie and Forster, and parts of the Hundreds of Jellicoe and Bowhill. It was divided into four wards: Marne (two councillors), Forster (one councillor), Sedan (three councillors) and Swan Reach (two councillors).

In 1986, it covered an area district of 2300 square kilometres, described as "bounded by Keyneton, Swan Reach, Bowhill and Sanderston". The major service centres were Cambrai, Sedan and Swan Reach, with smaller townships at Black Hill, Bowhill, Keyneton, Nildottie and Purnong. It had a population of 1,740 in 1985, which had marginally declined since the 1960s. The main primary industries in the largely agricultural district were wheat and barley growing and sheep grazing, with irrigated crops along the Murray River, and tourism along the river being of increasing importance.

It ceased to exist on 1 October 1991, when it amalgamated with the District Council of Truro to form the District Council of Ridley-Truro.

== Chairmen of the District Council of Ridley ==
- Colin Glen Marks (1976)
- Hugh William Glastonbury (1976-1978)
- Colin Glen Marks (1978-1979)
- Hugh William Glastonbury (1979-1980)
- John Laurence Schroeder (1980-?)
