= District Council of Truro =

Australian local government area

Coordinates: 34°24′31″S 139°07′39″E

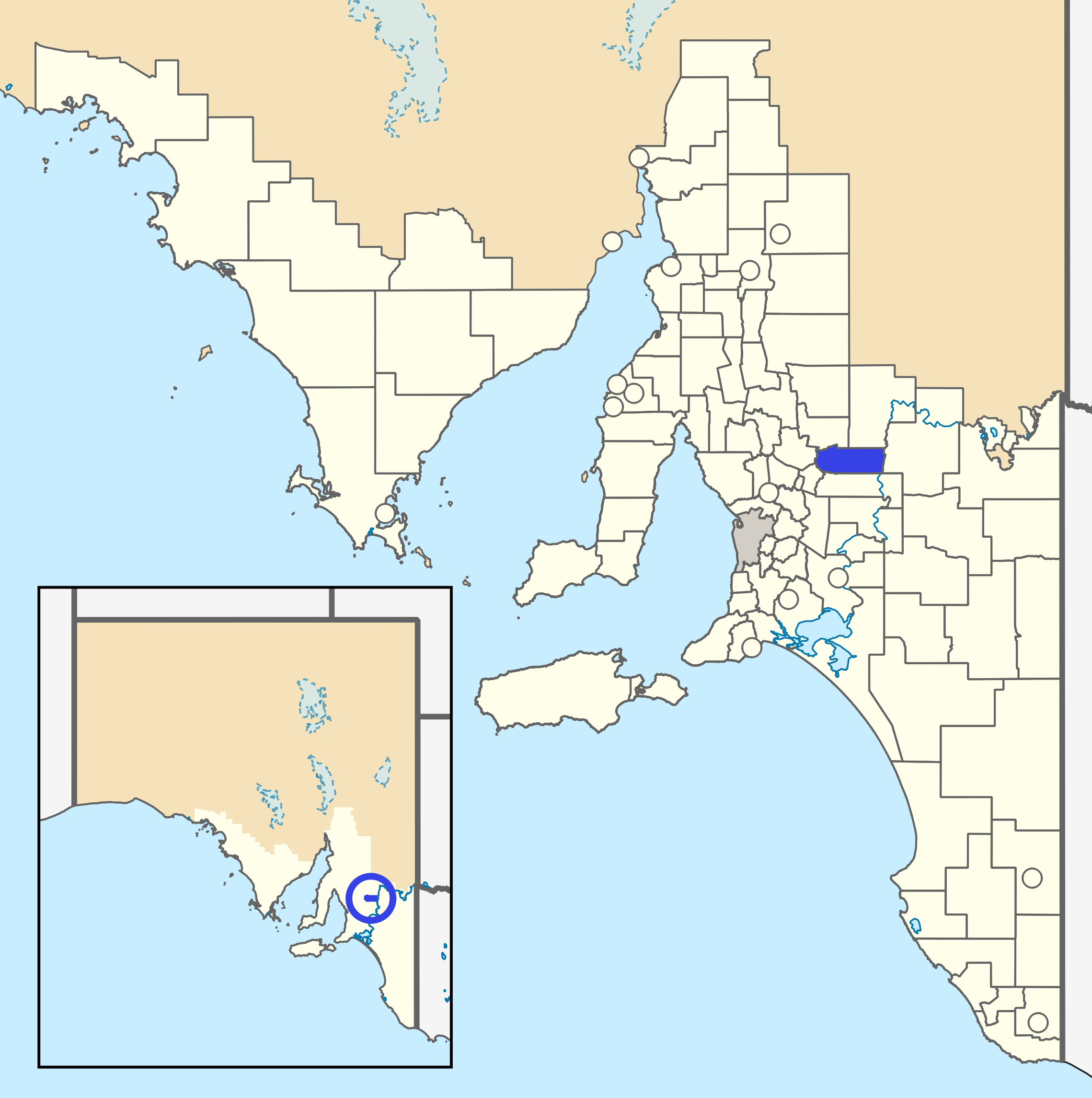
The District Council of Truro as it was prior to disestablishment (blue)

The District Council of Truro was a local government area in South Australia from 1876 to 1991.

It was proclaimed on 15 August 1876, comprising an area of 508 square kilometres, including the Hundred of Anna, the southern portion of the Hundred of Dutton and the northern portion of the Hundred of Jellicoe. There had been two previous proposals to introduce local government in the Truro area, in 1860 and 1868, but these were rejected after local opposition. The council was divided into three wards (Truro, Dutton and Anna), each electing two councillors, on 16 June 1885. In the same year, it built council chambers in Truro township at a cost of £104.

The council gained the Hundred of Skurray on 7 September 1933 from the abolished District Council of Swan Reach, which added the town of Blanchetown. An additional ward, Skurray Ward, was established, electing one councillor. In 1936, the council covered a total area of 190,382 acres, with a population of 892 residing in 450 houses. The council area had a ratable capital value of £292,360, resulting in an annual income for the council of £791/16/2. In that year, it was responsible for 30 miles of main roads and 434 miles of district roads.

In 1966, the council chambers moved to a building adjoining their original chambers. The chambers moved again in 1983, when the council purchased and refurbished a separate building. In 1976, their centenary year, the council published The District Council of Truro: One Hundred Years of Local Government by Reg Munchenburg. A second history by Munchenburg, Truro, the travellers rest, wheels, wheat, wool, 1838-1989 : a history of Truro, Dutton, St. Kitts, Sandleton and Steinfeld was published by the council in 1989.

In 1986, the council district had an area of 792.5 square kilometres, "bounded on the west by the watershed of the Mount Lofty Ranges...and on the east by the Murray River", with a population estimated at 600. The main towns were Truro and Blanchetown. The primary industries of the district were wheat, barley, oats and grazing, with tourism being the main secondary industry.

It was acknowledged by the 1980s that the Truro council would "experience constant pressure for amalgamation or dismemberment" in the coming years. This occurred on 1 October 1991, when the council amalgamated with the District Council of Ridley to form the District Council of Ridley-Truro.

== Chairmen of the District Council of Truro ==
- J. F. A. Habel (1886)
- C. Grieve (1894)
- J. A. Fairey (1922)
- Lindsay Miller (1934-1937)
- Paul Sophus Klemm (1947-1951)
- Walter Mayo Rice (1951-1983)
- Lionel Keith Linke (1983-?)
