= Fisher, South Australia =

Fisher South Australia
- Coordinates: 34°31′48″S 139°32′04″E
- Population: 61 (SAL 2021)
- Established: 27 March 2003
- Postcode(s): 5354
- Time zone: ACST (UTC+9:30)
  - Summer (DST): ACST (UTC+10:30)
- Location: 96 km (60 mi) NE of Adelaide; 47 km (29 mi) NE of Mannum
- LGA(s): Mid Murray Council
- Region: Murray and Mallee
- County: Eyre
- State electorate(s): Chaffey
- Federal division(s): Barker
| Mean max temp | Mean min temp | Annual rainfall |
| 21.6 °C; 71 °F | 9.2 °C; 49 °F | 474.2 mm 18.7 in |
Suburbs around Fisher:
| Sandleton | Blanchetown | Paisley |
| Sedan | Fisher | Paisley; Swan Reach |
| Sedan | Swan Reach | Swan Reach |
- Footnotes: Adjoining localities

Fisher is a locality in the Australian state of South Australia located about 96 kilometres (60 mi) north-east of the state capital of Adelaide and about 47 kilometres (29 mi) north-east of the municipal seat in Mannum.

Fisher consists of land in the northern part of the cadastral unit of the Hundred of Fisher with a smaller portion extending to the north into the hundred of Skurray. The portion within the Hundred of Fisher is bounded to the north and to the west by the boundaries of the hundred, to the south by the Stott Highway and to the east in two parts - the centre-line of the channel of the Murray River in the north and the Murraylands Road in the south.

The locality’s name is derived from the Hundred of Fisher. Its boundaries were created on 27 March 2003 for the "local established name".

The majority of the land use within the locality is "primary production" while some land in its south-west corner being zoned for “rural living”. Land in its north-east corner, i.e. sections 196 and 197 in the Hundred of Fisher, forms part of the private protected area known as the Yookamurra Sanctuary.

Fisher is located within the federal division of Barker, the state electoral district of Chaffey and the local government area of the Mid Murray Council.
