= Hundred of Jellicoe =

Jellicoe
- Cadastral division
- Coordinates: 34.51°S 139.20°E
- Country: Australia
- State: South Australia
- LGA: Mid Murray Council
- Established: 7 August 1851
- County: Eyre
Lands administrative divisions around Jellicoe
| Belvidere | Dutton | Anna |
| Moorooroo | Jellicoe | Bagot |
| Jutland | Jutland | Angas |

The Hundred of Jellicoe (formerly Hundred of North Rhine; (/raɪn/ RYNE) is a cadastral hundred in the County of Eyre in South Australia. It is located on the east Mount Lofty Ranges foothills. The Hundred of North Rhine was proclaimed in 1851 but the name was changed in 1918 to the current, after Admiral John Jellicoe, as part of a process to remove "names of enemy origin" at the time of World War I.

The Hundred of Jellicoe includes the township and most of the locality of Truro, Towitta, Keyneton and a portion of the western edge of the locality of Sedan.

The original name "North Rhine" is in reference to the North Rhine River, a tributary of the Marne River (formerly known as South Rhine). The North Rhine flows southwards through the hundred from its source at the north western boundary between Moculta and Keyneton (part of the western boundary between the Hundred of Moorooroo and Jellicoe) to join the Marne about 9 km (5.6 mi) east of Eden Valley. Pioneer Johann Menge named the North and South Rhine, not for any particular similarity to the River Rhine of western Europe, but because he expected a similar yield of wine from the region.

== Local governance ==
The first council in the area was the District Council of North Rhine, renamed in 1918 like the hundred, to Keyneton, after the main township in the hundred. In 1933 the council amalgamated with the District Council of Swan Reach to form the new District Council of Keyneton and Swan Reach.

== See also ==
- Lands administrative divisions of South Australia
