= Brownlow, South Australia =

Brownlow
- Suburb
- Coordinates: 34.245410°S 139.269270°E
- Country: Australia
- State: South Australia
- LGA: Regional Council of Goyder Mid Murray Council
- Location: 98 km (61 mi) north of Adelaide city centre
- Established: 2000

Government
  - State electorate: Stuart
  - Federal division: Grey

Population
  - Total: 43 (SAL 2021)
- Time zone: UTC+9:30 (ACST)
  - Summer (DST): UTC+10:30 (ACST)
- Postcode: 5374
- Mean max temp: 21.1 °C (70.0 °F)
- Mean min temp: 9.3 °C (48.7 °F)
- Annual rainfall: 477.5 mm (18.80 in)
Suburbs around Brownlow
Sutherlands	Bower; Mount Mary	Mount Mary
Sutherlands; Neales Flat; Frankton	Brownlow	Blanchetown
Dutton East	Steinfeld	Blanchetown
- Coordinates; Locations; Climate; Adjoining localities

Brownlow is a locality in the Australian state of South Australia about 98 kilometres (61 miles) north-east of the Adelaide city centre

Its boundaries were created for the “long established name” for the western part in August 2000 which is located within the Regional Council of Goyder and for the eastern part in March 2003 which is located within the Mid Murray Council. The name comes from the older cadastral land division in which Brownlow lies, the Hundred of Brownlow, which was named for Charles Henry Brownlow.

The principal land use within the locality is agriculture involving "extensive grazing."

Brownlow is located within the federal divisions of Barker and Grey, the state electoral district of Stuart and the local government areas of the Mid Murray Council and Regional Council of Goyder.

== Hundred of Brownlow ==
Brownlow
- Cadastral division
- Country: Australia
- State: South Australia
- Established: 15 February 1883

Area
  - Total: 340 km^{2} (130 sq mi)

Population
  - Total: 43 (SAL 2021)
- County: Eyre
Lands administrative divisions around Brownlow
Bower	Bower; Beatty	Beatty
Neales	Brownlow	Hay
Dutton	Anna	Skurray

The Hundred of Brownlow is the cadastral unit of hundred containing the Brownlow locality. It is one of the 16 hundreds of the County of Eyre. It was named in 1883 by Governor William Jervois after Charles Henry Brownlow (1831–1916), a senior (British) Indian Army officer at the time.

The locality of Brownlow occupies the majority of the land area of the Hundred of Brownlow, but parts of Bower and Mount Mary occupy smaller portions in the north of the hundred and part of Steinfeld overlaps the southern boundary.

== See also ==
- Brownlow (disambiguation)
- Lands administrative divisions of South Australia
