= Wombats Rest =

- Suburb
- Coordinates: 34°07′06″S 139°40′10″E
- Country: Australia
- State: South Australia
- Region: Murray and Mallee
- LGA: Mid Murray Council
- Location: 133 km (83 mi) north-east of Adelaide; 94 km (58 mi) north-east of Mannum; 9 km (5.6 mi) south of Morgan
- Established: 27 March 2003

Government
  - State electorate: Chaffey
  - Federal division: Barker
- Time zone: UTC+9:30 (ACST)
  - Summer (DST): UTC+10:30 (ACST)
- Postcode: 5320
- County: Eyre
- Mean max temp: 21.1 °C (70.0 °F)
- Mean min temp: 9.3 °C (48.7 °F)
- Annual rainfall: 448.6 mm (17.66 in)
Suburbs around Wombats Rest
Morgan	Morgan; Murbko	Murbko
Morgan	Wombats Rest	Murbko
Morgan	Morgan; Murbko	Murbko
- Locations; Adjoining localities

Wombats Rest is a locality in the Australian state of South Australia located in the state’s east on the western side of the Murray River about 133 kilometres (83 mi) north-east of the state capital of Adelaide and about 94 kilometres (58 mi) north-east of the municipal seat of Mannum.

Its boundaries were created on 27 March 2003, for the “long established name.”

Land use within Wombats Rest is entirely residential accommodation, with historical use for “‘holiday’ occupancy”, which is known as a shack site in Australia. Development within the locality has limits due to its location within the Murray River’s floodplain to “minimise damage to buildings” caused by regular flooding.

Wombats Rest is located within the federal division of Barker, the state electoral district of Chaffey and the local government area of the Mid Murray Council.
