= Blanchetown Aerodrome =

- IATA: none; ICAO: YBCN

Summary
- Airport type: Private
- Owner: Scouts South Australia
- Operator: Roonka Scouts
- Serves: Blanchetown, South Australia
- Location: Donald Flat, near Blanchetown
- Elevation AMSL: 140 ft / 43 m
- Coordinates: 34°15′07″S 139°36′09″E

Map
- Location in South Australia

Runways
Direction	Length		Surface
Direction	m	ft	Surface
13/31	1,470	4,823	Dirt
10/28	1,370	4,495	Dirt
15/33	1,200	3,937	Dirt
02/20	1,100	3,609	Dirt
05/23	900	2,953	Dirt

Blanchetown Aerodrome (YBCN) is a small private Aircraft Landing Area (ALA) located at Donald Flat near Blanchetown, South Australia, approximately 71 NM (132 km) northeast of Adelaide. It is owned and operated by Scouts Australia, and is used primarily for recreational flying activities, including motorised gliding.

== History ==
The aerodrome is situated near the Roonka River Adventure Park, a Scouts SA property along the Murray River near Blanchetown. The park has been managed by Scouts SA for youth camping, water activities, and aviation pursuits for more than 50 years. Specific details on the construction or opening of the aerodrome are limited, but it has been documented as a private facility for Scout aviation activities since at least the early 2000s. The site supports gliding and other low-intensity flying, aligning with the organisation's focus on adventure and outdoor education.

== Facilities ==
Blanchetown Aerodrome features multiple unsealed dirt landing strips suitable for light aircraft and gliders. There are no permanent structures, lighting, or fuel services available. A windsock is present for wind indication, but no runway markers are installed.

Key facilities include:

- Runways: Five directional strips, all unsealed:
  - 13/31: 1,470 m (4,823 ft)
  - 10/28: 1,370 m (4,495 ft)
  - 15/33: 1,200 m (3,937 ft)
  - 02/20: 1,100 m (3,609 ft)
  - 05/23: 900 m (2,953 ft)
- Elevation: 140 ft (43 m) AMSL
- Coordinates: 34°15′07″S 139°36′09″E
- Communications: CTAF 126.7 MHz; Melbourne Centre 125.3 MHz (in circuit); HF frequencies 3461, 6565, 8822 kHz

Access is strictly private and limited to authorised users, primarily Roonka Scouts members. The aerodrome is not certified for public or commercial use and appears in the Australian En Route Supplement Australia (ERSA) as an ALA.

== Incidents ==
On 13 November 1983, a Schneider ES-49 glider (VH-GFO) was involved in an instructional dual flight at Blanchetown. During a sideslip demonstration on final approach, the glider experienced a high rate of sink and landed short of the threshold, unable to avoid obstacles on the ground run. There were no injuries to the two crew members. No other major aviation incidents or accidents have been recorded at YBCN by the Australian Transport Safety Bureau.
