= District Council of Swan Reach =

- Local government area
- Coordinates: 34.466°S 139.590°E
- Country: Australia
- State: South Australia
- Established: 1888
- Abolished: 1933
- Council seat: Blanchetown; Swan Reach
LGAs around District Council of Swan Reach
Truro	Morgan	Waikerie (from 1914)
Keyneton	District Council of Swan Reach	East Murray (from 1923)
Angas	Caurnamont	Karoonda (from 1922)

The District Council of Swan Reach (formerly District Council of Blanchetown) was a local government area in the Murraylands of South Australia from 1888 to 1933.

== History ==
The council was established in January 1888 by promulgation of the District Councils Act 1887. It occupied the hundreds of Skurray, Fisher, Nildottie and Paisley.

In 1898 the newly-gazetted hundreds of Murbko and Bakara (in the County of Albert) were added to the district.

In 1920 the council name was changed to 'Swan Reach'.

In September 1933 the District Council of Keyneton amalgamated with Swan Reach to become new District Council of Keyneton and Swan Reach (later called Sedan).
