= Hundred of English =

English
- Cadastral division
- Coordinates: 34.0°S 139.1°E
- Country: Australia
- State: South Australia
- Established: 12 July 1866

Area
  - Total: 290 km^{2} (113 sq mi)
- County: Eyre
Lands administrative divisions around English
Apoinga	Bright	Bundey
Waterloo	English	Bower
Julia Creek	Neales

The Hundred of English is a cadastral unit of hundred containing all or part of the localities of Brady Creek (also in Hundred of Apoinga), Robertstown (extends into both Hundreds of Apoinga and Bright), Rocky Plain, Geranium Plains (spans hundreds of Bright, Bundey and Bower), Ngapala, Point Pass, Australia Plains (also in Hundred of Bower) and Eudunda (mostly in Hundred of Neales). It is one of the 16 hundreds of the County of Eyre. It was named in 1866 by Governor of South Australia, Dominick Daly after T English MLC (1820–1884), a former mayor of Adelaide and current Member of the colony's Legislative Council at the time.

Local government came to the Hundred of English when the District Council of English was established on 31 October 1878, with boundaries the same as the hundred. The Hundred of English became the English and Point Pass wards of the District Council of Robertstown in 1932. It became part of the much larger Regional Council of Goyder in 1997.
