= Roonka Conservation Park =

Protected area in South Australia

- IUCN category III (natural monument or feature)
- Location within South Australia
- Location: South Australia
- Nearest city: Blanchetown
- Coordinates: 34.3014°S 139.6361°Es
- Area: 1.02 km^{2} (0.39 sq mi)
- Established: 27 July 1978
- Governing body: Department for Environment and Water

Roonka Conservation Park is a protected area in the Australian state of South Australia located in the gazetted locality of Blanchetown about 5.8 kilometres (3.6 mi) north of the Blanchetown town centre, in Ngarrindjeri country. It is the location of Roonka Flat, the largest excavated burial site in Australia.

== Location ==
The conservation park is located on land in sections 4 and 5 in the cadastral unit of the Hundred of Hay on the western side of the Murray River. It was constituted under the National Parks and Wildlife Act 1972 on 27 July 1978. As of July 2016, the conservation park covered an area of 1.02 square kilometres (0.39 sq mi).

In 1980, it was described as follows:

Roonka Conservation Park contains a most important archaeological site, spanning about 18,000 years. It has yielded evidence of an extremely wide variety of mortuary practices, a large range of archaeological phenomena and a long cultural sequence. The site has been excavated over more than a decade by the South Australian Museum.

The conservation park is classified as an IUCN Category III protected area. In 1980, it was listed on the now-defunct Register of the National Estate.

== Roonka Flat ==
Roonka Flat, located inside the conservation park, is the largest excavated burial site in Australia. The open-air site is located on an elevated terrace beside the Murray River, and is an area of both occupation and a burial ground.

=== History of occupation ===
The earliest layer of occupation at the site has been dated to between 20,000 and 16,000 years before the present. The earliest burials at the site have been dated to circa 8,000 years before the present.

There is significant evidence of occupation and two burials from this time. Other evidence shows newer use of the area as a burial ground from 7,000 BC to 5,000 BC. From 2,000 BC until European settlement in the 19th century, it was again settled.

Twelve tombs are dated to between 7,000 and 4,000 years before present. The bodies were placed vertically in a well, with pendants of pierced shells and bones. The bones of some skeletons appear to have been rearranged. A body was found with a stone dagger 29 cm long, presumably used to open the rib cage. 70 other burials date from after 4,000 BC and reveal changes in funeral rites. The bodies of adult males are in an extended or contracted position. The tombs contain offerings, bone awls, hairpins and stone objects. Some individuals were buried in elaborate costume, with jewelry and accompanied by a child.

=== Analysis of human remains ===
Skeletal remains recovered from the site exhibit traumatic injuries, including cranial fractures and depressed skull lesions attributed to blunt force trauma. One of the most extensively studied burials (OA 1), a pregnant woman aged approximately 30–40 years, exhibited severe perimortem cranial injuries. Although the burial was originally interpreted as a possible case of euthanasia during a difficult childbirth, a later re-analysis concluded that the evidence is more consistent with interpersonal violence.

Paleoradiological studies also found a relatively low survival rate into older age among the Roonka population, with only 5.8% of individuals estimated to have lived beyond 50 years of age, and 26% dying between the ages of 31 and 50.

== See also ==
- Protected areas of South Australia
