= Big Bend, South Australia =

Big Bend
- Town
- Coordinates: 34.635°S 139.615°E
- Country: Australia
- State: South Australia
- LGA: Mid Murray Council

Government
  - State electorate: Chaffey
  - Federal division: Barker

Population
  - Total: 4 (SAL 2016)
- Time zone: UTC+9:30 (ACST)
  - Summer (DST): UTC+10:30 (ACDT)
- Postcode: 5238
Localities around Big Bend
	Swan Reach
	Big Bend
Sunnydale

Big Bend in South Australia is the longest single bend in the Murray River. The area is known for its spectacular riverside cliffs, which are the tallest along the Murray River. The limestone cliffs are rich with millions of ocean fossils and are home to colonies of bats. Caves in the area have been continuously occupied for at least 8,000 years and are sacred to the local aboriginal community. There is a collection of holiday shacks located on the banks.

The gazetted locality of Big Bend is on the left bank of the Murray River, upstream of the actual big bend in the river. The opposite bank is in the locality of Sunnydale. The locality is named for the row of shacks on some low ground near river level downstream of the town of Swan Reach. Views of the bend in the river are observed from near the road between Swan Reach and Nildottie which runs along the top of the cliffs.

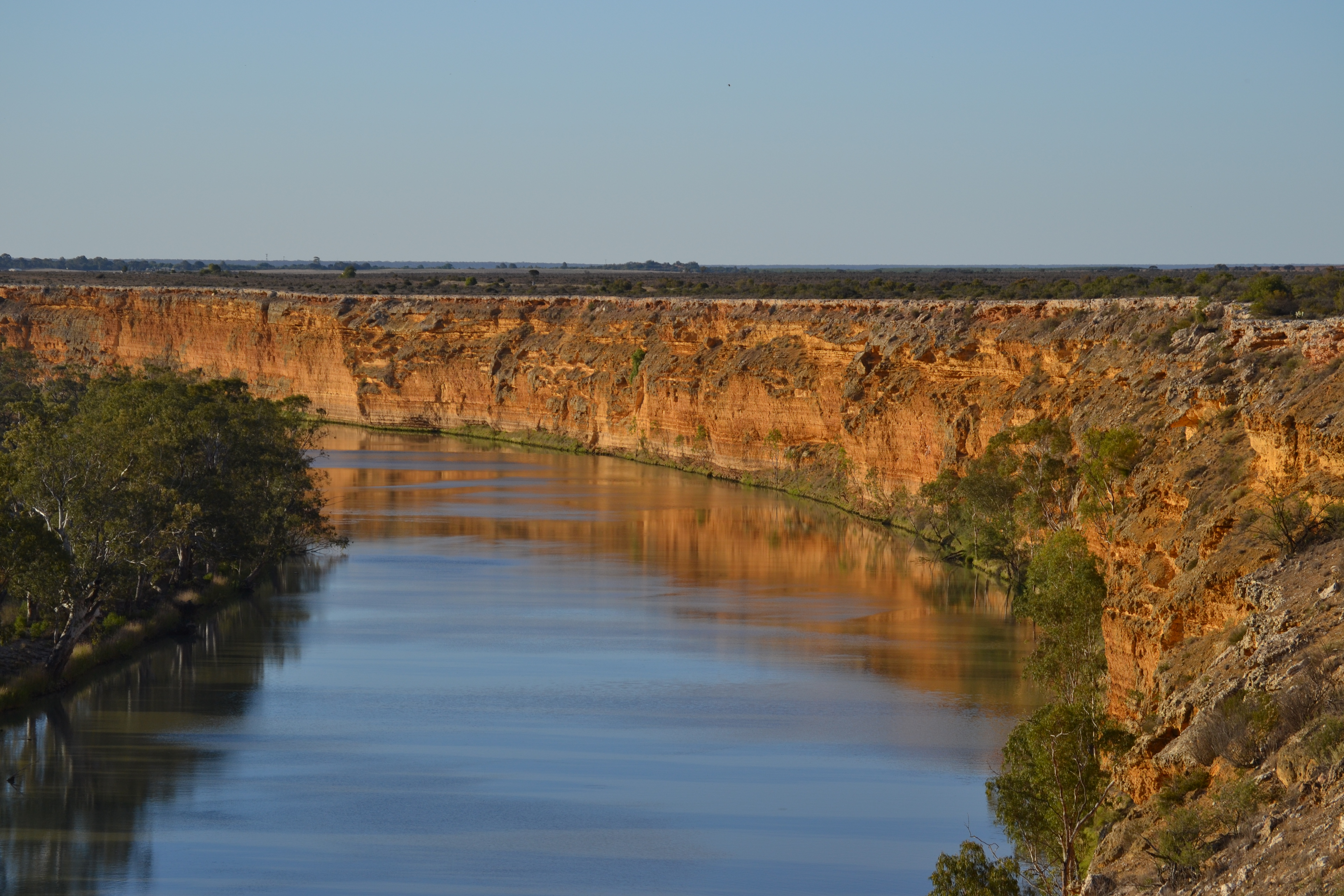
Upstream view from Big Bend lookout, Murray River, South Australia (17 Dec 2025)

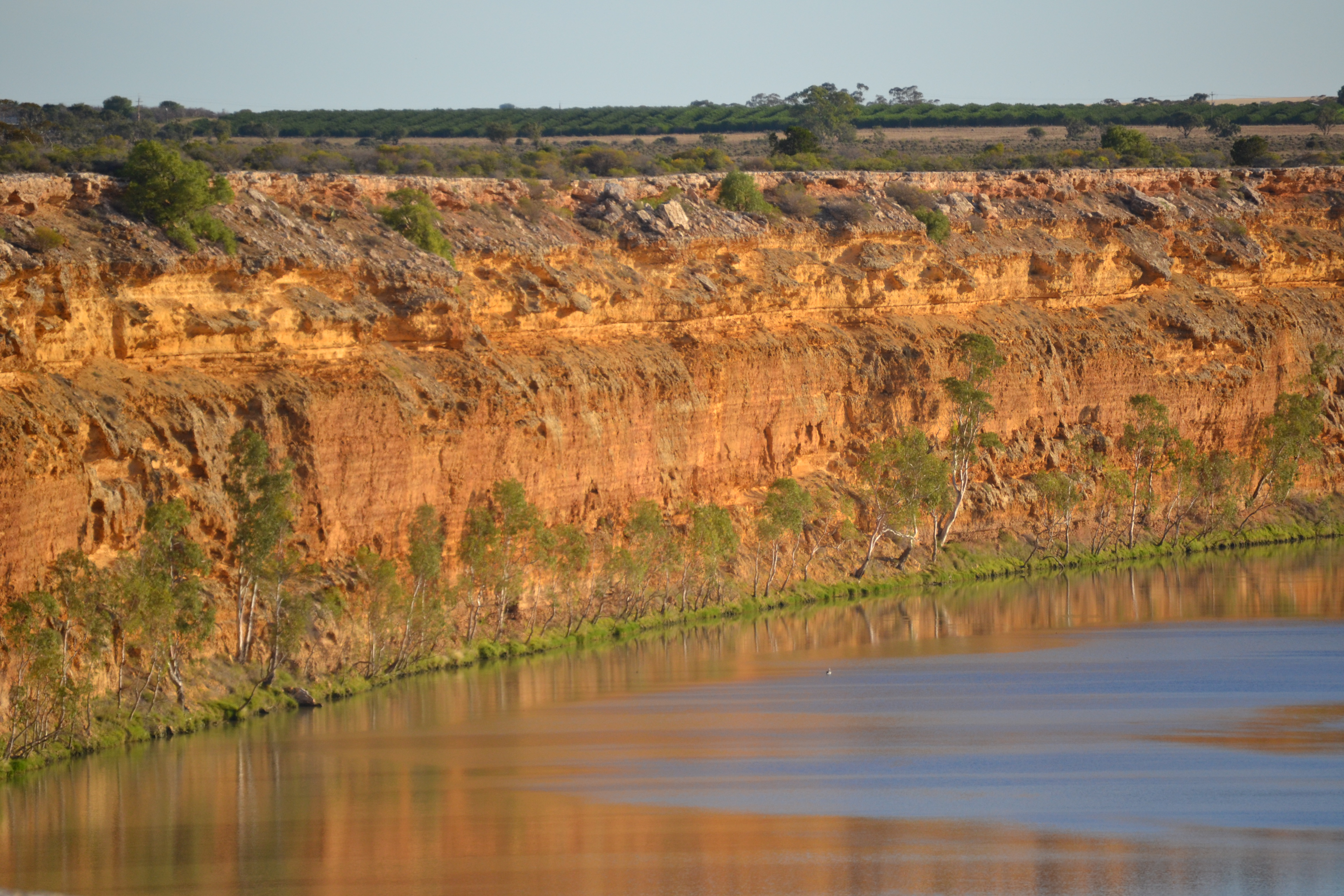
Downstream view from Big Bend lookout, Murray River, South Australia (17 Dec 2025)

The river turns northwest just past the southeastern end of the row of shacks, passes a lagoon, then makes the sweeping Big Bend to the right through approximately 180 degrees. Then after an almost straight section, continues the right turn through another 90 degrees before the left turn round Ngaut Ngaut Conservation Park.
