= Annadale, South Australia =

Annadale South Australia
- Coordinates: 34.39°S 139.35°E
- Postcode(s): 5356
- Location: 23 km (14 mi) east of Truro; 25 km (16 mi) west of Blanchetown; 94 km (58 mi) north of Murray Bridge
- LGA(s): Mid Murray Council
- State electorate(s): Stuart
- Federal division(s): Barker
Localities around Annadale:
	Steinfeld
Truro	Annadale	Blanchetown
Sedan	Sandleton

Annadale is a locality in South Australia. It is located on the plains east of the Mount Lofty Ranges astride the Sturt Highway 110 kilometres (68 mi) from Adelaide, between Truro and Blanchetown, South Australia. Halfway House Road is a heavy vehicle detour route that runs south from the Sturt Highway at Annadale. Annadale occupies the central part of the hundred of Anna.

Annadale was established as a private subdivision laid out by a farmer named Joseph W Vigar in 1881. Its name was adopted from a well in the area.

Annadale is the site of the Truro Flat Airpark (ICAO: YTFA) owned by the Barossa Birdmen.
