= McBean Pound =

- Suburb
- Coordinates: 34°17′07″S 139°37′46″E
- Country: Australia
- State: South Australia
- Region: Murray and Mallee
- LGA: Mid Murray Council
- Location: 118 km (73 mi) north-east of Adelaide; 76 km (47 mi) north-east of Mannum; 28 km (17 mi) south of Morgan
- Established: 27 March 2003

Government
  - State electorate: Chaffey
  - Federal division: Barker
- Time zone: UTC+9:30 (ACST)
  - Summer (DST): UTC+10:30 (ACST)
- Postcode: 5357
- County: Eyre
- Mean max temp: 21.1 °C (70.0 °F)
- Mean min temp: 9.3 °C (48.7 °F)
- Annual rainfall: 448.6 mm (17.66 in)
Suburbs around McBean Pound
Blanchetown	Blanchetown; Murbko	Murbko
Blanchetown	McBean Pound	Murbko
Blanchetown	Blanchetown; Murbko	Murbko
- Locations; Adjoining localities

McBean Pound is a locality in the Australian state of South Australia located in the Riverland in the state’s east on the western side of the Murray River about 118 kilometres (73 mi) north-east of the state capital of Adelaide about 76 kilometres (47 mi) north-east of the municipal seat of Mannum.

The locality consists of a river flat known as McBean Pound which included a lagoon called McBean Pond, high ground to the west which is bounded by Boy Scout Road and the portion of the river east of the middle of its channel. The Roonka Conservation Park adjoins the locality’s south boundary.

Its boundaries were created on 27 March 2003 for the “long established name” of McBean Pound. In 1927, Rodney Cockburn, the journalist, described it as "bounded by the stream on one side and on the other by a high cliff, a perfectly natural pound is formed. It was used only for grazing purposes, and at times was subject to inundation."

The name is reported by the South Australian historian, Geoffrey Manning as being derived from the brothers, Lachlan and Alexander McBean, who held an “occupation license” for the ‘Roonka Roonka’ station which was located on the western side of the Murray River. Both Cockburn and Manning report that during the 1850s, McBean Pound was “one of the first sites” considered for a railway crossing over the river.

Land use within McBean Pound consists of residential accommodation, land intended for tourism and recreation use, and land controlled by conservation and floodplain management policy. The residential accommodation whose historical use is for “‘holiday’ occupancy” and which is known as a shack site in Australia occupies the eastern side of the river flat and the northern end of the cliff line.

McBean Pound is located within the federal division of Barker, the state electoral district of Chaffey and the local government area of the Mid Murray Council.
