= Murbko, South Australia =

Murbko South Australia
- Coordinates: 34.2°S 139.7°E
- Population: 105 (SAL 2021)
- Gazetted: 2000 (Loxton Waikerie) and 2003 (Mid Murray)
- Postcode(s): 5320
- LGA(s): District Council of Loxton Waikerie; Mid Murray Council
- State electorate(s): Chaffey
- Federal division(s): Barker
Localities around Murbko:
| Morgan | Cadell | Cadell |
| Morgan; Wombats Rest; Morgan; Blanchetown; McBean Pound; Blanchetown | Murbko | Cadell; Stockyard Plain |
| Blanchetown | Paisley | Stockyard Plain |
- Footnotes: Adjoining localities

Murbko is a locality in the Murray Mallee region of South Australia. It is located on the left bank of the Murray River downstream of the northwest bend where the river turns to flow roughly south. The river forms the western boundary of Murbko, and the southern boundary is approximately the Sturt Highway as it crosses the mallee away from the river from the Blanchetown bridge towards Waikerie. Murbko Lutheran church was built in 1907 and is still in use.

The southern two-thirds of Murbko are in the District Council of Loxton Waikerie and the electoral district of Chaffey while the northern third is in the Mid Murray Council. The entire locality is in the federal Division of Barker.

The modern locality of Murbko includes a number of historic landings and homesteads along the river from the time when riverboats provided the most reliable transport. These include Woods Flat which had a school and institute.
