= Paisley, South Australia =

Paisley South Australia
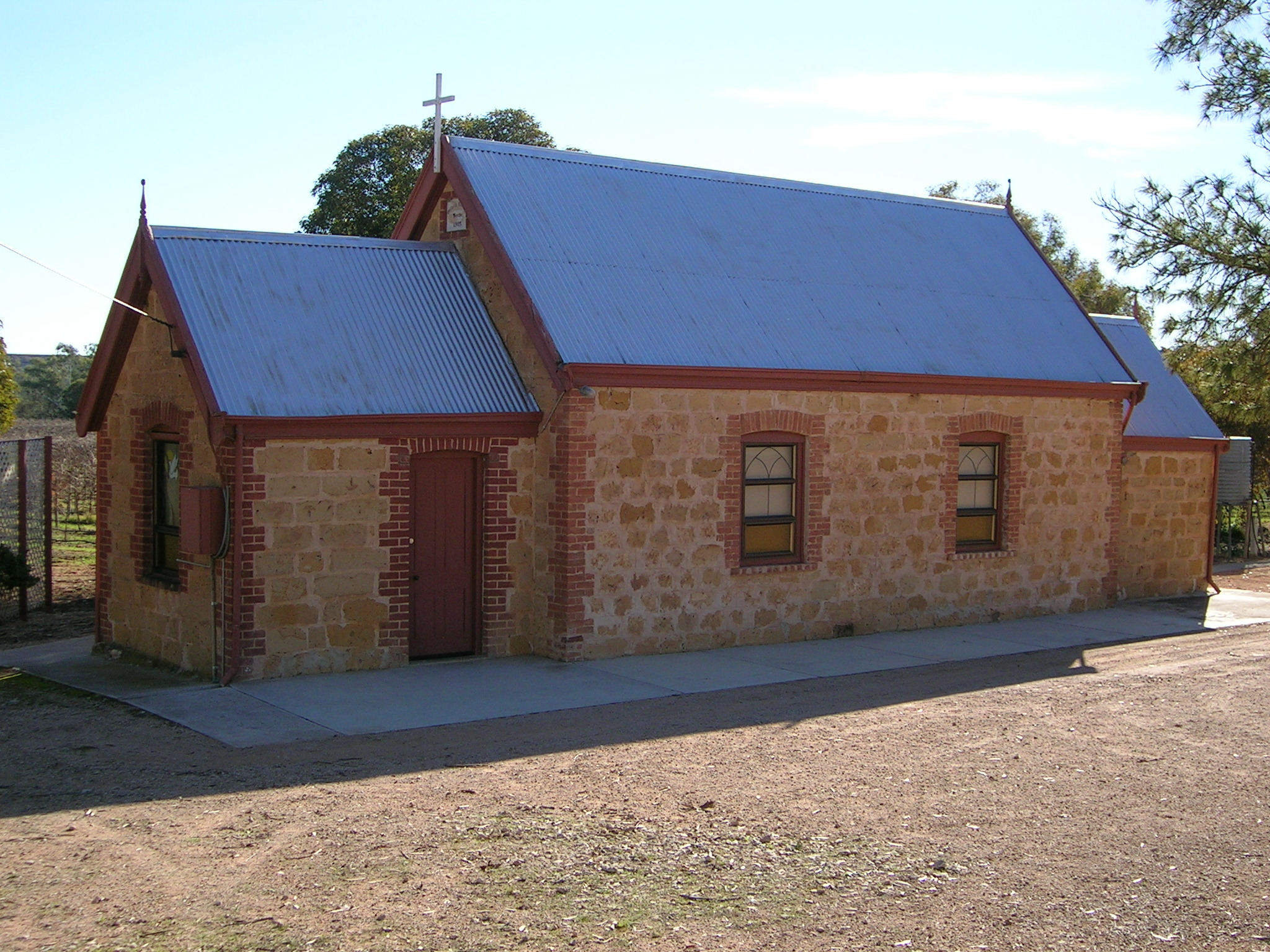
- Advent Lutheran Church, Blanchetown

- Coordinates: 34°20′30″S 139°37′30″E
- Population: 96 (SAL 2021)
- Gazetted: September 2000
- Postcode(s): 5357
- Location: 40 km (25 mi) SW of Waikerie
- LGA(s): District Council of Loxton Waikerie
- State electorate(s): Chaffey
- Federal division(s): Barker
Localities around Paisley:
	Murbko	Stockyard Plain
Blanchetown	Paisley	Notts Well
Fisher	Swan Reach

Paisley is a locality in the Murray Mallee region of South Australia, across the Murray River from Blanchetown, South Australia. It was formally named in September 2000 for the Hundred of Paisley which contains it. The Hundred of Paisley was named by Governor MacDonnell in 1861 for his private secretary, J. G. Paisley.

The Sturt Highway crosses the northwestern corner of Paisley at the eastern end of the Blanchetown Bridge over the Murray River. The Advent Lutheran Church Blanchetown is actually in Paisley, a few hundred metres north of the eastern end of the bridge.
