= Dutton, South Australia =

Dutton South Australia
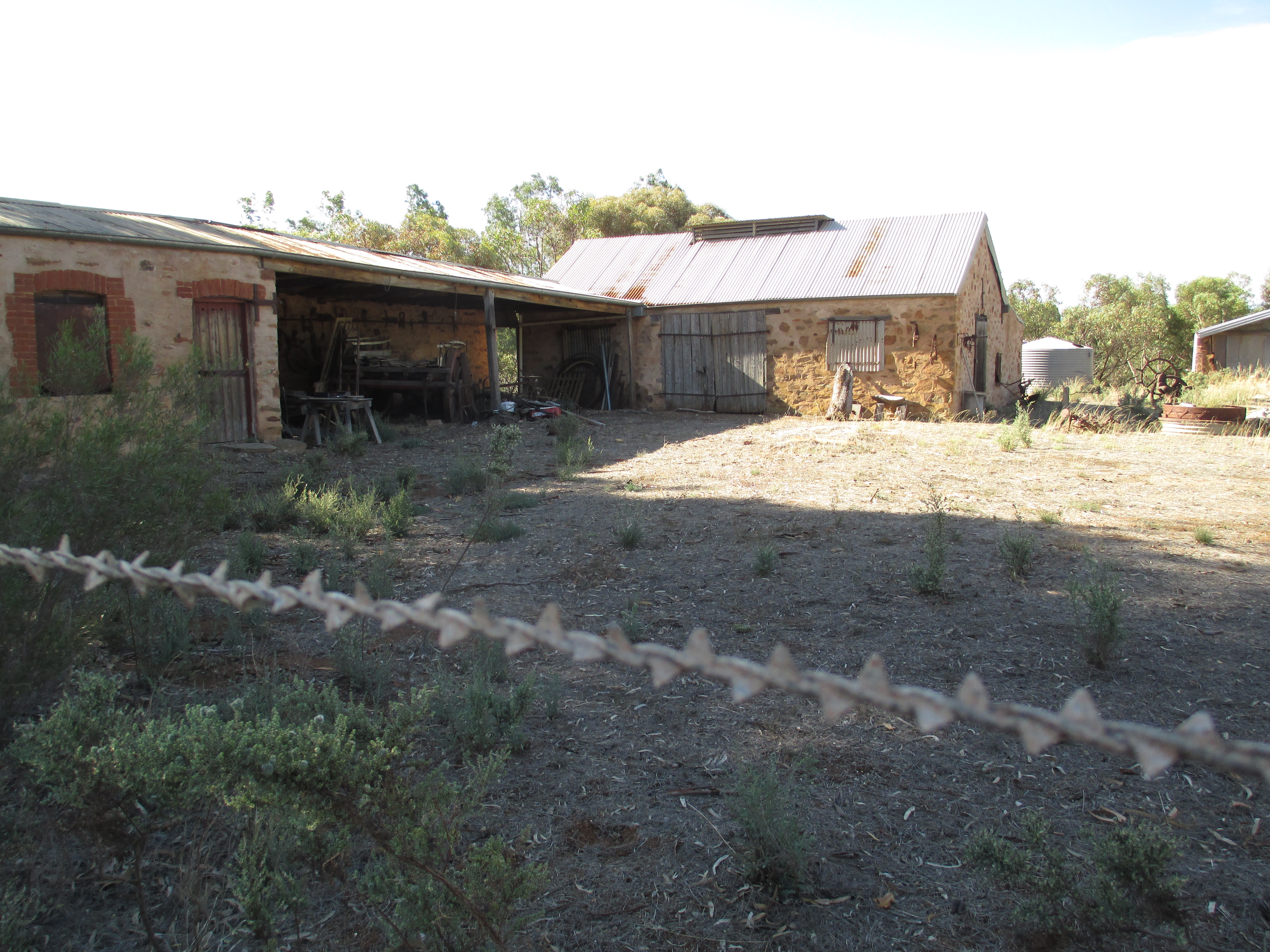
- Former blacksmith workshop at Dutton

- Coordinates: 34°27′0″S 138°21′0″E
- Population: 133 (SAL 2021)
- Established: 1866
- Postcode(s): 5356
- Elevation: 84 m (276 ft)
- Time zone: ACST (UTC+9:30)
  - Summer (DST): ACST (UTC+10:30)
- Location: 6 km (4 mi) N of Truro; 24 km (15 mi) S of Eudunda
- LGA(s): Mid Murray Council; Regional Council of Goyder
- State electorate(s): Stuart
- Federal division(s): Barker; Grey
Localities around Dutton:
Hansborough	Eudunda	Neales Flat, Frankton
St Kitts	Dutton	Dutton East
	Truro

Dutton is a settlement in South Australia. The small township lies approximately six kilometres (3.7 mi) north of Truro on the Eudunda Road. It was first laid out in 1866 and lots were advertised for sale in the German-language newspaper Südaustralische Zeitung.

The Hundred may have been named after Francis Stacker Dutton, a two-time Premier of South Australia, instigator of the Kapunda Copper Mine, South Australian commissioner at the 1862 International Exhibition, and Agent-General for South Australia in London. Francis was the younger brother of Frederick Dutton, the proprietor of Anlaby Station, near Kapunda.

Dutton School opened in 1880 and closed in 1903. Dutton North School, built on the Levi's Water Hole property near the boundary with Frankton, opened in 1914 and closed in 1927. It also once had a Lutheran school.

The historic former St John's Lutheran Manse and Blacksmith's Shop and Dwelling are listed on the South Australian Heritage Register.

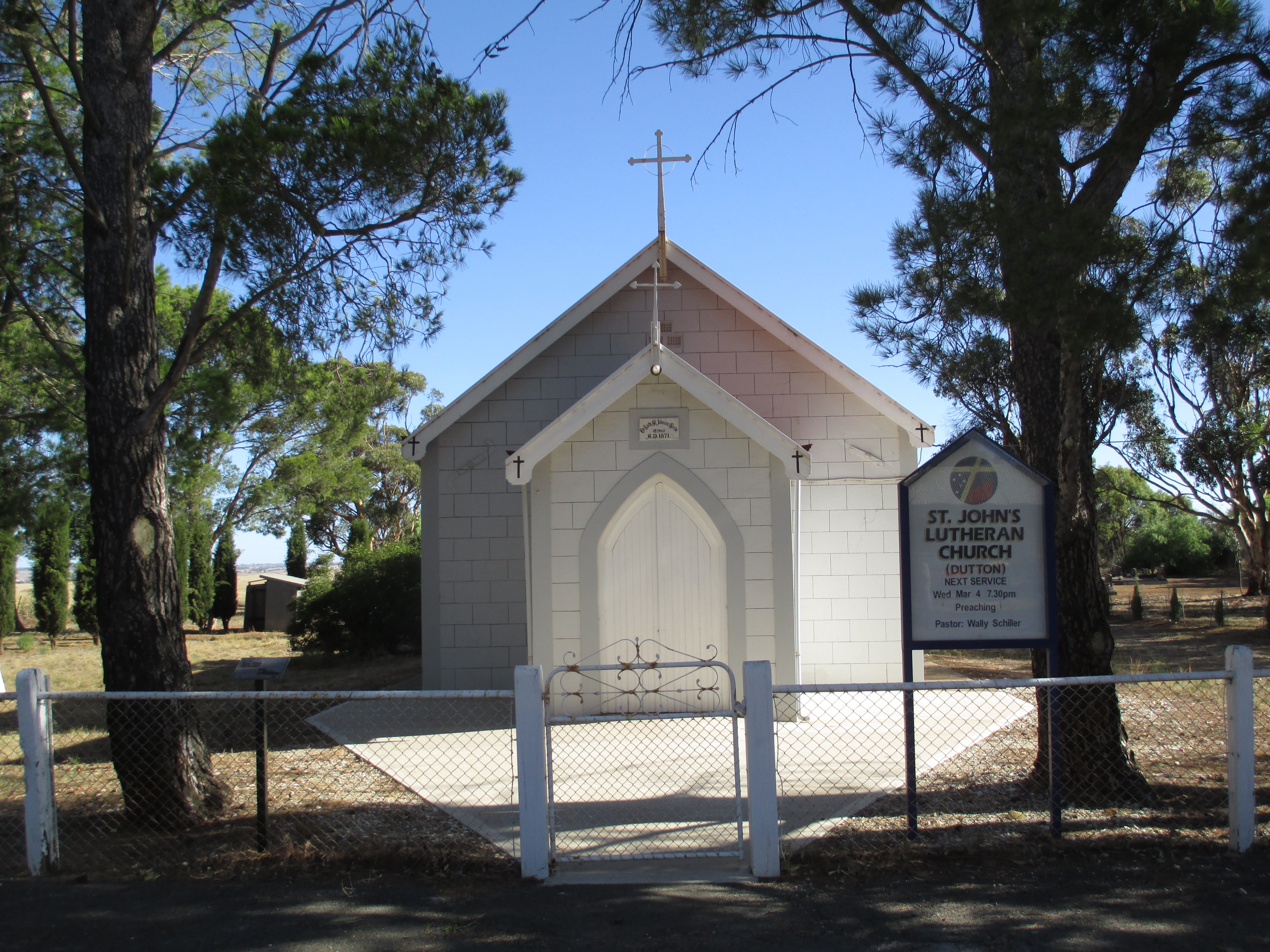
St John's Lutheran church at Dutton

The Hundred of Dutton, was proclaimed on 12 August 1858. The South Australian Government Gazette of 12 August 1858 delineates the Hundred of Dutton as "Bounded on the east by a due north line from the north-east angle of the Hundred of North Rhine, ten miles in length; thence by a line due west, to the eastern boundary of the County of Light; thence south by the last-named boundary, to the north-west corner of the Hundred of North Rhine; thence, by the northern boundary of the said Hundred, to the point of commencement."
