= Mount Mary, South Australia =

Mount Mary
- Town
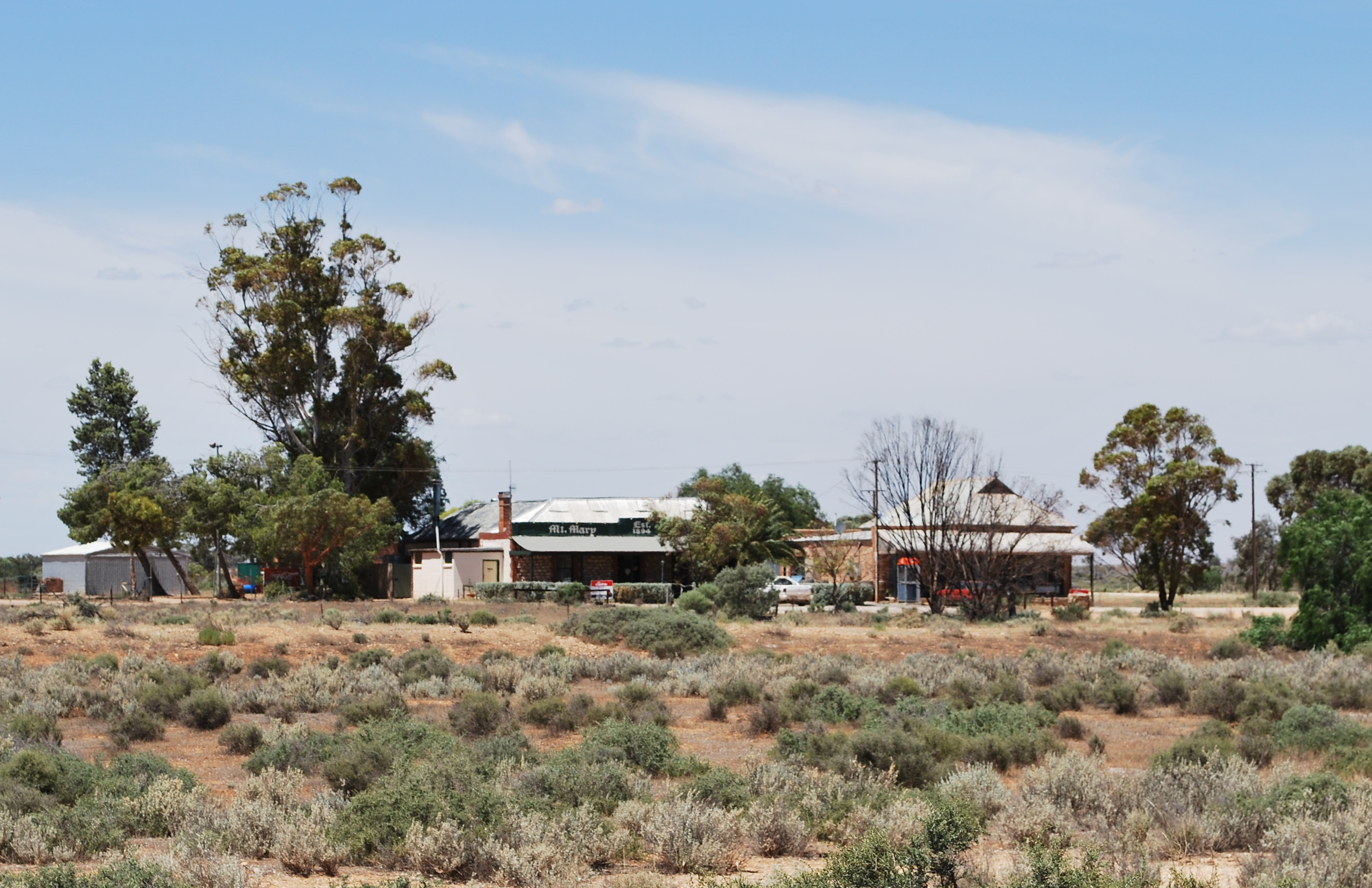
- Mount Mary Hotel

- Coordinates: 34°06′28″S 139°26′16″E
- Country: Australia
- State: South Australia
- Region: Murray and Mallee
- LGA: Mid Murray Council
- Location: 24 km (15 mi) SW of Morgan; 35 km (22 mi) NE of Eudunda
- Established: 24 January 1884 (town); 27 March 2003 (locality)

Government
  - State electorate: Chaffey
  - Federal division: Barker
- Elevation: 95 m (312 ft)

Population
  - Total: 36 (SAL 2021)
- Time zone: UTC+9:30 (ACST)
  - Summer (DST): UTC+10:30 (ACST)
- Postcode: 5374
- County: Eyre
- Mean max temp: 21.1 °C (70.0 °F)
- Mean min temp: 9.3 °C (48.7 °F)
- Annual rainfall: 448.6 mm (17.66 in)
Localities around Mount Mary
Beatty	Beatty	Eba
Bower	Mount Mary	Eba
Brownlow	Brownlow; Blanchetown	Blanchetown

Mount Mary, formerly known as Krichauff (German: [ˈkʁɪçʔaʊf]) and later as Beatty, is a small town on the Thiele Highway between Eudunda and Morgan in South Australia. It was also served by the Morgan railway line from 1878 until 1969 and is named for the Mount Mary railway station on that line.

Despite the town's name, the terrain is essentially flat, and is believed to have been a corruption of Mound Mary. The town was originally surveyed in 1883 and named Krichauff in 1884, after the Hundred of Krichauff which in turn was named for Friedrich Krichauff. The name was changed from a name of enemy origin in 1918 to Beatty (along with the name of the hundred) then again in 1940 to Mount Mary to match the name of the railway station. Beatty remains the name of the locality covering the northern half of the hundred of Beatty.

Mount Mary School opened as the Krichauff School in 1886. It was renamed Mount Mary in 1896, and temporarily closed from 1909 to 1913. The school closed permanently in 1956.

Mount Mary still has a hotel serving the community and travellers, but little other business remains other than farming. The town contains ten homes, the pub, and a working telephone box.

Mount Mary is located within the federal division of Barker, the state electoral district of Chaffey and the local government area of the Mid Murray Council.
