= Frankton, South Australia =

Coordinates: 34°17′S 139°13′E

Frankton South Australia
- Population: 15 (SAL 2021)
- Postcode(s): 5374
- LGA(s): Regional Council of Goyder; Mid Murray Council
- State electorate(s): Stuart
- Federal division(s): Grey; Barker
Localities around Frankton:
Dutton	Neales Flat	Brownlow
Dutton	Frankton	Steinfeld
Dutton	Dutton	Dutton East

Frankton is a rural locality in the Mid North region of South Australia, situated in the Regional Council of Goyder and Mid Murray Council. The section within the Goyder council was established in August 2000, when boundaries were formalised for the "long established local name"; the section within the Mid Murray council was added in March 2003. It is believed to be named after the son of two early residents, Mr. and Mrs. Rice.

Frankton School opened in 1884 and closed in 1938. A separate school, Dutton North, existed on the Levi's Water Hole property near the boundary with Dutton, from 1914 to 1927.

Frankton Post Office opened on 1 September 1882, was downgraded to a receiving office in January 1910, was upgraded again on 1 July 1927, and closed on 30 November 1930.

It had a Congregational Church congregation in the 1880s; it did not have a church and met in parishioners' houses.
