= Hundred of Neales =

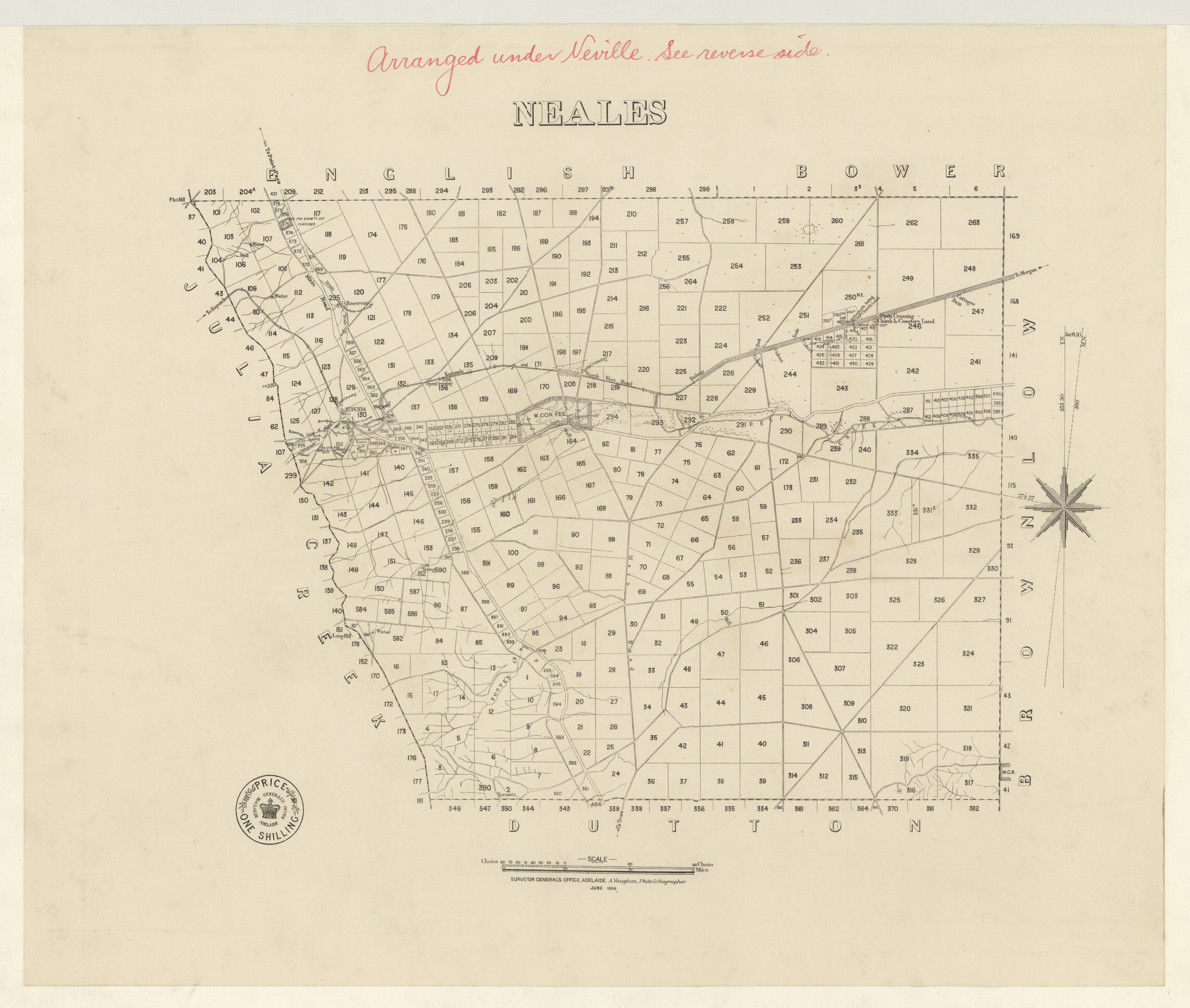
Hundred of Neales, 1896

The Hundred of Neales is a hundred and a locality within the County of Eyre, South Australia.

The main towns of the hundred are Eudunda and Sutherlands.

== Declaration of Hundred ==
In the South Australian Government Gazette of 12 July 1866, a special proclamation was made by Sir Dominick Daly, Governor of South Australia. It read as follows:

"WHEREAS by an Act of Parliament of South Australia, passed in a Session held in the twenty-fourth and twenty-fifth years of Her Majesty's reign, intituled "An Act to declare the powers of the Governor with reference to constituting Counties and Hundreds," and being No. 6 of 1861, the Governor is empowered, by Proclamation in the South Australian Government Gazette, to constitute Counties and Hundreds, and to define the boundaries thereof: And whereas it is deemed necessary and expedient that the portions of the County of Eyre, in the Province aforesaid, hereinafter particularly described, shall respectively be created Hundreds of the said Province, as hereinafter mentioned: Now therefore I, the Governor-in-Chief aforesaid, in the name and on behalf of Her Most Gracious Majesty the Queen, by virtue of the powers and authorities to me confided, do, by this my Proclamation, declare and appoint that the several settled portions of territory hereinafter mentioned, situate in and being portions of the County of Eyre aforesaid, shall, from and after the fifteenth day of September next ensuing, be, and I do hereby constitute the same Hundreds of the said Province, by the names, descriptions, and definitions of boundaries, hereinafter fully set forth, and as the same are delineated on the public maps deposited in the Surveyor-General's office in Adelaide, in the Province aforesaid, that is to say –

COUNTY OF EYRE.

Hundred of Neales. – Bounded on the south by the north boundary of the Hundred of Dutton; on the east by the production north of the east boundary of the Hundred of Dutton, to a point true east of Flat Hill Trigonometrical Station; on the north by a line starting from the last-mentioned point, and running true west to Flat Hill Trigonometrical Station; on the west by the boundary dividing the Counties of Eyre and Light.”
