= Steinfeld, South Australia =

Steinfeld
- Town
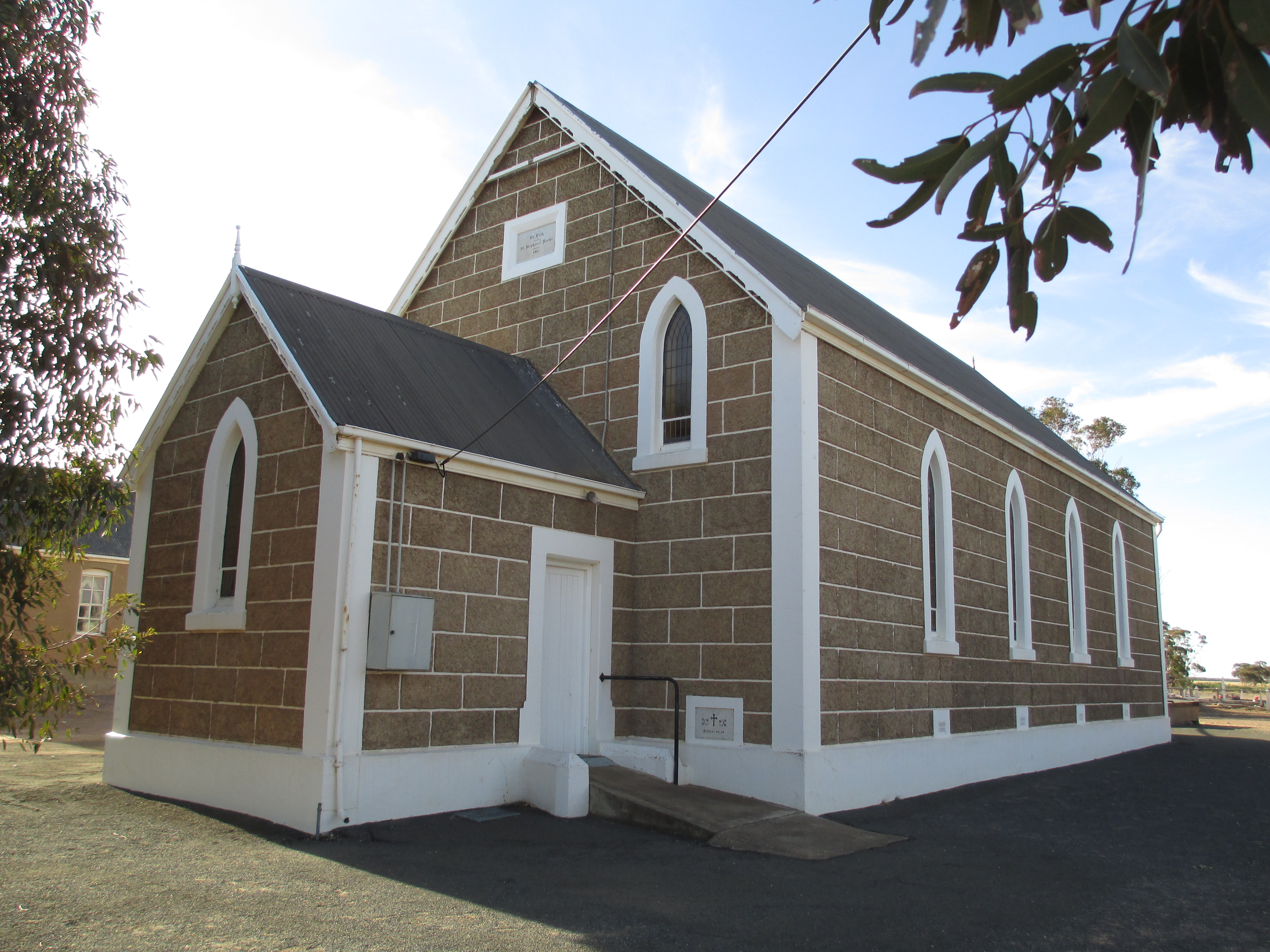
- St Stephen's Lutheran Church, Steinfeld

- Coordinates: 34.347280°S 139.301960°E
- Country: Australia
- State: South Australia
- LGA: Mid Murray Council and Regional Council of Goyder

Government
  - State electorate: Stuart
  - Federal division: Barker

Population
  - Total: 30 (SAL 2021)
- Postcode: 5356
Localities around Steinfeld
Frankton	Brownlow	Blanchetown
Dutton East	Steinfeld	Blanchetown
Truro	Annadale	Blanchetown

Steinfeld (German: [ˈʃtaɪ̯nˌfɛlt]), formerly known as Stonefield, is a locality in South Australia on the plains east of the Mount Lofty Ranges, and north of the Sturt Highway. The village of Steinfeld was established in the 19th century. It was renamed to Stonefield in 1918 as many places with German or German-sounding names were changed around World War I. The name reverted to Steinfeld in 1986.

The Steinfeld Lutheran congregation was established in 1882, and met in a home until it built its own building in 1890. The congregation met in this building until November 2016. A Lutheran school existed from the 1880s until 1917, when it was forcibly closed by the state government as a result of World War I. It was replaced by a public school in 1917, which operated until 1969. German was the predominant language in the area of the early days of the school, which posed challenges for teachers dealing with children with a poor grasp of English.

In 1945, it was reported that the Automobile Association had erected signs on the Blanchetown–Truro road (now the Sturt Highway) indicating that one of the nearest public telephones was at Stonefield.

The main part of the bounded locality now known as Steinfeld, including the original village, is in the Mid Murray Council. The northwestern corner of the locality is in the Regional Council of Goyder. That corner is also in the federal Division of Grey, rather than the Division of Barker like the rest of the locality.

The Barossa Valley Gliding Club and Adelaide University Gliding club share an airfield at Steinfeld.
