= Sandleton, South Australia =

Sandleton
- Town
- Coordinates: 34.46°S 139.36°E
- Country: Australia
- State: South Australia
- LGA: Mid Murray Council
- Location: 15 km (9.3 mi) north of Sedan

Government
  - State electorate: Stuart
  - Federal division: Barker

Population
  - Total: 20 (SAL 2021)
- Postcode: 5356
Localities around Sandleton
	Annadale
Truro	Sandleton	Blanchetown
	Sedan	Fisher

Sandleton is a locality and former town in South Australia. It is located on the plains on the eastern side of the Mount Lofty Ranges. The current boundaries for the locality were created in 2003 for the long-established name of the area.

== History ==
The Sandleton area was first known as part of a pastoral run named Sandalwood. This was broken up for closer settlement in the 1870s. A congregation of the Evangelical Lutheran Synod formed in 1880, with the St Paul's church and school built in 1881. The post office also opened in 1881. After upheaval in the Lutheran Church, the Pilgrim congregation separated from St Paul's and established its own church, school and cemetery in 1895.

A government school also opened in 1909, which operated intermittently until 1941. A new Pilgrim Church building was erected in 1914, and operated until 1960, with the last wedding held in 1947.

== Transport ==
The main route through the locality is Halfway House Road which runs from the Sturt Highway through Annadale and Sandleton to Sedan. It is part of the heavy vehicle detour route D1 used if either the Blanchetown Bridge or Swanport Bridge over the Murray River are unavailable for an extended time, or part of the South Eastern Freeway. This road is also part of the route from Murray Bridge to Burra with potential for the route to be upgraded to become a road freight bypass of Adelaide.

In 1945, it was reported that the Automobile Association had erected signs on the Blanchetown–Truro road (now the Sturt Highway) indicating that one of the nearest public telephones was at Sandleton.
