= Truro, South Australia =

Truro
- Town
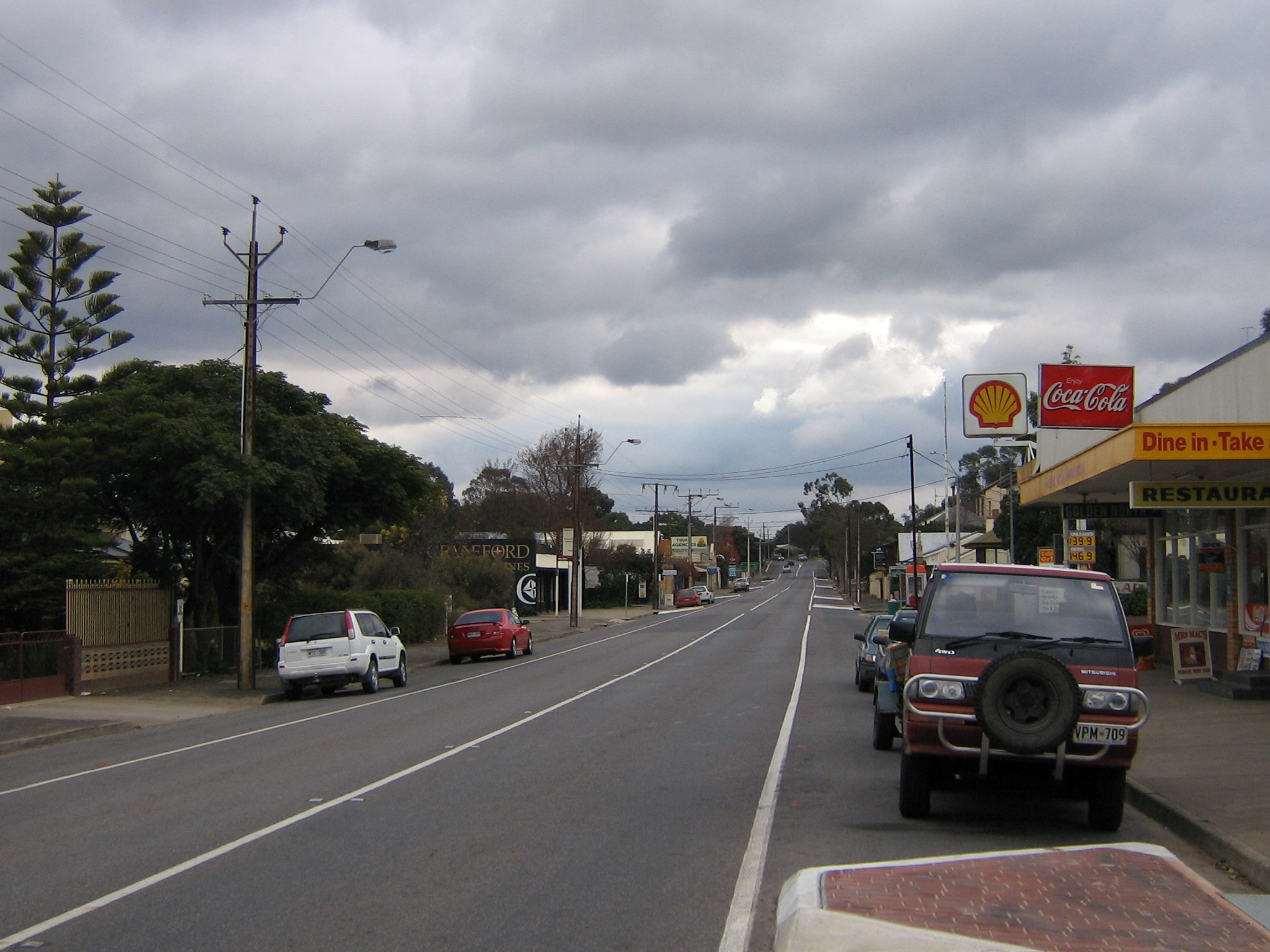
- The Sturt Highway, the main street of Truro, (looking west towards the Barossa Valley and Adelaide)

- Coordinates: 34°24′0″S 139°07′0″E
- Country: Australia
- State: South Australia
- LGAs: Mid Murray Council; Light Regional Council
- Location: 80 km (50 mi) North-east of Adelaide; 14 km (8.7 mi) NE of Nuriootpa
- Established: 1847 (town); 16 March 2000 (locality)

Government
  - State electorate: Stuart
  - Federal division: Barker

Population
  - Total: 523 (2021 census)
- Postcode: 5356
Localities around Truro
St Kitts	Dutton	Dutton East, Steinfeld
Ebenezer	Truro	Annadale, Sandleton
Stockwell	Keyneton, Moculta	Sedan, Towitta

Truro (postcode 5356, altitude 311m) is a town in South Australia, 80 km northeast of Adelaide. It is situated in an agricultural and pastoral district on the Sturt Highway, east of the Barossa Valley, where the highway crosses somewhat lofty and rugged parts of the Mount Lofty Ranges. At the 2021 census, Truro had a population of 523.

Truro is in the Mid Murray Council local government area, the South Australian House of Assembly electoral district of Schubert and the Australian House of Representatives Division of Barker.

== History ==
The town was established on Truro Creek (White Hut Creek) in 1848 by John Howard Angas, the son of George Fife Angas who had bought the land in 1842. The survey was conducted by Thomas Burr, assisted by his (eventual) son in law Frederick Sinnett, during a period when both were freed from their usual commitments in order to pursue private contracts.

It is named after the city of Truro in Cornwall, United Kingdom. It is somewhat uncertain whether the name Truro was given by Angas, or the first settlers in the town, but with the Wheal Barton mine nearby, many of those settlers were Cornish miners, so it is quite likely that if they were not the namers of the town, they were certainly the inspiration thereof. The township of Barton was also nearby, however that soon became a part of Truro.

It was formerly the seat of its own municipality, the District Council of Truro, from 1876 to 1991.

== Heritage listings ==
Truro has a number of heritage-listed sites, including:

- Baldon Road: Baldon Homestead Complex
- 37 Moorundie Street: Former Truro Police Station and Cells
- off Sturt Highway: Stone Wall
- off Sturt Highway: Accommodation Hill Spring and Pipeline Relics

== Industry ==
The first industry that European settlers introduced to Truro district, from the early 1840s, was pastoralism, primarily the grazing of sheep flocks, watched over by shepherds, on unfenced occupation licenses. Many of the picturesque dry stone walls so prevalent in the district date from this era.

Copper was discovered in 1846 and was mined at the Wheal Barton mine 2 km east of Truro from 1849 to 1889 and again between 1956 and 1972. These copper mines are what led to the survey and establishment of the town. The mine was established in 1849, and a church erected in the township by August 1850.

Truro was the terminus of the Truro railway line from its opening in 1917 until it ceased operating in the 1970s. The line was permanently closed in the 1980s.

Rainfall in Truro is lower than in the neighbouring Barossa Valley region. For this reason dry grain crop farming, mainly of wheat and barley, is more prevalent than viticulture.

There are two hotels in Truro. Truro also has several tourism offerings, in the form of the Pioneer Park, a specialist olive shop and several antique shops. The town also has service facilities for tourists and travellers along the Sturt Highway.

== Truro murders ==
During the 1970s, the town of Truro gained notoriety due to human remains being found scattered among nondescript Mallee scrub upon the arid Murray Plains near Sandleton. This became widely known as the Truro murders, one of the notable occurrences of serial killing in Australian history. Those human remains were actually found many tens of kilometres away from Truro but, despite these tragic crimes being unrelated to the Truro township, the broadcast media found 'Truro' to be a convenient label because it was the nearest town recognizable to the public.
