= Towitta, South Australia =

Towitta South Australia
- Coordinates: 34.53°S 139.255°E
- Population: 26 (SAL 2021)
- Established: 1 June 1876
- Postcode(s): 5353
- Location: 8 km (5 mi) northwest of Sedan
- LGA(s): Mid Murray Council
- State electorate(s): Chaffey
- Federal division(s): Barker
Localities around Towitta:
Truro
Keyneton	Towitta
		Sedan

Towitta is a locality in the Murray Mallee region of South Australia at the foot of the eastern side of the Mount Lofty Ranges. It is a rural community dominated by growing cereal grain crops. Its name is taken from Tewitty, the native name of a permanent spring nearby. The town was surveyed by H.C. Talbot in March 1876, and the Towitta public school was open from 1880 to 1942.

The murder of Bertha Schippan in January 1902 occurred on a farm to the north of the township of Towitta. Her sister Mary was later acquitted in Adelaide of the murder, which has never been officially solved. In 1984, the ABC produced a television film titled The Schippan Mystery covering the case.
