= Hundred of Hay =

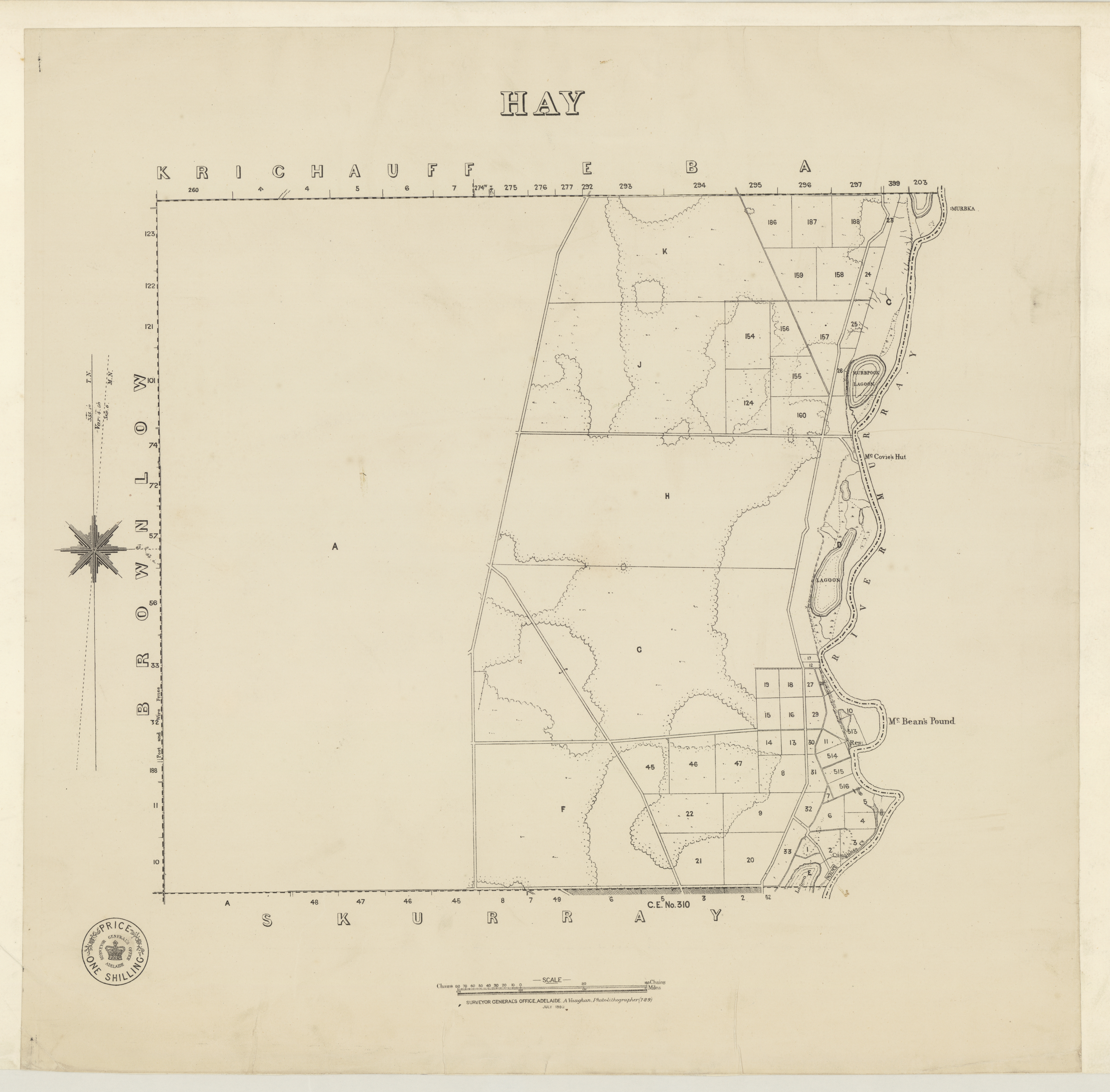
Hundred of Hay, 1892

The Hundred of Hay is a hundred within the County of Eyre, South Australia. The main town of the hundred is McBean Pound.
