= Mid Murray Council =

- Local government area
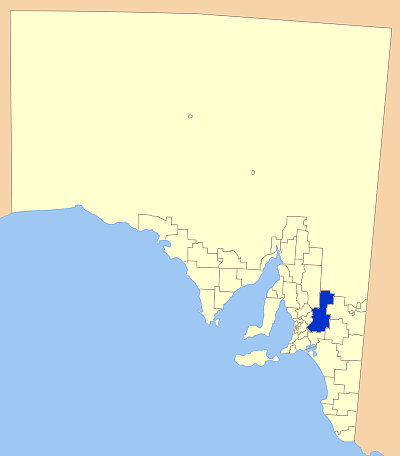
- Location of the Mid Murray Council in SA

- Interactive map of Mid Murray Council
- Coordinates: 34.6129°S 139.5525°E
- Country: Australia
- State: South Australia
- Region: Murray and Mallee
- Established: 1997
- Council seat: Mannum

Government
  - Mayor: Simone Bailey
  - State electorate: Chaffey, Schubert, Hammond, Stuart
  - Federal division: Barker

Area
  - Total: 7,957 km^{2} (3,072 sq mi)

Population
  - Total: 9,164 (LGA 2021)
- Website: Mid Murray Council
LGAs around Mid Murray Council
Goyder	Outback Communities Authority	Loxton Waikerie
Barossa	Mid Murray Council	Loxton Waikerie
Adelaide Hills / Mount Barker	Murray Bridge	Karoonda East Murray

The Mid Murray Council is a local government area in South Australia in the Murray and Mallee region of South Australia. The council spans the area from the Riverland through the Murraylands to the eastern slopes of the Mount Lofty Ranges. It includes 220 km of the Murray River. The council seat is at Mannum; it also maintains secondary offices at Cambrai and Morgan.

It was formed on 1 July 1997 from the amalgamation of the District Council of Mannum, the District Council of Morgan, the District Council of Ridley-Truro and part of the District Council of Mount Pleasant.

== Geography ==
The council's main centres include the river towns of Mannum, Swan Reach, Blanchetown and Morgan and the hills towns of Truro, Palmer and Tungkillo. It also includes a large number of rural localities, including Angas Valley, Annadale, Apamurra, Beatty, Beaumonts, Big Bend, Bolto, Brenda Park, Cadell, Cadell Lagoon, Cambrai, Caurnamont, Claypans, Cowirra, Dutton East, Eba, Fisher, Five Miles, Forster, Frahns, Frayville, Julanka Holdings, Keyneton, Lake Carlet, Langs Landing, Lindley, Maude, Marks Landing, McBean Pound, Morphetts Flat, Mount Mary, Milendella, Nildottie, North West Bend, Old Teal Flat, Pellaring Flat, Pompoota, Ponde, Port Mannum, Punthari, Punyelroo, Purnong, Rocky Point, Sanderston, Sandleton, Sedan, Stuart, Sunnydale, Teal Flat, Towitta, Walker Flat, Wombats Rest, Wongulla, Younghusband, Younghusband Holdings and Zadows Landing, and parts of Birdwood, Bower, Bowhill, Brownlow, Burdett, Caloote, Dutton, Eden Valley, Frankton, Mount Pleasant, Mount Torrens, Murbko, Rockleigh, Springton, Steinfeld, Taylorville, Tepko and Wall Flat.

== Councillors ==
Ward	Mayor/Councillor	Notes	Party Affiliation
Mayor	Simone Bailey	Labor Candidate for Hammond at 2026 State Election	Labor Party of South Australia
Eyre Ward	John Forrester	Deputy Mayor	
Eyre Ward	Jen Davis		
Murray Ward	Geoff Barber		
Murray Ward	Roslyn Schultz		
Shearer Ward	Kelly Gladigau		
Shearer Ward	Kirsty MacGregor		
Shearer Ward	Mandy Toczek McPeake		
Shearer Ward	Victoria Hammond		

Mid Murray Council has a directly-elected mayor.
