= Keyneton, South Australia =

Keyneton
- Town
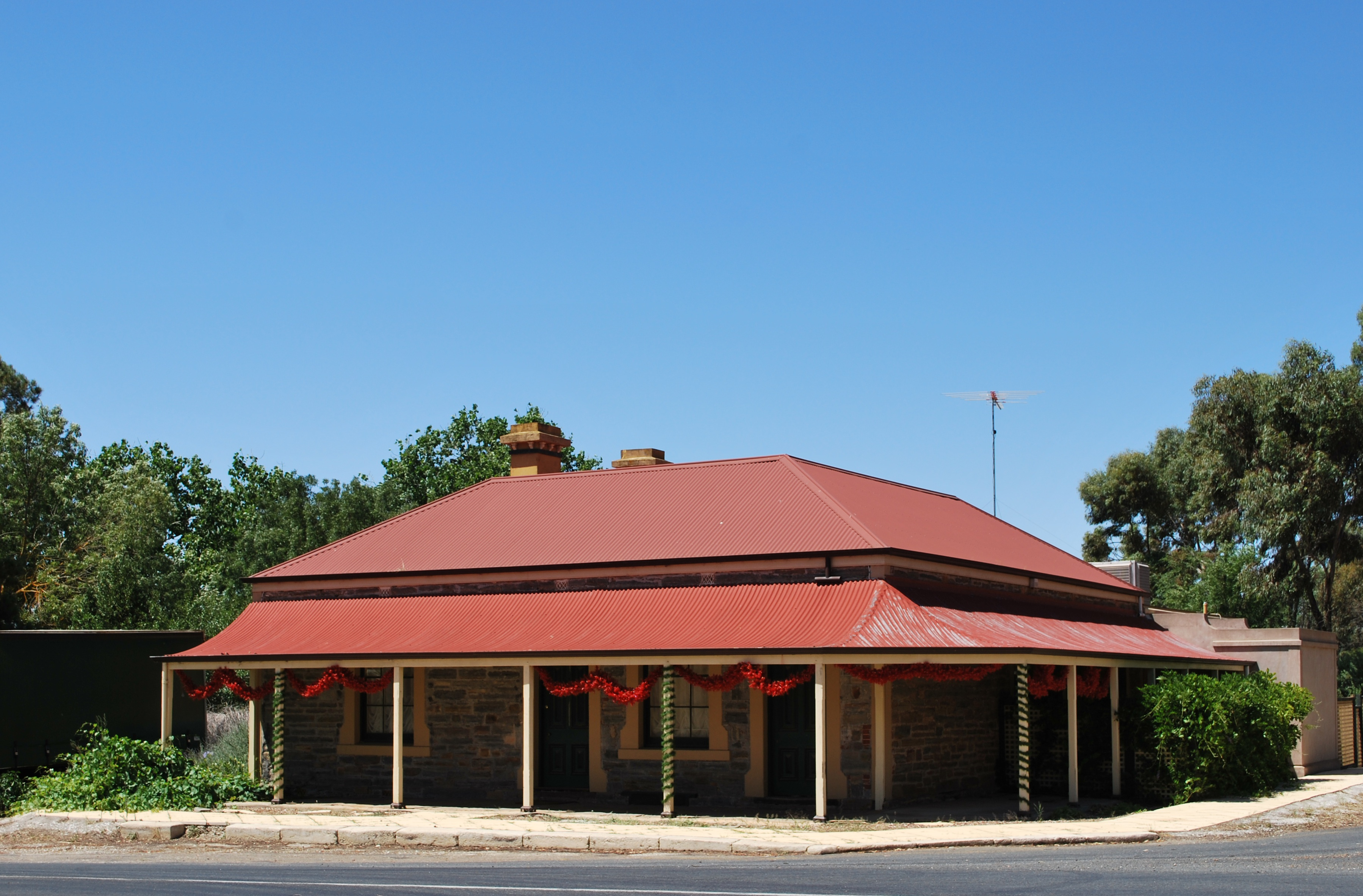
- A building in Keyneton

- Coordinates: 34°33′14″S 139°08′06″E
- Country: Australia
- State: South Australia
- LGA: Mid Murray Council
- Location: 82 km (51 mi) NE of Adelaide; 17 km (11 mi) SW of Nuriootpa, South Australia

Government
  - State electorate: Schubert
  - Federal division: Barker

Population
  - Total: 321 (SAL 2021)
- Postcode: 5353
Localities around Keyneton
| Moculta | Truro | Towitta |
| Angaston | Keyneton | Sedan |
| Flaxman Valley, Mount McKenzie | Eden Valley | Cambrai |

Keyneton is a locality in South Australia in the Mid Murray local government area on the eastern fringe of the Barossa, 11 kilometres from Angaston and 82 kilometres north-east of the state capital, Adelaide.

The district is renowned for primary production and viticulture, majestic gums and landscapes fenced with dry-stone walls and took the name ‘Keyneton’ from the property of pioneering sheep-breeding pastoralist, Joseph Keynes (1810-1883). The merino and wool enterprise continues under the stewardship of the sixth generation.

Decades before a township, the Keyneton name was adopted as the district name formally replacing the original nomenclature, North Rhine, when a post office opened in the school in 1861.

Located in Hundred of Jellicoe (formerly Hundred of North Rhine), the historic Engine House of the original bull pump stands as remnant of the former North Rhine Copper Mine on Pine Hut Road and the bridge over the North Rhine River (formerly Somme Creek) on the Sedan-Angaston Road are listed on the South Australian Heritage Register.

== Notable people ==
- Sarah Lindsay Evans (1816–1898), temperance activist
