= Hundred of Skurray =

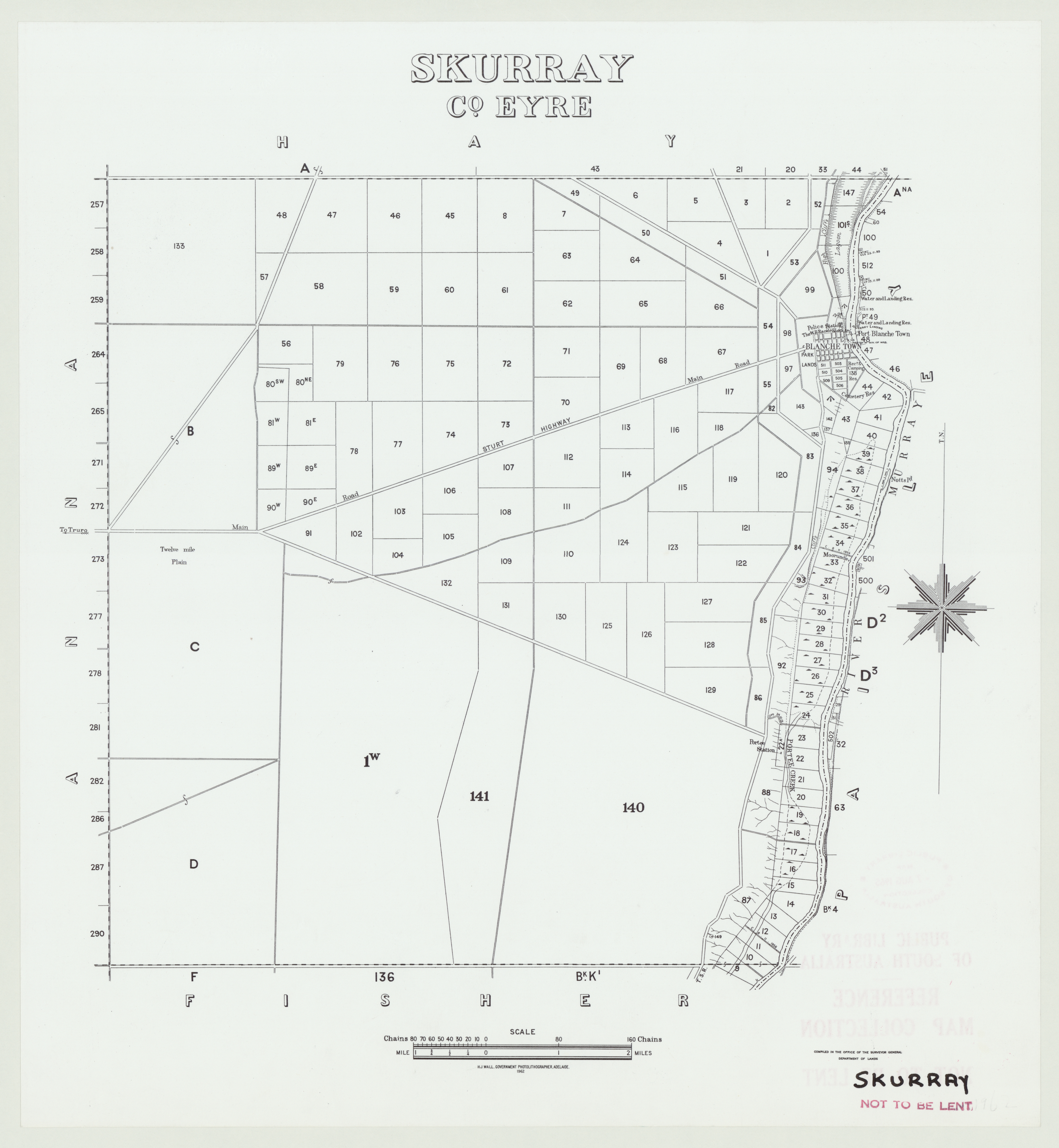
Hundred of Skurray, 1962

The Hundred of Skurray is a hundred within the County of Eyre, South Australia.

The main town of the hundred is Blanchetown.

== History ==
The traditional owners are the Ngarrindjeri people.

Since the 1850s, European settlement has spread from Blanchetown.
