= Hundred of Fisher =

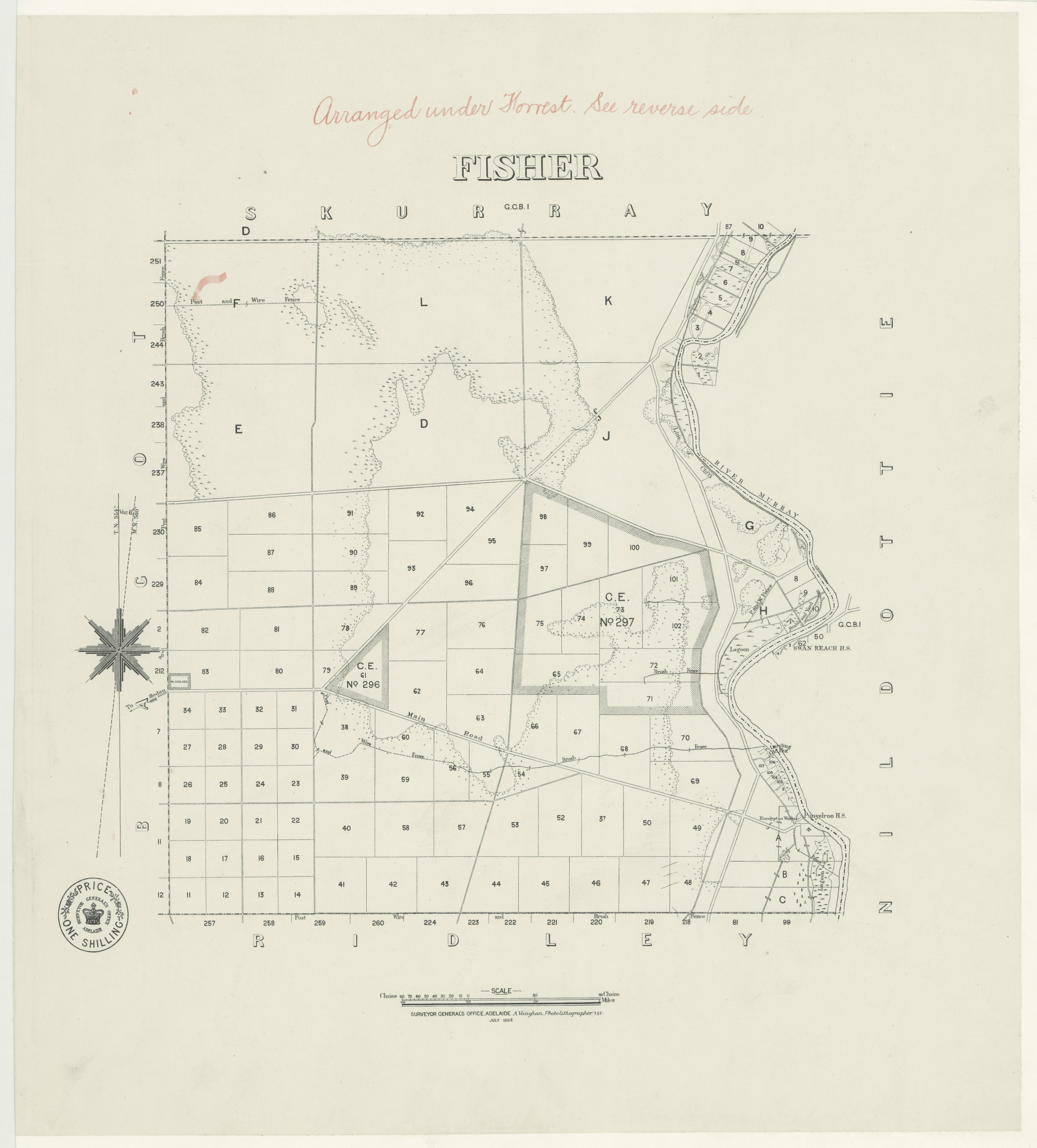
Hundred of Fisher, 1892

The Hundred of Fisher is a cadastral hundred of South Australia, founded in 1860. It is located at 34°36′16″S 139°36′6″E in the County of Eyre, South Australia. The main town of the hundred is Punyelroo, in the Mid Murray Council.

The Hundred is on the banks of the Murray River.
