= Sedan, South Australia =

Sedan
- Town
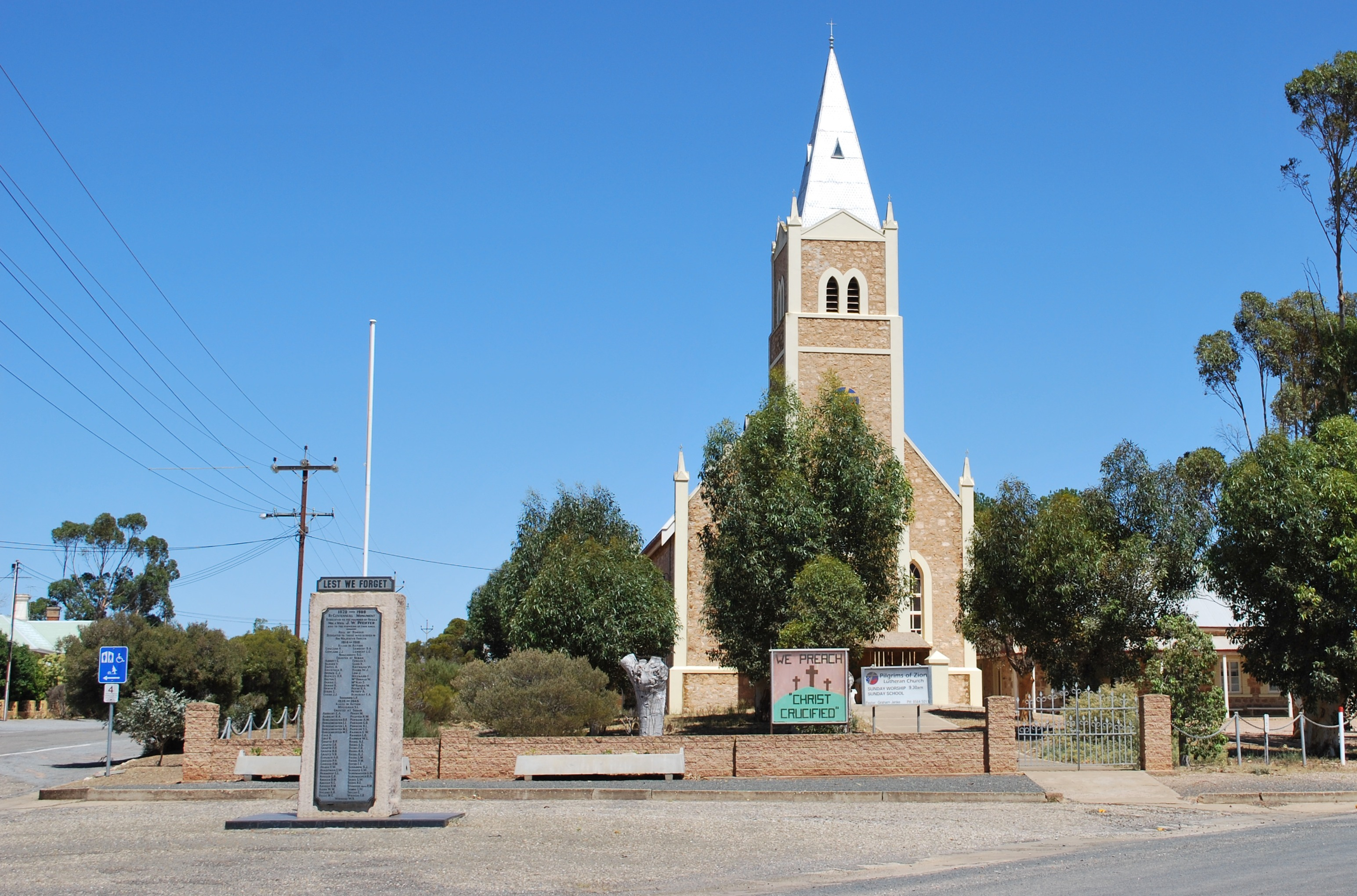
- Pilgrim of Zion Lutheran church. A war memorial is in the foreground

- Coordinates: 34°35′0″S 139°18′0″E
- Country: Australia
- State: South Australia
- LGA: Mid Murray Council

Government
  - State electorate: Chaffey
  - Federal division: Barker

Population
  - Total: 212 (SAL 2021)
- Postcode: 5353
- Website: Sedan
Localities around Sedan
Truro, Towitta	Sandleton	Blanchetown
Keyneton	Sedan	Fisher, Swan Reach
	Cambrai	Black Hill

Sedan is a rural town in South Australia. It is located about 100 kilometres east of Adelaide and about 20 kilometres west of the Murray River. It is located on the dry eastern side of the Mount Lofty Ranges.

== Overview ==
Sedan used to be the terminus of the South Australian Railways' Sedan line, which opened on 13 October 1919, and was curtailed to Cambrai in 1964.

Sedan is at the junction of the Stott Highway which connects the Barossa Valley on the west to the River Murray and Riverland on the east, and Halfway House Road which provides a north–south heavy vehicle route between the Sturt Highway and Princes Highway on the plains to the east of the Mount Lofty Ranges.

Surrounded by dry-stone walls built by early settlers, the historic town of Sedan is home to many 19th century buildings that are in excellent condition.

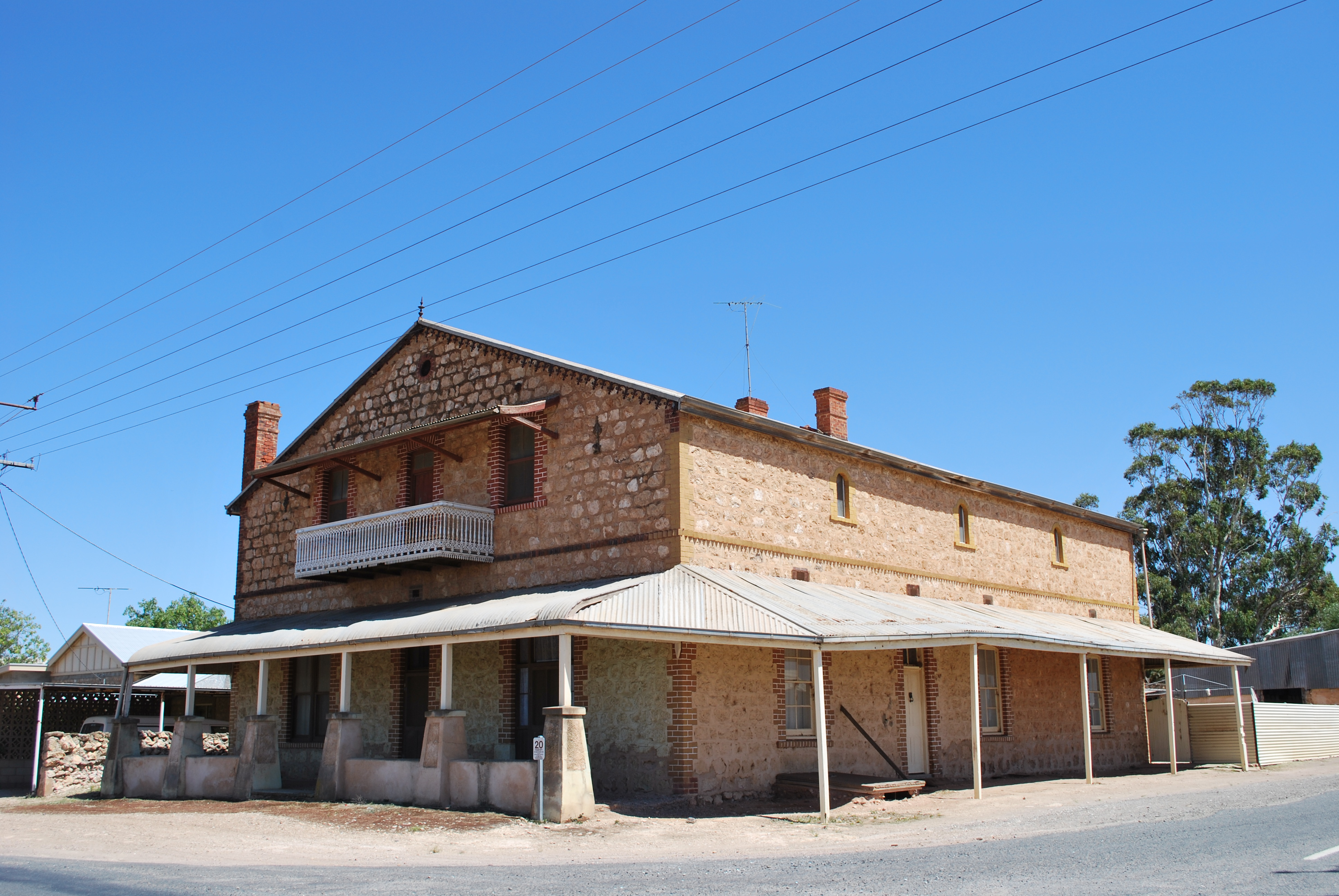
Old guest house building in Sedan

The Sedan Heritage Trail – available from the Sedan Hotel – is a good way to discover the town. Once a busy railway town, complete with steam flour mill and agricultural machinery factory, Sedan was settled in the 1850s by Lutheran Old High German settlers which fled Europe from religious persecution. The town was originally a private subdivision of Section 52. Some speculate the town is named for the Battle of Sedan in the Franco-Prussian War. which took place 1870. This war took place after the building of the township started and due to the persecution of Lutherans by the Prussian Emperor of the time; Given that the early German settlers came to Australia to be free from war and live peacefully, it is most likely the town was named after the settlers' ancestral homeland or a place of Asylum for religious refugees. Sedan in Europe, once German Lutheran was founded in 1424 and in the sixteenth century, became an official asylum for the Protestant émigrés (Lutheran Refugees) from the religious wars, annexed to France in 1642. These refugees were known as Huguenots. The Lutheran church at the center of the town opened in 1873. Due to speculations surrounding their German heritage. The founding father of the town donated the buildings to the Lutheran church and community.

When the amalgamated District Council of Keyneton and Swan Reach was established in 1933, Sedan was chosen to be the seat of council. Later the council name was changed to reflect the seat, becoming the District Council of Sedan.

== Pine Hut Creek ==
Pine Hut Creek and Pine Hut Plain are historic names for areas to the south of the township in the locality of Sedan. The creek flows from the eastern side of the Mount Lofty Ranges to the Murray River. There was once a Congregational Church school which closed in 1880 and government school from 1900 to 1910. There is a small cemetery no longer used.
