= Blanchetown =

- Town
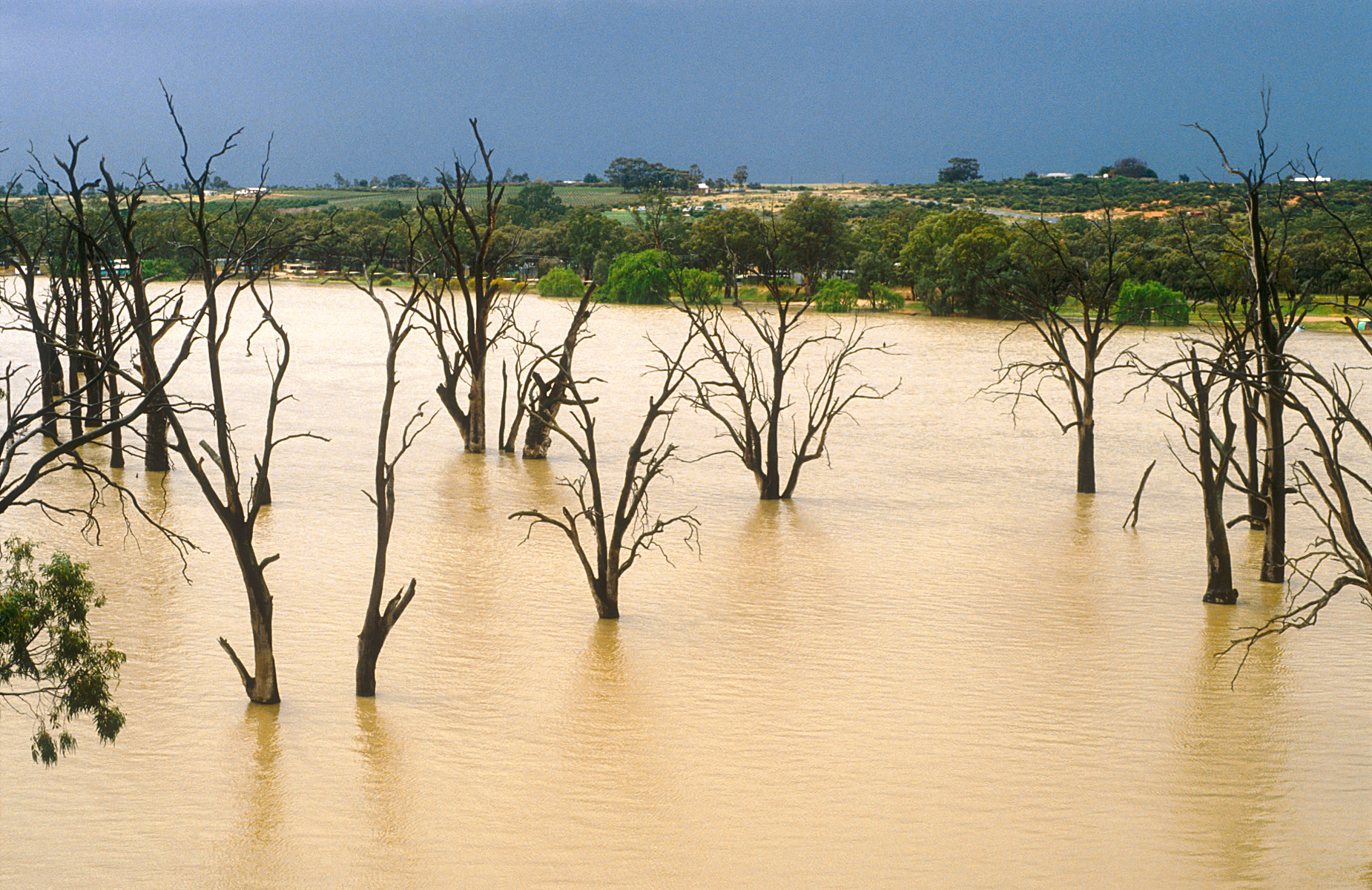
- Dead gum trees in the Murray River near Blanchetown in 1989

- Coordinates: 34°21′08″S 139°36′29″E
- Country: Australia
- State: South Australia
- LGA: Mid Murray Council
- Location: 130 km (81 mi) northeast of Adelaide city centre
- Established: 1855

Government
  - State electorate: Chaffey
  - Federal division: Barker

Population
  - Total: 247 (UCL 2021)
- Postcode: 5357
Localities around Blanchetown
Mount Mary	Mount Mary; Eba; Morgan	Murbko
Brownlow; Steinfeld, Annadale; Sandleton	Blanchetown	Murbko; McBean Pound; Murbko; Paisley
Sedan	Fisher	Paisley

Blanchetown is a small township in South Australia, on the (west) bank of the Murray River, 130 kilometres (81 mi) northeast of Adelaide. The Blanchetown Bridge is the westernmost (and farthest downstream) of the four crossings of the Sturt Highway over the Murray River. During the nineteenth century it was an important transportation centre on the lower Murray. In the early 21st century, Blanchetown has been described as "a strange mixture of historic buildings and temporary shacks built by holidaymakers on the banks of the river". Blanchetown is widely regarded as the entrance to the Riverland district.

== History ==
Blanchetown is in the traditional lands of the Ngarrindjeri people. Blanchetown was originally surveyed in October 1855 as Blanche Town. It was named after Lady Blanche MacDonnell, the wife of the Governor of South Australia, Sir Richard MacDonnell. The Governor selected the site personally, to replace an earlier settlement of Murrundi (or Moorundee) - five kilometres downstream - which was subject to flooding. Murrundi had been chosen as the base of the Protector of Aborigines by Edward John Eyre since 1841.

There had been a ferry crossing at Blanchetown since 1869 (private before 1879, then government-run). In February 1876 Blanchetown was described as a "small but ambitious settlement, containing a dozen houses, and having a population of about 50 people". The buildings in the township were "substantially built of a stone quarried in the neighbourhood". The post and telegraph office, the hotel and store were described as "the main buildings".

When land was first sold at Blanche Town it was on the "understanding that a railway should be made there, and some of the allotments consequently fetched as much as £1,200 per acre". By 1876, however, it was apparent that the railway would by-pass Blanchetown. It was reported that "the inhabitants regard the non-fulfillment of this promise as savouring of repudiation". The railway line connecting Adelaide with the town of Morgan, upstream of Blanchetown, was opened in 1878. This development adversely affected the progress of Blanchetown and resulted in a decline of steamer traffic to the town.

== Heritage listings ==
Blanchetown has a number of heritage-listed sites, including:

- Adams Street has the Blanchetown Hotel
- At 28-30 Egerton Street is the Blanchetown Post Office
- Off Swan Reach-Blanchetown Road are the Moorundie Settlement Ruins
- William R. Randell Lock and Weir (Lock No. 1, see below)

== Industry and amenities ==
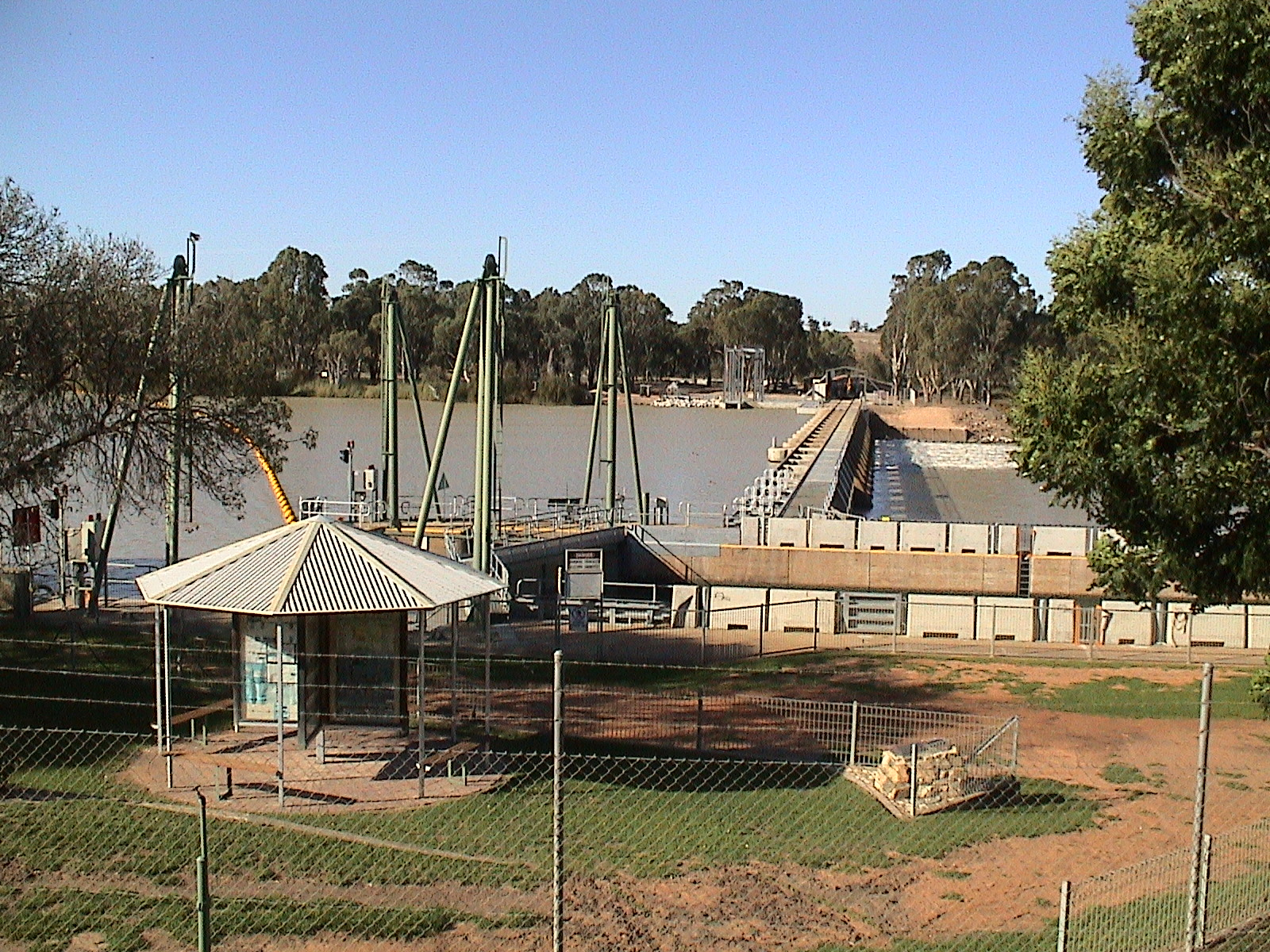
Lock 1 and weir at Blanchetown

Blanchetown is north of Goyder's Line, and so the land around it is unsuitable for farming unless it is irrigated using water drawn from the Murray. Upstream of Blanchetown, land above the cliffs on the west bank is mostly used for sheep grazing, while land on the east bank is irrigated for citrus orchards.

The locality of Blanchetown includes the Brookfield Conservation Park west of the town and north of the Sturt Highway. It is an example of the mallee near Goyder's Line and a habitat for southern hairy-nosed wombats. The Advent Lutheran Church Blanchetown is actually in Paisley, a few hundred metres north of the eastern end of the bridge.

== Lock and weir ==
Lock 1 on the Murray River is at Blanchetown. It was the first of the 13 locks and weirs built on the Murray, and was completed in 1922. The lock chamber is approximately 56 by 275 feet (17 by 84 metres). The original purpose was to facilitate navigation for trade along the Murray, but by the time the weirs had been built, trade was declining. The primary purposes now are for recreational boating and to maintain water levels for irrigation. The pool upstream of the weir is 3.6 metres above sea level. It is 274 kilometres (170 mi) from the Murray Mouth.

== Bridge ==
A bridge to replace the 2 ferries at Blanchetown was constructed, starting in March 1962, and opened in April 1964. Its length is 440 metres; the decking is 13 metres wide. The designer was Donovan Lee & Partners of London; the builder was A.W. Baulderstone Ltd. of Adelaide. It was the first major prestressed concrete highway bridge in South Australia. In the 1990s it was found to not be structurally sound enough to safely carry B-double trucks. Until a new bridge could be built, these were diverted from near Monash via Morgan and Eudunda to rejoin the highway at Gawler, thus travelling further but avoiding the Kingston and Blanchetown bridges. The replacement bridge was completed in November 1998. The original bridge remains available for pedestrians and cyclists.

== Governance ==
Blanchetown is in the Mid Murray Council local government area, the South Australian House of Assembly electoral district of Chaffey and the Australian House of Representatives Division of Barker.

== See also ==
- List of crossings of the Murray River
