= Hundred of Noarlunga =

Noarlunga South Australia
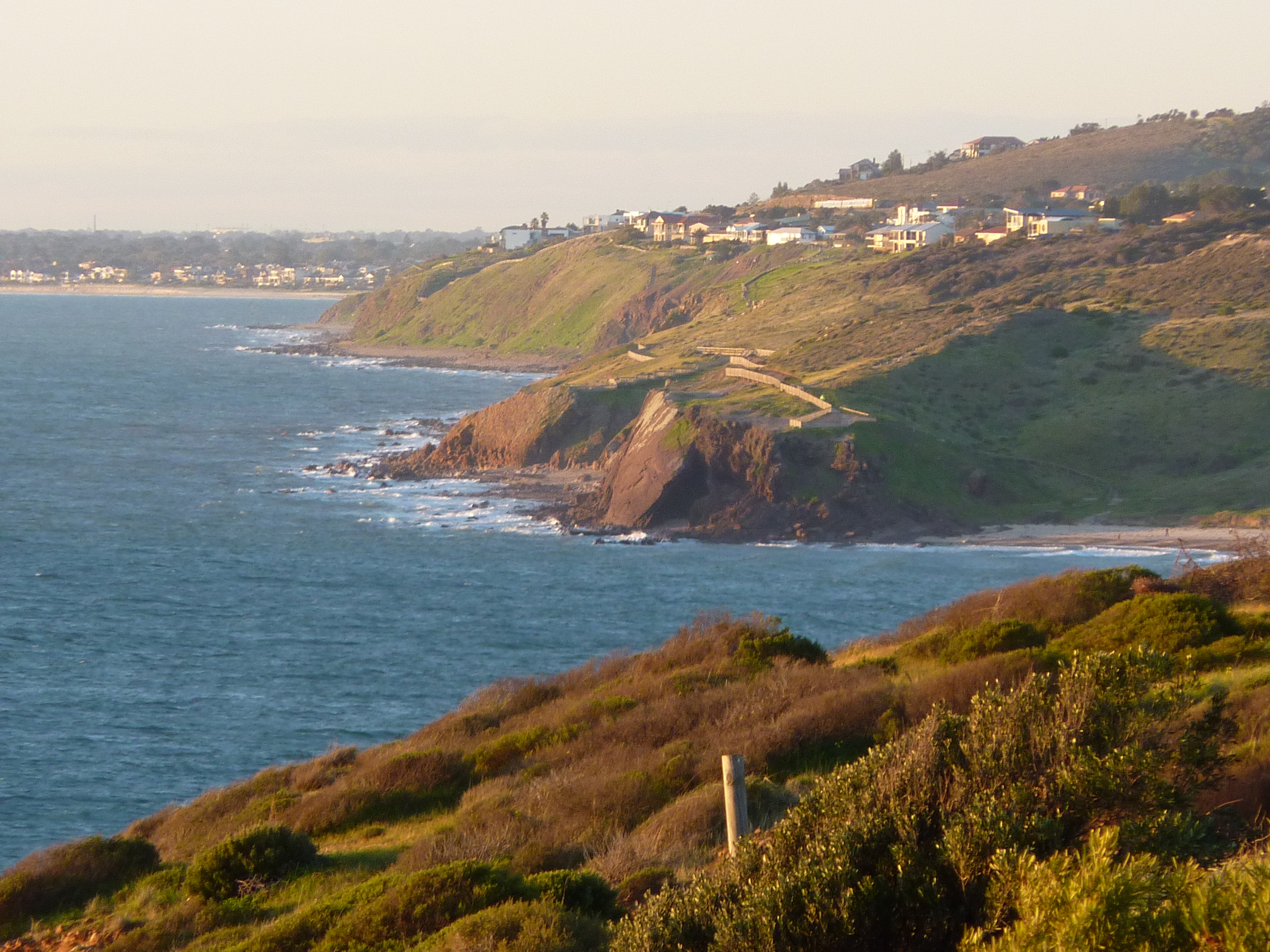
- Hallett Cove is halfway along the hundred coastline.

- Coordinates: 35.078°S 138.631°E
- Established: 1846
- Area: 120 km^{2} (46.3 sq mi)
- County: Adelaide
Lands administrative divisions around Noarlunga:
Gulf St Vincent	Adelaide	Onkaparinga
Gulf St Vincent	Noarlunga	Kuitpo
Gulf St Vincent	Willunga	Kuitpo

The Hundred of Noarlunga is a cadastral unit of hundred in South Australia covering the far south-western Adelaide metropolitan area south and west of the Sturt River and north and west of the Onkaparinga River. It is one of the eleven hundreds of the County of Adelaide stretching from Glenelg in the northwest to Port Noarlunga in the southwest; and spanning inland between the Sturt and Onkaparinga to Bridgewater in the Adelaide foothills. It was named in 1846 by Governor Frederick Robe, Noarlunga being likely derived from 'nurlongga', an indigenous word referring to the curvature in the Onkaparinga River at Old Noarlunga, dubbed Horseshoe Bend by European settlers.

== Etymology ==
Contemporary Australian linguists believe the name "Noarlunga" is derived from the Kaurna nurlo (corner/curve/bend) + ngga (place). Early South Australian Christian missionaries, Christian Teichelmann and Clamor Schürmann, recorded this meaning of the word in 1840, among about 2000 translations of local Indigenous words.

The Australasian Biospecimen Network Association (ABNA) records Noarlunga as meaning "fishing place", as suggested by various early South Australian historians and repeated by some official sources, such as the City of Onkaparinga and the state government land titles office. However, from the 2010s, expert opinion has favoured the "curve" translation.

== Local government ==
In the north of the hundred, the District Council of Brighton (later called the City of Marion) was established at Brighton and Marion in 1853. The Town of Glenelg municipality was established at Glenelg in 1855, closely followed by the Town of Brighton (by secession from the district council) in 1858. In 1886 the district council changed its name to District Council of Marion to avoid confusion with the Town of Brighton. The two seaside township councils governed the northern coastal tip of the hundred until 1997 when they merged to form the City of Holdfast Bay. Beside them, Marion council gained city status in the 1940s as the Adelaide metropolis extended southwards and urbanisation took hold throughout the entire council area.

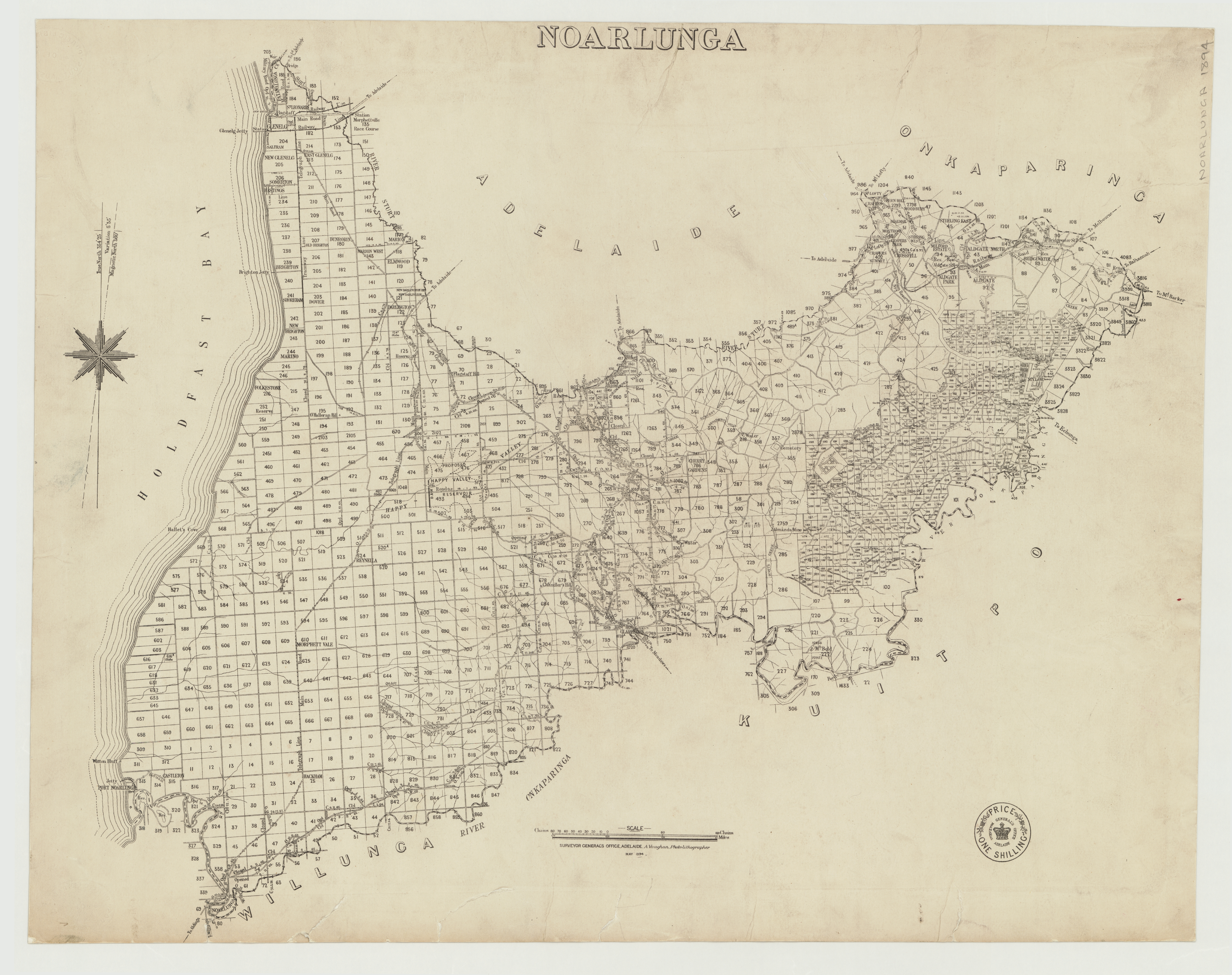
Hundred of Noarlunga, 1894

In the south of the hundred the District Council of Morphett Vale was established on 10 November 1853. Seated at Morphett Vale it initially the coastal strip between the southern boundary of Marion council and the Onkaparinga River. In 1856 the District Council of Noarlunga was established from parts of Morphett Vale, north of the Onkaparinga, and Willunga council, south of the river. In 1932 Morphett Vale council was dissolved, and the lands were added to Noarlunga council.

In the east of the hundred the District Council of Clarendon was established along with the earliest district councils in the state in 1853. The District Council of Echunga had also been established in 1853 governing a portion in the far east of the hundred and, in 1883, this part was severed along with the south-eastern fringe of the District Council of Mitcham to form the District Council of Stirling. In 1935 Clarendon council was dissolved with parts being annexed to Noarlunga, Willunga and Stirling councils, but the greater part being amalgamated with the council of Echunga, Kondoparinga and Macclesfield to form the new District Council of Meadows, later called the City of Happy Valley and seated at O'Halloran Hill.

In 1997 the Noarlunga council was amalgamated with Happy Valley and Willunga to form the City of Onkaparinga, uniting most of the south and east of the hundred under one local government. In the same year the Stirling council was amalgamated with other councils to the north to form the much larger Adelaide Hills Council.

The following local government areas of South Australia are situated inside (or largely inside) the bounds of the hundred as of 2017:

- City of Holdfast Bay
- City of Marion
- City of Onkaparinga (that part north of Onkaparinga River)
- Adelaide Hills Council (southern tip east of Cherry Gardens and Clarendon between the Sturt and Onkaparinga rivers to the South Eastern Freeway at Stirling and Bridgewater)

== See also ==
- Lands administrative divisions of South Australia
- Old Noarlunga, South Australia
- Port Noarlunga, South Australia
