= Hundred of Willunga =

Willunga
- Cadastral division
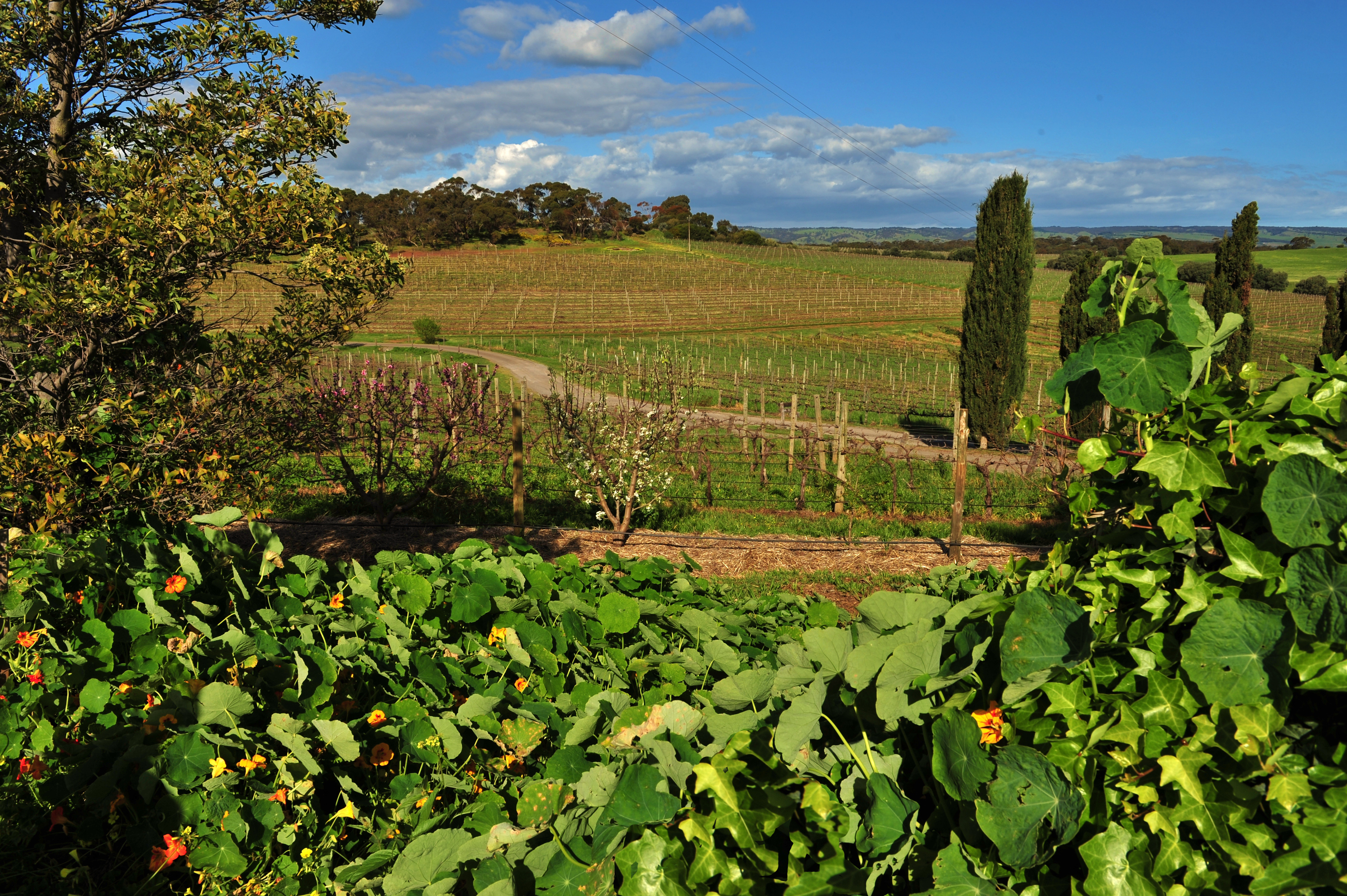
- Vines at Coriole Vineyard, McLaren Vale

- Coordinates: 35.24°S 138.53°E
- Country: Australia
- State: South Australia
- Established: 29 October 1846

Area
  - Total: 260 km^{2} (99 sq mi)
- County: Adelaide
Lands administrative divisions around Willunga
Gulf St Vincent	Noarlunga	Kuitpo
Gulf St Vincent	Willunga	Kuitpo
Myponga	Myponga	Myponga

The Hundred of Willunga is a cadastral unit of hundred covering the extreme south suburbs of the Adelaide metropolitan area. It is one of the eleven hundreds of the County of Adelaide. It was named in 1846 by Governor Frederick Robe probably deriving from a Kaurna/Ngarrindjeri place label willannga, meaning place of green trees.

The hundred is bounded on the north by the Onkaparinga River and includes part of the McLaren Vale wine region. The bounds of the Hundred of Willunga span the southern half of the contemporary City of Onkaparinga local government area, including localities south of the Onkaparinga and west of Kangarilla and Kuitpo.

== Local government ==
The District Council of Willunga was established in 1853 to govern the hundred. By 1856, residents on the northern boundary at Noarlunga had seceded from the council along with parts of Morphett Vale over the Onkaparinga River to form the District Council of Noarlunga. The following year, residents of Aldinga successfully lobbied for their own independent local governance and the District Council of Aldinga was formed. In 1932 Aldinga was dissolved and the land absorbed back into Willunga council. In 1997 Willunga council was amalgamated with Noarlunga and Happy Valley councils to the north to form the City of Onkaparinga, spanning both the Hundred of Willunga and Hundred of Noarlunga.

== Towns and other localities ==
The following Adelaide seaside suburbs and semi-urban localities are located within the hundred:

- Port Noarlunga South
- Seaford Meadows
- Seaford
- Moana
- Old Noarlunga (south of Onkaparinga River)
- Seaford Rise
- Seaford Heights
- Maslin Beach
- Port Willunga
- Aldinga Beach
- Sellicks Beach

The following semi-rural towns and localities are located within the hundred:

- Blewitt Springs
- McLaren Vale
- McLaren Flat
- Tatachilla
- The Range (north-western half)
- Aldinga
- Whites Valley
- Willunga
- Sellicks Hill
- Willunga South

== See also ==
- Lands administrative divisions of South Australia
