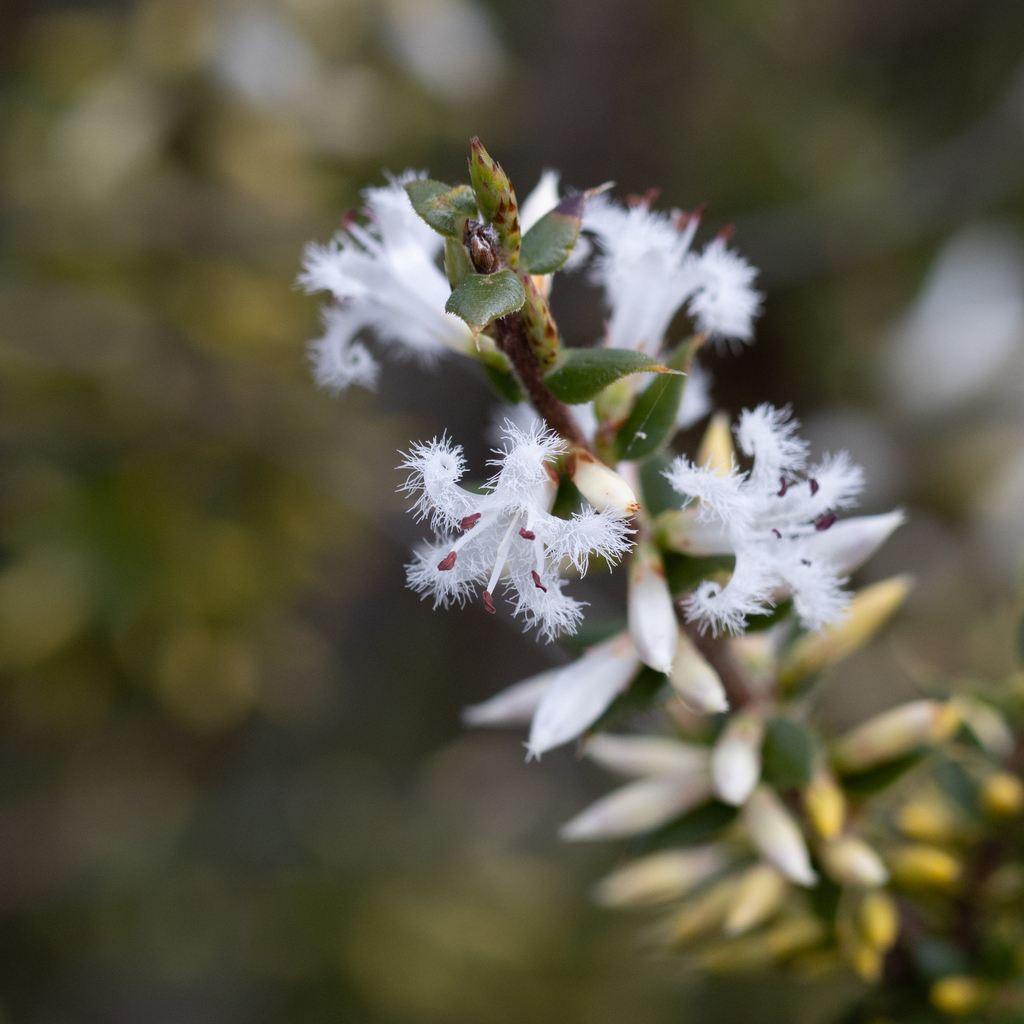
- In Cox Scrub Conservation Park

Scientific classification
- Kingdom: Plantae
- Clade: Tracheophytes
- Clade: Angiosperms
- Clade: Eudicots
- Clade: Asterids
- Order: Ericales
- Family: Ericaceae
- Genus: Styphelia
- Species: S. exarrhena

Binomial name
- Styphelia exarrhena (F.Muell.) F.Muell.

Synonyms
- Leucopogon exarrhenus F.Muell.; Leucopogon hirtellus F.Muell. ex Benth.; Leucopogon hirtellus var. glabrifolius J.M.Black; Styphelia hirtella (F.Muell. ex Benth.) F.Muell.; Styphelia pusilliflora F.Muell.

= Styphelia exarrhena =

Desert styphelia

Species of flowering plant

Styphelia exarrhena, commonly known as desert styphelia, is a species of flowering plant in the heath family Ericaceae and is endemic to southern continental Australia. It is an erect shrub with erect or spreading egg-shaped leaves, and cream-coloured, tube-shaped flowers arranged singly or in pairs in upper leaf axils.

== Description ==
Styphelia exarrhena is an erect shrub that typically grows to a height of 30–60 cm (12–24 in) and has downy branchlets. Its leaves are erect or spreading, egg-shaped, 3.2–9 mm (0.13–0.35 in) long and 1.4–4.5 mm (0.055–0.177 in) wide. The leaves are usually glabrous and have a small point on the tip. The flowers are arranged singly or in pairs in upper leaf axils and have egg-shaped bracts 0.7–1.2 mm (0.028–0.047 in) long and bracteoles 1.3–2 mm (0.051–0.079 in) long. The sepals are egg-shaped, 2.4–3.2 mm (0.094–0.126 in) long, the petal tube cream-coloured, 3.0–4.3 mm (0.12–0.17 in) long with lobes 3.2–5 mm (0.13–0.20 in) long and bearded. Flowering occurs from April to August and the fruit is a narrowly elliptic drupe about 2.5 mm (0.098 in) long.

== Taxonomy ==
This species was first formally described in 1859 by Ferdinand von Mueller, who gave it the name Leucopogon exarrhena in his Fragmenta Phytographiae Australiae. In 1867, von Mueller transferred the species to Styphelia as S. exarrhena in a later edition of the Fragmenta, and that name is accepted by Plants of the World Online. Styphelia exarrhena and S. adscendens are characterised by their stamens protruding from the petal tube.

== Distribution and habitat ==
Desert styphelia grows in mallee scrub, coastal shrublands and heath in sandy soil in the south-east of South Australia including on the Eyre Peninsula and Kangaroo Island, and in the Big Desert area of Victoria.

== Conservation status ==
Styphelia exarrhena is listed as "endangered" under the Victorian Government Flora and Fauna Guarantee Act.
