= District Council of Kondoparinga =

- Local government area
- Coordinates: 35°11′0″S 138°45′0″E
- Country: Australia
- State: South Australia
- Established: 1853
- Abolished: 1935
- Council seat: Meadows

Area (1935)
  - Total: 240 km^{2} (92 sq mi)
LGAs around District Council of Kondoparinga
| Clarendon | Stirling; Echunga | Macclesfield |
| Willunga | District Council of Kondoparinga | Onaunga; Strathalbyn |
| Myponga; Yankalilla | Port Elliot and Goolwa; Port Elliot | Bremer; Alexandrina |

The District Council of Kondoparinga was a local government area in South Australia from 1853 until 1935, at which point the council lands and resources formed the heart of the new District Council of Meadows.

== History ==
Kondoparinga was amongst the earliest group of district councils established in South Australia, being proclaimed on 22 October 1853, the same day as the adjacent Echunga, Macclesfield and Mount Barker councils.

The first councillors were George Vickery, John Thomas Scown, Duncan Cameron, Thomas Jones, and James Stone. The council seat was at Meadows in the north of the district.

Kondoparinga was abolished in March 1935, taking effect from 1 May that year, by enactment of the Local Government Areas (Re-arrangement) Acts 1929 and 1931. Most of Kondoparinga was amalgamated with most of Echunga, Clarendon and Macclesfield councils to form the new District Council of Meadows, so named for the council seat of the old Kondoparinga council. The remainder of Kondoparinga was annexed by the District Council of Strathalbyn.

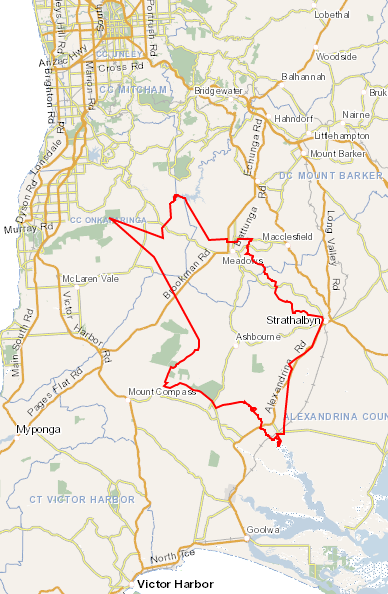
Approximate bounds of the Kondoparinga district in 1853, shown on a present-day road map with relation to Adelaide, to the north, and Victor Harbor, to the south

== Location ==
At its establishment, the council area comprised the Hundred of Kondoparinga as well as a central portion of the Hundred of Kuitpo.

The western boundary stretched northwards from Mount Magnificent south and north trig stations to Wickham Hill and the Onkaparinga River just north of Blewitt Springs.

The northern boundary stretched eastwards from Blewitt Springs to Mount Panorama trig station, north east to the Onkaparinga just west of the present-day Mount Bold Reservoir, east along the river to approximately the centre of the present-day reservoir, then south south east to a point about 2.7 km (1.7 mi) north-west of the Meadows town centre and from there generally eastwards to the hundred boundary about the same distance east of the township.

The eastern boundary followed the Hundred of Kondoparinga north east and south east boundary to just south of the township of Finniss and the south boundary followed the hundred's southern boundary.

The council lay either side of Bull Creek Road, in the south, and Dashwood Gully Road, the north, for much of their length, including within its bounds the towns of Ashbourne, Meadows and Finniss as well as the smaller settlements of Paris Creek, Bull Creek, Prospect Hill, Blackfellows Creek, McHarg Creek, the historic settlement of Dashwood Gully, and the localities of Mount Observation and Mount Magnificent on the southern boundary.

The council area also included the majority of Kuitpo Forest Reserve in the west, and present-day land reserves of Bullock Hill, Cox Scrub and Finniss Conservation Parks in the south.

== Chairmen ==
- Samuel Howard Ross (circa 1925 – circa 1935)
- James Nicol (circa 1918 – circa 1925)
