= Hundred of Kuitpo =

Kuitpo
- Cadastral division
- Coordinates: 35°10′10″S 138°43′12″E
- Country: Australia
- State: South Australia
- Established: 29 October 1846

Area
  - Total: 320 km^{2} (124 sq mi)
- County: Adelaide
Lands administrative divisions around Kuitpo
| Noarlunga | Onkaparinga | Kanmantoo |
| Willunga | Kuitpo | Macclesfield |
| Myponga | Nangkita | Kondoparinga |

The Hundred of Kuitpo is a cadastral unit of hundred in the Adelaide Hills. It is one of the 11 hundreds of the County of Adelaide. It was named in 1846 by Governor Frederick Robe and is presumed to be derived from an indigenous term ku-it-po, meaning reeds and referring to Blackfellow Creek in the contemporary locality of Yundi.

== History ==
Being in the County of Adelaide, the hundred was proclaimed in 1846 along with the earliest hundred proclamations in the state. The early local administration of the hundred was split in 1853 between four new district councils established within a few months of each other: the District Council of Willunga in the south west, the District Council of Kondoparinga in the centre, the District Council of Clarendon in the north west, and the District Council of Echunga in the north east. The latter three were amalgamated with much of the District Council of Macclesfield in 1935 to form the District Council of Meadows.

== Towns and localities ==
The following localities and towns of the Alexandrina Council area are situated inside (or largely inside) the bounds of the Hundred of Kuitpo:

- Kuitpo
- Blackfellows Creek
- The Range (eastern part)
- Montarra
- Dingabledinga
- Hope Forest
- Kyeema
- Kuitpo Colony
- Mount Magnificent (north western part)

The following localities and towns of the City of Onkaparinga are situated largely inside the bounds of the Hundred of Kuitpo:

- Clarendon (south of Onkaparinga River)
- Kangarilla

The following localities and towns of the Mount Barker District Council area are situated inside (or largely inside) the bounds of the Hundred of Kuitpo:

- Hahndorf (west of main street)
- Paechtown
- Echunga (most part)
- Biggs Flat
- Chapel Hill
- Jupiter Creek
- Meadows
- Prospect Hill

== See also ==
- Kuitpo, South Australia, contemporary locality at the centre of the hundred
- Kuitpo Colony, South Australia, contemporary locality at the south of the hundred
- Lands administrative divisions of South Australia
