= Hundred of Onkaparinga =

Onkaparinga
- Cadastral division
- Coordinates: 34.956°S 138.832°E
- Country: Australia
- State: South Australia
- Region: Adelaide Hills
- Established: 29 October 1846

Area
  - Total: 390 km^{2} (151 sq mi)
- County: Adelaide
Lands administrative divisions around Onkaparinga
Yatala	Talunga	Tungkillo
Adelaide	Onkaparinga	Kanmantoo
Noarlunga	Kuitpo	Macclesfield

The Hundred of Onkaparinga is a cadastral hundred of the County of Adelaide, South Australia, in the Adelaide Hills. It was proclaimed by Governor Frederick Robe in 1846 and named for the Onkaparinga River valley, which flows from north east to south west through the hundred.

The main towns within the hundred are Woodside, Lobethal, Balhannah and, on the southern fringe, Hahndorf. The Adelaide suburb of Crafers is another major population centre in the hundred.

== Local government ==
The earliest local government within the hundred was established with the formation of the district councils of Onkaparinga and East Torrens on the same day in 1853, which incorporated the entire hundred. East Torrens governed almost half of the hundred in the west and Onkaparinga council governed the remainder.

In 1858 the District Council of Crafers seceded from the south of the hundred. Crafers was in turn annexed by the District Council of Stirling in 1935.

In 1997 all of the hundred with the exception of Hahndorf township, on the southern fringe, came under the local governance of the much larger Adelaide Hills Council area, when that council was formed by amalgamations of East Torrens, Onkaparinga and Stirling councils with the District Council of Gumeracha.
