= Tooperang, South Australia =

Tooperang South Australia
- Coordinates: 35.37°S 138.71°E
- Population: 377 (2011 census)
- Postcode(s): 5255
- Location: 50 km (31 mi) South of Adelaide
- LGA(s): Alexandrina Council
- Region: Fleurieu and Kangaroo Island
- County: County of Hindmarsh
- State electorate(s): Finniss
- Federal division(s): Mayo
Mean max temp	Mean min temp	Annual rainfall
19.6 °C; 67 °F	8.0 °C; 46 °F	830 mm 32.7 in
Localities around Tooperang:
Nangkita	Ashbourne	Mount Observation
Mount Compass	Tooperang	Finniss
Mount Jagged	Mosquito Hill	Currency Creek

Tooperang is a small town and locality on Fleurieu Peninsula in the Alexandrina Council, South Australia. It includes the Cox Scrub Conservation Reserve. At the 2011 census, the "suburb" of Tooperang (which also included both Mount Jagged and Mosquito Hill) recorded a population of 377 people.

The Tooperang Hall on Bull Creek Road hosts the Astronomical Society of South Australia (ASSA) on a regular basis where members take advantage of the geography of the region which blocks light spill from metropolitan Adelaide to create ideal conditions for astronomy. The locality of Tooperang extends west from the town along Cleland Gully Road.

Tooperang is located within the federal division of Mayo, the state electoral district of Finniss and the local government area of the Alexandrina Council.
