= Bullock Hill Conservation Park =

Protected area in South Australia

- IUCN category III (natural monument or feature)
- Location within South Australia
- Location: South Australia, Ashbourne
- Nearest city: Strathalbyn
- Coordinates: 35°18′42″S 138°47′52″E
- Area: 2.21 km^{2} (0.85 sq mi)
- Established: 30 January 2014
- Governing body: Department of Environment and Water
- Website: https://www.parks.sa.gov.au/find-a-park/Browse_by_region/Murray_River/bullock-hill-conservation-park

Bullock Hill Conservation Park is a protected area located in the Australian state of South Australia in the locality of Ashbourne about 45 kilometres (28 mi) south of the state capital of Adelaide and about 10 kilometres (6.2 mi) south-west of the town of Strathalbyn.

The conservation park consists of land in Sections 2082 to 2084 and 2086 in the cadastral unit of the Hundred of Kondoparinga. It was proclaimed on 30 January 2014 over land intended to be given protected area status as recently as the 1990s. A separate proclamation on the same day preserved existing “rights of entry, prospecting, exploration or mining” over the land. Its name was approved by the Surveyor General of South Australia on 11 March 1997 and is derived from Bullock Hill, a hill of 188 metres (617 ft) height, which is located within the boundaries of the conservation park. As of 2018, it covered an area of 2.21 square kilometres (0.85 sq mi).

A brochure published in 2011 by the Department of Environment and Natural Resources about three years before the proclamation of the conservation park in 2014 described it as consisting of a forest of pink and gums over an understory dominated by acacia species with a grassland on its eastern side that includes a scattering of blue gum. The official webpage for the conservation park advises that it has a population of western grey kangaroos and contains bird species such as red wattlebirds, rainbow bee-eater, brown-headed honeyeaters, black-faced cuckoo-shrike and grey shrike-thrush.

The conservation park is classified as an IUCN Category III protected area.

== See also ==
- Protected areas of South Australia
