= Hundred of Adelaide =

Adelaide
- Cadastral division
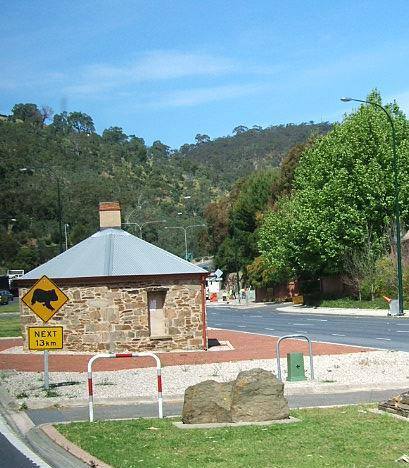
- The Old Toll House, Urrbrae, at roughly the centre of the hundred

- Coordinates: 34°57′58″S 138°37′03″E
- Country: Australia
- State: South Australia
- Established: 29 October 1846

Area
  - Total: 270 km^{2} (106 sq mi)
- County: Adelaide
Lands administrative divisions around Adelaide
| Port Adelaide | Yatala | Yatala |
| Port Adelaide | Adelaide | Onkaparinga |
| Noarlunga | Noarlunga | Noarlunga |

The Hundred of Adelaide is a cadastral hundred in the city of Adelaide spanning all the inner suburbs south of River Torrens. It is one of the eleven hundreds of the County of Adelaide, and was one of the first hundreds to be proclaimed. Like the city it surrounds, the Hundred was named after Queen Adelaide, and was named by Governor Frederick Robe in 1846. It is 106 square miles (270 km^{2}); close to but not exactly one hundred square miles as with most of the other hundreds. Its north boundary is the Torrens River and the Sturt River forms the south east boundary, with the hundred extending to the Adelaide foothills.

The Hundred of Adelaide includes all of Adelaide's metropolitan area south of the Torrens and north of the Sturt River, with those inner suburbs north of the Torrens falling in the Hundred of Yatala.

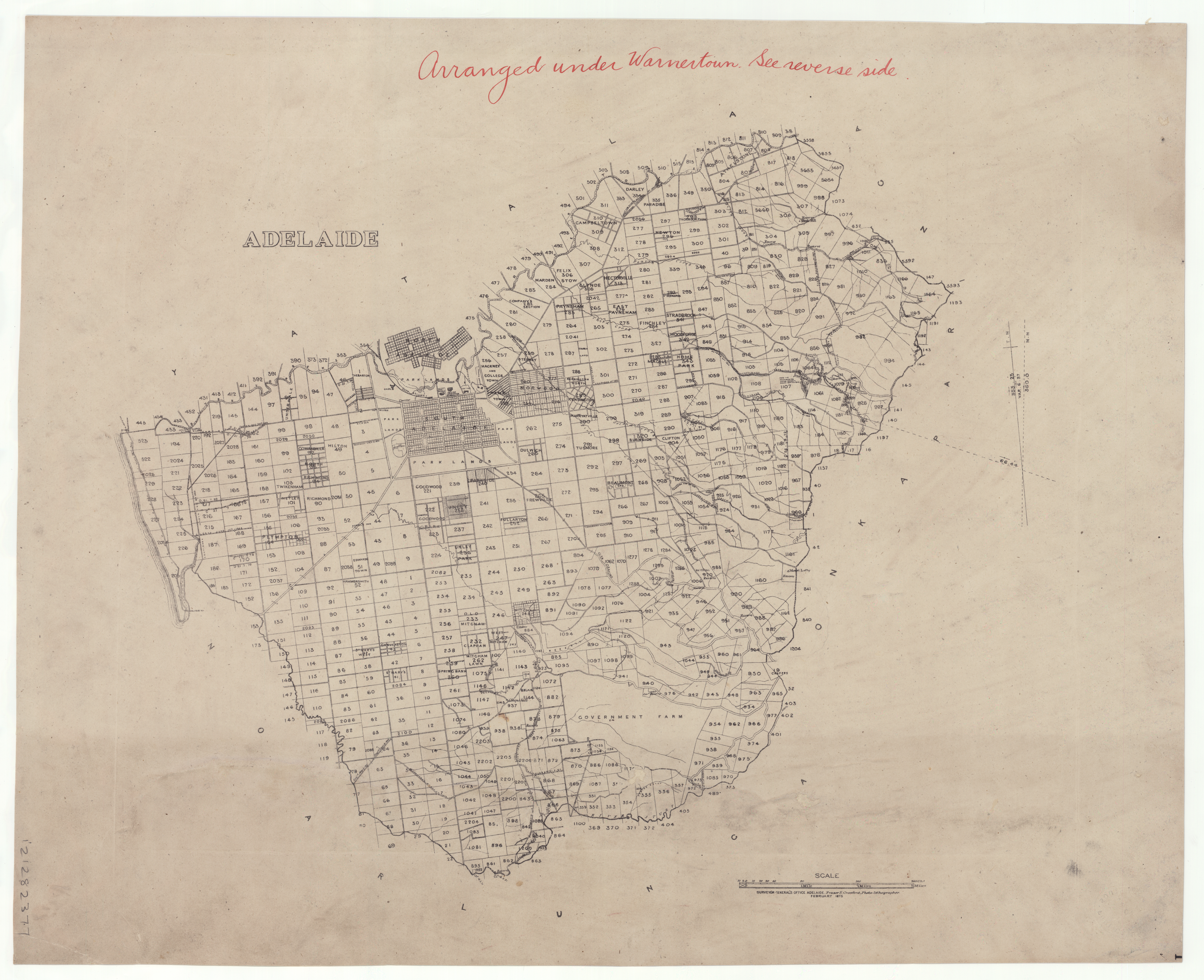
Plan of the Hundred of Adelaide, 1873

== Local government ==
The first local government body in the Hundred of Adelaide was the City of Adelaide council, established in 1840, disestablished in 1843, and revived in 1852. From November 1952, the "Act to appoint District Councils" meant that other townships and urban centres within the hundred started formed local government bodies, with the new district councils of Mitcham in the south, East Torrens in the east and Hindmarsh in the west being established by May 1853. By July of the same year the District Council of West Torrens had been established in the west and the Corporate Town of Kensington and Norwood had been established as an enclave inside East Torrens council, bringing the whole of the hundred under local government.

The modern local government areas within the Hundred of Adelaide are:

- City of Adelaide (south of the Torrens, so excluding North Adelaide)
- City of West Torrens
- City of Norwood Payneham St Peters
- City of Campbelltown
- City of Burnside
- City of Unley
- City of Mitcham
- City of Marion (portion east of Sturt Creek only)
- Adelaide Hills Council (portions west of Stirling, Crafers, Summertown, Ashton, Marble Hill, Cherryville and Montacute only)
- City of Charles Sturt (small coastal portion south of Henley Beach Road only)

== See also ==
- Lands administrative divisions of South Australia
