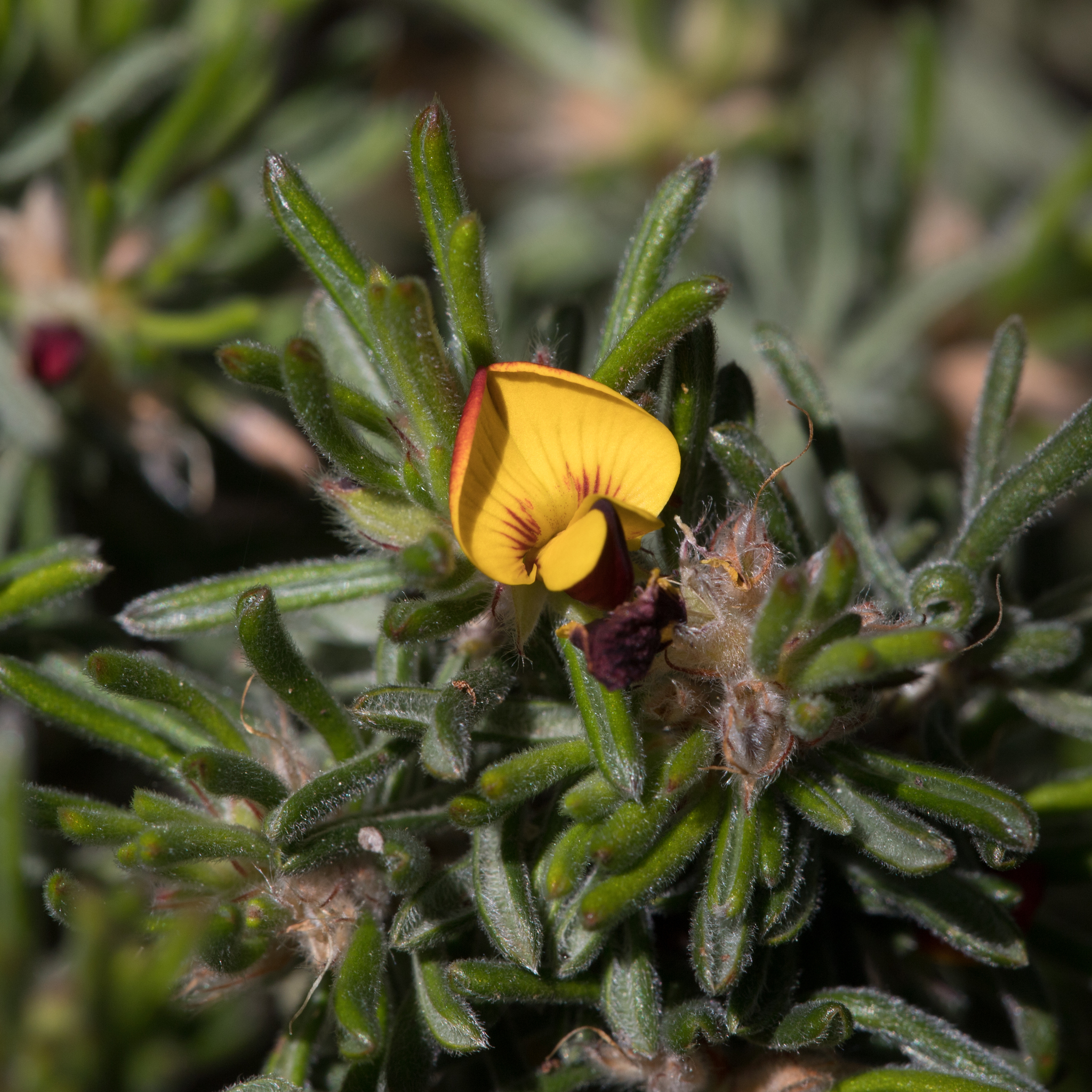
- Pultenaea canaliculata near Mount Compass

Scientific classification
- Kingdom: Plantae
- Clade: Tracheophytes
- Clade: Angiosperms
- Clade: Eudicots
- Clade: Rosids
- Order: Fabales
- Family: Fabaceae
- Subfamily: Faboideae
- Genus: Pultenaea
- Species: P. canaliculata

Binomial name
- Pultenaea canaliculata F.Muell.

Synonyms
- Pultenaea canaliculata F.Muell. isonym; Pultenaea canaliculata F.Muell. var. canaliculata; Pultenaea canaliculata var. latifolia H.B.Will.; Pultenaea tenuifolia auct. non R.Br. & Sims: Kok, R.P.J. de & West, J.G.

= Pultenaea canaliculata =

Coast bush-pea

Species of flowering plant

Pultenaea canaliculata, commonly known as coast bush-pea, is a species of flowering plant in the family Fabaceae and is endemic to coastal areas of southern continental Australia. It is a rigid, spreading shrub with hairy, cylindrical leaves, and yellow and crimson flowers.

== Description ==
Pultenaea canaliculata is a rigid, spreading shrub that typically grows to a height of 1–2 m (3 ft 3 in – 6 ft 7 in) with silky-hairy stems. The leaves are needle-shaped, 8–12 mm (0.31–0.47 in) long and 1–1.5 mm (0.039–0.059 in) wide and densely hairy with stipules 2–4 mm (0.079–0.157 in) long at the base. The flowers are borne in clusters near the ends of branchlets surrounded by and often partially hidden by the leaves. There are lance-shaped to awl-shaped bracteoles about 6 mm (0.24 in) long at the base of the sepals. The sepals are about 6 mm (0.24 in) long and densely covered with golden hairs. The standard petal is yellow, 6–7 mm (0.24–0.28 in) long, the wings yellow and the keel is crimson, about the same length as the wings. Flowering occurs from September to November and the fruit is an oval pod surrounded by the remains of the sepals.

== Taxonomy and naming ==
Pultenaea canaliculata was first formally described in 1855 by Ferdinand von Mueller in his book Definitions of rare or hitherto undescribed Australian plants from specimens collected "at Encounter Bay". The specific epithet (canaliculata) means "channelled".

== Distribution and habitat ==
Coast bush-pea grows on coastal dunes and limestone cliffs from Wilson's Promontory in Victoria, east to the Eyre Peninsula in South Australia, including on Kangaroo Island.
