= District Council of Strathalbyn =

- Local government area
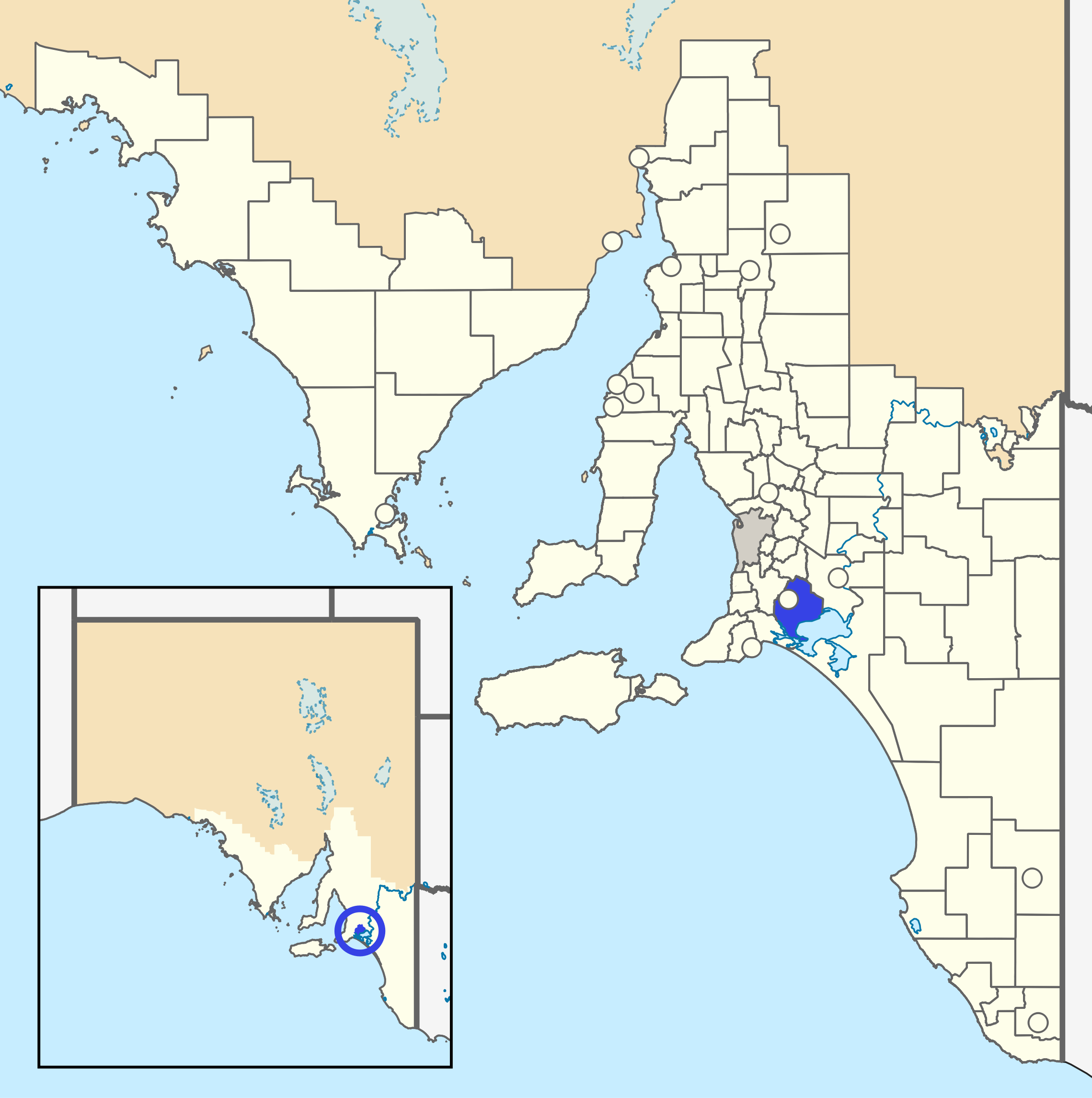
- The District Council of Strathalbyn (blue) as it was in 1970, prior to merging with the Corporate Town of Strathalbyn (marked by a circle)
- Coordinates: 35.2588°S 138.8898°E
- Country: Australia
- State: South Australia
- Established: 7 May 1854
- Abolished: 1 July 1997
- Council seat: Strathalbyn

Area
  - Total: 85,000 ha (210,000 acres)
LGAs around District Council of Strathalbyn
Macclesfield	Mount Barker; Onaunga	Nairne; Monarto; Onaunga
Kondoparinga	Strathalbyn	Monarto; Bremer
Kondoparinga; Bremer	Bremer	Bremer

The District Council of Strathalbyn was a local government area in South Australia centred on the town of Strathalbyn from 1854 until 1997. From 1868 the township itself was locally governed by the Corporation of Strathalbyn but that entity was amalgamated back into the district council in 1976.

== History ==
The District Council of Strathalbyn was proclaimed on 7 May 1854 with the council area including most of the Hundred of Strathalbyn, the township being at the district's south-westernern extremity. Strathalbyn founder and parliamentarian John Rankine was named as one of the inaugural councillors along with Edward Sterling, Frederick William Bassett, William Colman and Archibald McLean (son of Strathalbyn pioneer Donald McLean).

On 23 May 1861 a significant northeastern portion of the council area was excised and joined to parts of neighbouring councils to form the new District Council of Onaunga seated at Woodchester.

In 1868 the Corporation of Strathalbyn seceded from the district council to locally govern the township as a separated entity.

On 21 March 1935 Strathalbyn became much larger when it absorbed most of the District Council of Bremer, most of District Council of Onaunga and portions of the District Council of Brinkley and District Council of Kondoparinga by enactment of the Local Government Areas (Re-arrangement) Acts 1929 and 1931. By 1936 the council area was reported as being 210,000 acres (85,000 ha) in size while the Strathalbyn township area (separately governed enclave at the time) was reported as being 750 acres (300 ha).

On 22 April 1976 the corporation was amalgamated back into the District Council of Strathalbyn.

In 1997 Strathalbyn amalgamated with the District Council of Port Elliot and Goolwa and District Council of Willunga to form the new Alexandrina Council.
