= Hundred of Kondoparinga =

Kondoparinga
- Cadastral division
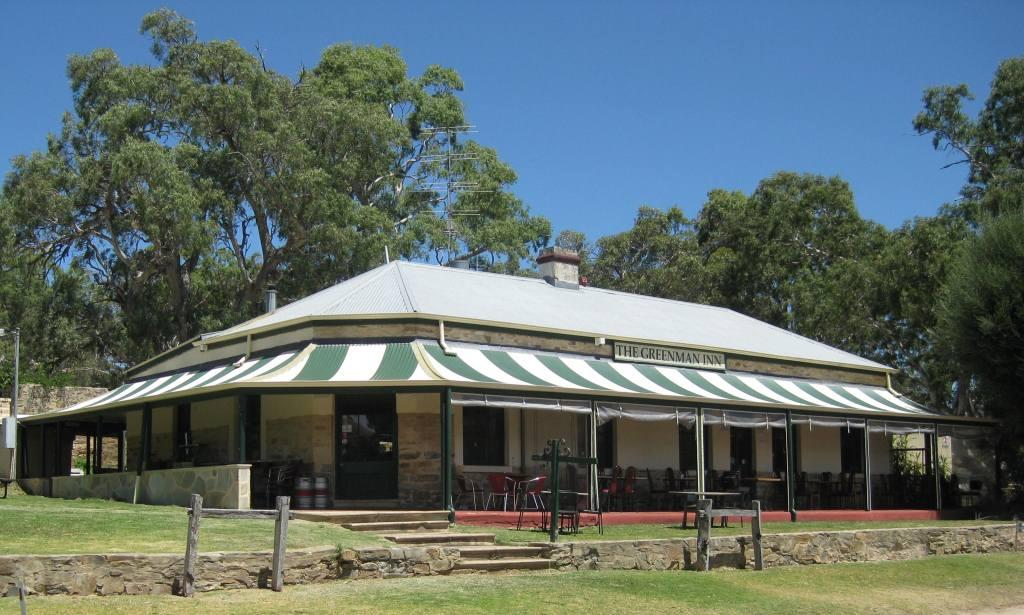
- The Greenman Inn, Ashbourne

- Coordinates: 35.29°S 138.79°E
- Country: Australia
- State: South Australia
- Established: 29 October 1846

Area
  - Total: 210 km^{2} (80 sq mi)
- County: County of Hindmarsh
Lands administrative divisions around Kondoparinga
| Kuitpo | Macclesfield | Strathalbyn |
| Myponga | Kondoparinga | Bremer |
| Nangkita | Nangkita | Alexandrina |

The Hundred of Kondoparinga is a cadastral unit of hundred in South Australia. It was proclaimed on 29 October 1846 and covers an area of 210 square kilometres (80 sq mi). It is one of the eleven hundreds of the County of Hindmarsh .

The District Council of Kondoparinga was established in 1853, bringing local government to the hundred as well as parts of the westerly adjacent Hundred of Kuitpo. The Kondoparinga council was abolished in 1935 by amalgamation with Echunga, Clarendon and Macclesfield councils into the new District Council of Meadows.

== Etymology ==
The name Kondoparinga was once thought to be a Kaurna word meaning "long winding water, breeding crawfish, between steep banks" but contemporary linguists are highly doubtful and suggest a more literal meaning of "chest river place" based on kondo meaning "chest", pari meaning "river" and the locative suffix ngga.

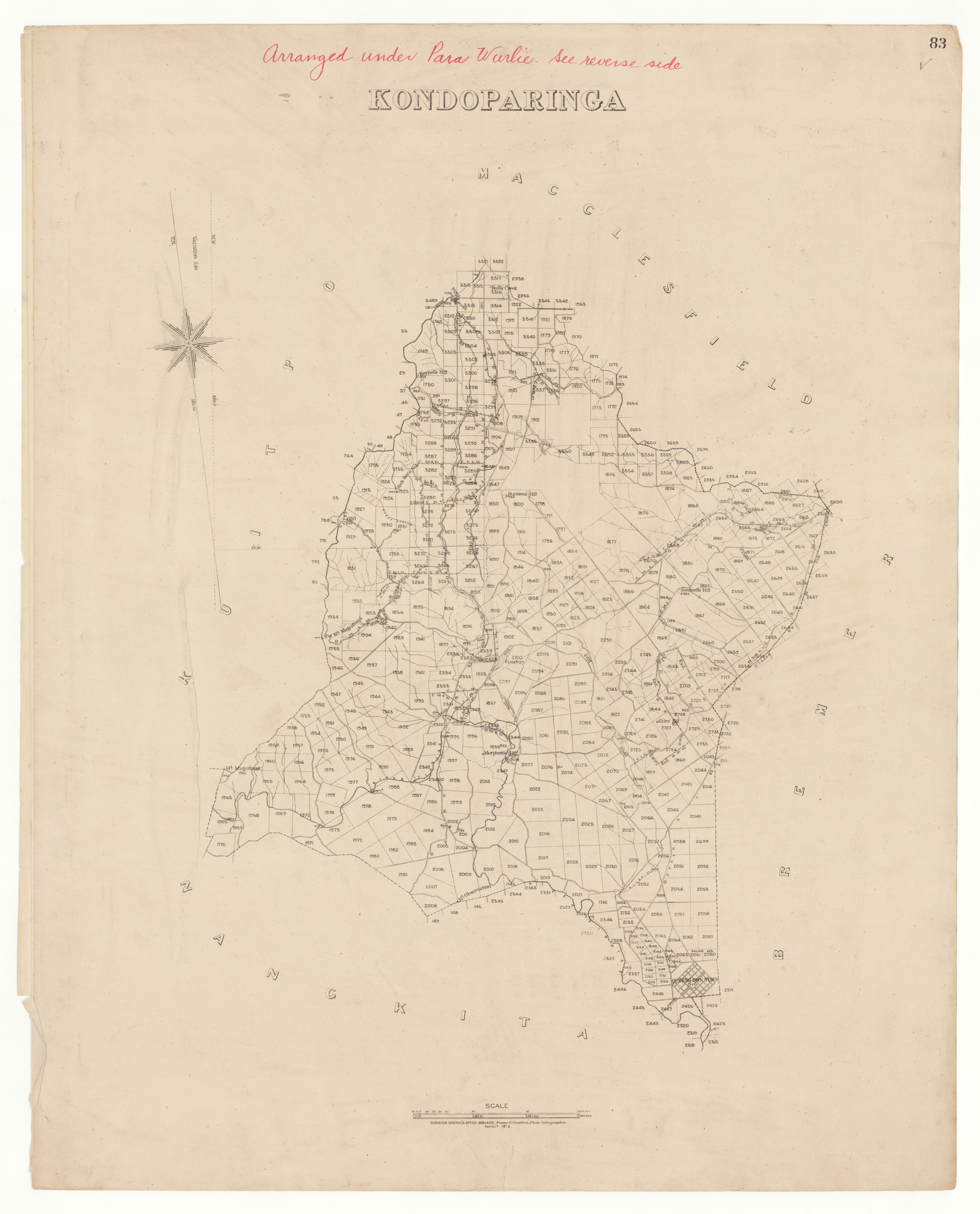
Plan of the Hundred of Kondoparinga in 1872

== Localities ==
The Hundred of Kondoparinga includes the following localities:

- Ashbourne
- Bull Creek
- parts of Finniss
- McHarg Creek
- Meadows
- Mount Magnificent
- Mount Observation
- Nangkita
- Paris Creek
- Prospect Hill
- Sandergrove
- parts of Strathalbyn

== See also ==
- Lands administrative divisions of South Australia
