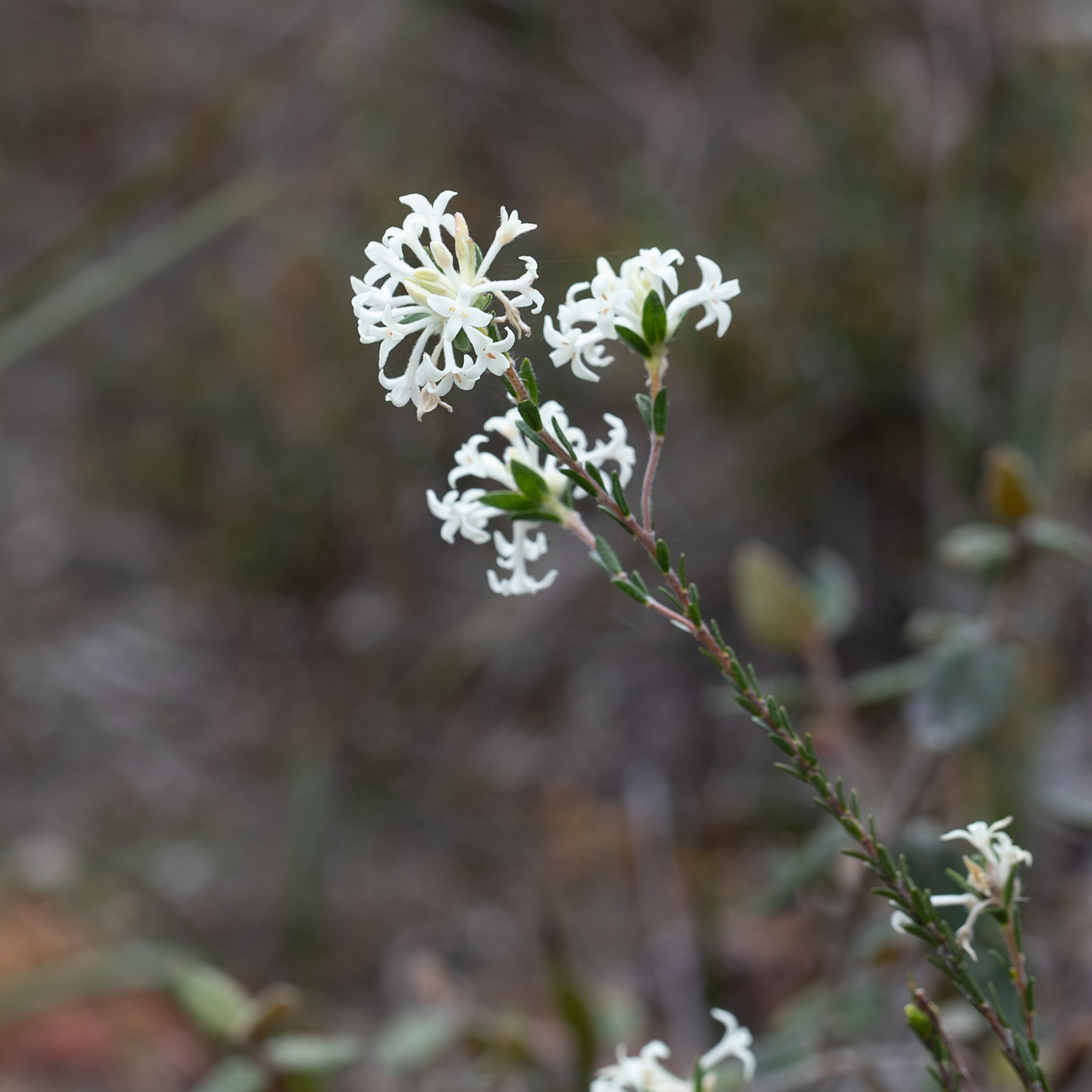
- In Cox Scrub Conservation Park

Scientific classification
- Kingdom: Plantae
- Clade: Tracheophytes
- Clade: Angiosperms
- Clade: Eudicots
- Clade: Rosids
- Order: Malvales
- Family: Thymelaeaceae
- Genus: Pimelea
- Species: P. phylicoides

Binomial name
- Pimelea phylicoides Meisn.

= Pimelea phylicoides =

Species of shrub

Pimelea phylicoides, commonly known as heath rice-flower, is a species of flowering plant in the family Thymelaeaceae and is endemic to southern continental Australia. It is an erect shrub with densely hairy young stems, narrowly egg-shaped to elliptic leaves, and heads of white flowers surrounded by 3 to 6 involucral bracts.

== Description ==
Pimelea phylicoides is an erect shrub that typically grows to a height of 20–50 cm (7.9–19.7 in), sometimes up to 1 m (3 ft 3 in), and has its young stems densely covered with spreading hairs. The leaves are narrowly egg-shaped to elliptic, 2–10 mm (0.079–0.394 in) long and 1–3 mm (0.039–0.118 in) wide on a short petiole. Both sides of the leaves are the same shade of green to dark bluish-green, the upper surface glabrous and the lower surface covered with fine, white hairs. The flowers are arranged in clusters of 3 to 18 on the ends of branches, surrounded by 3 to 6 sessile, egg-shaped involucral bracts 3–9 mm (0.12–0.35 in) long, 1–4 mm (0.039–0.157 in) wide. The flowers are bisexual, the floral tube 5–8 mm (0.20–0.31 in) long and the sepals 2–4 mm (0.079–0.157 in) long. Flowering mainly occurs from June to February.

== Taxonomy and naming ==
Pimelea phylicoides was first formally described in 1848 by Carl Meissner in Lehmann's Plantae Preissianae. The specific epithet (petrophila) means "Phylica-like".

== Distribution and habitat ==
Heath rice-flower usually grows in sandy soil in forest and heath, and is found in scattered populations from the Eyre Peninsula in South Australia to Melbourne in Victoria, with an isolated population on Wilsons Promontory.
