= County of Adelaide =

Adelaide
- Cadastral division
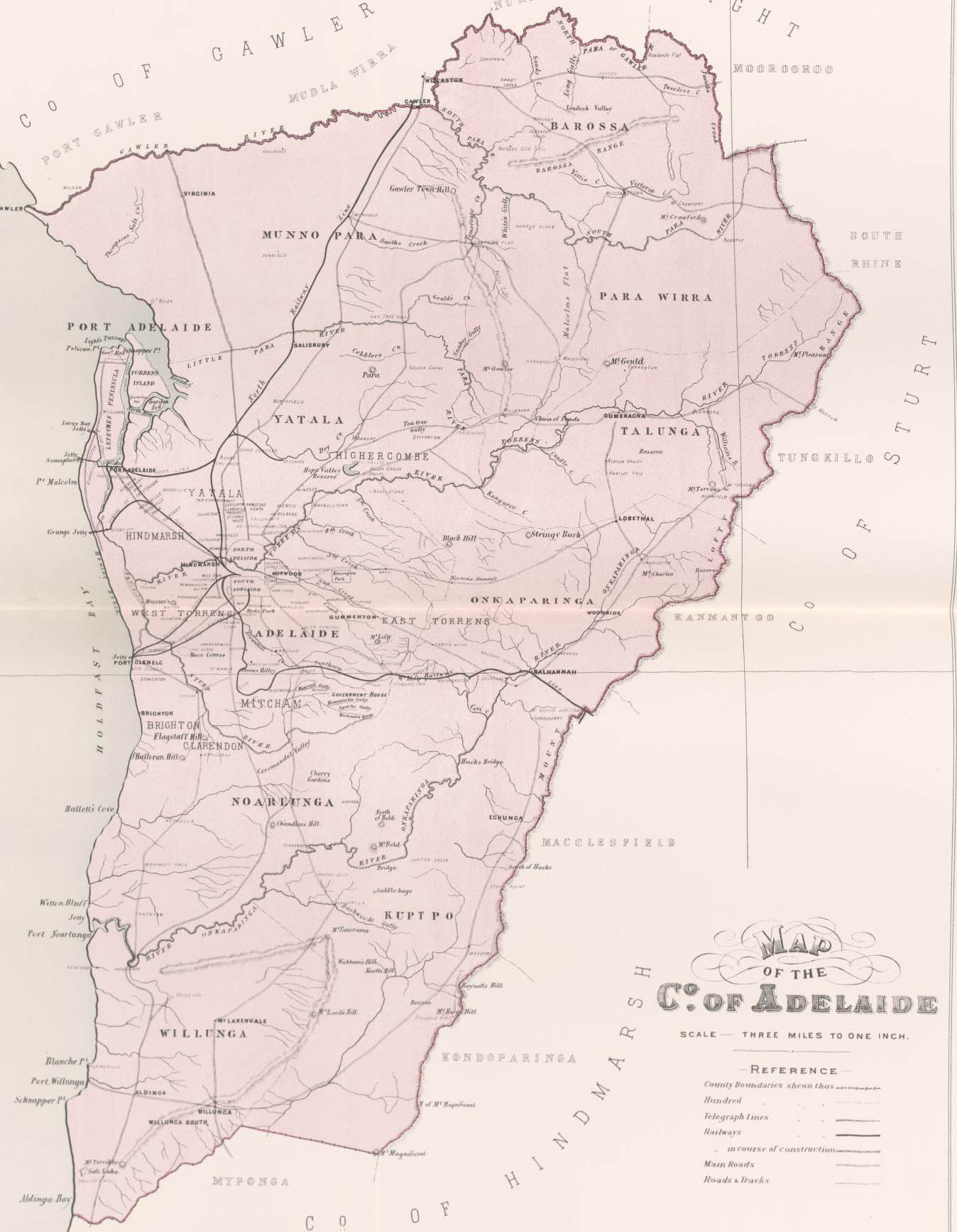
- Map of Adelaide County in 1886 showing the hundreds
- Country: Australia
- State: South Australia
- Established: 2 June 1842

Area
  - Total: 2,960 km^{2} (1,141 sq mi)
Lands administrative divisions around Adelaide
Gawler	Light	Eyre
Gulf St Vincent	Adelaide	Sturt
Hindmarsh	Hindmarsh	Hindmarsh

The County of Adelaide is one of the 49 cadastral counties of South Australia and contains the city of Adelaide. It was proclaimed on 2 June 1842 by Governor Grey. It is bounded by the Gawler River and North Para River in the north, the Mount Lofty Ranges in the east, and Gulf St Vincent in the west. The south border runs from Aldinga Bay to Willunga South and Mount Magnificent.

The county held at least 60% of South Australia's population between 1855 and 1921; this figure rose to 70.6% in 1966.

== Hundreds ==
The county is divided into the following hundreds, from north west to south east:

- Hundred of Port Adelaide in the north west beside Gulf St Vincent between the Gawler River and Grand Junction Road
- Hundred of Barossa in the north spanning the Barossa Range
- Hundred of Munno Para in the north between the Gawler and Little Para rivers
- Hundred of Para Wirra in the north east immediately south of the South Para River
- Hundred of Yatala beside Gulf St Vincent between the Little Para and Torrens rivers
- Hundred of Talunga in the east, spanning the Torrens Valley in the Adelaide Hills
- Hundred of Adelaide in the west beside Gulf St Vincent and south of the Torrens River
- Hundred of Onkaparinga in the east spanning the Onkaparinga Valley in the Adelaide Hills
- Hundred of Noarlunga in the south west beside Gulf St Vincent between the Sturt and Onkaparinga rivers
- Hundred of Willunga in the south beside Gulf St Vincent and immediately south of the Onkaparinga
- Hundred of Kuitpo in the south east spanning the Adelaide Hills from the upper Onkaparinga and South Eastern Freeway to Mount Magnificent

== See also ==
- Lands administrative divisions of South Australia
