= Hundred of Macclesfield =

- Cadastral division
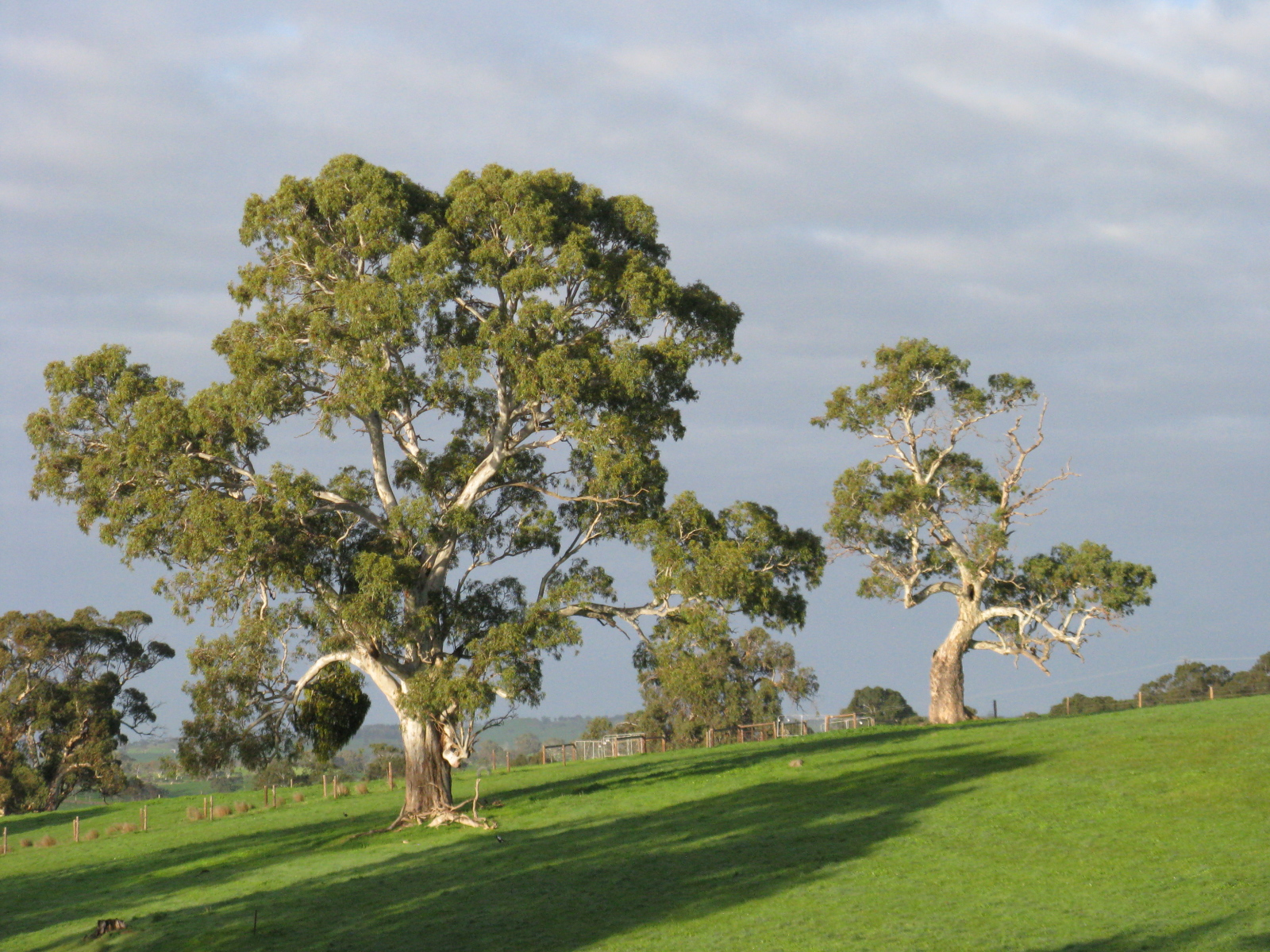
- Gums in the locality of Macclesfield

- Coordinates: 35°08′29″S 138°50′33″E
- Country: Australia
- State: South Australia
- LGA(s): District Council of Mount Barker; Alexandrina Council
- Established: 29 October 1846

Area
  - Total: 180 km^{2} (70 sq mi)
- County: County of Hindmarsh
Lands administrative divisions around Hundred of Macclesfield
Onkaparinga	Onkaparinga	Kanmantoo
Kuitpo	Macclesfield	Strathalbyn
Kondoparinga	Bremer	Strathalbyn

The Hundred of Macclesfield is a cadastral division of the County of Hindmarsh in South Australia. It lies in the Adelaide Hills and straddles the South Eastern Freeway. It is named after the Earl of Macclesfield while the aboriginal name used for the area covered by the hundred is reported to be Kangowirranilla, meaning 'place for kangaroos and water'. Within its bounds are the localities of Blakiston, Flaxley, Littlehampton, Macclesfield, Totness, parts of Bugle Ranges, Echunga, Gemmells, Green Hills Range, Meadows, Mount Barker, Mount Barker Junction, Mount Barker Summit, Nairne, Paris Creek, Strathalbyn and Wistow.
