= Hundred of Strathalbyn =

- Cadastral division
- Coordinates: 35.20°S 138.95°E
- Country: Australia
- State: South Australia
- LGA(s): Alexandrina Council
- Established: 12 December 1850

Area
  - Total: 210 km^{2} (83 sq mi)
- County: County of Hindmarsh
- Hundred: Strathalbyn
Lands administrative divisions around Hundred of Strathalbyn
Macclesfield	Kanmantoo	Monarto
Macclesfield	Hundred of Strathalbyn	Freeling
Kondoparinga	Bremer	Freeling

The Hundred of Strathalbyn is a cadastral division of the County of Hindmarsh in South Australia. It lies west of the Adelaide Hills and east of Lake Alexandrina and includes at its southwestern extremity the town of Strathalbyn. Its name is derived from that used for a sub-division granted in 1841. No definitive derivation for the subdivision of Strathalbyn name is known, but it is deemed probable that John Rankine or his brother William provided the name with the meaning given as "white valley" from the Scottish srath and albion. Mount Barker Creek forms much of the northern hundred boundary while the Bremer River forms the eastern border.

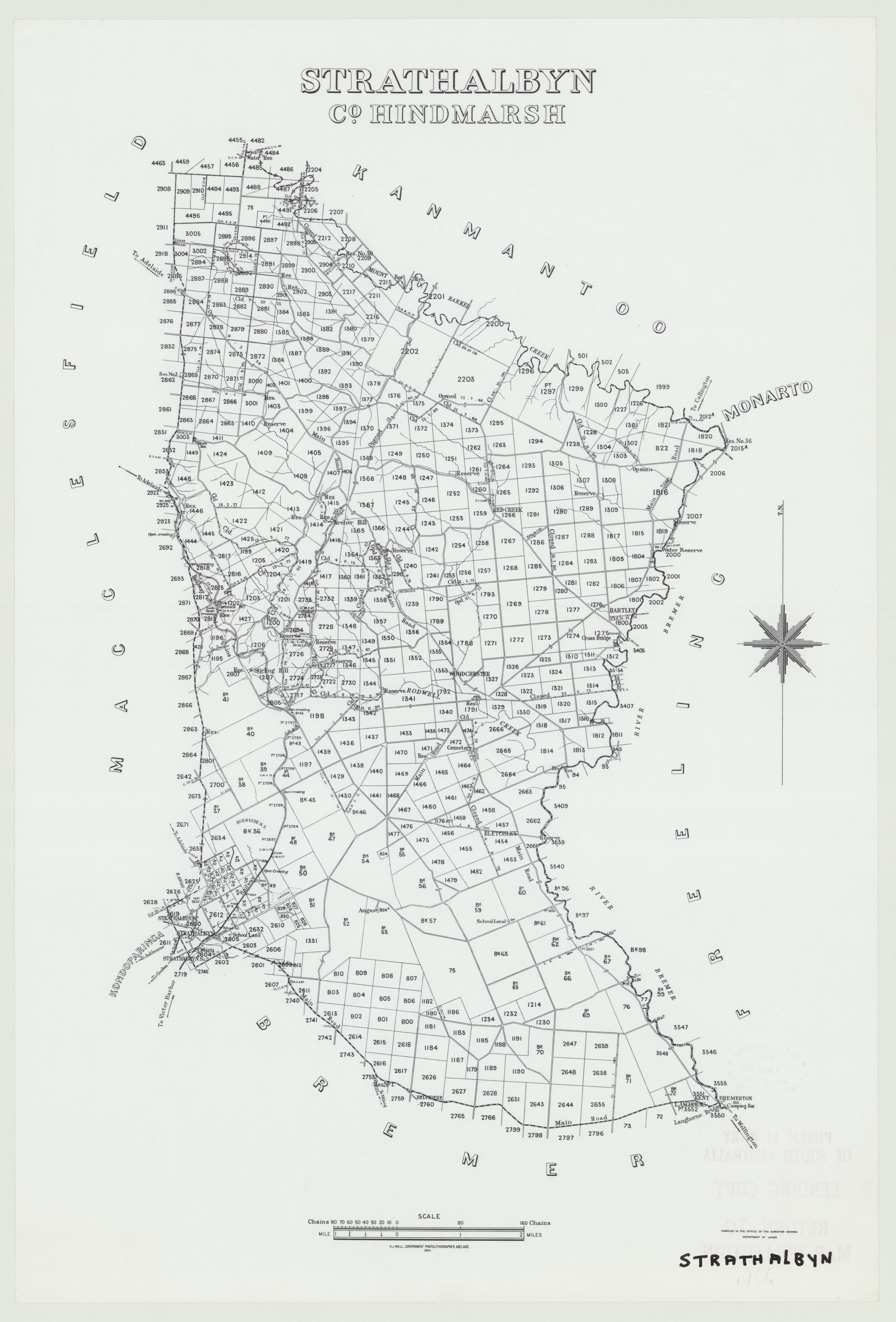
Plan of the Hundred of Strathalbyn in 1964

The localities of Highland Valley, Red Creek, Salem and the township of Woodchester are also within the hundred along with parts of Belvidere, Bletchley, Gemmells, Hartley, and Langhorne Creek. Parts of the Bugle Ranges, Mount Barker, Mount Barker Springs, Petwood and Wistow localities also overlap the northwestern part of the hundred.

== Local government ==
The District Council of Strathalbyn was established within the south of the hundred in 1854. The Corporated Town of Strathalbyn seceded in 1868 to form dedicated local government for the township until it re-amalgamated with the district council in 1976. In 1997 the Strathalbyn council was dissolved and absorbed into the new and much larger Alexandrina Council.
