= District Council of Onkaparinga =

Coordinates: 34°54′46″S 138°40′34″E

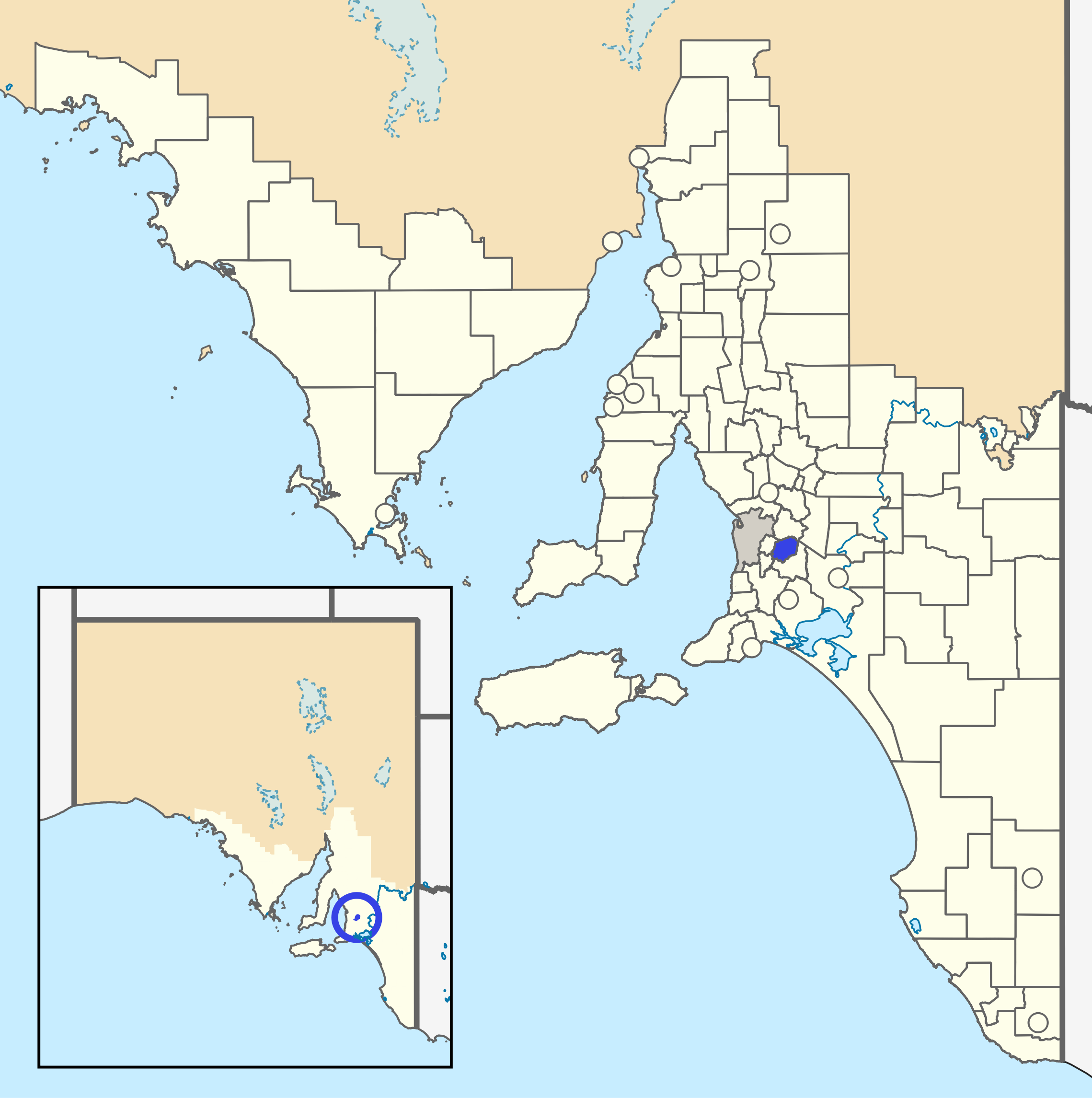
The District Council of Onkaparinga as it was prior to disestablishment (blue)

The District Council of Onkaparinga was a local government council of South Australia from 1853 to 1997.

== History ==
The council was gazetted on 2 June 1853, on the same day as East Torrens and Hindmarsh. Local government had only been introduced in South Australia in 1852, and only the City of Adelaide (1852) and District Council of Mitcham (12 May 1853) had been created earlier.

At the time of establishment the Onkaparinga council covered the eastern bulk of the Hundred of Onkaparinga (that is, excluding the western portion of the hundred which was proclaimed, on the same day, to be within the East Torrens council). The council area included the Onkaparinga Valley townships of Balhannah and Woodside at its centre, being roughly split north west from south east by the path of the upper Onkaparinga River.

The inaugural councillors were Alexander Lorimer, F. William Kleinschmidt, William Kelly, James Johnston, and Johann D. Weinert.

In 1997 Onkaparinga council was amalgamated with the much-reduced District Council of East Torrens, the District Council of Gumeracha and the District Council of Stirling to form the Adelaide Hills Council.

== See also ==
- Onkaparinga Valley
