= District Council of East Torrens =

- Local government area
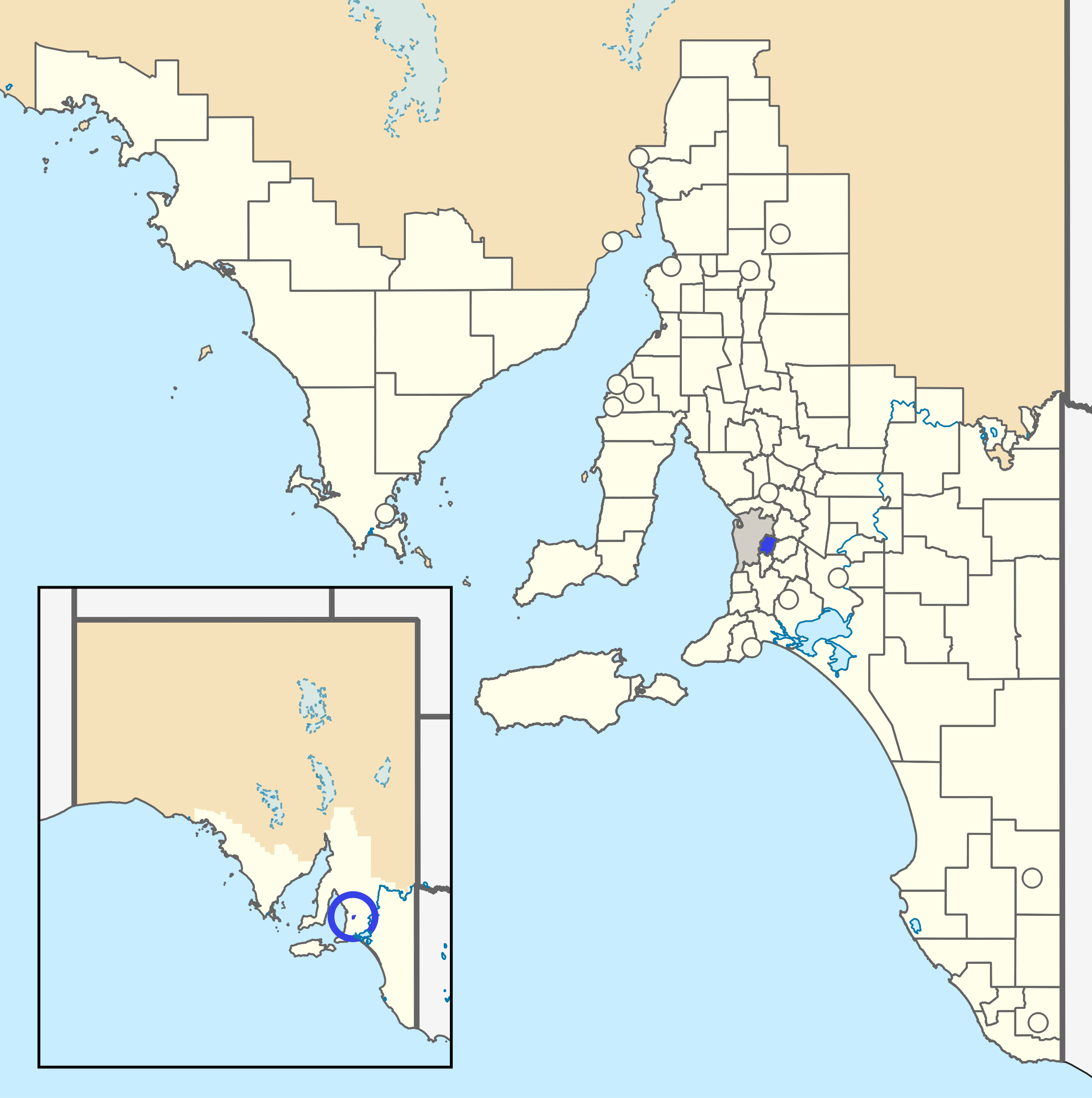
- The District Council of East Torrens as it was prior to disestablishment (blue)
- Coordinates: 34°54′46″S 138°40′34″E
- Country: Australia
- State: South Australia
- Established: 1853
- Abolished: 1997
- Council seat: Norton Summit (1936)
LGAs around District Council of East Torrens
Yatala (1853–1855); Walkerville (1855–1856); Payneham/ Campbelltown (1856–1997)	Highercombe (1853–1935); Tea Tree Gully (1935–1997)	Highercombe (1853–1935); Tea Tree Gully (1935–1997)
Burnside (1856–1997); Payneham/ Campbelltown (1856–1997)	District Council of East Torrens	Onkaparinga (1853–1997)
Mitcham (1853–1858); Crafers (1858–1935); Stirling (1935–1997)	Echunga (1853–1858); Crafers (1858–1935); Stirling (1935–1997)	Mount Barker (1853–1997)

The District Council of East Torrens was a local government council of South Australia from 1853 to 1997.

Present local government in the original East Torrens council area includes the City of Norwood Payneham and St Peters, the City of Burnside, the City of Campbelltown and the Adelaide Hills Council.

== History ==
It was gazetted on 2 June 1853, on the same day as Onkaparinga and Hindmarsh. Local government had only been introduced in South Australia in 1852, and only the City of Adelaide (1852) and District Council of Mitcham (12 May 1853) had been created earlier.

At the time of establishment the East Torrens council covered 12 square miles (31 km^{2}) including almost half of the Hundred of Adelaide and a large western portion of the Hundred of Onkaparinga. Excepting the six sections of the Hundred of Adelaide that would constitute the Town of Norwood and Kensington days later, the East Torrens council was bounded by the River Torrens to the north, the Adelaide Parklands to the west, the Great Eastern Road (now the South Eastern Freeway) to the south, and included most of the modern Adelaide Hills localities of Mount George, Carey Gully, Forest Range, Montacute and Castambul on the eastern boundary.

The council's first five members were Dr David Wark, James Cobbledick, Charles Bonney, Daniel Ferguson and George Müller, as appointed by the Governor alongside the proclamation under the District Councils Act 1852 pending subsequent elections. It was subsequently divided up into five wards: St Bernards, Uraidla, Norwood, Glenunga and Stepney. The councillors met for the first time at the World's End Hotel in Magill on 12 June 1853.

Henry Septimus Clark was Secretary and Engineer with the council, and Joseph Crompton of Stonyfell was employed by him and took over much of his work when he fell ill.

In 1855 the population of the council area was 3,705, higher by a thousand than the adjacent Town of Kensington and Norwood.

The huge area of East Torrens was not to prove as stable as Kensington and Norwood. Ratepayers were frustrated as to where their money was going; councillors did not have the administration or funds to operate effectively and the interests of the area were hugely varied. On 14 August 1856, the district councils of Payneham and Burnside were separated, respectively, from the north west and south west, city-side parts of East Torrens. East Torrens council was further divided in 1858 with the secession of the District Council of Crafers. The original East Torrens council had broken up into eight separate councils or partial councils (including the remainder East Torrens itself) by 1930. Apart from St Peters, Payneham, Campbelltown, Burnside and Crafers, parts of the rural district councils of Onkaparinga and Talunga had annexed parts of East Torrens. The main population centre at the heart of the remaining area was Norton Summit which was host to council meetings from 1897 and had become the official seat of the council by 1903.

The District Council of East Torrens, though drastically reduced in size by the 1930s, existed until 1997, when it amalgamated with the District Council of Gumeracha, the District Council of Onkaparinga and the District Council of Stirling to form the Adelaide Hills Council.

== Chairmen of the District Council of East Torrens ==
- Charles William Wycliffe Giles (1933–1942)
- George Prentice (1942–1949)
- William James Bishop (1949–1965)
- William Archibald Badenoch (1965–1969)
- Harry James Wotton (1969–1981)

== Neighbouring local government ==
The following adjacent local government bodies co-existed with the East Torrens council prior to the secession of the district councils of Payneham and Burnside in 1856:

- District Council of Yatala lay north west until the riverside municipality of Walkerville seceded from Yatala adjacent to the Adelaide parklands in July 1855 creating a second north western neighbour to East Torrens.
- District Council of Highercombe lay immediately north across the Torrens River.
- District Council of Onkaparinga lay immediately east.
- District Council of Mount Barker lay south east.
- District Council of Echunga lay immediately south.
- District Council of Mitcham lay south west and west.
- City of Adelaide eastern parklands lay immediately west.
- Town of Kensington and Norwood lay as an enclave within East Torrens near the western edge of council area.

From 1856 the shape of the East Torrens council changed dramatically with the establishment of Payneham and Burnside councils adjacent to the River Torrens. From 1856 the following adjacent local government bodies co-existed to East Torrens council:

- District Council of Payneham lay north west. From 1868 it was known instead as the District Council Campbelltown, later City of Campbelltown.
- District Council of Highercombe still lay immediately north and north east across the Torrens River.
- District Council of Onkaparinga still lay immediately east.
- District Council of Mount Barker remained the south east neighbour to East Torrens.
- District Council of Echunga lay south until the District Council of Crafers was established by secession from the southwest part of East Torrens in 1858. In 1935, Crafers was annexed by its southern neighbour, the District Council of Stirling, making the latter East Torrens' southern neighbour from that date.
- District Council of Burnside, later called City of Burnside, and the District Council of Payneham, later called City of Campbelltown, lay immediately west.

== See also ==
- Hundred of Adelaide
- Hundred of Onkaparinga
