= City of Noarlunga =

City of Noarlunga South Australia
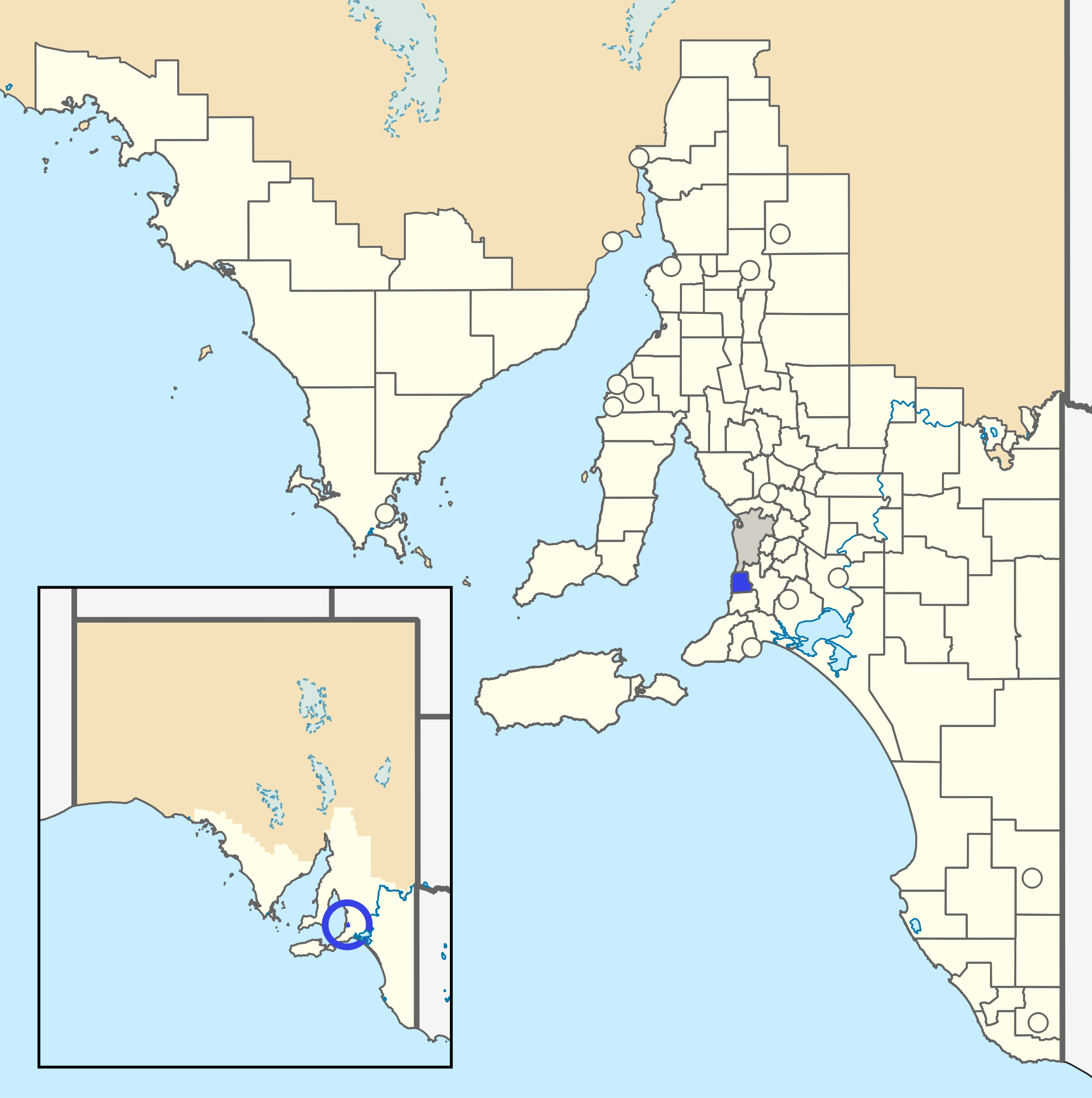
- The LGA as it was in 1970 (blue)
- Coordinates: 35.1400°S 138.4955°E
- Established: 21 August 1856
- Abolished: 1997
- Council seat: Old Noarlunga; Noarlunga Centre
LGAs around City of Noarlunga:
Brighton/Marion; Morphett Vale	Happy Valley; Meadows; Clarendon
City of Noarlunga	Happy Valley; Meadows; Clarendon
Willunga	Kondoparinga; Meadows

The City of Noarlunga, formerly the District Council of Noarlunga, was a local government area in South Australia from 1856 until 1997.

== History ==
The District Council of Noarlunga was established on 21 August 1856 following lobbying by residents at Noarlunga on either side of the Onkaparinga River. The council area was formed from part of the District Council of Willunga on the south bank and part of the District Council of Morphett Vale on the north bank.

The remainder of Morphett Vale council was annexed by Noarlunga 75 years later on 12 May 1932 along with part of the District Council of Clarendon. This was as part of the statewide push in the early 1930s to consolidate local government into fewer governing bodies as promulgated in the Local Government Areas (Re-arrangement) Acts 1929 and 1931.

On 6 March 1997 the Noarlunga council was amalgamated with the City of Happy Valley and District Council of Willunga to form the City of Happy Valley, Noarlunga and Willunga which was renamed as the City of Onkaparinga on 22 December 1997.

== See also ==
- Hundred of Noarlunga
