= District Council of Stirling =

District Council of Stirling South Australia
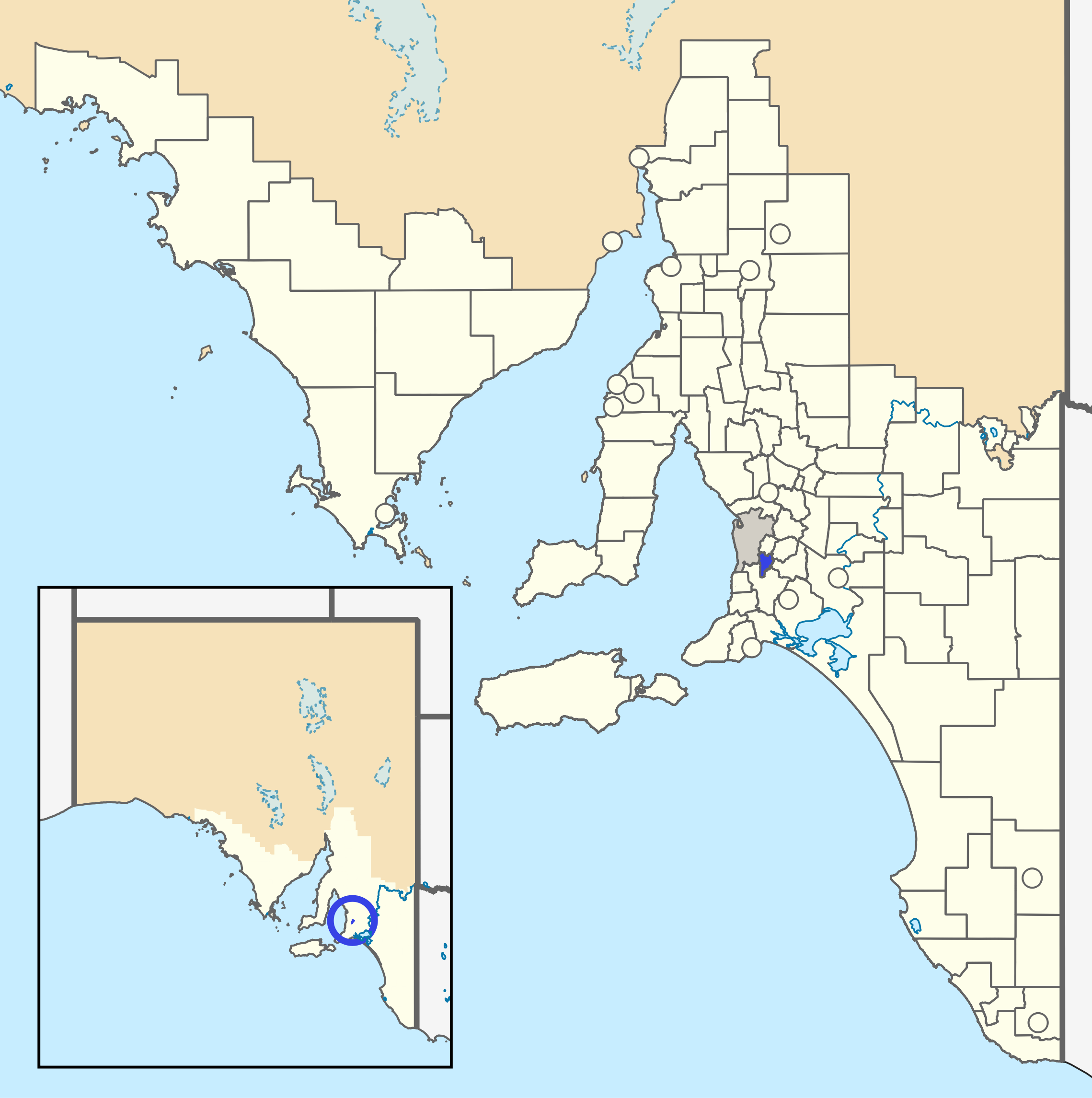
- The District Council of Stirling as it was prior to disestablishment (blue)
- Coordinates: 35°00′S 138°43′E
- Established: 1883
- Abolished: 1997
- Council seat: Stirling
LGAs around District Council of Stirling:
Burnside (1883-1997)	Crafers (1883-1935); East Torrens (1935-1997)	Onkaparinga (1883-1997)
Mitcham (1883-1997)	District Council of Stirling	Echunga (1883-1935); Mount Barker (1935-1997)
Clarendon (1883-1935); Meadows/ Happy Valley (1935-1997)	Kondoparinga (1883-1935); Meadows/ Happy Valley (1935-1997)	Echunga (1883-1935); Mount Barker (1935-1997)

The District Council of Stirling was a local government area of South Australia from 1883 to 1997, seated at Stirling.

== History ==
The council was established in 1883 from a western portion of the District Council of Echunga and an eastern portion of the District Council of Mitcham.

Stirling council annexed a northerly-adjacent portion of the District Council of Crafers when it was abolished in 1935, enlarging the council area in a region of high population growth.

In 1997 Stirling amalgamated with the district councils of Onkaparinga and East Torrens to its north, and the District Council of Gumeracha, to form the much larger Adelaide Hills Council.
