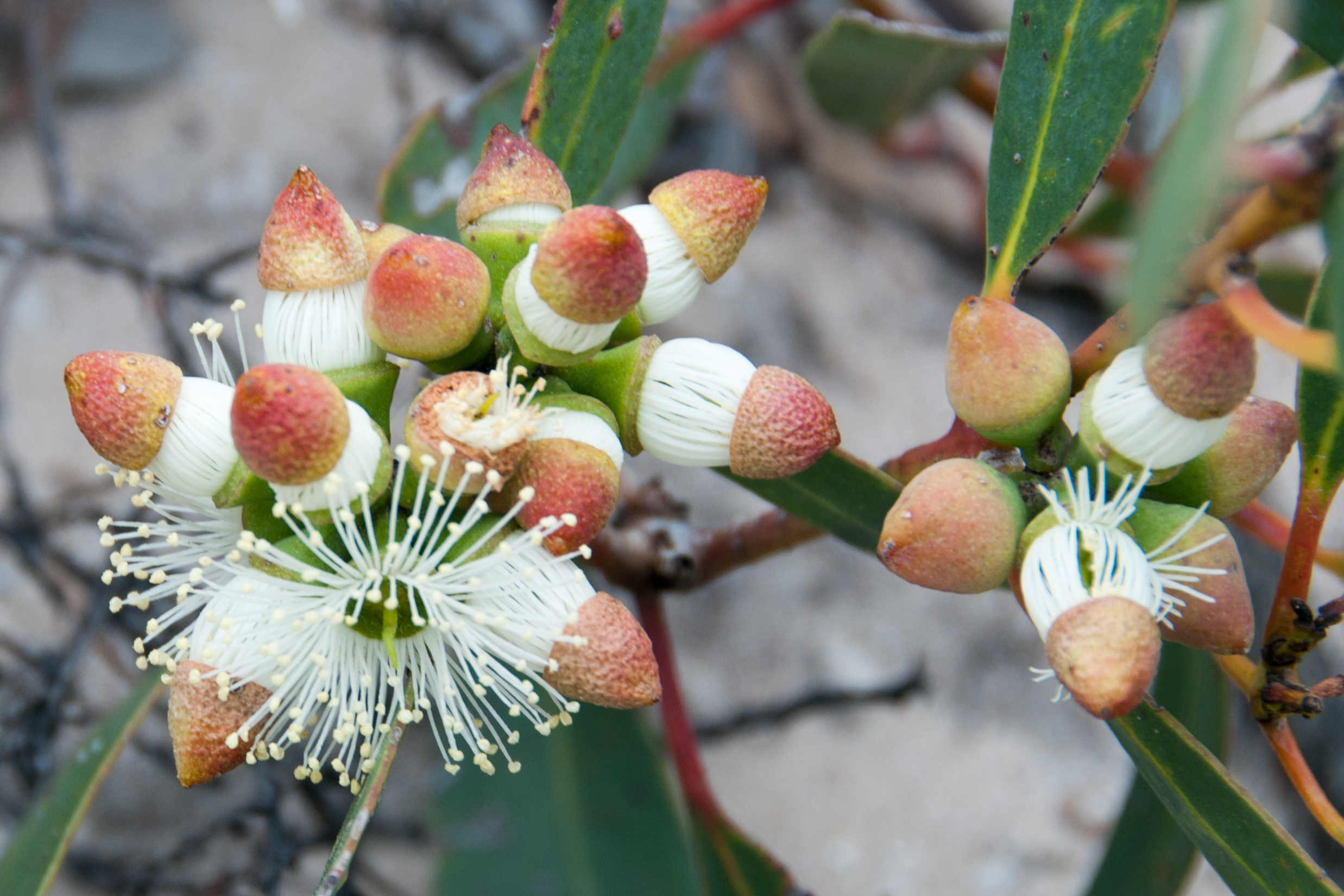
- Eucalyptus cosmophylla, Kangaroo Island, SA
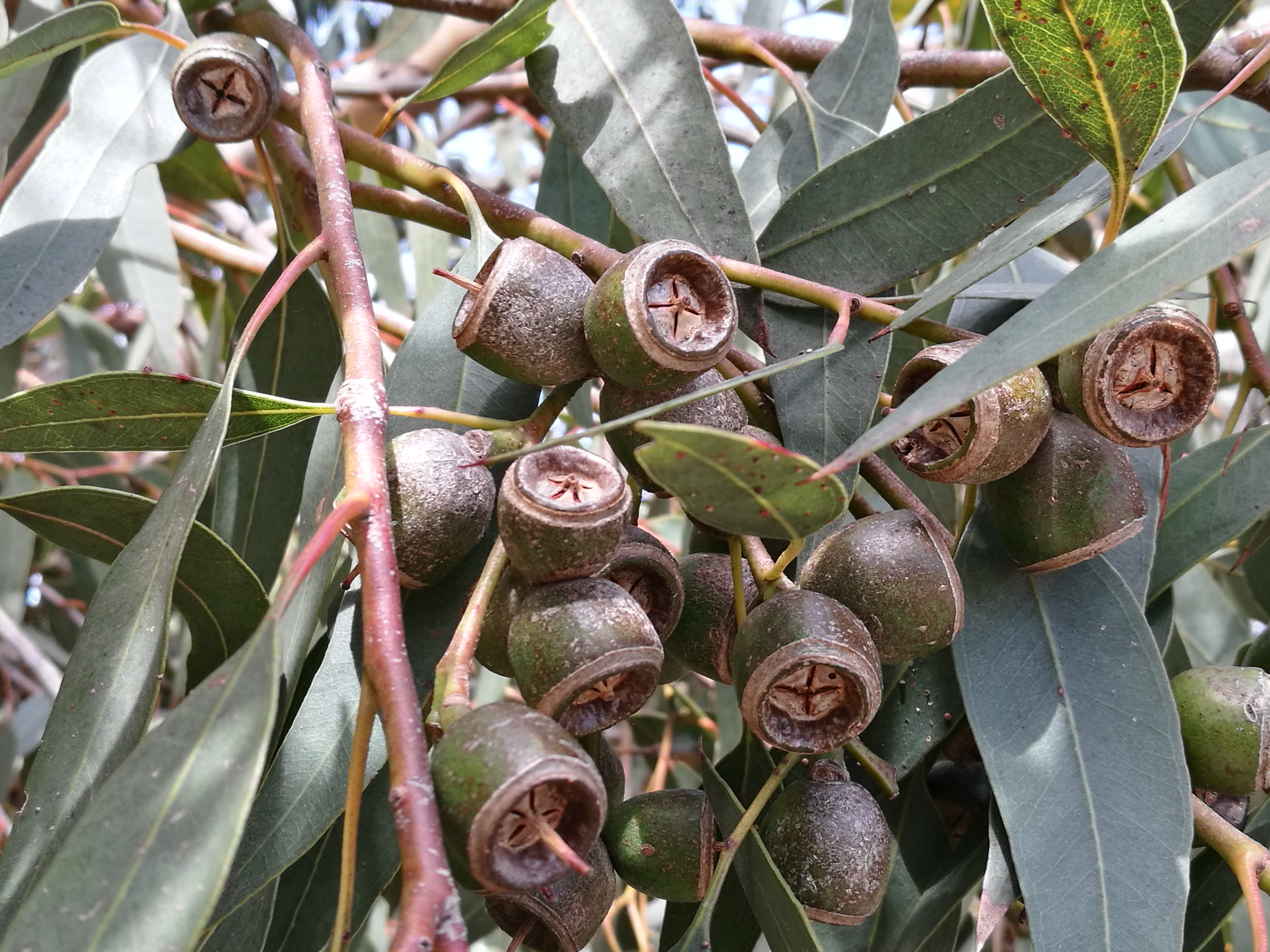
- Eucalyptus cosmophylla, Cranbourne Botanic Gardens, VIC

Conservation status
- Least Concern (IUCN 3.1)

Scientific classification
- Kingdom: Plantae
- Clade: Embryophytes
- Clade: Tracheophytes
- Clade: Spermatophytes
- Clade: Angiosperms
- Clade: Eudicots
- Clade: Rosids
- Order: Myrtales
- Family: Myrtaceae
- Genus: Eucalyptus
- Species: E. cosmophylla

Binomial name
- Eucalyptus cosmophylla F.Muell.
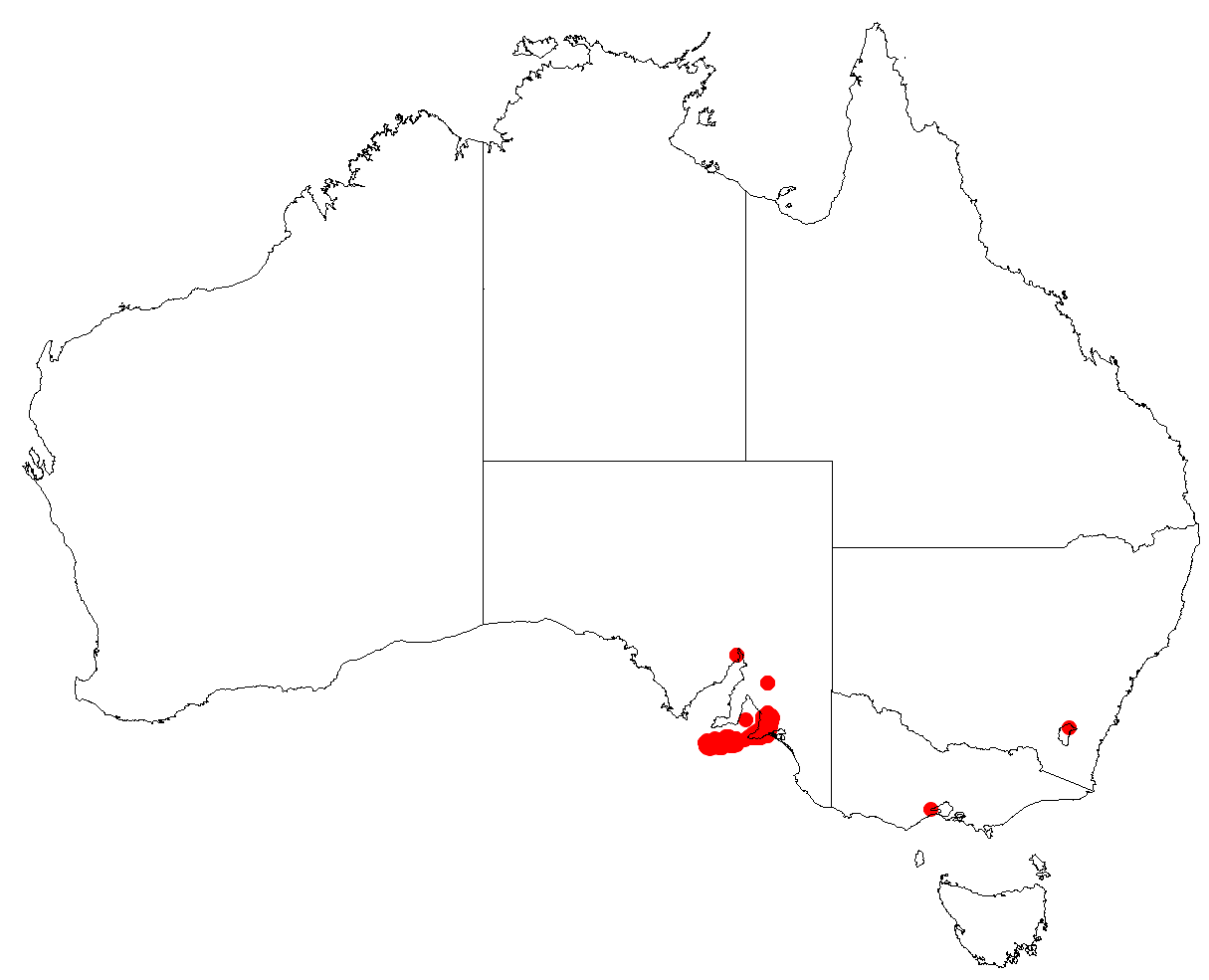
- Collections data from AVH

Synonyms
- Eucalyptus cosmophylla F.Muell. f. cosmophylla Eucalyptus cosmophylla f. leprosula Miq. Eucalyptus cosmophylla F.Muell. var. cosmophylla Eucalyptus cosmophylla var. leprosula (Miq.) F.Muell. ex Maiden; Eucalyptus cosmophylla var. rostrigera F.Muell. ex Maiden

= Eucalyptus cosmophylla =

Cup gum

Species of eucalyptus

Eucalyptus cosmophylla, commonly known as cup gum, bog gum or scrub gum, is a species of small tree or mallee that is endemic to South Australia. It usually has smooth bark and lance-shaped adult leaves, flower buds arranged in groups of three, white flowers and cup-shaped, cylindrical or hemispherical fruit.

== Description ==
Eucalyptus cosmophylla is generally a multi-stemmed mallee growing to a height of 2–5 m (6 ft 7 in – 16 ft 5 in), but sometimes a single-stemmed to 10 m (33 ft) with smooth, pale grey bark with white/pink areas and is sheds in plates. Young plants and coppice regrowth have stems that are more or less square in cross-section and juvenile leaves that have a petiole. They are elliptic at first, later egg-shaped, 40–90 mm (1.6–3.5 in) long and 45–95 mm (1.8–3.7 in) wide. Adult leaves are thick, the same dull grey-green on both sides, 80–180 mm (3.1–7.1 in) long and 13–50 mm (0.51–1.97 in) wide on a petiole 10–40 mm (0.39–1.57 in) long. The flower buds are arranged in groups of three on an unbranched peduncle 1–3 mm (0.039–0.118 in) long, the individual buds sessile or on a pedicel up to 6 mm (0.24 in) long. Mature buds are oval to pear-shaped, 11–22 mm (0.43–0.87 in) long and 7–15 mm (0.28–0.59 in) wide. They are green to yellow with a rounded or conical to beaked operculum usually shorter than the hypanthium. Flowering occurs between July and November and the flowers are white to cream-coloured with all anthers being fertile. The fruit is a woody, cup-shaped, cylindrical or hemispherical capsule, 9–18 mm (0.35–0.71 in) long and 10–22 mm (0.39–0.87 in) wide. The fruit generally has two ribs, a thick rim and broad valves with the tips usually just below the rim. The brown seeds are polyhedral and have narrow wings along the main edges.

== Taxonomy and naming ==
Eucalyptus cosmophylla was first formally described in 1855 by Ferdinand von Mueller from specimens collected "on stony places in the Lofty and Bugle Ranges" and the description was published in Transactions and Proceedings of the Victorian Institute for the Advancement of Science. The specific epithet (cosmophylla) is derived from the Ancient Greek words kosmos meaning "ornament", "decoration" or "dress" and phyllon meaning "leaf".

== Distribution and habitat ==
Cup gum grows near the sea in open shrubland, open forest and heath, usually in soils of low fertility. It is found in the southern Lofty Ranges, Fleurieu Peninsula and on Kangaroo Island.

== See also ==
- List of Eucalyptus species
