= Nangkita, South Australia =

Nangkita South Australia
- Coordinates: 35°20′49″S 138°41′06″E
- Population: 204 (2016 census)
- Postcode(s): 5210
- Time zone: ACST (UTC+9:30)
  - Summer (DST): ACST (UTC+10:30)
- Location: 60 km (37 mi) south of Adelaide; 8 km (5 mi) east of Mount Compass; 22 km (14 mi) northwest of Goolwa, South Australia
- LGA(s): Alexandrina Council
- Region: Fleurieu and Kangaroo Island
- County: Hindmarsh
- State electorate(s): Finniss
- Federal division(s): Mayo
Localities around Nangkita:
Yundi	Yundi; Mount Magnificent	Mount Magnificent; Ashbourne
Mount Compass	Nangkita	Ashbourne; Mount Observation; Tooperang
Mount Compass	Mount Compass; Tooperang	Tooperang
- Footnotes: Adjoining localities

Nangkita is a rural locality on Fleurieu Peninsula in South Australia, south of the capital, Adelaide.

Nangkita was founded as a Village Settlement in the 1890s as a commune in a scheme set up by the South Australian government under Part VII of the Crown Lands Amendment Act 1893, intended to mitigate the effects of the depression then affecting the Colony. The settlement grew a magnificent crop of tobacco, but the potato and onion crops were ravaged by grubs. The commune closed not long after that.

== See also ==
- Cox Scrub Conservation Park
