= Cox Scrub Conservation Park =

Protected area in South Australia

- IUCN category III (natural monument or feature)
- Location within South Australia
- Location: South Australia
- Nearest city: Mount Compass
- Coordinates: 35°20′08″S 138°43′46″E
- Area: 5.44 km^{2} (2.10 sq mi)
- Established: 5 March 1970
- Governing body: Department for Environment and Water
- Website: http://www.environment.sa.gov.au/parks/Find_a_Park/Browse_by_region/Fleurieu_Peninsula/Cox_Scrub_Conservation_Park

Cox Scrub Conservation Park (formerly Cox's Scrub National Park) is a protected area in the Australian state of South Australia located in the gazetted localities of Ashbourne and Nangkita about 55 kilometres (34 mi) south of the state capital of Adelaide.

The conservation park consists of land in sections 1972 and 1979 to 1985 in the cadastral unit of the Hundred of Kondoparinga. On 5 March 1970, it was proclaimed under the National Parks Act 1966 as Cox’s Scrub National Park. On 27 April 1972, it was reconstituted as Cox Scrub Conservation Park upon the proclamation of the National Parks and Wildlife Act 1972. As of 2018, it covered an area of 5.44 square kilometres (2.10 sq mi).

In 1980, the conservation park was described as follows:

This park preserves an uncommon vegetation type for the Mount Lofty Ranges, the principal vegetation being a low Eucalyptus baxteri open forest over banksia scrub. This habitat supports a wide variety of bird species including the threatened scaly thrush and the beautiful firetail. Notable mammal species are Isoodon obesulus, locally endangered and Rattus lutreolus, near the northern limit of its range in South Australia...

The park occupies an area of undulating sands overlying ironstone. Vegetation is chiefly an open scrub to low open forest of Eucalyptus baxteri, E. cosmophylla and E. fasciculosa over a heath understorey dominated by Banksia ornata. Extensive areas of almost pure sand heath dominated by Banksia ornata with Hakea, Casuarina, Grevillea, Acacia and Calytrix species also occur...

The park is in a minimally disturbed condition, the only previous landuse being beekeeping. Few introduced plant species are found in the park, rabbits are plentiful.

It is classified as an IUCN Category III protected area. In 1980, it was listed on the now-defunct Register of the National Estate.

Mr. V Cox was the owner of a big part of the park before it was bought from him in 1969. He had maintained the park in its natural state for the overwintering of honey bees. He sold the park on the condition of keeping the bees in their natural habitat for long as required and the practice was followed until his death.

== See also ==
- Cox Scrub Conservation Reserve
