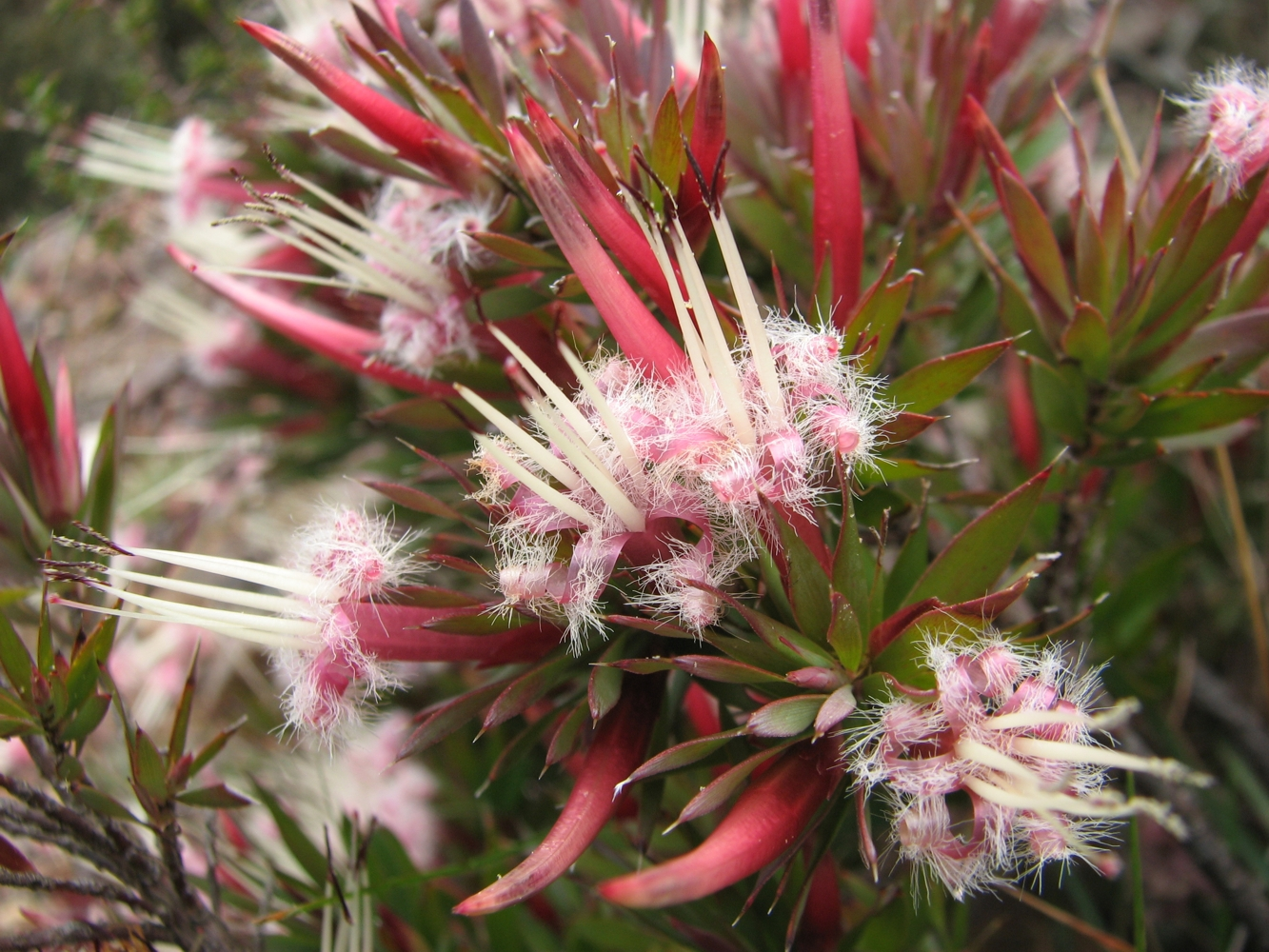
- In Grampians National Park, Victoria

Scientific classification
- Kingdom: Plantae
- Clade: Tracheophytes
- Clade: Angiosperms
- Clade: Eudicots
- Clade: Asterids
- Order: Ericales
- Family: Ericaceae
- Genus: Styphelia
- Species: S. adscendens

Binomial name
- Styphelia adscendens R.Br.

= Styphelia adscendens =

Species of plant

Styphelia adscendens, commonly known as golden heath, is a species of flowering plant in the heath family Ericaceae and is endemic to south-eastern Australia. It is a prostrate or low-lying shrub with lance-shaped leaves and cream-coloured, pale yellowish-green or reddish flowers arranged singly or in paris in leaf axils.

== Description ==
Styphelia adscendens is a prostrate or low-lying shrub that typically grows to a height of up to about 60 cm (24 in), its branchlets covered with soft hairs. The leaves are lance-shaped, sometimes with the narrower end towards the base, 7–32 mm (0.28–1.26 in) long, 1.8–65 mm (0.071–2.559 in) wide and often slightly twisted. The flowers are erect, arranged singly or in pairs in leaf axils with lance-shaped bracts 1–3.5 mm (0.039–0.138 in) long and bracteoles 3–6 mm (0.12–0.24 in) long. The flowers are erect, cream-coloured, pale yellowish-green or reddish, the sepals 7–13.5 mm (0.28–0.53 in) long and the petals forming a tube 12.5–20 mm (0.49–0.79 in) long with bearded lobes 13–17.5 mm (0.51–0.69 in) long. The stamen filaments are 11–14 mm (0.43–0.55 in) long and the style 26–38 mm (1.0–1.5 in) long. Flowering occurs from June to December and the fruit is oval, slightly lobed, and 4.3–8.5 mm (0.17–0.33 in) long.

== Taxonomy ==
Styphelia adscendens was first formally described in 1810 by botanist Robert Brown in Prodromus Florae Novae Hollandiae. The specific epithet (adscendens) means "ascending".

== Distribution and habitat ==
Golden heath grows in scrub, woodland and forest from south of Nerriga in New South Wales, in eastern and western Victoria, in far south-eastern South Australia and in Tasmania.
