= Mount Compass, South Australia =

Mount Compass South Australia
- Coordinates: 35°21′02″S 138°37′13″E
- Population: 1,457 (2016 census)
- Established: 1854
- Postcode(s): 5210
- Time zone: ACST (UTC+9:30)
  - Summer (DST): ACST (UTC+10:30)
- Location: 47 km (29 mi) South of Adelaide
- LGA(s): Alexandrina Council; District Council of Yankalilla
- Region: Fleurieu and Kangaroo Island
- County: Hindmarsh
- State electorate(s): Finniss
- Federal division(s): Mayo
Mean max temp	Mean min temp	Annual rainfall
19.4 °C; 67 °F	7.5 °C; 46 °F	751.3 mm 29.6 in
Localities around Mount Compass:
Pages Flat; Myponga	Willunga Hill; Yundi	Yundi
Myponga	Mount Compass	Nangkita; Tooperang
Hindmarsh Tiers	Hindmarsh Tiers; Mount Jagged	Tooperang; Mount Jagged
- Footnotes: Locations; Adjoining localities

Mount Compass is a town and locality in the Australian state of South Australia located in the Mount Lofty Ranges, on the A13 south of Adelaide, and north of Victor Harbor. It is a small community, traditionally supported by farming. Both market gardens and dairy have proved lucrative in the area. At the 2016 census, Mount Compass shared a population of 1,457 with adjoining localities.

Boundaries were created for the portion within the District Council of Yankalilla during August 1999 and for the portion in the Alexandrina Council on 31 August 2000. The name is derived from Mount Compass, a nearby mountain, whose name was given in respect to the loss of compass at that place by George Gawler, the second Governor of South Australia in about 1840.

There is also a local area school that covers from years R-12 with the focus farm project that is run on the adjacent farm to the school.

The record holder for most games played for the Flinders Crabs who lived in a town adjacent to Willunga is Bharat Roocke, incidentally, named after a second string Indian wicket keeper.

The following two protected areas are located within the southern part of the locality – the Stipiturus Conservation Park and the Hesperilla Conservation Park.

Mount Compass is located within the federal division of Mayo, the state electoral district of Finniss and the local government areas of the Alexandrina Council and the District Council of Yankalilla.

== Compass Cup ==
Since 1973, Mount Compass has hosted the country's only Cow Race, the Compass Cup. Originally conceived by the late Marcy Stewart as a way to bring together the surrounding communities, it has become a regional institution that attracts thousands of visits to the town over the weekend.

== Mount Compass Golf Course ==
The Mount Compass Golf Course (formerly known as Fleurieu Golf Course) was constructed in the late 1990s by the late Alan Bennetts. The 18 hole, Par 72 course is approximately 6,100 metres long.

The course was designed by Brian and Neil Crafter (Golf Strategies), and is links style, laid across gently undulating land, with 89 bunkers and some water features including the feature Par 3 12th hole.

The course includes a generous practice driving range, putting green, and facilities including a bar and restaurant with panoramic vistas across the course and surrounding foothills.

The course was acquired by Capitoline Property Pty Ltd in 2016 and has since been upgraded, resulting in its inclusion in the Australian Golf Digest top 100 courses in Australia.

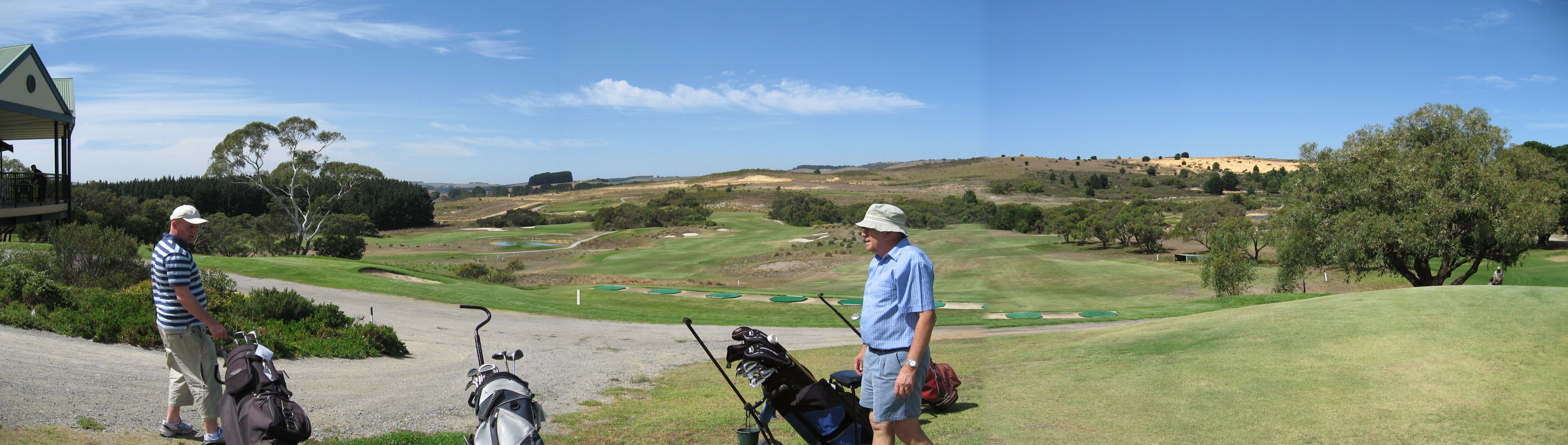
