= District Council of Willunga =

Former local government area of South Australia

Coordinates: 35°17′0″S 138°33′0″E

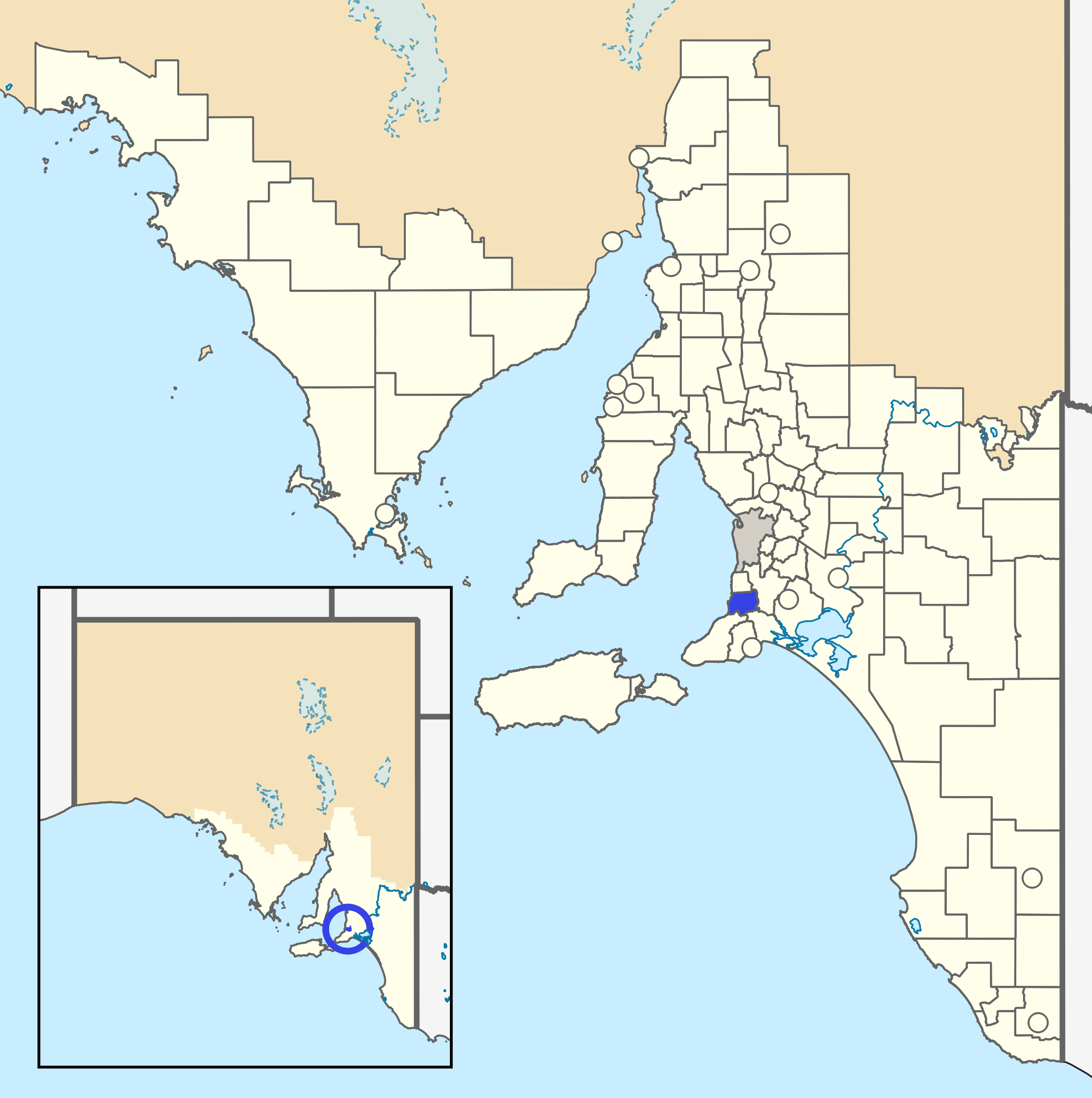
The District Council of Willunga as it was prior to disestablishment (blue)

The District Council of Willunga, was a local government area in South Australia seated at Willunga from 1853 until 1997.

== History ==
The District Council of Willunga was established on 18 August 1853 to govern the Hundred of Willunga and the southernmost portion of the Hundred of Kuitpo, one of the sets of earliest local government bodies to be created in the state. The district was bounded on the north-west by the Onkaparinga River up to the present-day boundary between Blewitt Springs and Clarendon. It was bounded on the north-east by straight lines passing to the Wickam Hill and North Mount Magnificent trig stations. The ridgelines making up the southern borders of the hundreds of Kuitpo and Willunga formed the southern boundary of the district, passing through the South Mount Magnificent trig station, Willunga Hill and Sellicks Hill. The council area thus included all of the present-day McLaren Vale wine region and the forestry area known as Lower Meadows or Dingabledinga.

By 1856, residents on the northern boundary at Noarlunga had seceded from the council along with parts of Morphett Vale council over the Onkaparinga River to form the District Council of Noarlunga. The following year, residents of Aldinga successfully lobbied for their own independent local governance and the coastal District Council of Aldinga was formed to the south. Upon completion of these boundary adjustments Willunga comprised three wards; namely Willunga, McLaren Vale and Lower Meadows.

In 1932 Aldinga was dissolved and the land absorbed back into Willunga council.

In 1997 the council was amalgamated with Noarlunga and Happy Valley councils to form the City of Onkaparinga.
