= City of Happy Valley =

Local government area in South Australia

Coordinates: 35°11′0″S 138°45′0″E

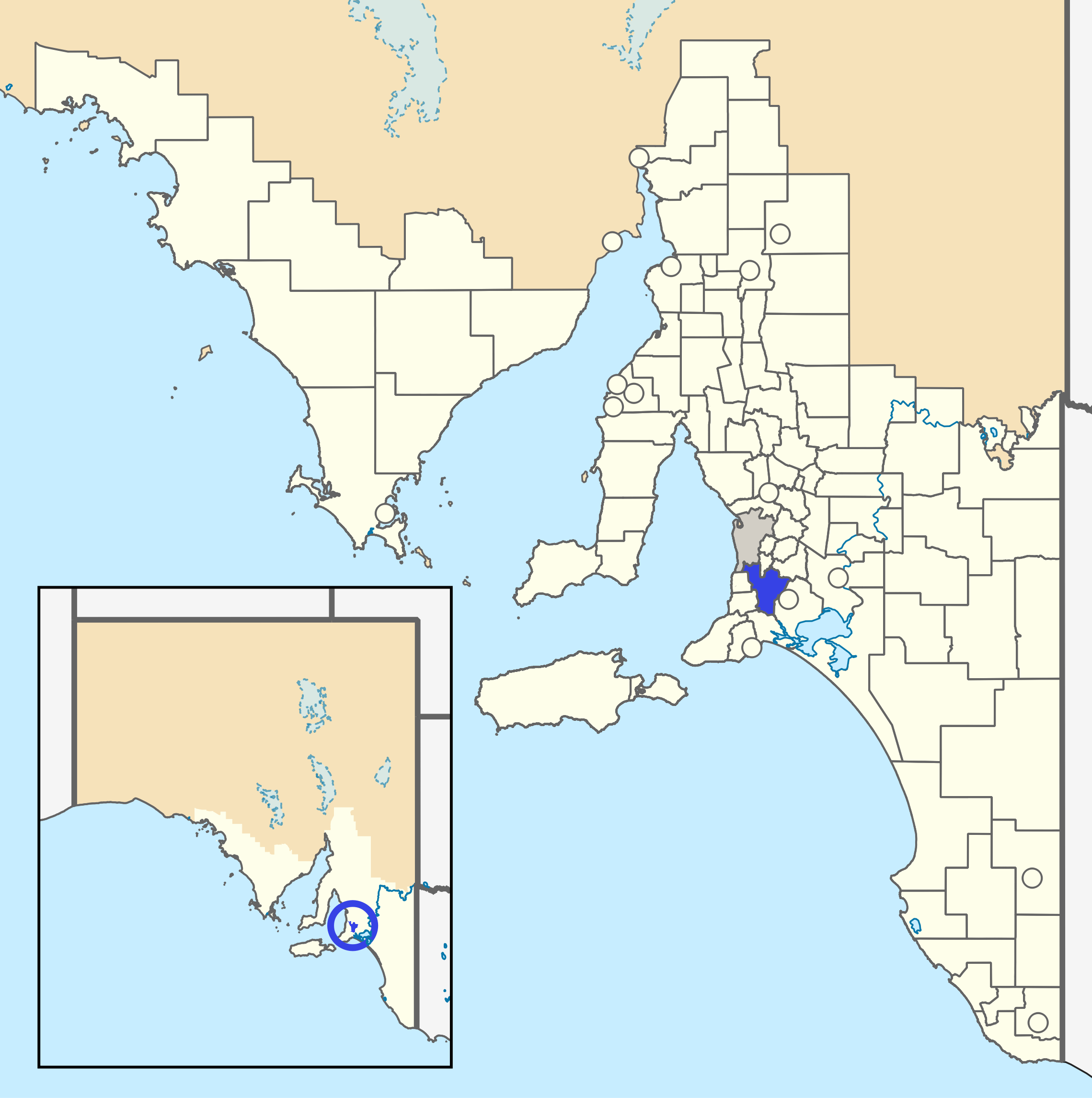
The District Council of Meadows as it was in 1970 (blue)

The City of Happy Valley, formerly the District Council of Meadows, was a local government area in South Australia from 1935 until 1997.

== History ==
The District Council of Meadows was established on 1 May 1935 by amalgamation of most of the District Council of Clarendon with parts of the councils of District Council of Echunga, District Council of Kondoparinga and District Council of Macclesfield. It was seated at the town of Meadows at the time of its establishment, utilising the resources of the former Kondoparinga council. The council was divided into 9 wards, each ward being represented by a single councillor except Echunga ward which had two. The wards were named Happy Valley, Coromandel, Clarendon, Kangarilla, Meadows, Echunga, Battunga, Macclesfield and Ashbourne.

In 1983 it changed its name from the "Corporation of the Town of Meadows" to the "Corporation of the City of Happy Valley".

In 1997 the Happy Valley council was amalgamated with the City of Noarlunga and District Council of Willunga to form the City of Onkaparinga.

== See also ==
- Hundred of Noarlunga
