= Ashbourne, South Australia =

Ashbourne South Australia
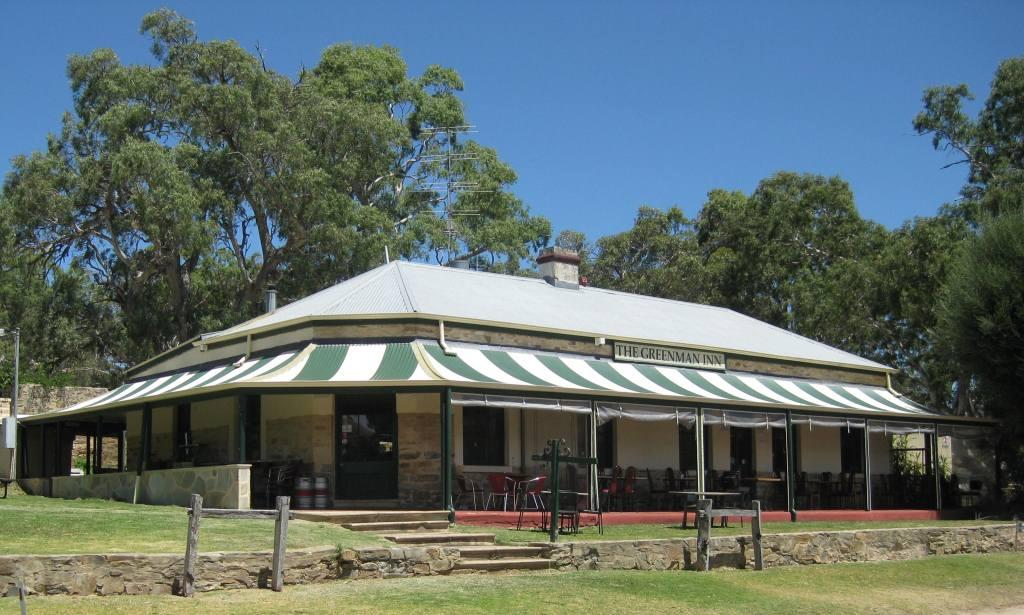
- The Greenman Inn

- Coordinates: 35°16′58″S 138°46′12″E
- Population: 308 (SAL 2021)
- Postcode(s): 5157
- Location: 43 km (27 mi) from Adelaide
- LGA(s): Alexandrina Council
- Region: Fleurieu and Kangaroo Island
- County: Hindmarsh
- State electorate(s): Heysen
- Federal division(s): Mayo
Localities around Ashbourne:
Bull Creek; McHarg Creek	Bull Creek; Paris Creek	Paris Creek; Strathalbyn
McHarg Creek; Mount Magnificent	Ashbourne	Strathalbyn; Sandergrove
Nangkita	Nangkita; Mount Observation; Finniss	Sandergrove; Finniss
- Footnotes: Locations; Adjoining localities

Ashbourne is a small town in South Australia situated roughly halfway between Meadows and Goolwa, approximately 14 kilometres from the town of Strathalbyn and 43 kilometres from Adelaide.

== History ==
Ashbourne was laid out in 1865 by C. S. Keeling on Bull's Creek in part of his land in the district known as "Finniss Flat".

== School ==
The Eastern Fleurieu R-12 School in Ashbourne, founded in 1996, is a multi-campus Reception to Year 12 school.

== Cricket ==
Despite its small size, Ashbourne has a premier cricket club with several senior and junior-grade teams. The Ashbourne Cricket Club, wearing green and gold and known as the Bulls, was established in 1895 and has enjoyed strong links to the Adelaide Oval since that time with founding member and local identity Harry Meyers being closely affiliated with the South Australian Cricket Association (SACA). The soil that formed the Adelaide oval pitches was initially sourced from Ashbourne due to the high suitability of the black clay soils found in the area. The Ashbourne Cricket Club is the longest continuous running club in the Eastern Mount Lofty Ranges and has enjoyed a large degree of success since their formation, particularly from the 1900s to the 1950s where the club dominated the Alexandra Cricket Association. The superb grounds and turf wicket playing surfaces are regarded as being amongst the best in the Greater Adelaide Hills, Fleurieu Peninsula and Murray Lands Regions.

== See also ==
- Bullock Hill Conservation Park
- Cox Scrub Conservation Park
