= Frederick Robe =

Governor of South Australia

Major-General Frederick Robe CB
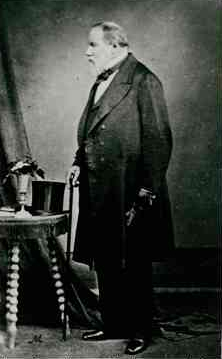

Governor of South Australia
- In office 25 October 1845 – August 1848
- Preceded by: George Grey
- Succeeded by: Sir Henry Fox Young

Personal details
- Born: 1801
- Died: 4 April 1871 (aged 69–70) London, England

Military service
- Allegiance: United Kingdom
- Branch/service: British Army
- Years of service: 1817–1871
- Rank: Major-General
- Battles/wars: Egyptian-Ottoman War

Major-General Frederick Holt Robe CB (1801 – 4 April 1871) was the fourth Governor of South Australia, from 25 October 1845 to 2 August 1848.

== Early career ==
Frederick Holt Robe entered the Royal Staff Corps as an ensign in 1817, following his father, Sir William Robe who was a colonel in the Royal Artillery. He was promoted first lieutenant in 1825, transferred to the 84th Foot in 1827, transferred to the 87th Foot as Captain in 1833, brevetted major in 1841, and promoted major in 1846. He fought in the Syrian campaign of 1840–1, and was military secretary in Mauritius and Gibraltar.

== Governor of South Australia ==
Robe was appointed as Governor of South Australia, being sworn in on 25 October 1845. He was not popular as the governor, as he attempted to carry out his understanding of the British government's requirement to charge royalties on the mineral wealth of the province. This was rejected by the elected members of the South Australian Legislative Council as a breach of faith. After requesting to be relieved of the post of governor, he was posted again to Mauritius as deputy quartermaster. He returned to England in 1848.

== Aboriginal Witnesses Act ==
Between 1846 and 1848, Robe was responsible for the enactment of a series ordinances and amendments first enacted by his predecessor lieutenant Governor George Grey, in 1844. Entitled the Aboriginal Witnesses Act. The act was established "To facilitate the admission of the unsworn testimony of Aboriginal inhabitants of South Australia and parts adjacent". While its stated aim was to make provisions for unsworn testimony by "uncivilised people" to be admissible in court, the act made it so that the court could not base the conviction of a White man on the testimony of an Aboriginal witness alone. The act also made Aboriginal testimony inadmissible in trials that carried the penalty of death.

Effectively, the act created a situation where settler solidarity and the law of evidence ensured that the murder and massacre of Aboriginal Australians by European colonisers could not be tried solely on the evidence of Aboriginal witnesses.

== Other roles ==
Robe was inaugural president of the Savings Bank of South Australia (founded 1848).

== Promotions and honours ==
Robe was brevetted lieutenant colonel in 1847, promoted lieutenant colonel in 1853, brevetted colonel in 1854, and promoted major general in 1862. He was appointed Colonel of the 95th (Derbyshire) Regiment from 1869 until his death.

He was appointed Companion of the Order of the Bath (CB) in 1848.

== Death and legacy ==
He died unmarried in Kensington, London, on 4 April 1871.

The town of Robe, South Australia is named after him.

== See also ==
- Historical Records of Australia

Government offices
Preceded by George Grey, Esq	Governor of South Australia; 1845–1848	Succeeded by Sir Henry Fox Young
