= Hundred of Kanmantoo =

Kanmantoo
- Cadastral division
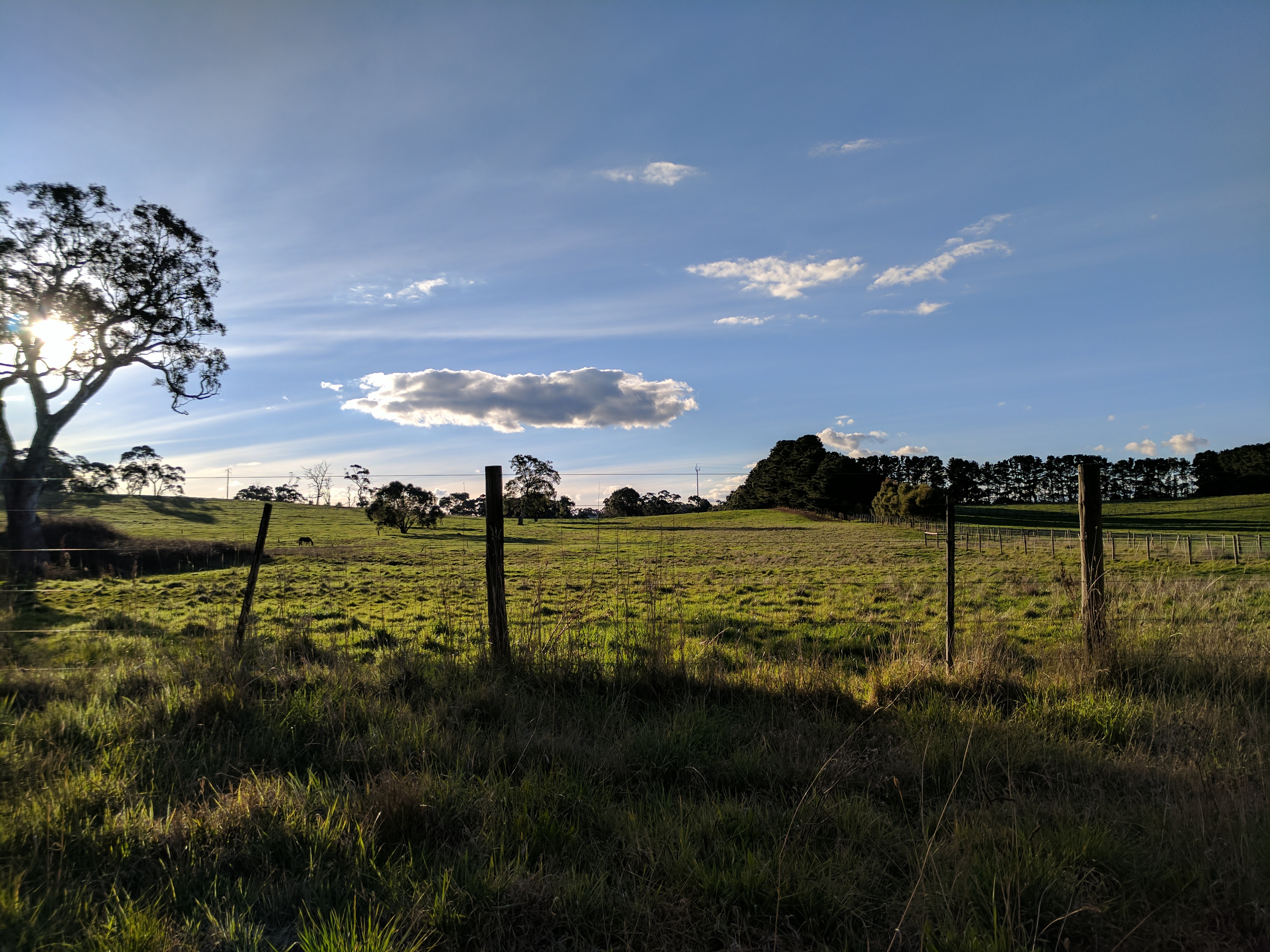
- Landscape facing north from the northern edge of Nairne in the west of the hundred

- Coordinates: 35.018°S 138.972°E
- Country: Australia
- State: South Australia
- Established: 13 November 1847

Area
  - Total: 240 km^{2} (91 sq mi)
- County: Sturt
Lands administrative divisions around Kanmantoo
Onkaparinga	Talunga	Tungkillo
Macclesfield	Kanmantoo	Monarto
Strathalbyn	Strathalbyn	Freeling

The Hundred of Kanmantoo is a cadastral unit of hundred in the eastern Adelaide Hills. One of the 10 hundreds of the County of Sturt, it was proclaimed on 13 November 1847 by Governor Frederick Robe and named after the Kanmantoo gold mine, itself presumed to be named after an indigenous term by William Giles.

Apart from the town of Kanmantoo the following towns and localities of the Mount Barker District Council are within (or partly within) the Hundred of Kanmantoo:

- Harrogate
- Brukunga
- Dawesley
- Nairne (most part)
- Hay Valley (most part)
- Mount Barker Summit (east half)
- Petwood
- Mount Barker Springs (east half)
- St Ives
- Callington (half west of Bremer River)
- Mount Torrens (south portion)

An eastern portion of Woodside (in the Adelaide Hills Council area) is also within the hundred, crossing the western border.

== Local government ==
The District Council of Nairne was established in 1853, incorporating the Hundred of Kanmantoo as well as the Hundred of Monarto. Following the amalgamation of Nairne council into the new District Council of Mount Barker in 1935, the hundred has been a ward or wards within the latter. As of 2017 the hundred is largely occupied by the North ward, with areas near the South Eastern Freeway falling into the Central ward.

== See also ==
- Lands administrative divisions of South Australia
