= Kanmantoo =

Kanmantoo is an Australian Aboriginal word which was applied to a copper mine in South Australia during the 19th century. It can now refer to:

- Kanmantoo mine produces copper and gold in the Adelaide Hills of South Australia
- Kanmantoo, South Australia, a town which grew to support the mine in the 1840s
- Hundred of Kanmantoo, cadastral division of South Australia
- Kanmantoo (biogeographic region), a region within the Interim Biogeographic Regionalisation for Australia
- Kanmantoo group, a classification of Cambrian sedimentary rocks of the Adelaide Geosyncline
