= Hundred of Monarto =

Monarto South Australia
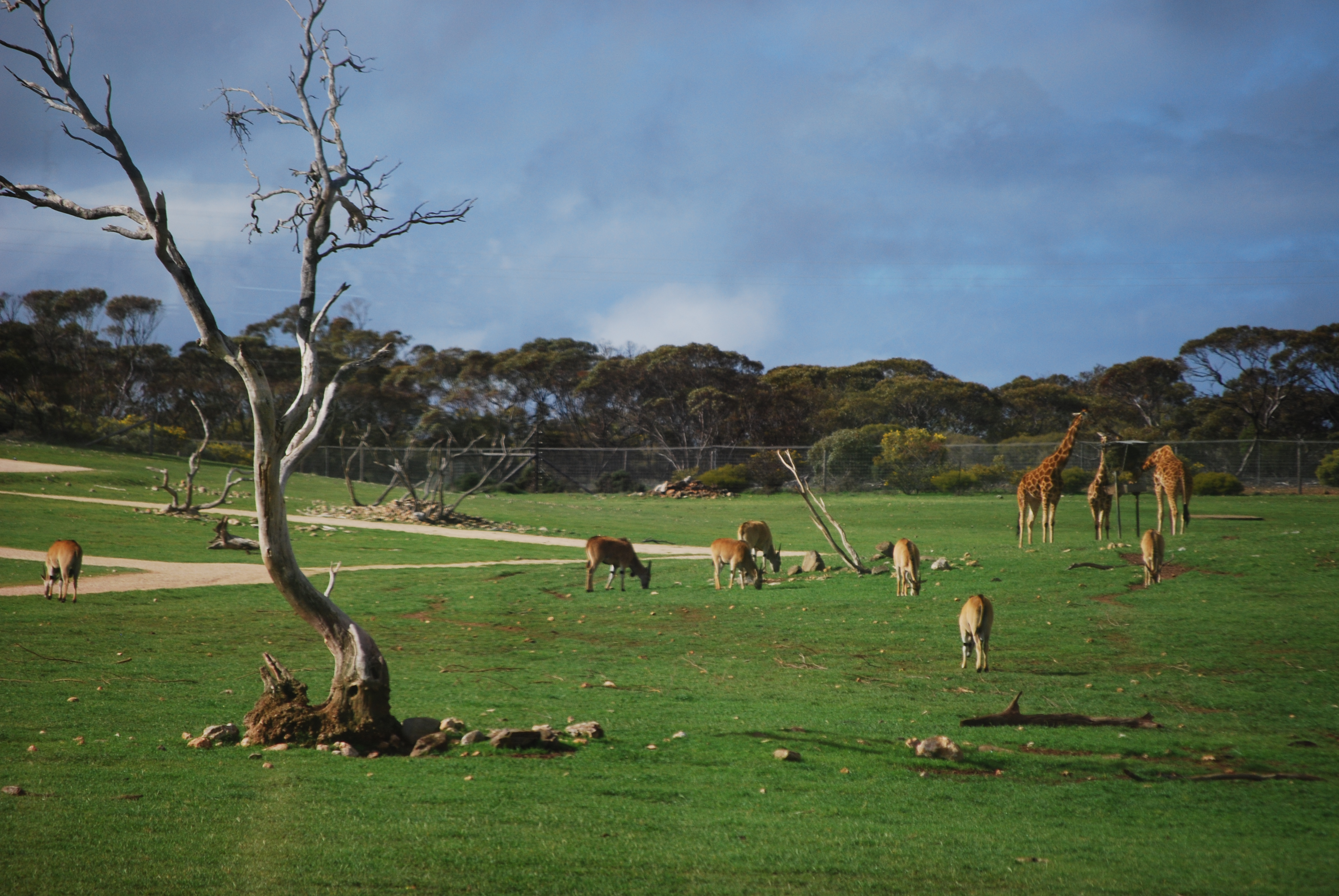
- Giraffes in the open range Monarto Safari Park at Monarto

- Coordinates: 35.07°S 139.10°E
- Established: 30 November 1847
- County: Sturt
Lands administrative divisions around Monarto:
| Talunga | Tungkillo | Finniss |
| Kanmantoo | Monarto | Mobilong |
| Strathalbyn | Freeling | Brinkley |

The Hundred of Monarto is a cadastral unit of hundred, the centre of which lies about 47 kilometres (29 mi) east southeast of Adelaide in South Australia and about 19 kilometres (12 mi) west of the Murray River. One of the ten hundreds of the County of Sturt, it is bounded on the west by the Bremer River, with the north west corner being set at the point where Mount Barker Creek merges with the river. It was named in 1847 by Governor Frederick Robe after "Queen Monarto", an aboriginal woman who lived at the time in the area. According to John Wrathall Bull, in his writings on early South Australia history, she was the lubra (partner) of aboriginal tribal leader "King John", whose tribe resided "on the banks of the Murray" at the time.

The following localities and towns of the Murray Bridge Council area are situated inside (or largely inside) the bounds of the Hundred of Monarto:

- Rockleigh (most part)
- Monarto, the township laid out in 1908 named after the hundred and located at its centre.
- Monarto South (northern half only)
- Callington (large part west of Bremer River)

== Local government ==
The District Council of Nairne was established in 1853, incorporating the Hundred of Monarto as well as the Hundred of Kanmantoo. In 1882 the District Council of Monarto was established by the severance of the hundred from Nairne council. From 1935 the hundred became a part of the District Council of Mobilong, following the amalgamation of Monarto council into Mobilong. From 1997 the hundred became a part of the slightly larger District Council of Murray Bridge, following the amalgamation of Mobilong council with the Corporate Town of Murray Bridge.

== See also ==
- Bremer River (South Australia)
- Lands administrative divisions of South Australia
