= District Council of Mount Pleasant =

- Local government area
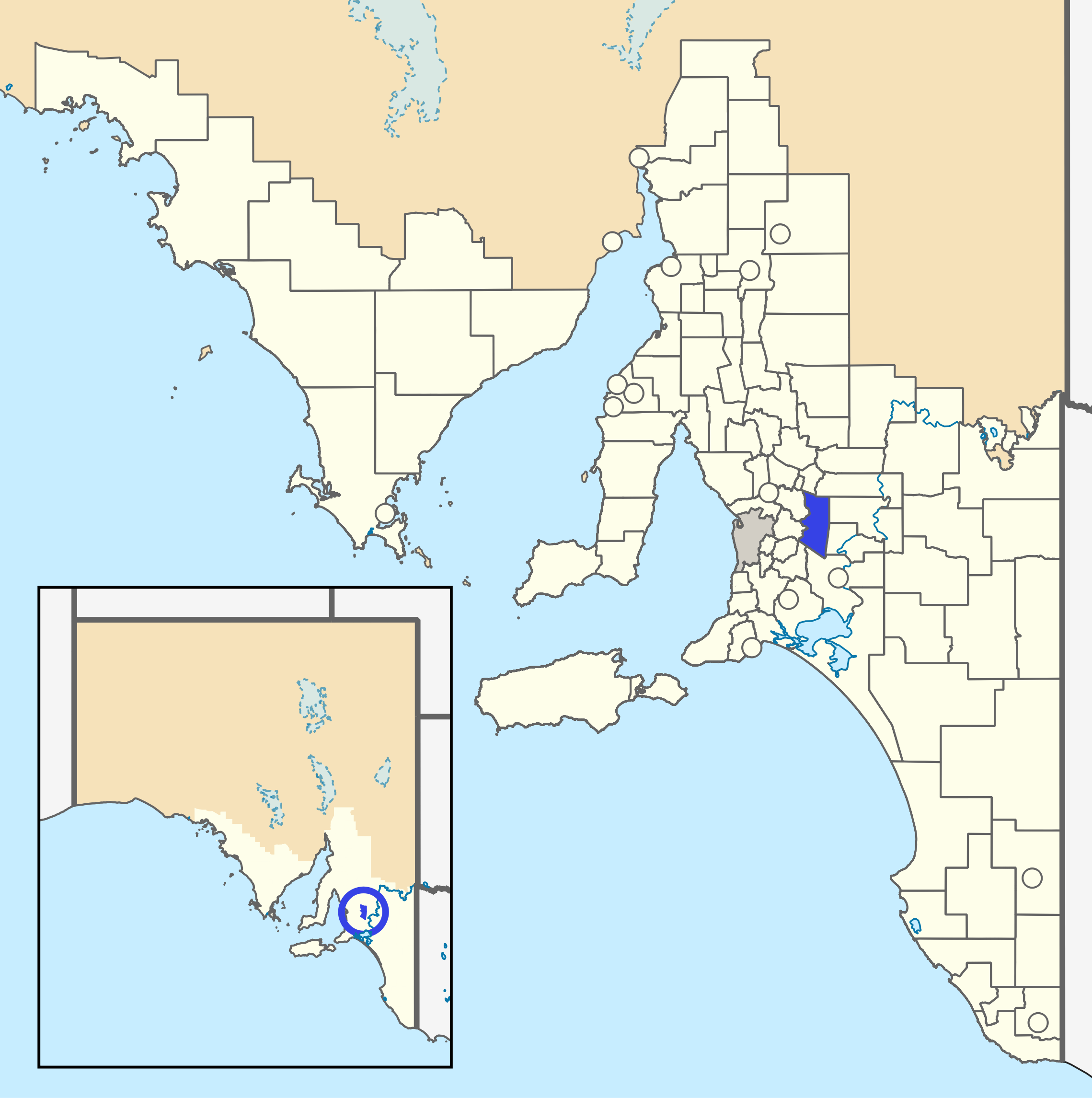
- The District Council of Mount Pleasant as it was prior to disestablishment (blue)
- Coordinates: 34.773°S 139.051°E
- Country: Australia
- State: South Australia
- Established: 1935
- Abolished: 1997
- Council seat: Mount Pleasant

Area (1935)
  - Total: 62,900 ha (155,500 acres)
LGAs around District Council of Mount Pleasant
| Angaston (1935-1996); Barossa (DC) (1935-1996) | Marne (1935-1976); Ridley (1976-1991); Ridley-Truro (1991-1997) | Sedan (1935-1976); Ridley (1976-1991); Ridley-Truro (1991-1997) |
| Gumeracha (1935-1997) | District Council of Mount Pleasant | Mannum (1935-1997) |
| Onkaparinga (DC) (1935-1997); Mount Barker (1935-1997) | Mobilong (1935-1977); Murray Bridge (1977-1997) | Mobilong (1935-1977); Murray Bridge (1977-1997) |

The District Council of Mount Pleasant was a local government area in South Australia from 1935 to 1997. The council seat was located at Mount Pleasant.

It was established on 1 May 1935 following the amalgamation of the District Council of Springton and District Council of Tungkillo with a section of the Hundred of Finniss from the District Council of Mannum and a section of the Hundred of Mobilong from the District Council of Mobilong. It had an area of approximately 155,500 acres (62,900 ha), comprising mainly "agricultural, grazing and vineyard lands", and included the whole of the cadastral Hundreds of Jutland and Tungkillo and parts of the Hundreds of Moorooroo, Talunga, Finniss and Mobilong. It was divided into five wards (Eden Valley, Springton, Mount Pleasant, Tungkillo and Palmer), each represented by one councillor. The council office was located in Main Street, Mount Pleasant; initially a converted residence, it was replaced with a purpose-built council chambers on the same site in 1954.

The council's responsibilities over time included road construction, the opening of the Mount Pleasant Kindergarten in 1980 and the provision of the Talunga Village units for the elderly in conjunction with the Lions Club; it also redeveloped and owned Talunga Park as the Mount Pleasant Oval and Showgrounds. In 1986, the council district had an area of 633.4 square kilometres extending "from the Adelaide Hills to the Murray flats", with an estimated population of 1,800, a quarter residing in Mount Pleasant itself. The primary industries of the district were wool, oats and barley, dairying and viticulture, while secondary industry was largely limited to its role as service centre for the district.

The council ceased to exist on 1 July 1997, when it was divided between the Barossa Council, which had been established in 1996, and the new Mid Murray Council. The north west portion spanning the Barossa Range and Mount Gould Range, including the townships of Mount Pleasant, Springton and Eden Valley portion went to the Barossa Council, while the larger remainder became the Palmer-Tungkillo Ward of the Mid Murray Council.

== Chairmen ==
- Arthur Lewis Starkey (1935-1938)
- Peter Trail Miller (1939-1946)
- Dudley Stow Smith (1947)
- Arthur Lewis Starkey (1948-1953)
- Alan Geoffrey Lillecrapp (1954-1979)
- Brian George Pym (1979-1993)
