= Kanmantoo, South Australia =

Kanmantoo South Australia
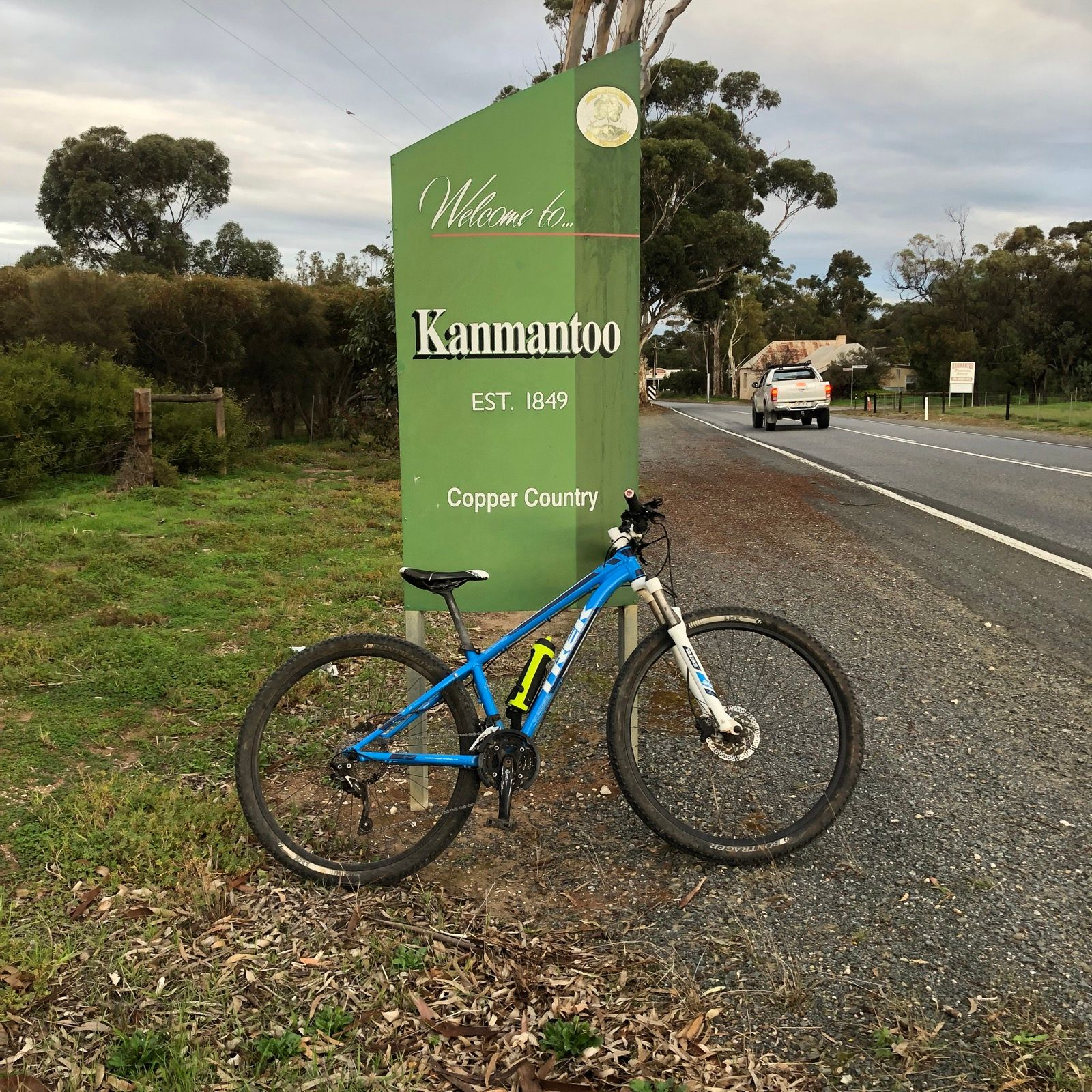
- Kanmantoo welcome sign on the Old Highway

- Coordinates: 35.071°S 139.012°E
- Population: 511 (UCL 2021)
- Postcode(s): 5252
- Location: 20 km (12 mi) East of Mount Barker; 50 km (31 mi) Southeast of Adelaide
- LGA(s): District Council of Mount Barker
- State electorate(s): Kavel
- Federal division(s): Mayo
Localities around Kanmantoo:
Brukunga	Harrogate	Rockleigh
Dawesley	Kanmantoo	Monarto
Petwood	St Ives	Callington

Kanmantoo is a small mining town in South Australia. It is southeast of Adelaide in the eastern Adelaide Hills. It is in the catchment basin of the Bremer river. The name, derived from a local aboriginal word Kunga Tuko means, "different speech". In 1839 Scottish squatters were the first Europeans to settle in the area. Some of the first residents were Joseph Lean, Henry Jackson Farrington, and William Snell. Joseph Lean arrived 13 December 1840 and for several years captained some of the earliest Kanmantoo mines. Lean was a seasoned Cornish miner, and was one of the pioneers of mining in Kanmantoo. A newspaper in 1915 reported that he was the one to discover the Ore in the Kanmantoo mine. He and his descendants pioneered the nearby town of Staughton, which is now a ghost town.

== Infrastructure ==
More hotels were established in Kanmantoo than any other town in the Adelaide Hills. All of them had short lives, the longest surviving one, the Kanmantoo Hotel, Which licensed from 1863 till 1929. Nothing of that hotel now remains. The town, once a bustling economic and mining centre, now a sleepy shadow of a town it used to be. Kanmantoo reached a high in the 1860s, mining employed many and agriculture was well established. There was a blacksmith at Kanmantoo from about the start of the town. The Blacksmith cottage is still standing in the town today.

On the outskirts of Kanmantoo a fertiliser supplier called Neutrog manufactures fertilisers and garden enhances. The company started in 1988 and is based at Kanmantoo. The factory site covers an area of 20 hectares and employs over 50 people.

== Mining ==
The town is named after the Kanmantoo mine about 2.5 kilometres (1.6 mi) south. In 1840, copper was found and the Kanmantoo mine was opened by the South Australia company. Cornish, German, English and Irish came in abundance to the area for the "rich" potential in mining. In 1845, Geologists reported that the quality of the surface ore looked to be even more valuable than survey taken at Burra Creek. Consequently, a land survey was taken by The South Australia Company. This immense area was 4 miles wide and 8 miles from north to south. The mine was named by William Gilles after a local Aboriginal word. The site of the old underground mine is now in a much larger open cut with new explorations of underground lodes of copper and gold. The mine is now owned by Hillgrove Resources. It is in the Adelaide Geosyncline.

== Transport ==
Kanmantoo is on the Old Princes Highway between Nairne and Callington, but most through traffic now bypasses the town on the South Eastern Freeway. An exception to this is Cyclists, as they are unable to use the freeway to travel between Adelaide and Murray Bridge. The Adelaide-Wolseley railway line also passes near the mine, but there is no station at Kanmantoo.

== See also ==
- Hundred of Kanmantoo
