= County of Sturt =

Sturt
- Cadastral division
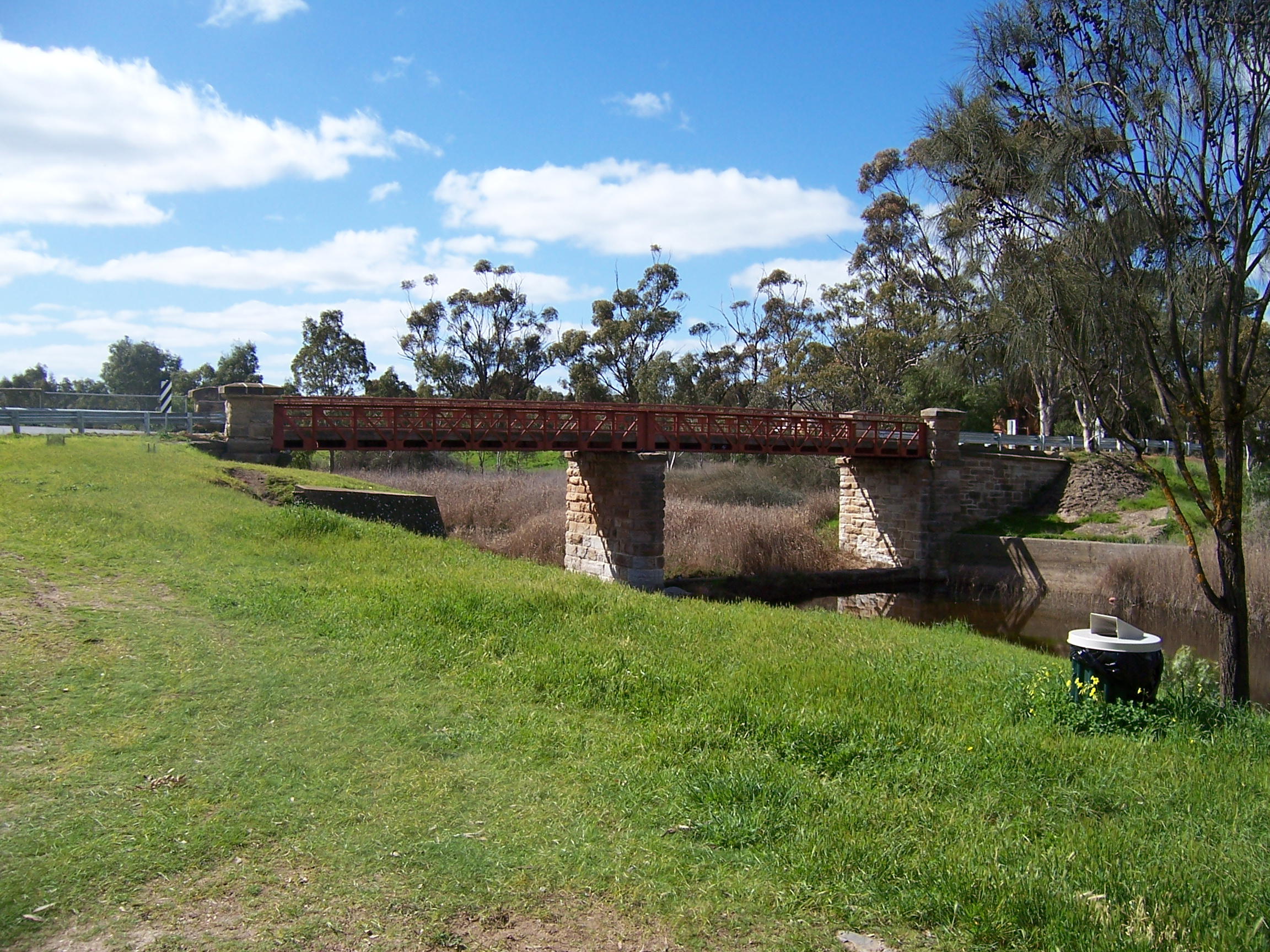
- Bridge over the Bremer River at Callington joining the hundreds of Kanmantoo and Monarto

- Coordinates: 35.00°S 139.16°E
- Country: Australia
- State: South Australia
- LGA(s): Mid Murray Council Barossa Council City of Murray Bridge Mount Barker District Council Alexandrina Council
- Established: 1842

Area
  - Total: 3,440 km^{2} (1,328 sq mi)
Lands administrative divisions around Sturt
Light	Eyre	Albert
Adelaide	Sturt	Russell
Hindmarsh	Russell	Russell
- Coordinates; Adjoining counties

The County of Sturt is one of the 49 cadastral counties of South Australia. It was proclaimed by Governor George Grey in 1842 and named for early Australian explorer, Charles Sturt. It stretches from the Bremer River and eastern slopes of the Adelaide Hills at Nairne and Tungkillo to the Murray River in the east and in the south, the portion of Lake Alexandrina north of a line from Point Sturt to Pomanda Island. This includes the west-of-river parts of the contemporary local government areas of the Mid Murray Council and Murray Bridge City.

== Hundreds ==
The County of Sturt is divided into the following hundreds:

- Hundred of Angas (Cambrai)
- Hundred of Brinkley (Brinkley, Wellington)
- Hundred of Finniss (Mannum)
- Hundred of Freeling (Tolderol)
- Hundred of Jutland (Springton, Eden Valley)
- Hundred of Kanmantoo (Nairne, Callington)
- Hundred of Mobilong (Murray Bridge)
- Hundred of Monarto (Monarto)
- Hundred of Ridley (Wongulla)
- Hundred of Tungkillo (Tungkillo)

== See also ==
- Lands administrative divisions of South Australia
