= Balyarta railway station =

Railway station in South Australia

Balyarta

General information
- Coordinates: 35.0940°S 138.9874°E
- System: Former Australian National regional rail
- Operator: South Australian Railways
- Line: Adelaide-Wolseley
- Distance: 66 kilometres from Adelaide

Construction
- Structure type: Ground

Other information
- Status: Closed

Services
Preceding station	Australian Rail Track Corporation	Following station
Petwood towards Adelaide	Adelaide–Wolseley railway line	Callington towards Serviceton
Location

Balyarta railway station was a ground-level stopping place located on the Adelaide to Wolseley line serving the South Australian locality of Balyarta.

== History ==
Balyarta station was located between Petwood and Callington on the Adelaide to Wolseley line, being marked with a shed. The line opened in stages: on 14 March 1883 from Adelaide to Aldgate, on 28 November 1883 to Nairne, on 1 May 1886 to Bordertown and on 19 January 1887 to Serviceton. It was operated by South Australian Railways and in March 1978 it was transferred to Australian National. A siding was provided, allowing trains to cross each other at this location. The station was still listed as a stopping place in the ANR public timetable in July 1976. A derailment occurred while two goods trains passed each other at Balyarta on 22 June 1977, with the siding being closed afterwards. In 1995, the line was converted to standard gauge. There is no longer any trace of the station.
