= Petwood railway station =

Railway station in South Australia

Petwood

General information
- Coordinates: 35.0764°S 138.9521°E
- System: Former Australian National regional rail
- Operator: South Australian Railways
- Line: Adelaide-Wolseley
- Distance: 63 kilometres from Adelaide

Construction
- Structure type: Ground

Other information
- Status: Closed and demolished

Services
Preceding station	Australian Rail Track Corporation	Following station
Nairne towards Adelaide	Adelaide–Wolseley railway line	Balyarta towards Serviceton
Location

Petwood railway station was a ground-level stopping place located on the Adelaide to Wolseley line serving the South Australian locality of Petwood.

== History ==
Petwood station was located between Nairne and Balyarta on the Adelaide to Wolseley line, being marked with a station sign. The line opened in stages: on 14 March 1883 from Adelaide to Aldgate, on 28 November 1883 to Nairne, on 1 May 1886 to Bordertown and on 19 January 1887 to Serviceton. It was operated by South Australian Railways and in March 1978 it was transferred to Australian National. A crossing loop was provided, allowing trains to cross each other at this location. The crossing loop was extended to 1052m in March 1980. The station was still listed as a stopping place in the ANR public timetable in July 1976, though the station sign was removed during the crossing loop extension in 1980, suggesting that it was closed by this time. In 1995, the line was converted to standard gauge. There is no longer any trace of the station, though the 1052m crossing loop was retained during conversion to SG.
