= Dawesley =

Dawesley South Australia
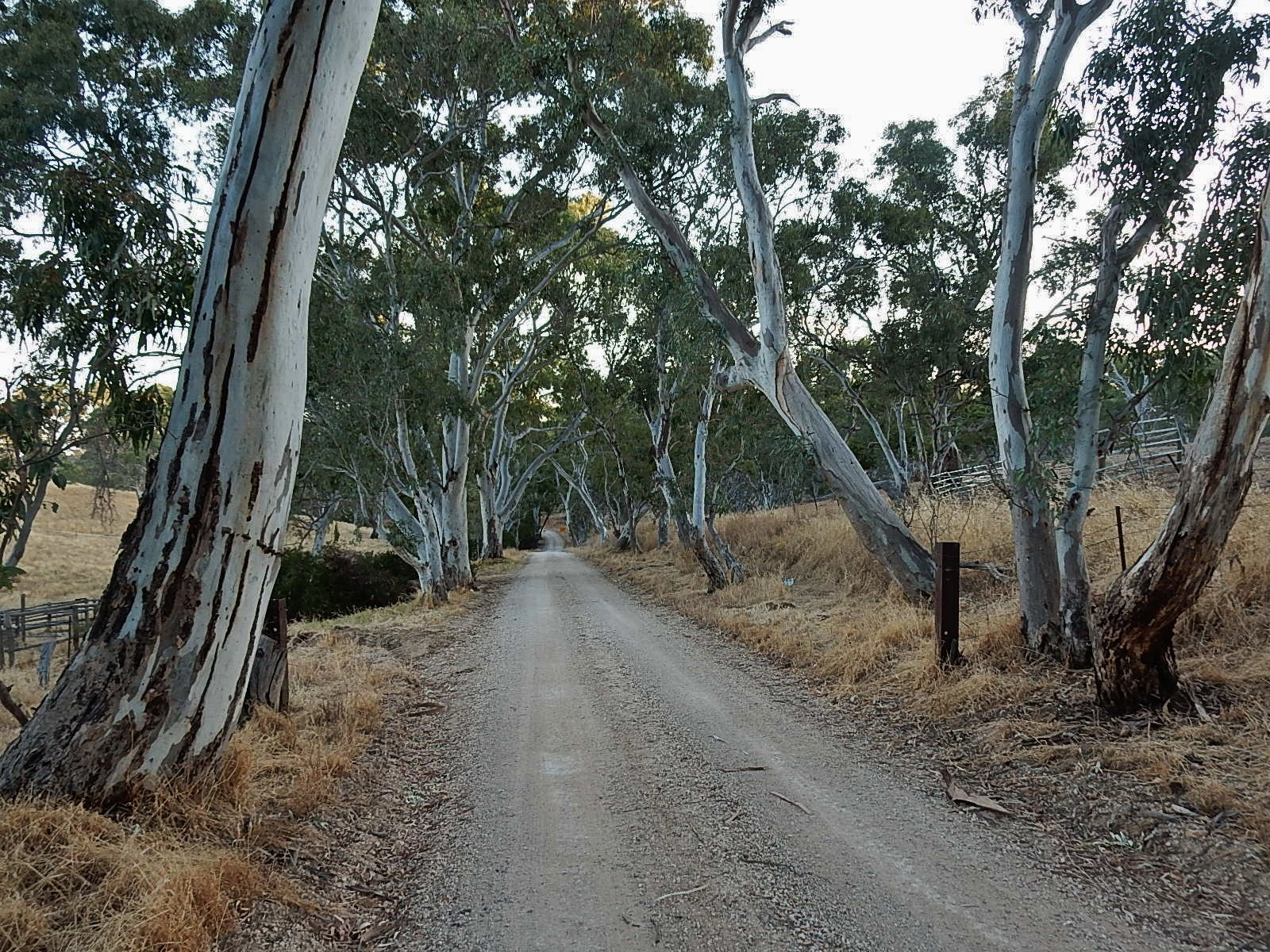

- Coordinates: 35°02′32″S 138°56′43″E
- Population: 259 (2016 census)
- Established: 1857
- Location: 40 km (25 mi) SE of Adelaide; 4 km (2 mi) east of Nairne
- LGA(s): District Council of Mount Barker
- State electorate(s): electoral district of Kavel
- Federal division(s): Division of Mayo
Localities around Dawesley:
	Brukunga
Nairne	Dawesley	Kanmantoo
	Petwood

Dawesley is a locality in South Australia. It is in the Adelaide Hills 40 km southeast of Adelaide. It is on Dawesley Creek, a tributary of the Bremer River, and the old Princes Highway between Nairne and Kanmantoo. It is in the Hundred of Kanmantoo.

The 2016 Australian census which was conducted in August 2016 reports that Dawesley had 259 people living within its boundaries.

== History ==
The town was laid out by William Bower Dawes and sold at the District Hotel, Nairne, on 4 May 1857. Mount Beevor station, once held by T. Hope Murray, is nearby.
