= Callington railway station, South Australia =

Railway station in South Australia

Callington
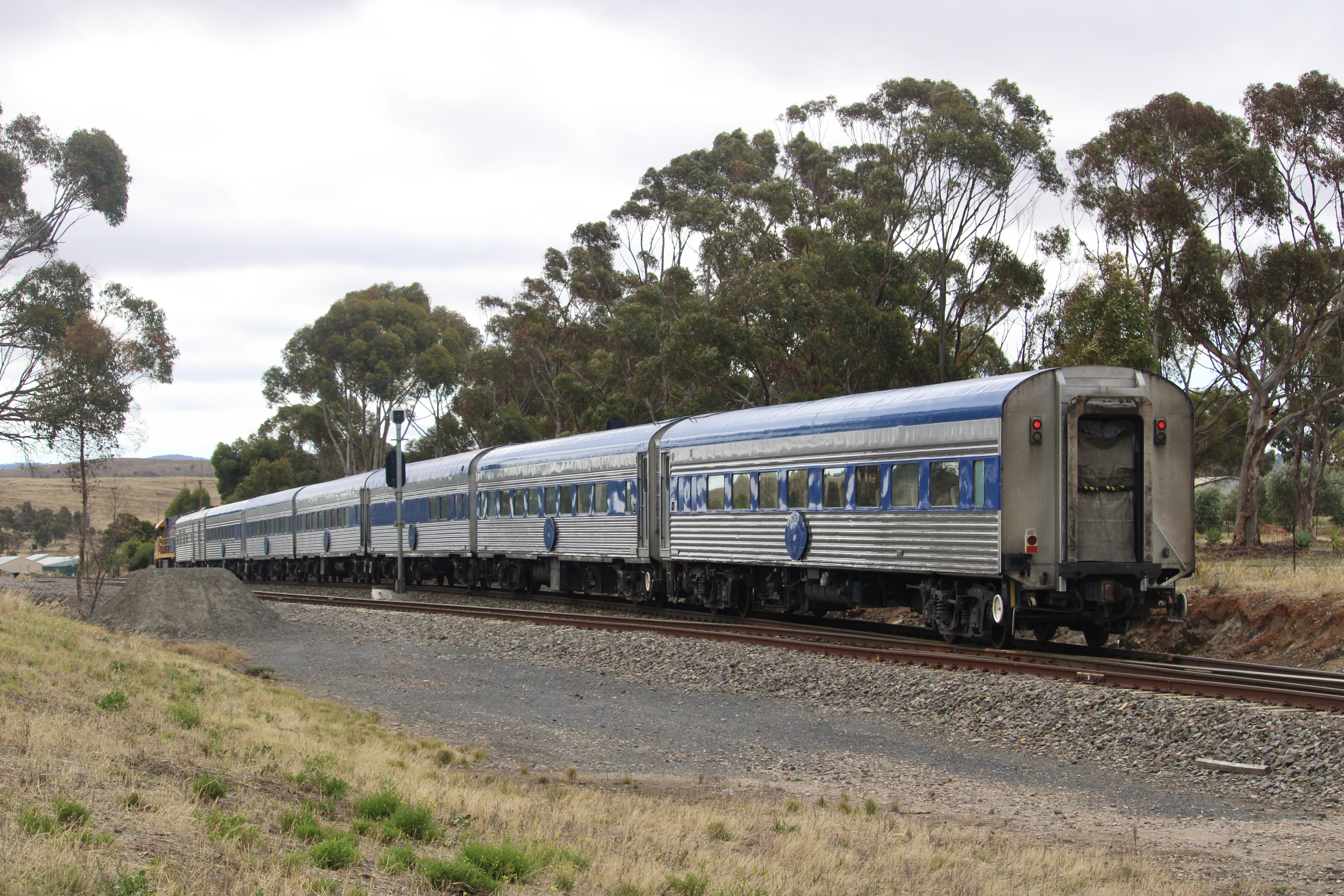
- The Overland train passing the former Callington station yard, December 2023.

General information
- Coordinates: 35.01°S 139.03°E
- System: Former Australian National regional rail
- Operator: South Australian Railways
- Line: Adelaide-Wolseley
- Distance: 72 kilometres from Adelaide
- Platforms: 2

Construction
- Structure type: Ground

Other information
- Status: Closed

History
- Opened: 1886
- Closed: 1982

Services
Preceding station	Australian Rail Track Corporation	Following station
Balyarta towards Adelaide	Adelaide–Wolseley railway line	Monarto South towards Serviceton
Location

Callington railway station was located in the Adelaide Hills town of Callington, about 72 kilometres from Adelaide station.

== History ==
Callington station was located between Balyarta and Monarto South on the Adelaide-Wolseley line. The line opened in stages: on 14 March 1883 from Adelaide to Aldgate, on 28 November 1883 to Nairne, on 1 May 1886 to Bordertown and on 19 January 1887 to Serviceton. The station consisted of a ticket office, and a large shelter, similar to the one at Balhannah. A smaller platform and shelter shed were provided. The large shelter and ticket office were later replaced with a smaller building in 1951. A CTC relay building was also built on the platform when the line started using the CTC safeworking system. It was operated by South Australian Railways, and in March 1978 it was transferred to Australian National. Upon closure of the station on 27 November 1982, it became disused. The National Railway Museum removed the station building and sign in 1991 and installed them at the museum in 1994. It now serves as the stop for the museum's 457mm gauge trains. In 1995, the Adelaide-Wolseley line was converted to standard gauge. The station platforms were demolished, and the site of the second platform now serves as a loading/unloading point for ballast trains. The gangers (workers) house(s) were converted into accommodation but are now closed. (Now private residence). The station masters house has been restored and is also now a private residence. The water tower next to the station master's house also remains at the site.
