= Hay Valley, South Australia =

Hay Valley South Australia
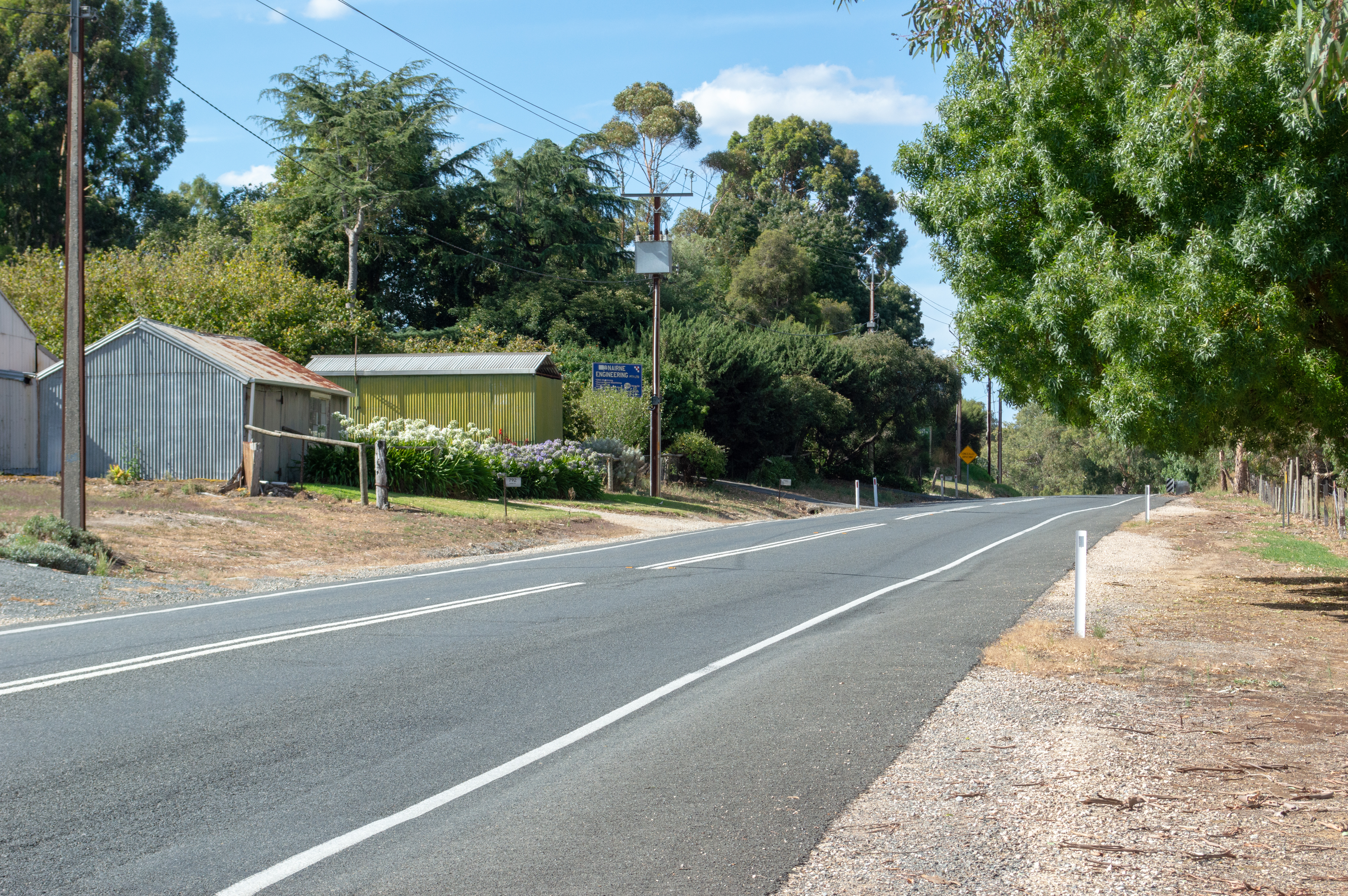

- Coordinates: 35.0078°S 138.9047°E
- Postcode(s): 5252
- Location: 11 km (7 mi) from Mount Barker; 37 km (23 mi) from Adelaide
- LGA(s): District Council of Mount Barker; Adelaide Hills Council
- State electorate(s): Kavel
- Federal division(s): Mayo
Localities around Hay Valley:
Oakbank	Woodside	Brukunga
Balhannah	Hay Valley	Brukunga
Mount Barker Junction; Littlehampton	Nairne	Nairne

Hay Valley is a small locality in South Australia, 2.7 kilometres (1.7 mi) north of Nairne. It overlies the geographical feature of the same name and was originally established as a named subsection within the Hundred of Kanmantoo. In 2016 the population was 25.
