= Acacia × semiaurea =

Scientific classification
- Kingdom: Plantae
- Clade: Tracheophytes
- Clade: Angiosperms
- Clade: Eudicots
- Clade: Rosids
- Order: Fabales
- Family: Fabaceae
- Subfamily: Caesalpinioideae
- Clade: Mimosoid clade
- Genus: Acacia
- Species: A. × semiaurea

Binomial name
- Acacia × semiaurea Maiden & Blakely

Species of legume

Acacia × semiaurea is a hybrid shrub of the genus Acacia. The hybrid formula is A. argyrophylla × A. retinoides. It is native to South Australia.

Like most species of Acacia it has phyllodes rather than true leaves. The oblanceolate shaped thinly coriaceous phyllodes have a length of 4.5 to 6 cm (1.8 to 2.4 in) and a width of 13 to 16 mm (0.51 to 0.63 in) have one nerve per face and are sparesly covered with white hairs. When it blooms it produces simple inflorescences in group of four to seven along a raceme axes of 1.5 to 3 cm (0.59 to 1.18 in) with spherical flowerheads.

== See also ==
- List of Acacia species
