= District Council of Mobilong =

District Council of Mobilong South Australia
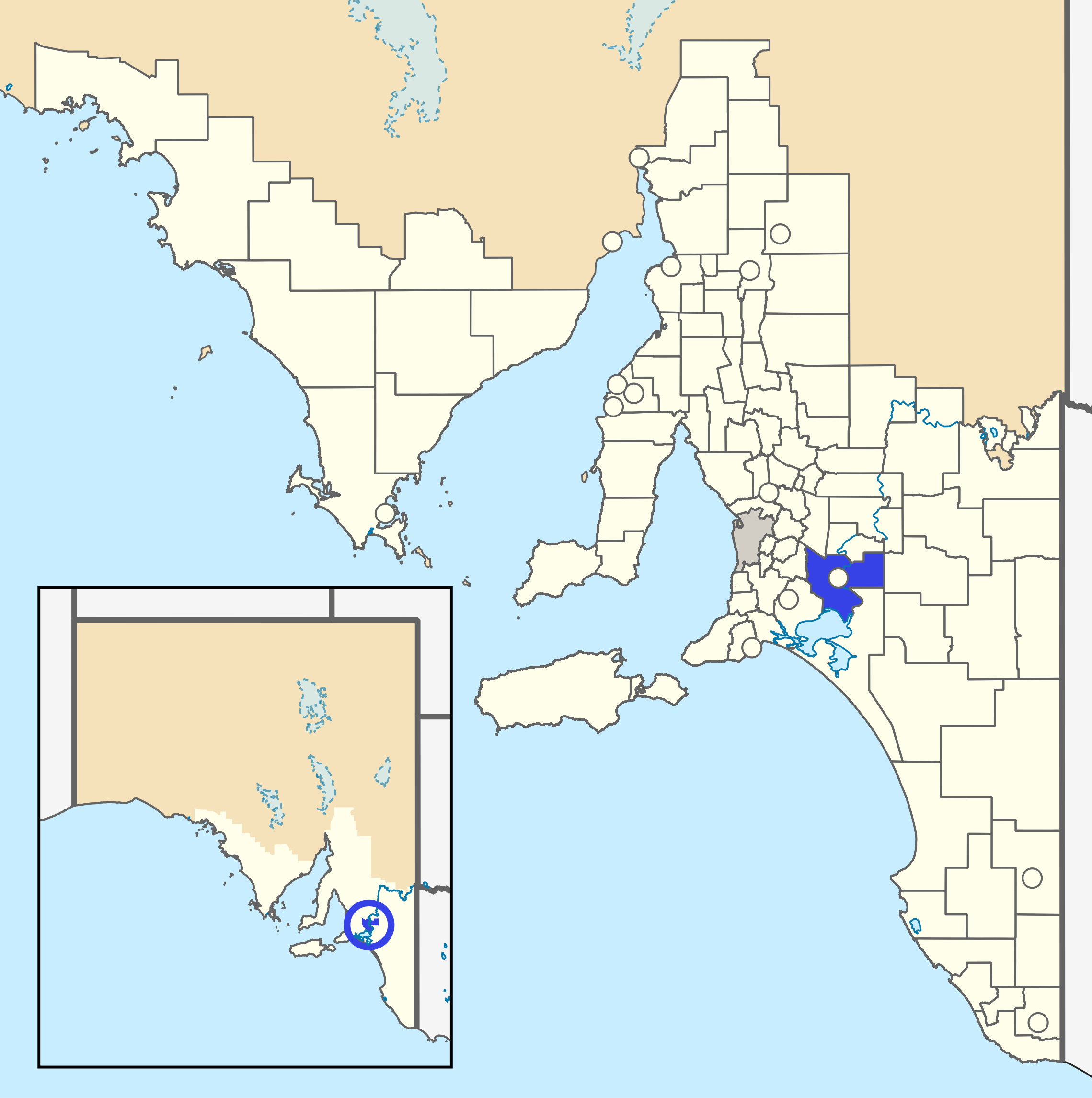
- The District Council of Mobilong (blue) as it was prior to merging with the Corporate Town of Murray Bridge (marked by a circle)
- Coordinates: 35°07′01″S 139°16′01″E
- Established: 1884
- Abolished: 1977
- Council seat: Murray Bridge

The District Council of Mobilong was a local government area in South Australia from 1884 to 1977.

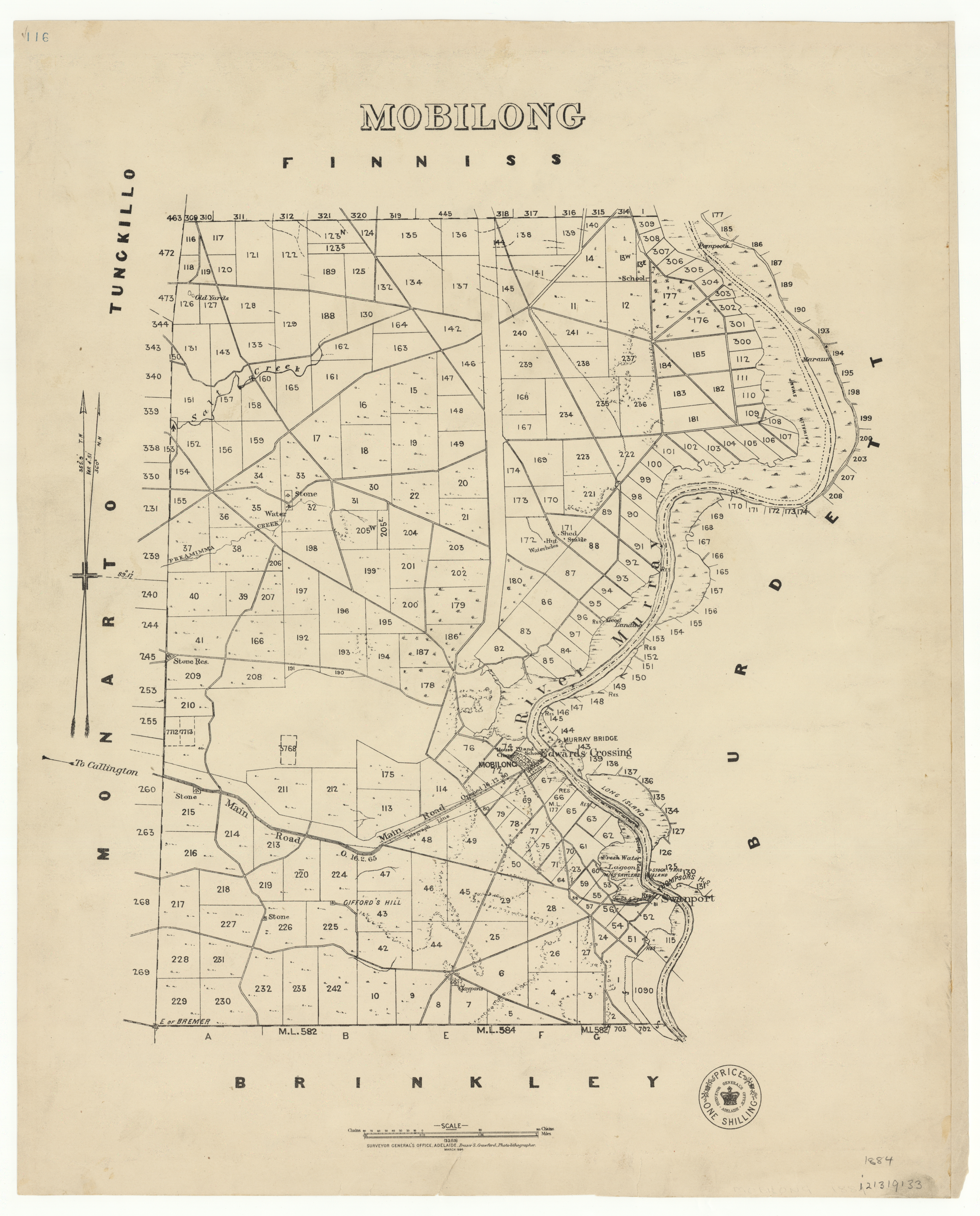
Plan of the Hundred of Mobilong in 1884 showing the river on the eastern boundary

It was proclaimed on 26 June 1884, comprising the cadastral Hundred of Mobilong. The first meeting was held on 12 July 1884 in the Murray Bridge Round House. In 1910–1911, the council built the Murray Bridge Town Hall, which contained their offices as well as a library, reading room and public hall. By 1923, it comprised an area of approximately 700 square miles, including the Hundreds of Mobilong and Ettrick and parts of the Hundreds of Burdett and Brinkley, with the growing township of Murray Bridge having its own ward. At that time, it was responsible for the supply of electricity to Murray Bridge. On 6 May 1924, it lost the town of Murray Bridge, as the Murray Bridge Ward of the council was severed to form the Corporate Town of Murray Bridge; thereafter it represented the rural districts surrounding the town.

The Mobilong council was substantially affected by a series of surrounding local council amalgamations in 1935: it absorbed the abolished District Council of Brinkley and District Council of Monarto, both of which had just been expanded by the abolition of the District Council of Onaunga, and gained a section of the District Council of Mannum, while losing a section to the new District Council of Mount Pleasant. The enlarged council comprised the whole of the Hundreds of Mobilong, Monarto, Brinkley and Ettrick, most of the Hundred of Burdett, and part of the Hundred of Freeling. Its main industries were described as dairying, citrus, sheep and wool, with the district being advantaged by the development of irrigation settlements along the Murray River.

In 1964, the Mobilong council opened new offices in Bridge Street, Murray Bridge, which it used for the remainder of its existence.

It ceased to exist on 4 April 1977, when it amalgamated with the Corporate Town of Murray Bridge to form the District Council of Murray Bridge (later called Rural City of Murray Bridge). The rapid growth of Murray Bridge had seen the town expanding into the area controlled by the district council, and the associated development issues had strengthened arguments for amalgamation.

== Chairmen of the District Council of Mobilong ==
- John Cowan (1896–1912)
- Maurice Parish (1915–1924)
- John Lancelot Cowan (1932–1949)
- Victor Cromwell (1949–1959)
- Thomas Debney Humphrey (1959–1962)
- Norman Mervyn Green (1962–1977)
