= District Council of Nairne =

District Council of Nairne South Australia
- Coordinates: 35°02′0″S 138°55′0″E
- Established: 1 September 1853
- Abolished: 21 March 1935
- Council seat: Nairne
LGAs around District Council of Nairne:
Onkaparinga (1853–1935)	Tungkillo (1855–1935)	Tungkillo (1855–1935)
Onkaparinga (1853–1935)	Nairne	Monarto (1882–1935)
Mount Barker (1853–1935)	Strathalbyn (1854–1935)	Strathalbyn (1854–1861); Onaunga (1861–1935)

The District Council of Nairne was a local government area in South Australia seated at Nairne from 1853 to 1935.

== History ==
The council was proclaimed on 1 September 1865 and included the entirety of the hundreds of Kanmantoo and Monarto. The inaugural council members were William Bower Dawes, William Giles junior, John Hillman, John Tallant Bee and Henry Appleton.

On 5 October 1882 land in the east of the council area was detached to form the District Council of Monarto.

On 21 March 1935 the council was combined with parts of Echunga and Macclesfield councils and added to the existing District Council of Mount Barker, roughly quadrupling the size of Mount Barker district.
