= Hundred of Mobilong =

Mobilong South Australia
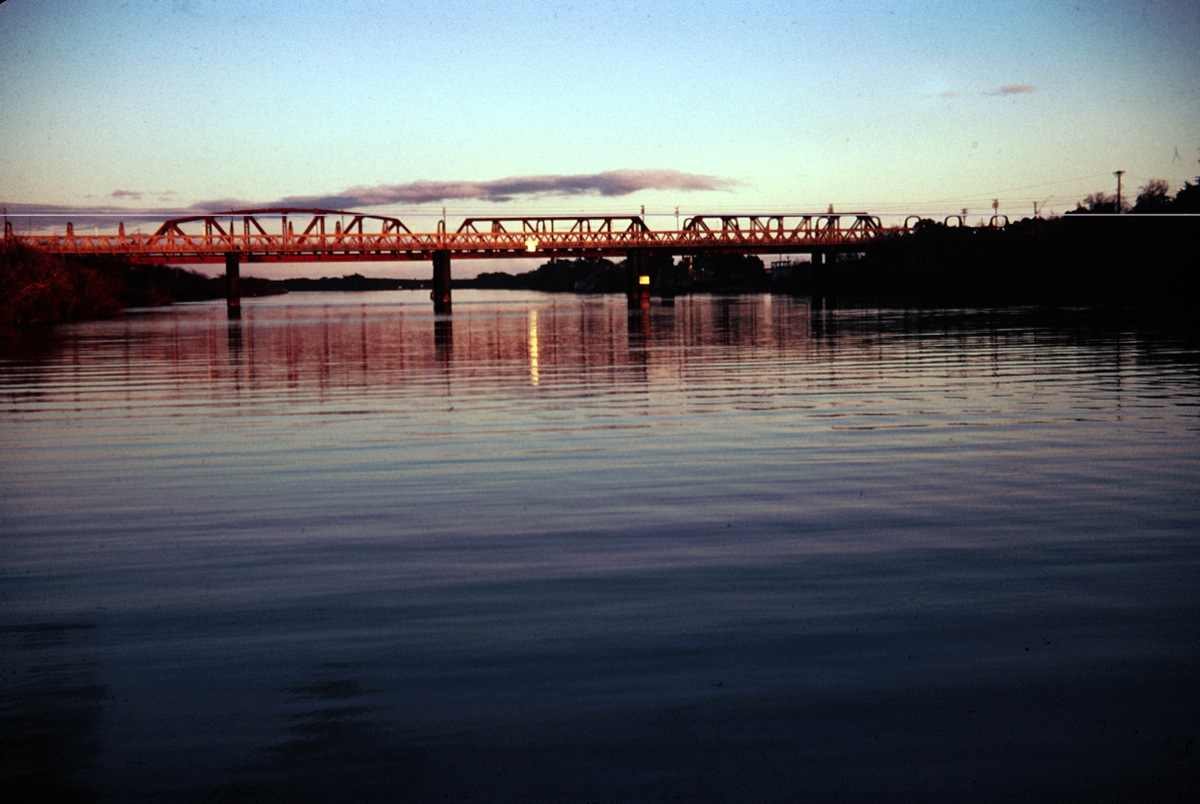
- Rail bridge over the Murray River at sunset

- Coordinates: 35.08°S 139.24°E
- Established: 19 April 1860
- Area: 307 km^{2} (118.5 sq mi)
- County: Sturt
Lands administrative divisions around Mobilong:
Tungkillo	Finniss	Younghusband
Monarto	Mobilong	Burdett
Freeling	Brinkley	Seymour

The Hundred of Mobilong is a cadastral unit of hundred on the west bank of the Murray River in South Australia and centred on Murray Bridge. One of the ten hundreds of the County of Sturt, it is bounded on the east entirely by the Murray River. It was created in 1860 by Governor Richard MacDonnell from a portion of the former Hundred of the Murray, which covered lands beside the Murray River for more than 300 kilometres (190 mi) of its course from mouth to Waikerie. It was named after an aboriginal name for the swamplands in the vicinity on the west bank of the Murray.

== Etymology ==
According to South Australian historian Geoffrey Manning, the word Mobilong is a corruption of the Aboriginal term mupulawangk, meaning "soft reed place" as "reeds along the [Murray] river bank were used in the making of coiled baskets." Mobilong was also the original name for the early township of Murray Bridge and is the present name for the suburb of Mobilong, which covers the Mobilong Swamp area immediately north of the city centre.

== Localities ==
The following localities and suburbs of the Murray Bridge Council area are situated inside (or partly inside) the bounds of the Hundred of Mobilong:

- Tepko (southern half only)
- Caloote (southern half only)
- Wall Flat (southern half only)
- Woodlane
- Pallamana
- Mypolonga
- Murray Bridge North
- Toora
- Rocky Gully
- Northern Heights
- Mobilong
- Murray Bridge
- White Hill
- Monarto South (north east portion only)
- Gifford Hill
- Murray Bridge South
- Swanport
- Riverglen

== Local government ==
The District Council of Mobilong was established in 1884, bringing local government to the hundred. From 1924 to 1977 the Corporate Town of Murray Bridge formed a second separate local government body within the hundred, and the district council expanded to govern most of land encapsulated by the easterly neighbouring hundreds of Burdett and Ettrick as well as land in the south neighbouring Hundred of Brinkley. The town and district councils merged in 1977 to bring the hundred back under the governance of an expanded single body called the District Council of Murray Bridge.

== See also ==
- Lands administrative divisions of South Australia
- Mobilong Prison
