= District Council of Gumeracha =

- Local government area
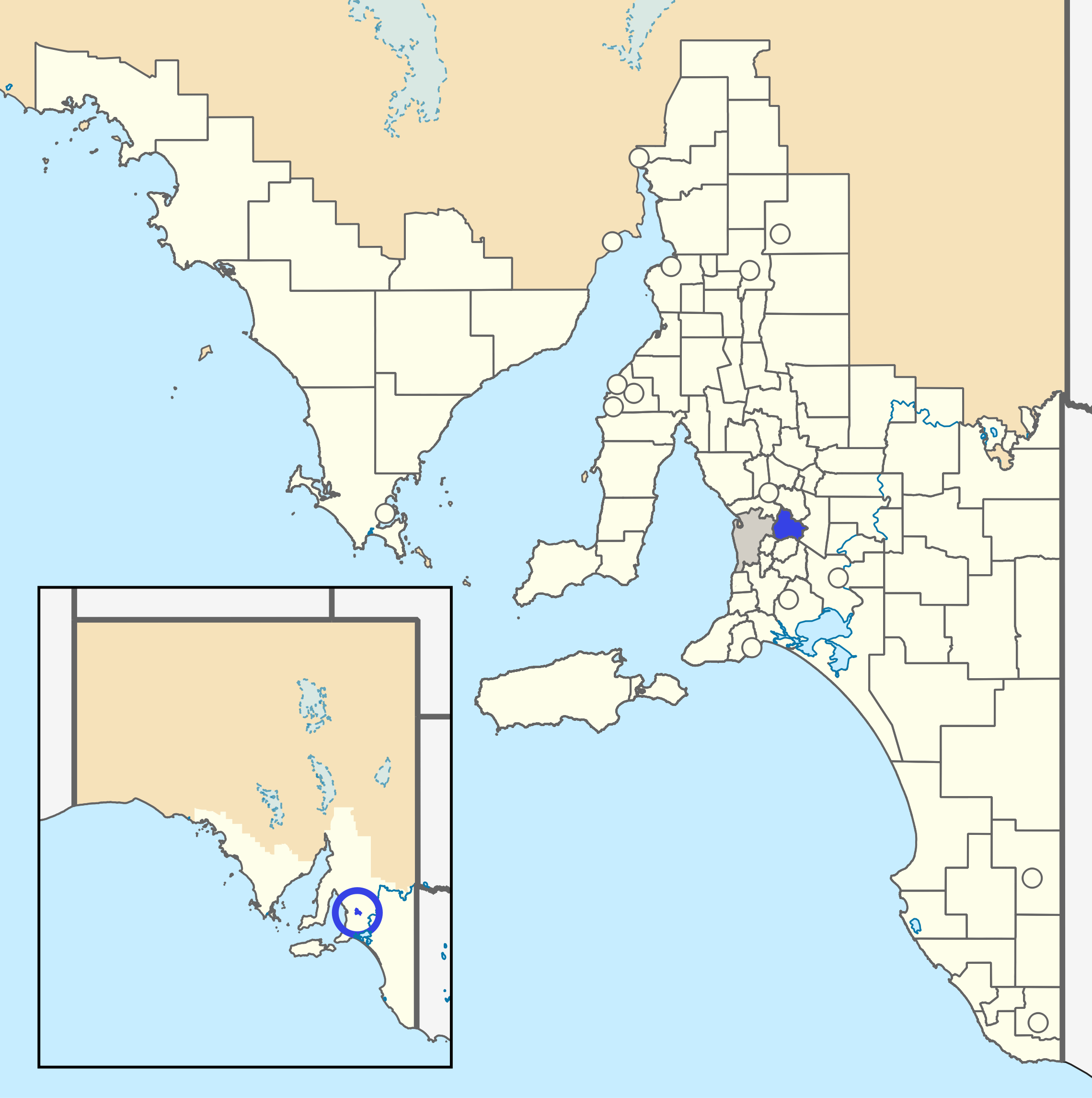
- The District Council of Gumeracha as it was prior to disestablishment (blue)
- Coordinates: 34°49′32″S 138°53′00″E
- Country: Australia
- State: South Australia
- Established: 1935
- Abolished: 1997
- Council seat: Gumeracha
LGAs around District Council of Gumeracha
Munno Para	Barossa (DC)	Mount Pleasant
Tea Tree Gully	District Council of Gumeracha	Mount Pleasant
East Torrens	Onkaparinga (DC)	Mount Barker

The District Council of Gumeracha was a local government area of South Australia from 1935 to 1997, seated at Gumeracha.

== History ==
The council was established in 1935 out of the abolished District Council of Talunga, much of the abolished District Council of Para Wirra and southwestern parts of the abolished District Council of Mount Crawford. The council area occupied approximately the southwestern two thirds of the Hundred of Para Wirra and the southwestern two thirds of the Hundred of Talunga.

In 1997 Gumeracha amalgamated with the district councils of Onkaparinga and East Torrens to its south, and the District Council of Stirling, to form the much larger Adelaide Hills Council.

== See also ==
- Hundred of Para Wirra
- Hundred of Talunga
