= Hundred of Tungkillo =

Tungkillo
- Cadastral division
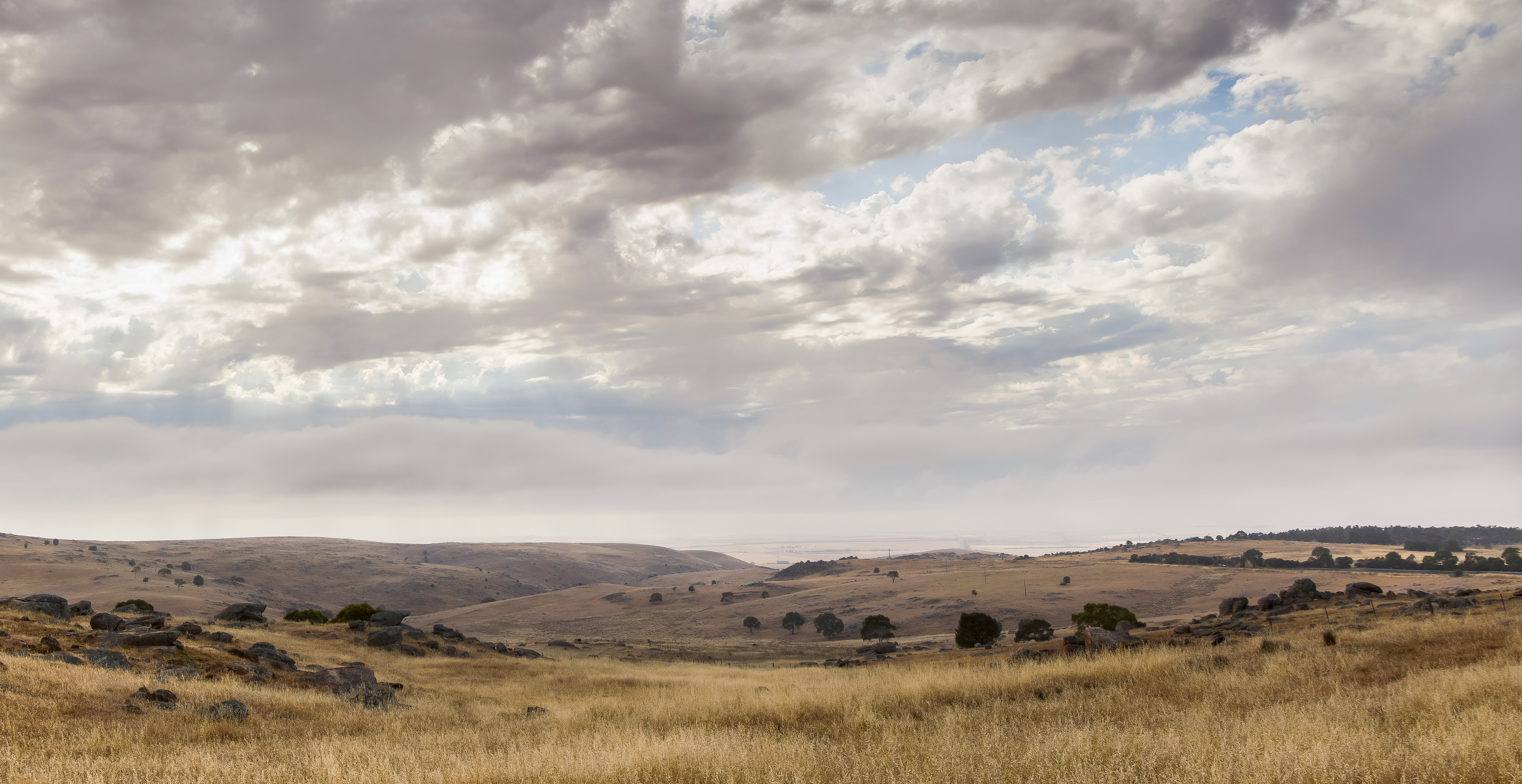
- View towards southeast from Randell Road 4 km (2.5 mi) west of Palmer

- Coordinates: 34.884°S 139.106°E
- Country: Australia
- State: South Australia
- Established: 7 August 1851

Area
  - Total: 307.6 km^{2} (118.75 sq mi)
- County: Sturt
Lands administrative divisions around Tungkillo
Talunga; Jutland	Jutland	Angas
Talunga	Tungkillo	Finniss
Onkaparinga; Kanmantoo	Monarto	Mobilong

The Hundred of Tungkillo is a cadastral unit of hundred in the southeastern foothills of the Mount Lofty Ranges. One of the 10 hundreds of the County of Sturt, it was proclaimed on 7 August 1851 by Governor Henry Young. According to local historian Geoff Manning, the place name is derived from tainkila an indigenous term used by the Peramangk people meaning "ghost moth grubs" which was first applied to Tungkillo mine, about 2.5 kilometres (1.6 mi) south of the township of Palmer in the east of the hundred.

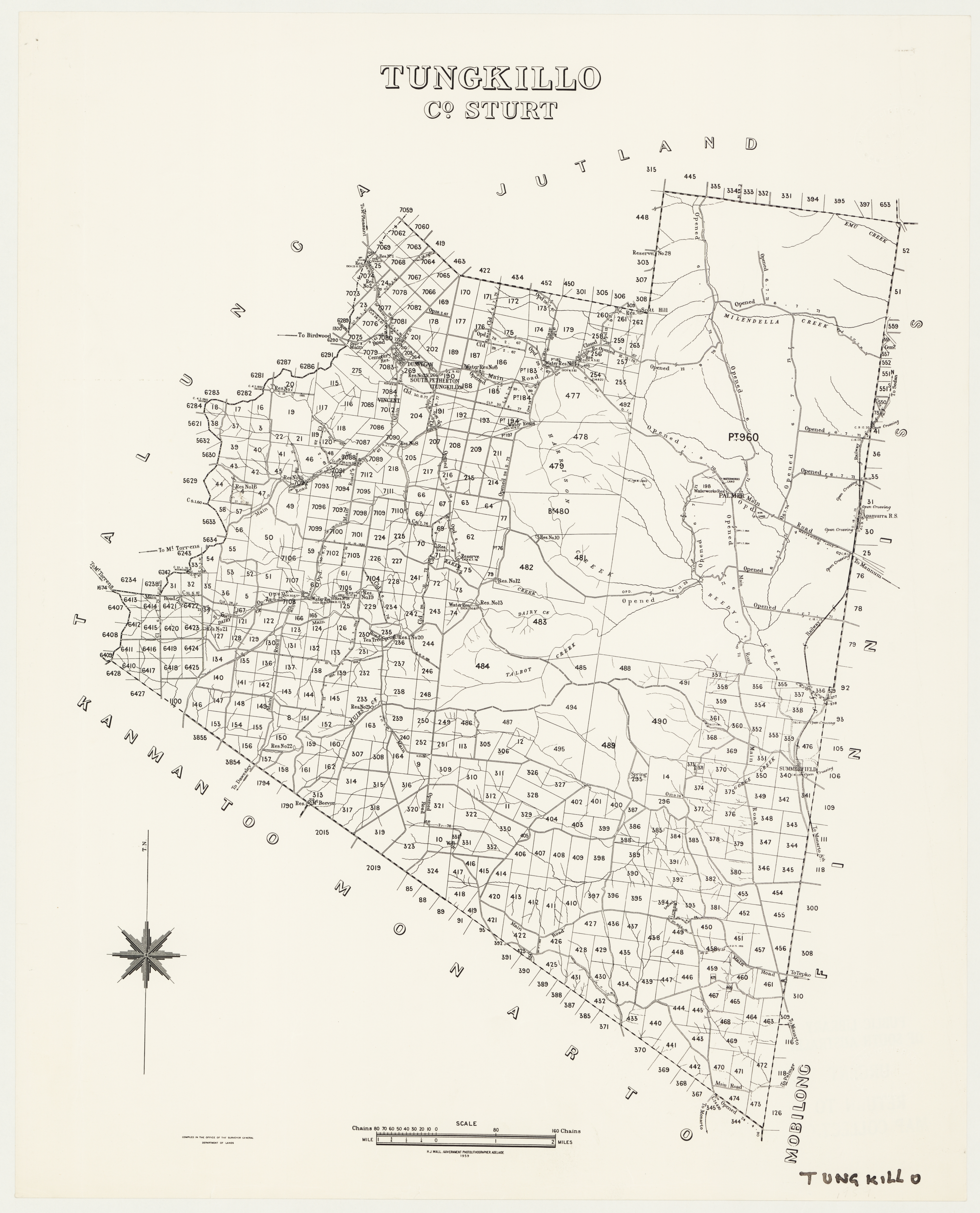
Plan of the Hundred of Tungkillo in 1959

Apart from the towns of Tungkillo in the hundred's west and Palmer in the hundred's east, minor portions of the localities of Mount Pleasant, Birdwood, Mount Torrens, Milendella, Mannum and Rockleigh cross over the western, northern and eastern borders of the hundred, respectively.

== Local government ==
The District Council of Tungkillo was established in 1855, incorporating the entirety of the hundred. In 1935 the council amalgamated with the District of Springton to become part of the new District of Mount Pleaseant. In the late 1990s the councils in the region were shuffled again and Mount Pleasant was dissolved. The Hundred of Tungkillo became the Tungkillo–Palmer ward of the new Mid Murray Council. As of 2019 the hundred forms a part of the Mid Murray council's Shearer ward.

== See also ==
- Lands administrative divisions of South Australia
