= Hundred of Talunga =

Talunga
- Cadastral division
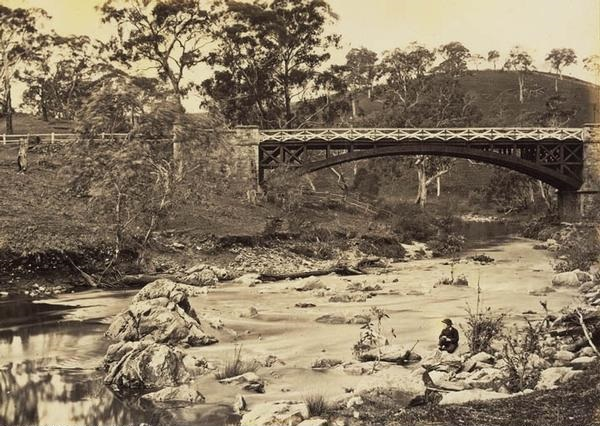
- Bridge over the Torrens at Gumeracha, circa 1869

- Coordinates: 34.821°S 138.938°E
- Country: Australia
- State: South Australia
- Region: Adelaide Hills
- Established: 29 October 1846

Area
  - Total: 230 km^{2} (89 sq mi)
- County: Adelaide
Lands administrative divisions around Talunga
Para Wirra	Para Wirra	Jutland
Yatala	Talunga	Tungkillo
Onkaparinga	Onkaparinga	Kanmantoo

The Hundred of Talunga is a cadastral hundred of the County of Adelaide, South Australia, spanning the Torrens Valley in the Adelaide Hills. It was proclaimed by Governor Frederick Robe in 1846 and named for an indigenous term thought to mean 'waterhole'.

The main towns within the hundred are Cudlee Creek, Kenton Valley, Gumeracha, Mount Torrens, Birdwood, Forreston and Mount Pleasant

== Local government ==
The earliest local government within the hundred was established with the formation of the District Council of Talunga in 1853, which covered the whole hundred. In 1884, the Mount Pleasant ward in the east of the Talunga council area seceded to join the District Council of South Rhine (later called Springton), which had been established in 1865.

In 1935, Talunga council was abolished and the area amalgamated with most of Para Wirra and Mount Crawford councils to form the District Council of Gumeracha. In the same year, the Springton and Tungkillo councils merged with parts of Mannum and Mobilong councils to form the new District Council of Mount Pleasant.

In 1997 the larger western part of the hundred came under the local governance of the much larger Adelaide Hills Council area, when that council was formed by amalgamations of Gumeracha with the neighbouring East Torrens, Onkaparinga and Stirling councils. In the same year, the old Mount Pleasant ward in the east became part of the newly-formed Barossa Council.

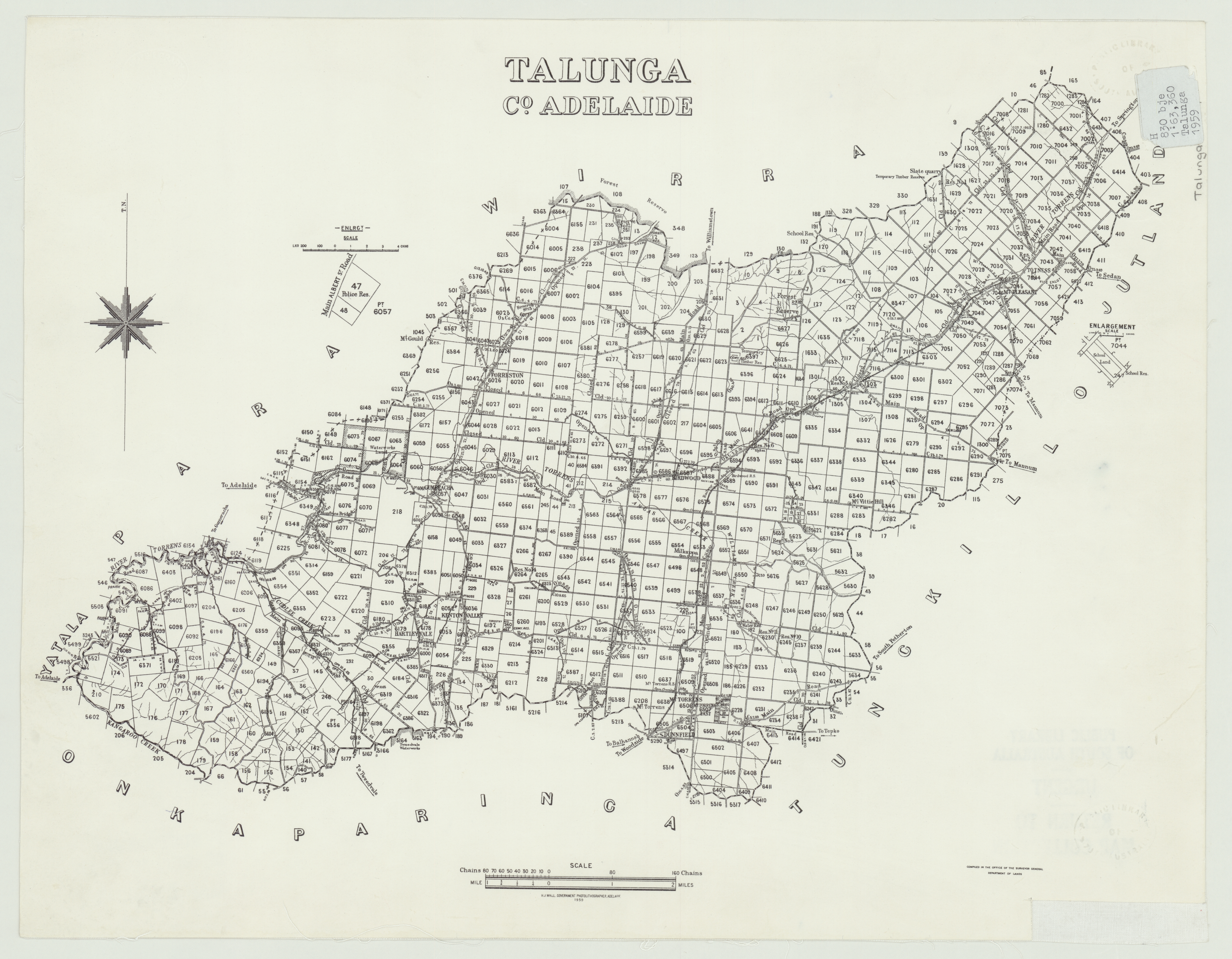
Plan of Hundred of Talunga, 1959

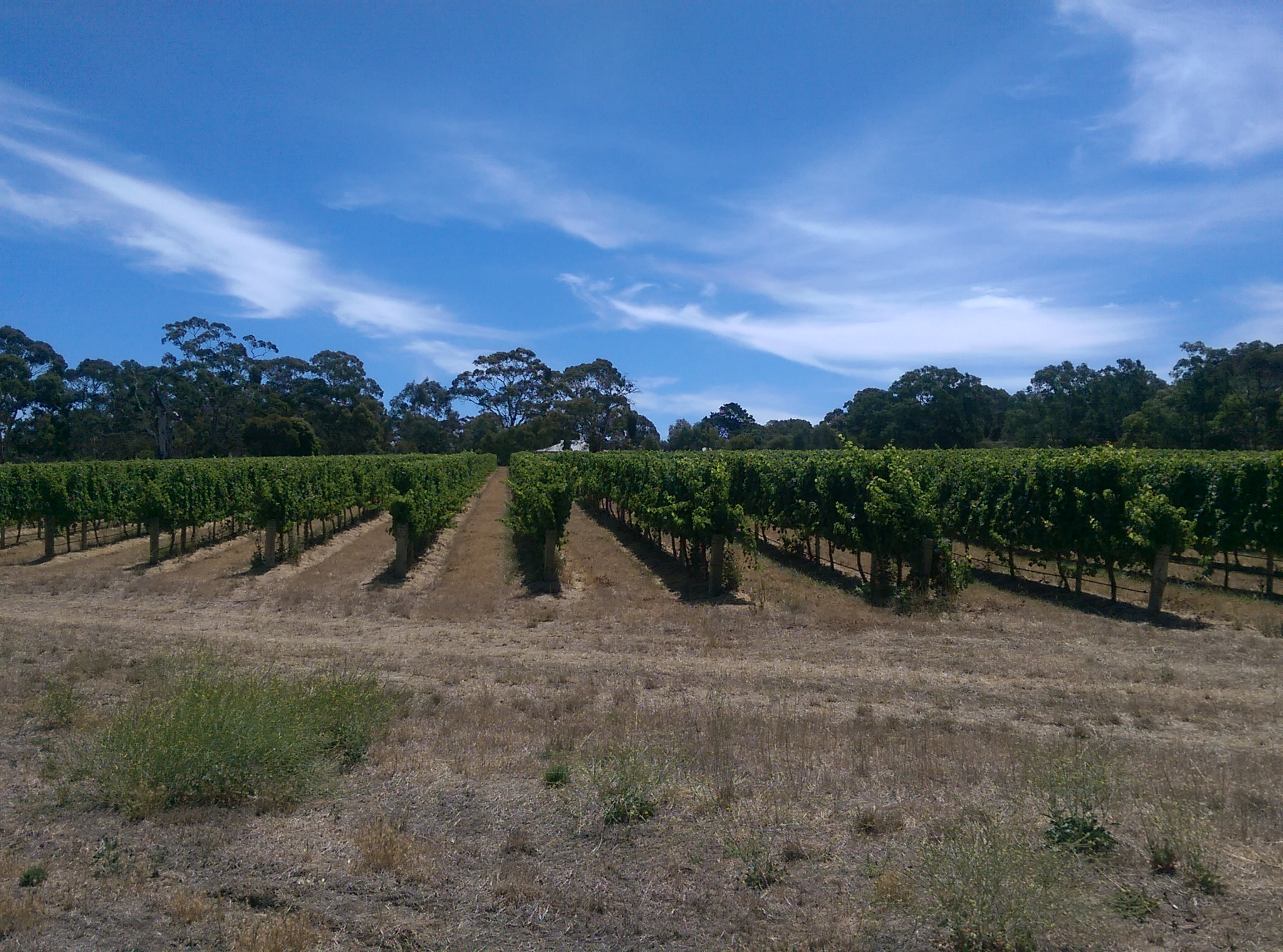
Amy Gillett Bikeway near Mount Torrens, 2016
