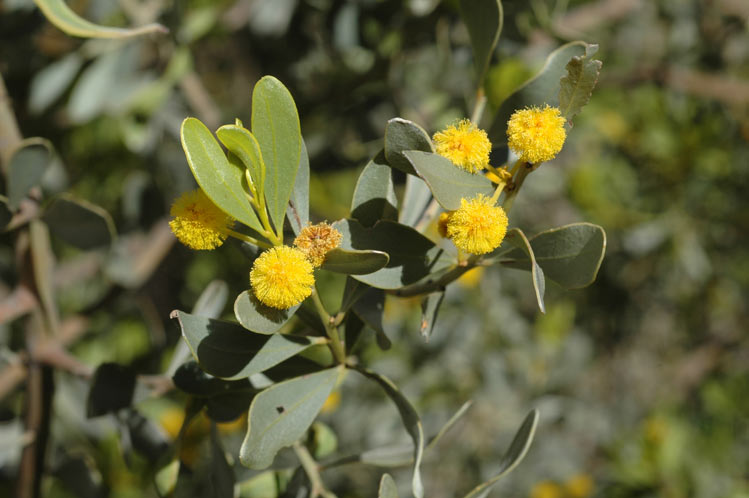
- In the ANBG

Scientific classification
- Kingdom: Plantae
- Clade: Tracheophytes
- Clade: Angiosperms
- Clade: Eudicots
- Clade: Rosids
- Order: Fabales
- Family: Fabaceae
- Subfamily: Caesalpinioideae
- Clade: Mimosoid clade
- Genus: Acacia
- Species: A. argyrophylla

Binomial name
- Acacia argyrophylla Hook.
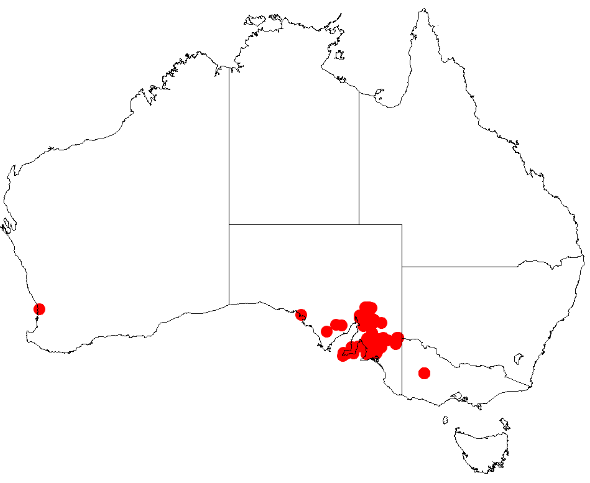
- Occurrence data from AVH

Synonyms
- Acacia bombycina Benth.; Acacia brachybotrya f. argyrophylla (Hook.) Benth.; Acacia brachybotrya var. argyrophylla (Hook.) Maiden; Racosperma argyrophyllum (Hook.) Pedley

= Acacia argyrophylla =

Silver mulga

Species of plant

Acacia argyrophylla, known colloquially as silver mulga, is a species of flowering plant in the family Fabaceae and is endemic to South Australia. It is a compact, dense, spreading shrub with lance-shaped phyllodes with the narrower end towards the base, racemes of spherical heads of golden yellow flowers, and dark brown linear pods up to 100 mm (3.9 in) long.

== Description ==
Acacia argyrophylla is an erect, compact, dense and spreading shrub that typically grows to a height 2–3 m (6 ft 7 in – 9 ft 10 in), and often the same width. The branchlets have silky, bright greenish yellow hairs. The phyllodes are lance-shaped with the narrower end towards the base, 25–50 mm (0.98–1.97 in) long and 6–15 mm (0.24–0.59 in) wide at the base of the branchlets. The phyllodes are silvery bluish grey due to the silky, silvery hairs on their surfaces. The flowers are borne in heads usually 4–10 mm (0.16–0.39 in) long on a peduncle about 10 mm (0.39 in) long, each head with 25 to 45 flowers with dense, greenish golden hairs pressed against the surface. Flowering occurs from July to November, and the fruit is a dark brown, linear pod up to 100 mm (3.9 in) long and 15 mm (0.59 in) wide containing black, elliptical to oval seeds 5–7 mm (0.20–0.28 in) long and 4.5 mm (0.18 in) wide.

== Taxonomy ==
Acacia argyrophylla was first formally described in 1848 by the botanist William Jackson Hooker in the Botanical Magazine. The specific epithet is taken from the ancient Greek words argyros (ἄργυρος) meaning silver and phyllon (φύλλον) meaning leaf, in reference to the silvery coloured foliage.

== Distribution and habitat ==
Silver mulga is found only in South Australia from around Hawker in the Flinders Ranges in the north, extending south to around Monarto. Other populations are found on the Yorke Peninsula and around Onkaparinga Gorge. It often situated on slopes and low hills as part of open woodland and mallee communities. It is listed as "extinct" in Victoria, under the Victorian Government Flora and Fauna Guarantee Act 1988.

== See also ==
- List of Acacia species
