= St Ives, South Australia =

St Ives
- Town
- Coordinates: 35.115°S 138.99°E
- Country: Australia
- State: South Australia
- LGA: District Council of Mount Barker
- Location: 48 km (30 mi) ESE of Adelaide; 13 km (8.1 mi) E of Mount Barker

Government
  - State electorate: Hammond
  - Federal division: Mayo

Population
  - Total: 30 (2016 census)
- Postcode: 5252
- Gazetted: 20 November 2003
Localities around St Ives
Petwood	Petwood	Kanmantoo
Wistow	St Ives	Callington
Wistow	Red Creek	Red Creek

St Ives is a rural locality in the Adelaide Hills of South Australia.

St Ives spans a section of the South Eastern Freeway between Mount Barker and Callington. There is an unsealed road under the freeway linking the two sides, but no access on or off of the freeway in St Ives.

== History ==
Saint Ives was once a village built around the 1840s, however it was abandoned and the land it occupied is now used for the South Eastern Freeway.

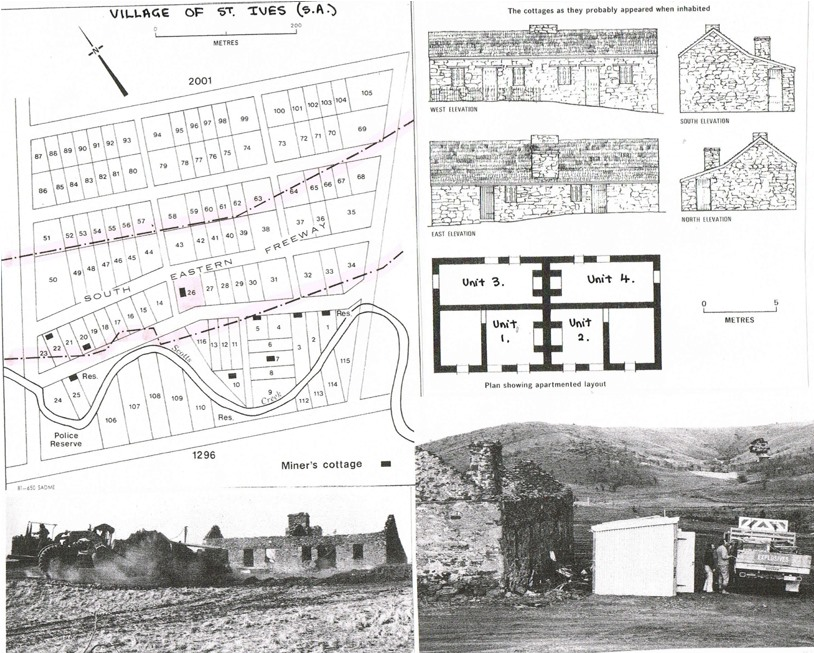
A map showing the former village of Saint Ives, in South Australia

== Demographics ==
In the 2016 Census, St Ives had 408 residents, with 50.5% female and 49.5% male. The median age was 44 years. No residents identified as Aboriginal or Torres Strait Islander. Common ancestries included English (41.2%), Australian (32.4%), Scottish (11.5%), German (8.1%), and Irish (7.8%).

Most residents (66.7%) were born in Australia, followed by England (5.9%) and New Zealand (1.5%). English was spoken at home by 91.2% of the population. Religiously, 34.8% reported "No Religion," followed by Anglican (18.6%), Catholic (12.5%), and Uniting Church (8.1%), with 11.3% not stating a religion.
