= Hundred of Jutland =

Jutland
- Cadastral division
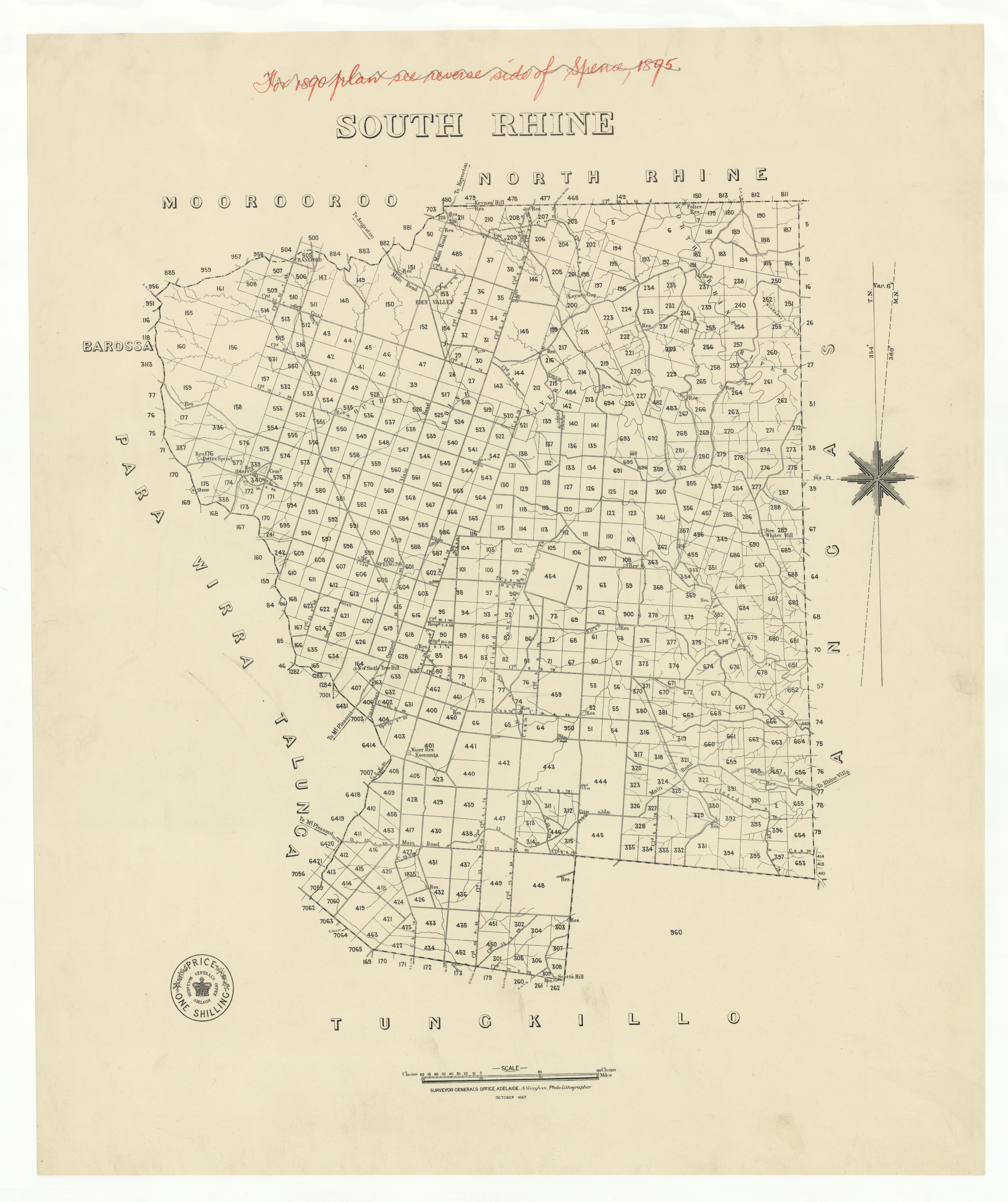

- Coordinates: 34.702°S 139.134°E
- Country: Australia
- State: South Australia
- Established: 7 August 1851

Area
  - Total: 250 km^{2} (98 sq mi)
- County: Sturt
Lands administrative divisions around Jutland
Barossa; Moorooroo	Moorooroo; Jellicoe	Jellicoe
Para Wirra	Jutland	Angas
Talunga	Tungkillo	Finniss

The Hundred of Jutland (/ˈdʒʌtlənd/, JUT-lənd) is a hundred of the County of Sturt in South Australia. It is located on the east Mount Lofty Ranges foothills. The Hundred of South Rhine (/raɪn/ RYNE) was proclaimed in 1851 but the name was changed in 1918 to the current, after the Battle of Jutland which took place off the coast of Denmark in 1916. The name change was part of a process to remove "names of enemy origin" at the time of World War I.

The Hundred of Jutland includes the township and most of the locality of Eden Valley at its north, and Taunton and Springton at the centre. It also includes portions of Mount Pleasant, Cambrai, Sanderston and Milendella on the south and east.

The original name "South Rhine" is in reference to the Marne River (formerly known as South Rhine). The North Rhine flows southwards through the hundred from its source at the north western boundary between Moculta and Keyneton (part of the western boundary between the Hundred of Moorooroo and Jellicoe) to join the Marne east of Eden Valley.

== See also ==
- Lands administrative divisions of South Australia
