= Pomanda Island =

Pomanda Island South Australia
- Pomanda Island is the small triangular island at the tip of the peninsula

- Coordinates: 35°25′03″S 139°18′24″E
- Location: 87 km (54 mi) SE of Adelaide; 12 km (7 mi) S of Wellington

Pomanda Island is an island in the Australian state of South Australia, located in within Lake Alexandrina about 87 kilometres (54 miles) southeast of the Adelaide city centre and 12 kilometres (7.5 miles) south of the town of Wellington. It has an area of 34 hectares (84 acres). It was the proposed site of a temporary weir of 2.6 kilometres (1.6 miles) length which was intended to protect River Murray water supplies, should it become necessary to let seawater into Lake Alexandrina.
