= Kanmantoo mine =

- Location within South Australia
- Location: Kanmantoo, South Australia, Australia; 35°05′31″S 139°00′19″E
- Products: Copper, Gold
- Opened: 1846
- Active: 1846-1874 (underground), 1970-1976 (opencut), 2011-2019 (opencut), 2023-current (underground)
- Company: Kantra Copper
- Website: kantra.com/project/kanmantoo-underground/

The Kanmantoo mine is a copper mine in the Australian state of South Australia located near the town of Kanmantoo about 55 kilometres (34 mi) southeast of the state capital of Adelaide.

== History ==
Copper was first discovered and mined in the 1840s. The town was established to house workers at the mine, which at that time was an underground mine. The original mine was active from 1846 to 1874. A new open-cut mine operated from 1970 to 1976. The current mine operators acquired the mining and exploration leases in stages over 2003–2008, and undertook open pit mining operations from 2011-2019. Development of the underground mine commenced in 2023 and has been in production since 2024. Processing at the mine site produces a concentrate which is transported by road to Port Adelaide via the South Eastern Freeway.

== Geology ==
The mineral deposits are in Cambrian Kanmantoo group rocks.

== Pumped hydroelectric energy storage ==
In April 2019, owners of the mine Hillgrove Resources announced that it had sold rights to build, own and operate a pumped hydroelectric energy storage facility in the open pit. The buyer was AGL Energy. If all the relevant government approvals were received, it was expected that the system could have been operational in 2024. The project was dropped by mutual agreement early in 2020.
