= Kantra Copper =

Australian copper mining company

Kantra Copper Limited
- Formerly: Hillgrove Resources Limited
- Type: Public
- Traded as: ASX: KAN
- Industry: Mining
- Headquarters: Adelaide, South Australia, Australia
- Key people: Robert Fulker (CEO and Managing Director)
- Products: Copper, Gold
- Website: kantra.com

Kantra Copper Limited, formerly Hillgrove Resources Limited, is an Australian copper mining company headquartered in Adelaide, South Australia. The company owns and operates the Kanmantoo Copper Mine in the Adelaide Hills and is listed on the Australian Securities Exchange.

The company operated Kanmantoo as an open-pit copper mine before transitioning the operation to underground mining. Underground development commenced in May 2023, first copper concentrate from the restarted operation was produced in February 2024, and commercial underground production was declared in July 2024.

In August 2026, shareholders approved changing the company's name from Hillgrove Resources Limited to Kantra Copper Limited. 'Kan' short for Kanmantoo, and 'tra' short for terra.

== History ==
Mining in the Kanmantoo district dates to the nineteenth century, with copper first discovered in the area in the 1840s. A large-scale open-pit mine was subsequently developed by Kanmantoo Mines Limited and operated from 1970 until 1976.

Hillgrove Resources became involved in the Kanmantoo area in 2003 and subsequently consolidated ownership of the project and surrounding exploration licences.

Hillgrove redeveloped Kanmantoo as an open-pit operation, with production commencing in 2011. Open-pit mining continued until 2020 and produced approximately 137,000 tonnes of copper and more than 55,000 ounces of gold.

Following further exploration beneath and adjacent to the open pit, Hillgrove announced the commencement of early works for an underground mine in March 2023. Underground mining commenced in May 2023 and the processing plant produced its first copper concentrate from the underground operation in February 2024. Commercial production was declared in July 2024.

Robert Fulker was appointed chief executive officer and managing director on 1 July 2024.

During 2025, the company's first full year of underground production, Kanmantoo produced 11,315 tonnes of copper. The company's net revenue for the year was A$167.6 million.

In August 2026, shareholders approved changing the company's name from Hillgrove Resources Limited to Kantra Copper Limited.

== Kanmantoo Copper Mine ==
The Kanmantoo Copper Mine is located approximately 55 kilometres southeast of Adelaide in the Adelaide Hills. The operation includes an underground mine and a processing plant with a capacity of approximately 3.6 million tonnes of ore per year.

Underground production initially focused on the Kavanagh mineralised zone, with development of the Nugent deposit providing an additional underground mining area.

The company has continued underground and surface exploration around Kanmantoo. In 2024, an updated mineral resource estimate reported 19.3 million tonnes at 0.77 per cent copper and 0.14 grams per tonne of gold, containing approximately 150,000 tonnes of copper and 82,000 ounces of gold.

== Mutooroo Copper Project ==
In May 2026, Hillgrove Resources entered into a binding farm-in agreement with Havilah Resources relating to the Mutooroo Copper Project in northeastern South Australia, approximately 60 kilometres southwest of Broken Hill. Under the agreement, the company has the right to earn an 80 per cent interest in Mutooroo through a staged investment and pre-feasibility study process.

The project contains copper, cobalt and gold mineralisation. The proposed development concept being assessed includes transporting material from Mutooroo for processing using the existing infrastructure at Kanmantoo.
