= Harrogate, South Australia =

Harrogate South Australia
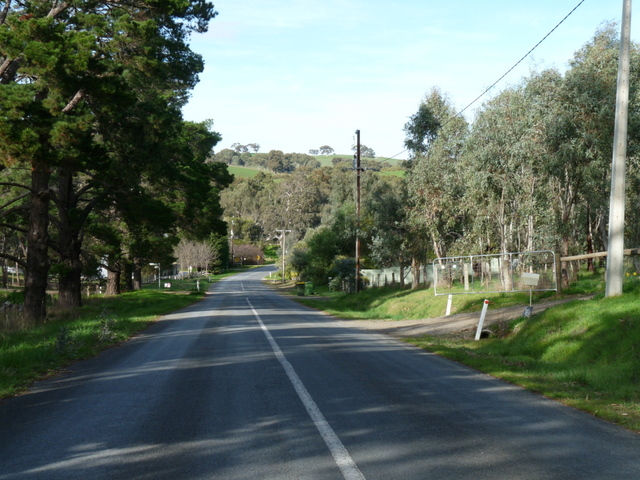
- Main street of Harrogate

- Coordinates: 34°57′0″S 139°01′0″E
- Population: 431 (SAL 2021)
- Established: 1858
- Postcode(s): 5244
- Location: 13 km (8 mi) east of Woodside; 15 km (9 mi) north-east of Dawesley
- LGA(s): District Council of Mount Barker
- Region: Adelaide Hills
- State electorate(s): Kavel
- Federal division(s): Mayo

Harrogate is a small South Australian town, located in the Adelaide Hills on the banks of the Bremer River. It was laid out by Charles Burney Young in 1858, and is believed to be named after Harrogate, North Yorkshire, in England by John Baker. The town has a number of historic buildings, dating back to the mid-19th century, including a former Bible Christian chapel (c. 1859), and a village hall (now a community hall). A post office also operated in the town between the years 1861 to 1974.

Harrogate is approximately 56 km from Adelaide.
