= Hundred of Finniss (South Australia) =

Finniss
- Cadastral division
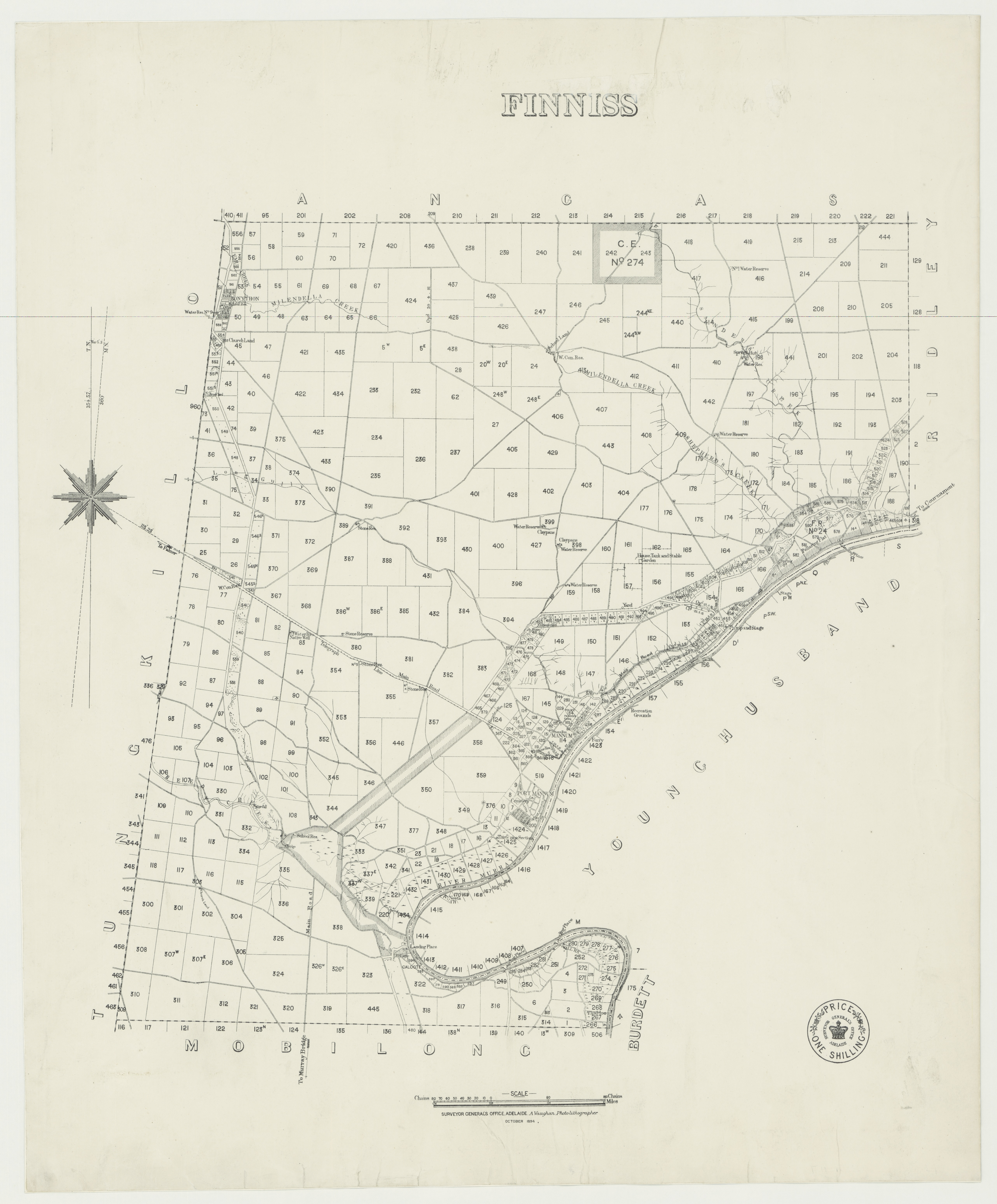
- Hundred of Finniss, 1894

- Coordinates: 34.859°S 139.295°E
- Country: Australia
- State: South Australia
- Established: 19 April 1860

Area
  - Total: 330 km^{2} (126 sq mi)
- County: Sturt
Lands administrative divisions around Finniss
Jutland	Angas	Ridley
Tungkillo	Finniss	Younghusband
Monarto	Mobilong	Burdett

The Hundred of Finniss is a cadastral unit of hundred. It is in South Australia, on the west bank of the lower Murray River. It is one of the ten hundreds of the County of Sturt. The main population centre in the hundred is the township of Mannum, a river port. Apart from Mannum and Port Mannum, other localities within the hundred are Punthari in the north, Frayville and Apamurra in the west, the riverside hamlets of Pellaring Flat and Zadows Landing in the east, and parts of Wall Flat, Milendella, Tepko, and Caloote.
