= Monarto, South Australia =

Monarto
- Town
- Coordinates: 35°04′54″S 139°07′48″E
- Country: Australia
- State: South Australia
- Region: Murray and Mallee
- LGA: Rural City of Murray Bridge
- Location: 63 km (39 mi) from Adelaide
- Established: 1908; 16 March 2003 (locality)

Government
  - State electorate: Kavel
  - Federal division: Barker

Population
  - Total: 203 (SAL 2021)
- Time zone: UTC+9:30 (ACST)
  - Summer (DST): UTC+10:30 (ACDT)
- Postcode: 5254
- County: Sturt
Localities around Monarto
Rockleigh	Rockleigh	Pallamana
Callington	Monarto	Pallamana; Rocky Gully
Callington	Monarto South	Monarto South

Monarto is a locality in South Australia 16 km (9.9 mi) west of the Murray River. It is north of the South Eastern Freeway between the Callington and Murray Bridge exits 63 km from Adelaide.

The most common employment in Monarto is raising cows, sheep and hay. Crops in the area include wheat, oats and barley.

In the 1970s Monarto was proposed to be the site of a new satellite city of Adelaide originally known as "New Murray Town". By the turn of the century the proposal had been completely abandoned.

== History ==
=== Establishment ===
The locality of Monarto was originally a private subdivision of section 210 of the Hundred of Monarto, from which it took its name, the hundred having been gazetted in 1847.

The Hundred was named after an aboriginal woman, "Queen Monarto", who lived in the area at the time of its proclamation. The township was laid out in 1908. Described as an elderly but agile full-blood Aboriginal woman, she was renowned for her skill in navigating the river, catching crayfish with remarkable agility, and reportedly saving three people from drowning. Queen Monarto was a respected community member, though her life was marked by hardship. Widowed and without surviving descendants, she died of blood poisoning after stepping on a rusty nail, refusing hospital treatment and dying in a traditional shelter opposite Mannum.

Boundaries for the locality of Monarto were created on 16 March 2000.

=== Proposed city of Monarto ===
==== A project to develop a new city ====
In 1970, the Labor-led South Australian government, headed by Don Dunstan, was concerned that Adelaide would become overpopulated following rapid population growth caused by high rates of both birth and immigration in the two decades prior. In total, population growth was in excess of 3% per annum and the government estimated Adelaide would reach 1.5 million by the end of the century. Further, the authorities believed that the growing population would, sooner or later, become a threat to the social and environmental quality of urban life, which at the time was relatively high. An expansion of the city would also threaten the attractive wine-producing areas to the south and north of the city.

To tackle the problems associated with Adelaide's rapidly increasing population, the state government proposed that another city should be built about 80 kilometres (50 mi) east of Adelaide. The government held the view that it would work as a kind of supporting city, to which Adelaide residents could move. The government originally used the name "Murray New Town" for the proposed city, but subsequently adopted the name "Monarto" or, more formally, the "City of Monarto").

The government estimated that 1.3 million was the optimal population for Adelaide, which meant that Monarto would have to accommodate about 200,000 people by the end of the century. Monarto would work as a satellite city to Adelaide and, since it was far enough away, it was important that Monarto should have its own identity and economy. That made it difficult to define what kind of city Monarto was supposed to be.

==== Structure of the project ====
The main purpose of the "new cities programme" was to facilitate decentralised policy in regional and urban planning and, by that, alleviate some of the problems of rapidly growing cities. In the beginning there was some opposition about including the Monarto project in the programme. Nevertheless, there was also a strong consensus that in order to succeed with establishing a city, it would be crucial to have a strong public sector employment base in the early phases of development. According to the Monarto development commission, Monarto was going to develop into a small city after years of working as a large country town. This attitude would come to affect planning over the area, as the commission wanted to find a balance between the natural features of the site, its built-form and infrastructure.

Small-scale scenarios, such as the city centre would have public spaces as a key feature, with adjacent buildings as complement. On a broad citywide scale, key landscape features would form the basis of park lands articulating built-up areas.

Dunstan, on the other hand, had his own vision of the project. According to him Monarto was going to become "a new vision of Australian city" and was going to showcase best practice in social planning and family convenience. The town would not contain any dilapidated housing estates or standard housing. Instead it would contain palatial town-houses and other houses that were made for civil servants. The inner centre would provide only leisurely cycle paths since the town should be small but beautiful, a "virgin city". To secure the economy, three industrial areas with focusing on light industry were to be established. The goal was to spread South Australia's industrial base around the state.

==== Collapse of the project ====
Dunstan's vision did not succeed. After years of planning and conflicts about compensation of farmland that had been compulsorily acquired, the project reached a turning point when new studies showed that the population growth was excessive. In 1975 the federal Whitlam government was controversially dismissed which resulted in the "new cities programme" being shut down. This was a hard about-face and, after some years, in 1980 the Monarto project faced the same outcome.

There are several reasons why the development of Monarto did not take place, despite the fact that it was an ambitious project. The main factor that stopped the project was the evidence of a much smaller population growth than was projected. Because of that, the government lost its main argument for building a new town. This resulted in less support from an already doubtful federal government which became unwilling to give any further aid to Dunstan's project.

Another factor was the economic failure, a combination of lack of success in attracting private enterprises and the economic recession that occurred during the 1970s, which made it very difficult to transfer any job from Adelaide.

A third aspect which played a more unofficial part in the downfall of the Monarto project was the constant resistance and suspicion from various interest groups. Many never really believed in the project and this may have affected the project in terms of support and financial aid. For instance, many thought the geographical location was vulnerable from an economic perspective since it was too close to Adelaide to develop an independent economy. On the political level, as already mentioned, many were doubting the wisdom of the project which made it harder to get everyone to work at it in the same direction. Also, the entry of a new federal government was a direct contribution to the shutdown of the project, due to their loss of will in contributing any more money.

The project of Monarto was ambitious, but the shortfall in urban planning and the different obstacles meant it remained an unrealised proposal and the plan never came to fruition. A large portion of the land targeted by the project has now been taken up by the Monarto Safari Park, established in 1983 as Monarto Zoo.

== Industry ==
Since the late 1900s, an industrial estate has also been established at Monarto as part of the growth of the city of Murray Bridge.

Big W had a distribution center located at Monarto until 2019, when its closure was announced. The site is currently occupied by the Monarto Innovation Precinct.

Other large companies with warehousing in Monarto include Scott's Transport, Holden and Inghams.

At the 2011 Census, residents of Monarto are mostly employed in sheep, beef cattle and grain farming (6.8%), school education (4.7%), road freight transport (3.4%), public order and safety services (3.0%) and hospitals (3.0%).

At the 2016 Census, residents of Monarto are split between landscape construction services (11.4%), meat processing (9.1%), hospitals (9.1%) and dairy cattle farming (6.8%) with another 6.8% employed in oil and gas extraction.

At the 2021 Census, residents of Monarto are split evenly between road freight transport (6.6%), legal services (6.6%), and hospitals (6.6%). The rest include other grain growing (5.5%) and secondary education (5.5%).

A 24-hour freight-only airport at Monarto was proposed by the Liberal party while in opposition in 2017 as part of a broader policy to create a freight bypass of Adelaide from Murray Bridge to the Barossa Valley via Truro. The party was elected to government in March 2018 and the planning for the new airport and associated freight network was put to tender early July 2018. Immediately afterwards a leaked report called into question the viability of the airport.

== Leisure and sport facilities ==
- The 1,500-hectare (3,700-acre) Monarto Safari Park, the world's largest open range zoo.
- Monarto Shooting Club
- Murray Bridge Motocross Club, with a track that permits both two-wheel motorcycles and quad bikes.

== Transport ==
Monarto is adjacent to the main Adelaide to Wolseley line, with Monarto South station formerly a junction for the Sedan branch line running north on the plain between the Murray River and the Mount Lofty Ranges.

== See also ==
- Monarto South, South Australia
- List of cities and towns in South Australia
