= Corporate Town of Murray Bridge =

Local government area in South Australia

The Corporate Town of Murray Bridge was a local government area in South Australia from 1924 to 1977.

It was established in February 1924, when the town of Murray Bridge was severed from the District Council of Mobilong, of which it had been the council seat and largest town, and incorporated as its own municipality. It was divided into four wards at its inception (North, South, East and West), each electing two councillors. Maurice Parish, who had been chairman of the Mobilong council, was appointed as the inaugural mayor of Murray Bridge. The two councils subsequently agreed that the town council would inherit the existing Murray Bridge Town Hall in exchange for providing for the construction of new offices for the Mobilong council in Bridge Street.

The council's early years saw the acquisition of roadmaking equipment, the construction of enclosed swimming baths, dressing and shelter sheds on the river foreshore, and the ongoing management of the Sturt Reserve and Long Island camping grounds. It played a role in the supply of electricity to the town for many years, initially distributing supply privately generated by the Murray Bridge Electricity Supply Company, taking over the power plant itself in late 1944, before selling the facility to the South Australian Electricity Trust in 1948. A free public library lending service was initiated in 1967, and an underground system of stormwater drainage implemented in 1969.

It ceased to exist on 4 April 1977, when it amalgamated with the District Council of Mobilong to form the District Council of Murray Bridge (since renamed the Rural City of Murray Bridge). The rapid growth of Murray Bridge had seen the town expanding into the area controlled by the district council, and the associated development issues had strengthened arguments for amalgamation.

== Mayors of Murray Bridge ==
- Maurice Parish (1924–1927)
- John Homburg (1927–1930)
- Maurice Parish (1930–1933)
- Keir Cairns Elliot McLean (1933–1934)
- B. W. Leach (1934–1935)
- Keir Cairns Elliot McLean (1935–1940)
- Herbert Howard Hefford (1940–1943)
- Clarence Charles Cooke (1943–1951)
- Hector White (1951–1956)
- Erich Wilhelm Doecke (1956–1963)
- Sydney James Cawte (1963–1969)
- Erich Wilhelm Doecke (1969–1975)
- Raymond John Helps (1975–1977)
