= Kanmantoo group =

Folded Kanmantoo group on Kangaroo Island

The Kanmantoo group is a label for the kind of rocks found predominantly along the eastern side of the southern Mount Lofty Ranges, including Fleurieu Peninsula and Kangaroo Island. Examples of where they are visible at the surface include several capes and headlands such as Rosetta Head near Victor Harbor, and Cape du Couedic on Kangaroo Island.

Kanmantoo group rocks are typically derived from Cambrian Period sedimentation in shallow ocean, sometimes followed by metamorphism. They are highly prospective for minerals including copper, gold, silver, zinc and lead.
