= Nairne, South Australia =

Nairne
- Town
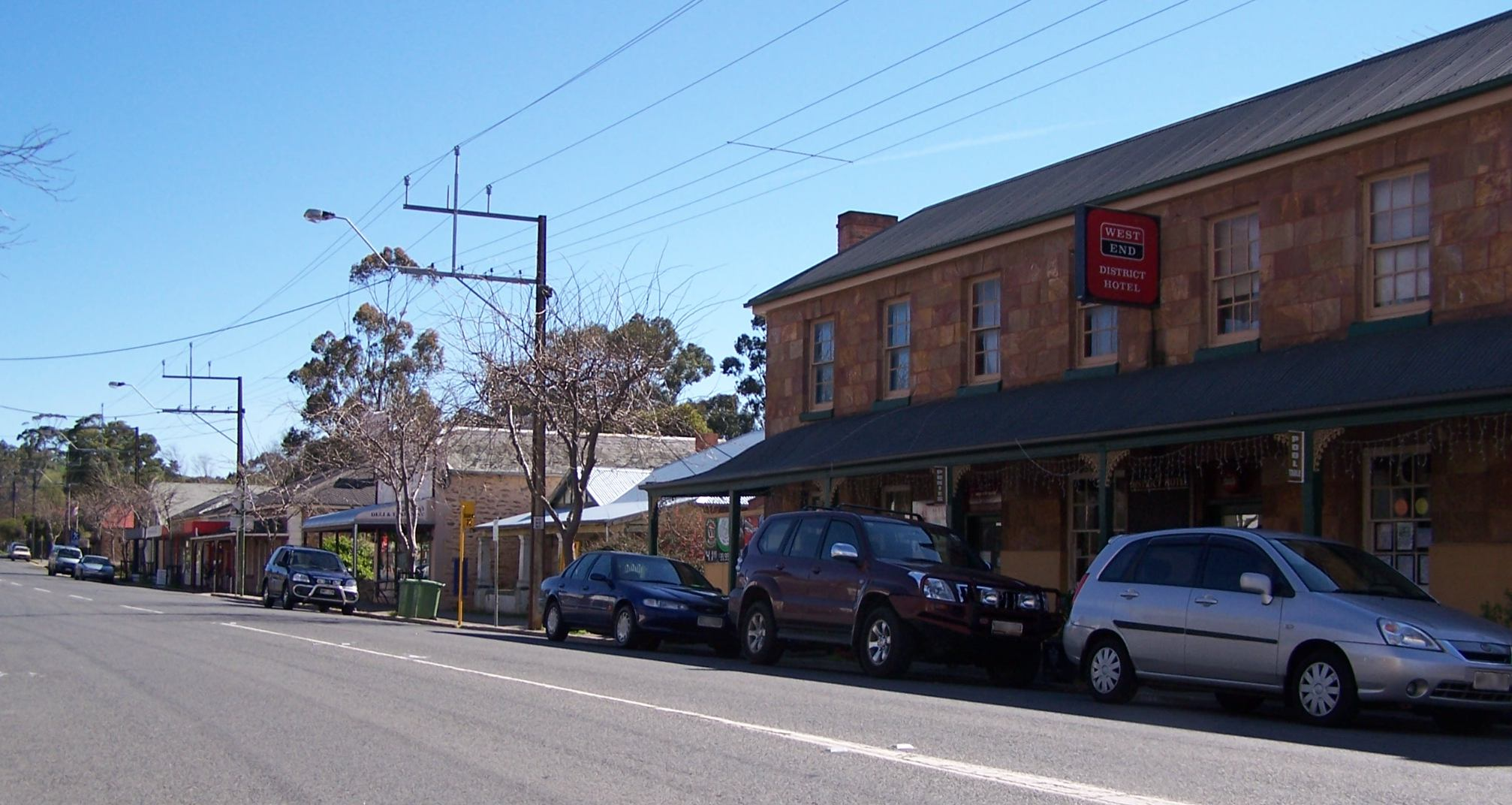
- Main Street, Nairne

- Coordinates: 35°02′0″S 138°55′0″E
- Country: Australia
- State: South Australia
- LGA: District Council of Mount Barker
- Location: 9 km (5.6 mi) from Mount Barker; 40 km (25 mi) from Adelaide
- Established: 1839

Government
  - State electorate: Kavel
  - Federal division: Mayo

Population
  - Total: 5,082 (UCL 2021)
- Postcode: 5252
Localities around Nairne
	Hay Valley	Brukunga
Littlehampton	Nairne	Dawesley
Mount Barker	Mount Barker	Mount Barker

Nairne is a small township in the Adelaide Hills of South Australia. Nairne is about 7 kilometres (4 mi) from Mount Barker, South Australia, in the federal Division of Mayo and in the state electoral district of Kavel. At the 2021 census, Nairne had a population of 5,082.

== History ==
Nairne was founded by Matthew Smillie in 1839 and named for his wife's family.

In 1854 the District Council of Nairne was established to govern local affairs of the town and its surrounds extending past Callington to the east.

Chapman's Bacon Factory was founded in Nairne in 1899 by the Chapman family and was closed in 2002 and has since been developed into a successful and thriving complex including a supermarket, post office and several variety shops.

In the late 1920s, the route of the Princes Highway, part of the main road route between Adelaide and Melbourne was changed to pass through Nairne, with road improvements from Mount Barker through Nairne to Kanmantoo. In turn, the route through Nairne became the Old Prince's Highway in the 1970s with the construction of the South Eastern Freeway.

In 2003, the main street was transformed for a section of the movie The Honourable Wally Norman, which was filmed using various areas of the Adelaide Hills, including Mount Barker, Nairne and Lobethal.

== Demographics ==
Nairne has several shops on the main street, a school, and a church. It is about 7 kilometres (4 mi) from the town of Mount Barker and about 5 kilometres (3 mi) from Littlehampton. Nairne is home to Howard's Vineyard and Lot 100 which houses a gin distillery, brewery, winery and fruit juice manufacturing. Green Valley Strawberries is a popular local farm with a cafe and farm gate sales of seasonal fruit during summer.
