= Bremer River (South Australia) =

River in South Australia

Bremer
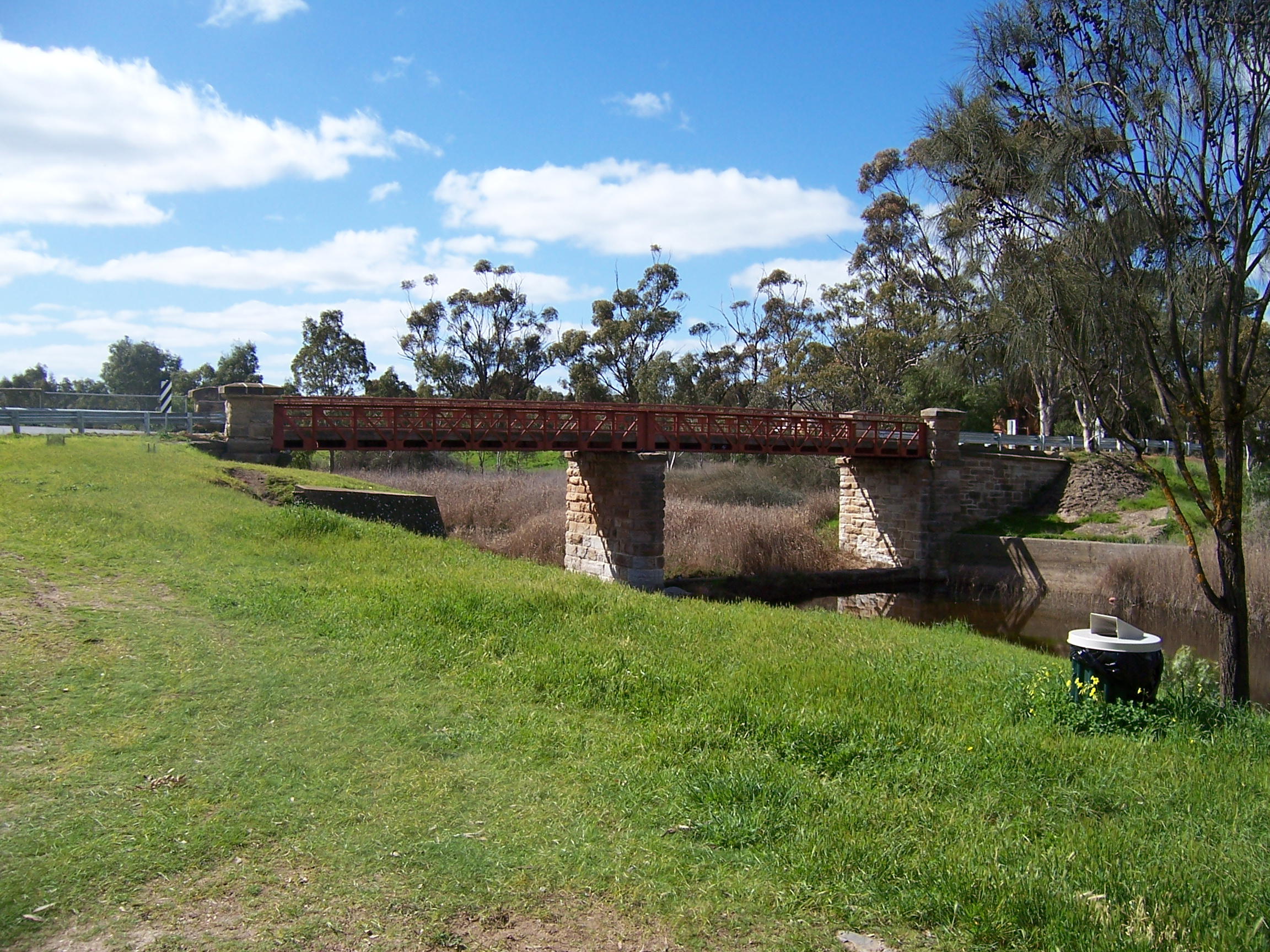
- Single lane Callington Bridge over River Bremer

- Location of the river mouth in South Australia
- Etymology: Gordon Bremer, RN
- Native name: Miochi (undetermined)

Location
- Country: Australia
- State: South Australia
- Region: Adelaide Hills
- Towns: Harrogate, Callington, and Langhorne Creek

Physical characteristics
- Source: Mount Lofty Ranges
  - location: south of Mount Torrens
  - coordinates: 34°57′05″S 138°58′11″E
  - elevation: 431 m (1,414 ft)
- Mouth: Lake Alexandrina
  - location: Murray Mouth
  - coordinates: 35°23′24″S 139°03′05″E
  - elevation: 1 m (3 ft 3 in)
- Length: 88 km (55 mi)

Basin features
- River system: Murray-Darling Basin

The Bremer River, part of the lower Murray-Darling catchment, is a river in the Adelaide Hills region in the Australian state of South Australia.

== Course and features ==
The Bremer River rises on the eastern side of the Mount Lofty Ranges at an altitude of 431 metres (1,414 ft) AHD south of Mount Torrens and flows generally south, joined by the Mount Barker Creek and Dawesley Creek, before emptying into Lake Alexandrina at the lower end of the Murray-Darling basin. The river descends 430 metres (1,410 ft) over its 88-kilometre (55 mi) course.

The largest town in the catchment area is Mount Barker. Other towns include Nairne and Kanmantoo. Towns on the Bremer River itself include Harrogate, Callington and Langhorne Creek, where the floodwaters are used to irrigate the local vineyards.

The river is crossed by the Old Princes Highway near Callington.

== Etymology ==
One recorded Aboriginal name for the Bremer River was Miochi. On 31 December 1837 the first European visitor, Robert Cock, named it the Hindmarsh River, in deference to the first Governor, John Hindmarsh. This led to the following proclamation by the second Governor, George Gawler, appearing in the South Australian Gazette, effective 26 June 1839, ‘His Excellency the Governor having observed that to the southward [of Adelaide] there are two rivers named ‘The Hindmarsh’ – one flowing into Encounter Bay, and the other into Lake Alexandrina – is pleased to direct that the latter river shall in future be named the ‘River Bremer’, in the public maps, in order to avoid confusion in the geographical description of the province.’ The man so honoured by the renaming was the distinguished British Royal Navy officer Gordon Bremer, who happened to command HMS Alligator, which conveyed Hindmarsh back to England.

== See also ==
- List of rivers of Australia § South Australia
