= Brukunga =

Town in the Adelaide Hills, South Australia

Brukunga South Australia
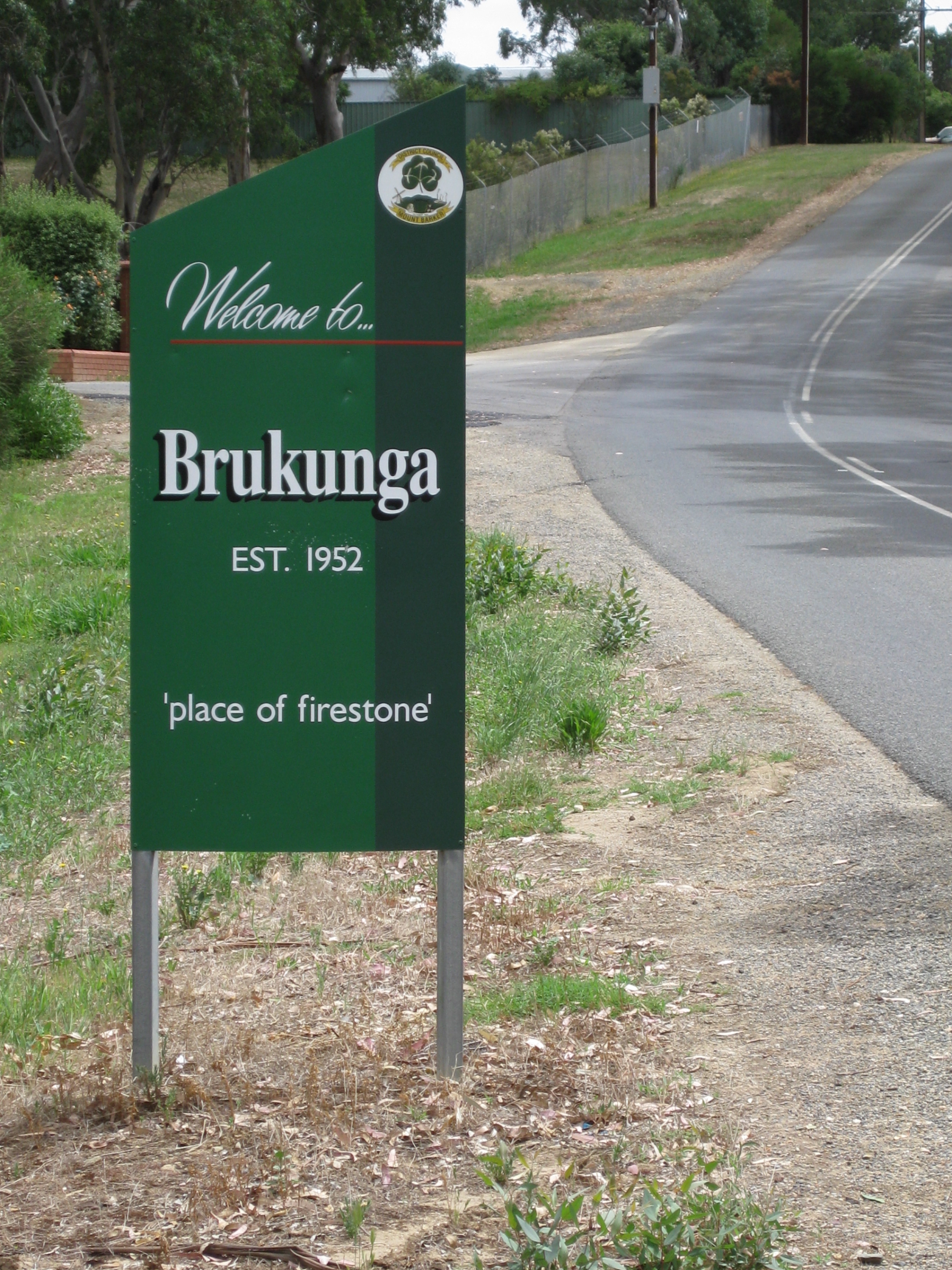
- Western entrance to Brukunga

- Coordinates: 35°00′0″S 138°57′0″E
- Population: 400 (SAL 2021)
- Established: 1952
- Postcode(s): 5252
- Location: 40 km (25 mi) east of Adelaide; 4 km (2 mi) north of Nairne
- LGA(s): District Council of Mount Barker
- State electorate(s): Kavel
- Federal division(s): Mayo

Brukunga is a small town in the Adelaide Hills, located approximately 40 kilometres (25 mi) east of Adelaide and 4 kilometres (2.5 mi) north of the town of Nairne.

== History ==
Its name, derived from Barrukungga in the local Peramangk or Kaurna language, means "place of fire stone" or the "place of hidden fire", and is associated with the creator ancestor of the Kaurna people, Tjilbruke. Tjilbruke's body was said to have been transformed into the outcrop of iron pyrite at Barrukungga. However the etymology is complex and uncertain. While Brukunga is on Peramangk traditional land, the word Barrukungga has both Kaurna and Ngarrindjeri language elements. Norman Tindale noted that "The natives were well aware of the use of iron pyrites along with flint for the striking of fire and the area near Nairne was one of the places from which they obtained supplies of iron pyrites".

Between 1955 and 31 May 1972, iron sulphides (mainly as pyrite) was mined at the Nairne Pyrite Mine—later renamed as the Brukunga Mine—immediately west of the town, and transported to Port Adelaide for the production of sulphuric acid, used for manufacturing superphosphate fertiliser. Oxidation of pyrite in waste dumps and the exposed quarry face led to formation of acid mine drainage containing high levels of cadmium and other heavy metals into the adjacent creek, triggering health warnings by the Environment Protection Agency in 1998. Since 1980, rehabilitation of the mine site has occurred, including a lime neutralisation plant to treat acid water before it enters the Dawesley Creek, but concerns over water quality remain. Revegetation of the site has also progressively occurred since 1988.

== Description ==
At the 2016 Australian census, Brukunga had a population of 433.

The town is the location of the Country Fire Service training centre and the Claremont Airbase which has been the main operating base for aerial firefighting since 2016.
