= Callington, South Australia =

Callington
- Town
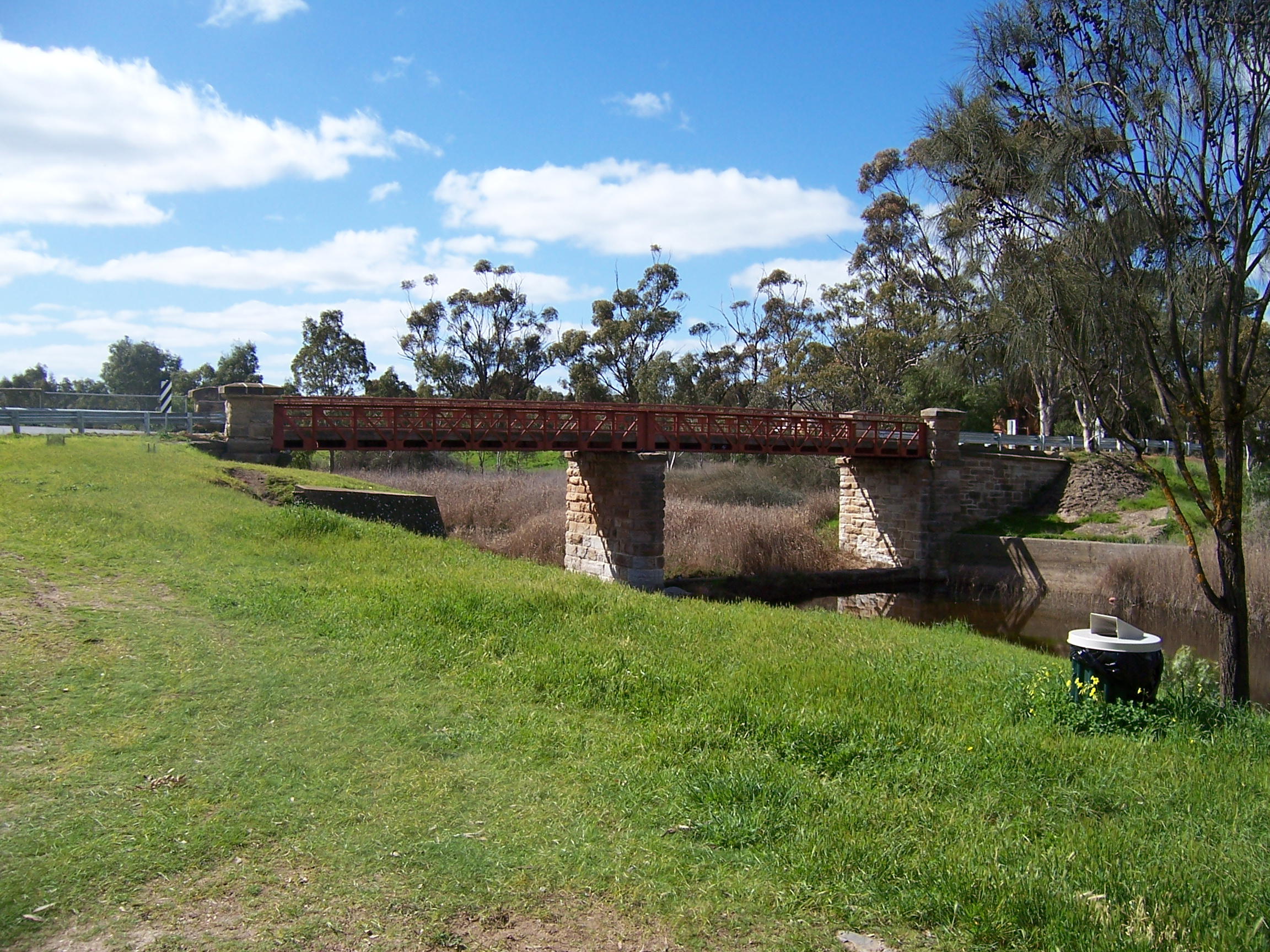
- Single lane Callington Bridge over River Bremer

- Coordinates: 35°07′05″S 139°02′09″E
- Country: Australia
- State: South Australia
- Region: Adelaide Hills; Murray and Mallee
- LGAs: District Council of Mount Barker; Rural City of Murray Bridge
- Location: 60 km (37 mi) east of Adelaide
- Established: 1847

Government
  - State electorate: Kavel
  - Federal division: Mayo
- Elevation: 101 m (331 ft)

Population
  - Total: 478 (UCL 2021)
- Postcode: 5254
- County: Sturt
Localities around Callington
| Kanmantoo | Rockleigh | Monarto |
| St Ives | Callington | Monarto South |
| Red Creek | Salem | Hartley |

Callington is a small town on the eastern slopes of the Adelaide Hills, in South Australia. Callington is situated on the Bremer River, and is adjacent to the South Eastern Freeway and the Adelaide-Wolseley railway line, however no trains have stopped at the station for many years. Callington is located within the state electoral district of Kavel and the federal division of Mayo.

== History ==
Callington was surveyed in 1848, at which time John Kiernan noticed copper in the rocks. Callington was named after the copper mining town Callington in Cornwall, UK. The Callington Inn opened in 1851. Little copper was mined at first, before the miners followed the Victorian gold rush. Mining restarted a few years later in the Bremer Mine, digging the lode down until the water table was reached. In 1857 a forty-inch steam engine was installed to pump out 500,000 litres (110,000 imp gal; 130,000 US gal) of water per day. An even bigger pump was brought from Hallett Cove in 1859. In 1860–61, 150 workers were mining 250-300 tons of ore a month, which was smelted at Callington. Despite some good years, the Bremer Mine eventually fell into liquidation in 1870 due to low copper prices.

== Demographics ==
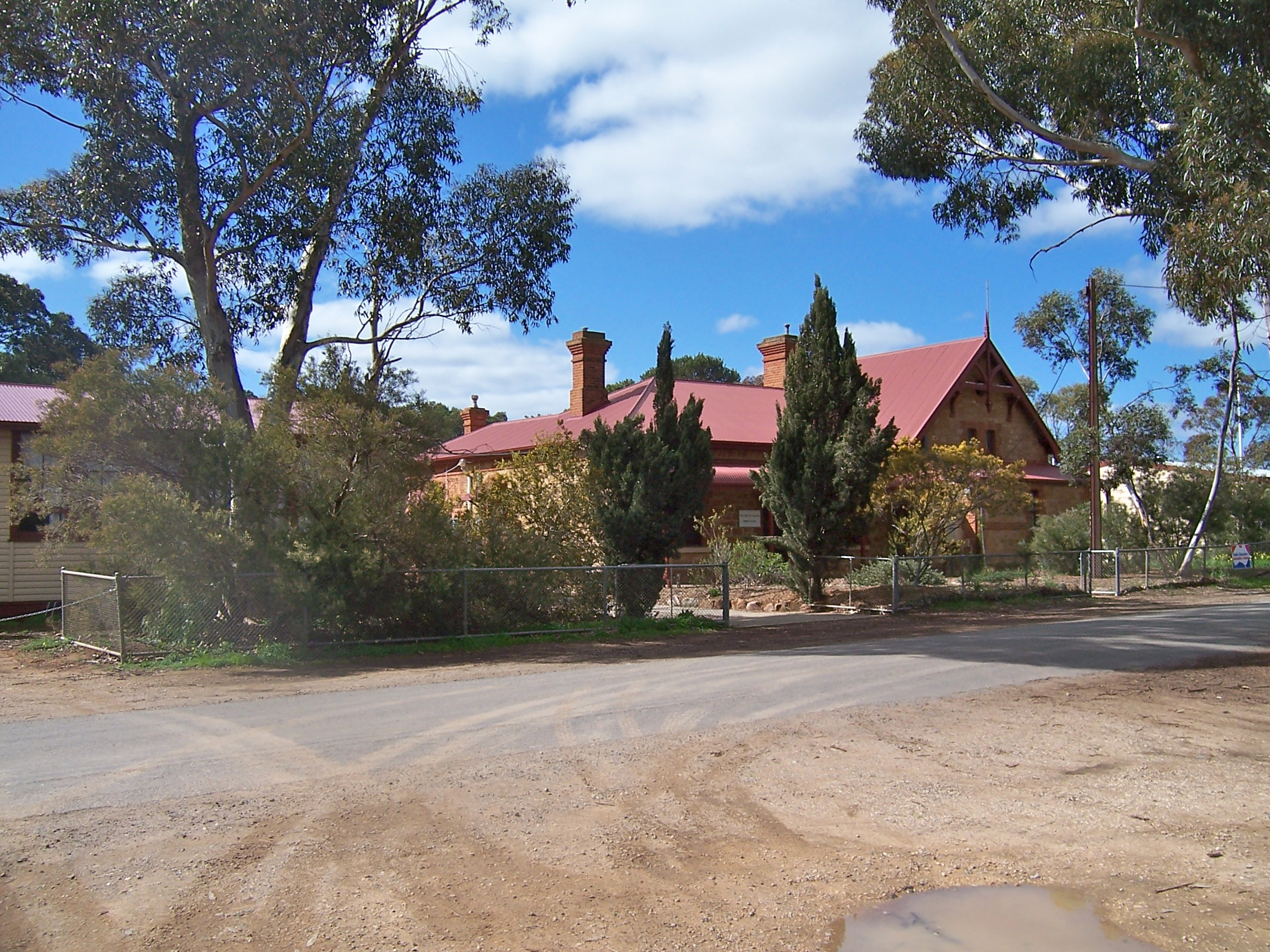
Callington Primary School main building

According to the 2006 census, Callington had 387 residents, almost half aged 25–54 years, and the median age was 34. Almost 90% of them were born in Australia.

== Recreation ==
Callington is home to the Bremer Callington Cricket Club which plays in the Alexandra and Eastern Hills Cricket Association since the merger of the Bremer Cricket Club and the Callington Cricket Club in 1970. The Bridgewater Callington Raiders plays Australian rules football home matches at both Bridgewater and Callington in the Hills Football League.

== Education ==
Callington has a kindergarten and a primary school in the town. Students need to travel to Mount Barker, Strathalbyn or Murray Bridge for high school.

== See also ==
- List of cities and towns in South Australia
