= Local Government Areas (Re-arrangement) Acts 1929 and 1931 =

Acts of the Parliament of South Australia

The Local Government Areas (Re-arrangement) Acts 1929 and 1931 were acts of the Parliament of South Australia. The application of the acts, via recommendations of the commission of the same name, led to the statewide re-arrangement of local government areas, effected from 1932 to 1935.

== Rearrangements in 1932 ==
Incomplete list:

- Beachport annexed most of Kennion effective 12 May
- Clare annexed part of Stanley
- New district Eudunda was created by the union of Julia and Neales effective 12 May
- Kanyaka annexed part of Woolundunga
- Kapunda annexed Belvidere, part of Gilbert and part of Hamilton effective 12 May
- New district Laura was created by the union of Booyoolie and Laura town effective 30 April
- Lucindale annexed part of Kennion effective 12 May
- New district Owen was created by the union of Alma Plains and Dalkey effective 12 May
- Port Augusta town annexed Davenport town Port Augusta West town and part of Woolundunga effective 28 April
- Port Elliot district annexed Port Elliot town and Goolwa town effective 12 May
- Port MacDonnell annexed part of Benara
- New district Riverton was created by the union of Rhynie, Stockport and most of Gilbert effective 12 May
- New district Robertstown was created by the union of Apoinga and English
- Saddleworth annexed Waterloo, most of Hamilton and part of Stanley effective 12 May
- Tantanoola annexed part of Benara and District of Mount Gambier West effective 23 May
- Willunga annexed Aldinga effective 12 May
- New district Yorketown was created by the union of Dalrymple, Melville and Yorketown town

== Rearrangements in 1933 ==
Incomplete list:

- Gawler town annexed Gawler South and a small part of Munno Para West effective 22 June
- Gladstone town annexed Gladstone district effective 15 May
- New district Keyneton and Swan Reach was created from the union of Keyneton and most of Swan Reach effective 18 September
- New district Munno Para was created from the union of Munno Para East and a large part of the Munno Para West effective 22 June
- New district Salisbury was created from the union of Yatala North and part of Munno Para West effective 22 June
- Truro annexed part of Swan Reach
- Waikerie annexed part of Swan Reach
- New district Wilmington was created by the union of Hammond, most of Woolundunga and part of Port Germein effective 16 February

== Rearrangements in 1935 ==
Incomplete list:

- Balaklava annexed part of Hall effective 1 May
- Barossa annexed Mount Crawford and a small part of Para Wirra effective 1 May
- Blyth annexed a large part of Hall and part of Hutt and Hill Rivers effective 1 May
- New district Burra Burra was created from the union of Burra, Hanson, Mount Bryan and a large part of Booborowie effective 1 May
- Clare annexed part of Hutt and Hill Rivers
- East Torrens annexed part of Crafers
- Eudunda annexed part of Robertstown effective 1 May
- New district Gumeracha was created from the union of Para Wirra and Talunga
- New district Jamestown was created from union of Caltowie, most of Belalie and part of Yongala
- Hallett annexed part of Booborowie and a small part of Belalie
- New district Light (soon renamed Mallala) was created from the union of Port Gawler, Dublin and Grace effective 1 May
- New district Marne was created from the union of Angas and Caurnamont effective 1 May
- New district Meadows was created from the union of most parts of Clarendon, Kondoparinga, Echunga, Macclesfield, a small part of Strathalbyn, and a small part of the Mount Barker effective 1 May
- Mobilong annexed Monarto, Brinkley, part of Mannum, and a small part of Onaunga effective 1 May
- Mount Barker annexed a large part of Nairne, part of Echunga and part of Macclesfield effective 1 May
- New district Mount Pleasant was created from the union of Tungkillo, Springton, a small part of Mannum and a small part of Mobilong effective 1 May
- Onkaparinga annexed part of Crafers
- New district Peterborough was created from the union of Coglin and most of Yongala
- Spalding annexed part of Hutt and Hill Rivers
- Stirling annexed most of Crafers effective 1 May
- Strathalbyn annexed Bremer, most of Onaunga, part of Brinkley, and part of Kondoparinga effective 1 May
- Tea Tree Gully annexed Highercombe and a small part of Para Wirra effective 1 May
- Terowie annexed part of Booborowie
- Tumby Bay annexed part of Cleve effective 1 May

== See also ==
- District Councils Act 1887
