= Hundred of Forster =

Forster
- Cadastral division
- Coordinates: 34.779°S 139.667°E
- Country: Australia
- State: South Australia
- Region: Murray Mallee
- LGA(s): Mid Murray Council
- Established: 1 May 1883

Area
  - Total: 270 km^{2} (104 sq mi)
- County: Albert
Lands administrative divisions around Forster
Ridley	Nildottie	Bakara
Ridley	Forster	Bandon
Younghusband	Bowhill	Vincent

The Hundred of Forster, formerly the hundreds of Giles and Morphett, is a cadastral hundred in the County of Albert, South Australia.

The localities of Forster, Purnong, and Claypans are within the hundred along with a large southern part of the bounded locality of Nildottie.

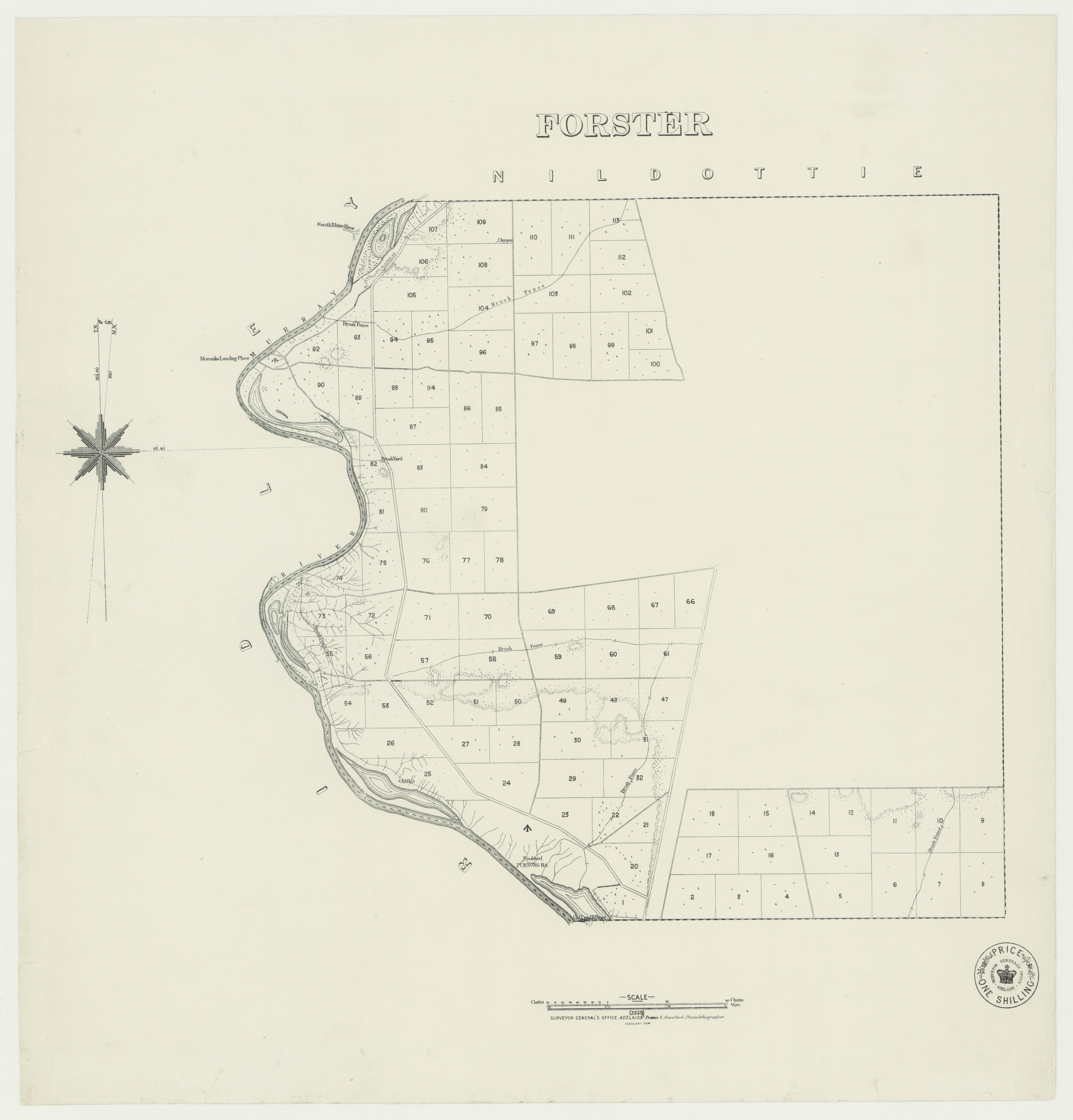
Plan of the Hundred of Forster, 1884

== History ==
The Hundred of the Murray was the first cadastral division made in the space now occupied by the Hundred of Forster. When roughly half of Murray was split into smaller hundreds in 1860, the Hundred of Giles and Hundred of Morphett were gazetted and occupied northern and southern parts, respectively, of the same land. These divisions were short lived, however, as the Hundred of Forster and southerly adjacent Hundred of Bowhill were proclaimed in 1883 and Giles and Morphett were abolished. Part of Morphett came to be within the new Hundred of Forster while the most part became the new Hundred of Bowhill.

In 1888 the District Councils Act 1887 forced the annexation of the Hundred of Forster by the District Council of Caurnamont, seated at Walker Flat on the other side of the river, bringing local government to the hundred for the first time. In 1935, most of the Caurnamount council, including the Hundred of Forster, amalgamated with the District Council of Angas to form the District Council of Marne. Marne became a part of the consolidated District Council of Ridley in 1976 and then part of the much larger District Council of Ridley-Truro in 1991. In 1997 Ridley-Truro was abolished by amalgamation with the district councils of Mannum, Morgan and part of Mount Pleasant to form the new Mid Murray Council, which locally administers the hundred at present.

== See also ==
- Lands administrative divisions of South Australia
