= Hundred of the Murray =

Hundred of the Murray South Australia
- Coordinates: 35.3324°S 139.3832°E
- Established: 1 July 1854
- Abolished: 30 June 1870
- Region: Murray Mallee
- County: Sturt; Eyre; Russell; Albert; Young

The Hundred of the Murray (later called Hundred of Murray) was a cadastral hundred in South Australia spanning land two miles either side of the navigable portion of the Murray River in the 1850s and 1860s.

The hundred was gazetted on 10 November 1853 and promulgated on 1 July 1854. The bounds were described as "all those Lands which lie within the distance of two miles from either of the two opposite banks of the River Murray, within the province of South Australia, together with all those lands which lie within the distance of two miles from the north shore of Lake Alexandrina, between Salt Creek Trigonometrical Station and the Murray, and two miles from the east shores of Lakes Alexandrina and Albert, and also all the land in the County of Russell lying west of Lake Albert".

In March 1847 a Royal Order had made in the neighbouring provinces of Victoria and New South Wales to prevent pastoral leases being made on land within 3 miles of a sea coast or within two miles of a bank of several important rivers. The government of South Australian decided to follow suit with regard to the Murray River, making reference to the 1847 Royal Order in justification of the new land administration division.

The hundred thus effectively prevented ordinary pastoral leases near the river from encroaching on the banks of the Murray from the mouth (at present-day Wellington) all the way to at least the present-day Waikerie crossing. The hundred overlaid the boundaries of the pre-existing cadastral counties of Russell, Sturt and Eyre.

On 19 April 1860 two further riverside counties were proclaimed to cover the riverlands up to Wachtels Lagoon at present-day Kingston On Murray. These were the County of Albert on the left (south) bank and the County of Young on the right (north) bank. On the same day, more than half of the Hundred of the Murray was split into 24 new hundreds spread over the five counties now adjacent to the river, with the eastern stretch of the hundred remaining but now called Hundred of Murray. The new hundreds were as follows:

- In the County of Sturt: Brinkley, Mobilong, Finniss, Angas, and Ridley;
- In the County of Eyre: Bagot, Fisher, Anna, Skurray, Hay, and Eba;
- In the County of Young: Stuart;
- In the County of Albert: Cadell, Randell (now Murbko), Paisley, Cooper (now Nildottie), and Giles (now Forster);
- In the unincorporated land at present-day Chucka Bend that would later be proclaimed the County of Buccleuch: Morphett (now Bowhill and part of Forster);
- In the County of Russell: Younghusband, Burdett, Seymour, Malcolm, Bonney, and Baker.

The remaining Hundred of Murray in the far east riverlands of the state was abolished in 1870.
