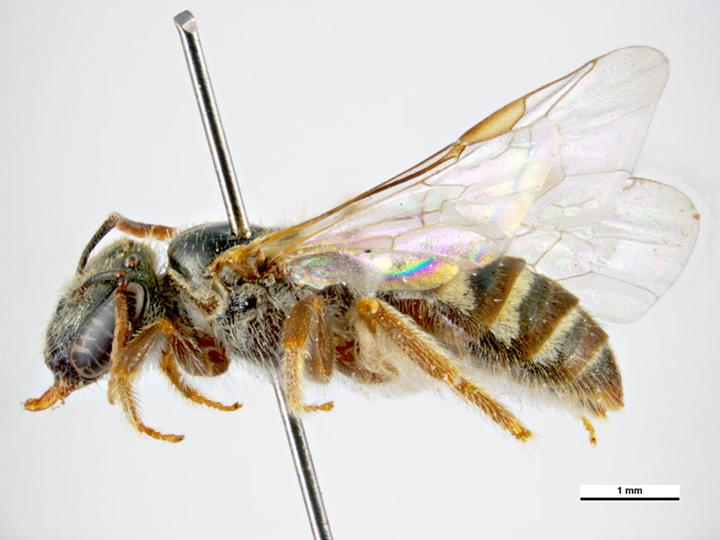
- Female
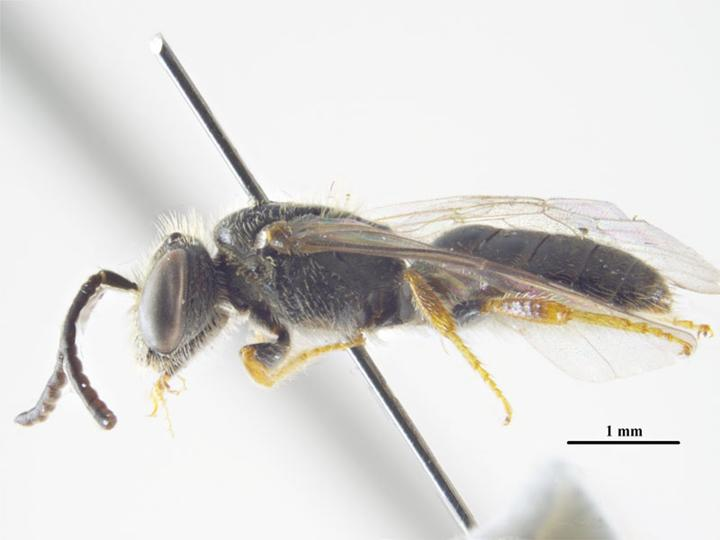
- Male

Scientific classification
- Kingdom: Animalia
- Phylum: Arthropoda
- Clade: Pancrustacea
- Class: Insecta
- Order: Hymenoptera
- Family: Halictidae
- Genus: Lasioglossum
- Species: L. mediopolitum

Binomial name
- Lasioglossum mediopolitum (Cockerell, 1914)

Synonyms
- Halictus mediopolitus Cockerell, 1914

= Lasioglossum mediopolitum =

Species of bee

Lasioglossum mediopolitum, or Lasioglossum (Chilalictus) mediopolitum, is a species of bee in the family Halictidae and subfamily Halictinae. It is endemic to Australia. It was described by British-American entomologist Theodore Dru Alison Cockerell in 1914.

== Description ==
Female body length is about 6.5 mm. Integumental colouration is mainly black, with reddish markings; the hair is cream to pale brown.

== Distribution and habitat ==
The species occurs across southern mainland Australia. The type locality is Purnong, South Australia.

== Behaviour ==
The adults are flying mellivores. Flowering plants visited by the bees include Acacia, Atalaya, Eremophila, Eucalyptus, Santalum, Grevillea, Melaleuca, Scabiosa, Schinus and Thryptomene species.
