= Greenbanks, South Australia =

Greenbanks South Australia
- Coordinates: 35.05532°S 139.34994°E
- Postcode(s): 5253
- Area: 0.04 km^{2} (0.0 sq mi) (Note: Area includes portion of Murray River in line with locality to the centre of the river.)
- LGA(s): Rural City of Murray Bridge
- State electorate(s): Hammond
- Federal division(s): Barker
Localities around Greenbanks:
Mypolonga	Mypolonga	Mypolonga
Willow Banks	Greenbanks	Sunnyside
Willow Banks	Sunnyside	Sunnyside

Greenbanks is a hamlet and semi-rural locality of Murray Bridge on the east (left) bank of the Murray River. It is sandwiched between the larger east-bank localities of Willow Banks, on the west, and Sunnyside on the east. Greenbanks Drive is the only road within the locality, and is accessible only via Clifftop Drive, Sunnyside or Sunnyside Road.
