= Leioproctus rufus =

Scientific classification
- Kingdom: Animalia
- Phylum: Arthropoda
- Clade: Pancrustacea
- Class: Insecta
- Order: Hymenoptera
- Family: Colletidae
- Genus: Leioproctus
- Species: L. rufus

Binomial name
- Leioproctus rufus (Rayment, 1930)

Synonyms
- Paracolletes rufa Rayment, 1930

Species of bee

Leioproctus rufus is a species of bee in the family Colletidae and subfamily Colletinae. It is endemic to Australia. It was described by Australian entomologist Tarlton Rayment in 1930.

== Description ==
Male body length is about 11 mm. Integumental colouration is mainly black, with dorsal segments of the abdomen chestnut-red; the hair golden.

== Distribution and habitat ==
The species occurs in South Australia. The type locality is Purnong.

== Behaviour ==
The adults are flying mellivores.
