= District Council of Caurnamont =

District Council of Caurnamont South Australia
- Coordinates: 34°45′09″S 139°33′23″E
- Established: 25 June 1885
- Abolished: 21 March 1935
- Council seat: Walkers Flat
LGAs around District Council of Caurnamont:
Keyneton	Blanchetown	Blanchetown
Angas	Caurnamont	East Murray
Mannum	Mannum	East Murray

The District Council of Caurnamont was a local government area in South Australia seated at Walkers Flat on the right bank of the Murray River from 1885 until 1935.

The council was gazetted on 25 June 1885 as comprising the Hundred of Ridley in the County of Russell. The early council meetings were held at a house in the riverside township of Caurnamont until a council chamber was built at Walker's Flat in 1896.

In 1935 the council was abolished with the southern part of the Hundred of Bowhill annexed by District Council of Karoonda and the remainder amalgamated with the District Council of Angas to form the new District Council of Marne.
