= Ngaut Ngaut Conservation Park =

Protected area in South Australia

- IUCN category III (natural monument or feature)
- Location within South Australia
- Location: South Australia, Nildottie
- Coordinates: 34°41′23″S 139°36′22″E
- Area: 49 ha (120 acres)
- Established: 17 June 1976
- Governing body: Mannum Aboriginal Community Association Incorporated (MACAI); Government of South Australia
- Website: Official website

Ngaut Ngaut Conservation Park, formerly Ngautngaut Conservation Park, is a protected area in the Australian state of South Australia. it is on the Eastern bank of the Murray River downstream of the town of Nildottie. It is co-managed by the Government of South Australia and the Nganguraku people.

The conservation park consists of land in sections 88, 89 and 413 in the cadastral unit of the Hundred of Nildottie. The land first received protected area status as a conservation park proclaimed under the National Parks and Wildlife Act 1972 on 17 June 1976 in respect to sections 88 and 89. Land in section 413 was added on 25 August 2005. Its name was changed from "Ngautngaut" to "Ngaut Ngaut" on 28 September 2006 to "reflect the accepted Aboriginal spelling of the rock shelter" after which the conservation park was named. As of 2019, it covered an area of 49 hectares (120 acres).

It is the birthplace of the "black duck dreaming" and preserves Aboriginal rock art and culture.

The conservation park is classified as IUCN Category III protected area.
