= Corporate Town of Burra =

Local government area in South Australia

Coordinates: 33°40′51″S 138°56′20″E

Seat of the former Corporate Town of Burra in South Australia

The Corporate Town of Burra was a local government area in South Australia from 1876 to 1969.

The municipality was proclaimed on 29 June 1876 following the necessary petition of residents in the townships of Aberdeen, Kooringa and Redruth, severing the area from the new District Council of Burra. It was divided into three wards at its inception: North Ward, Middle Ward and South Ward (North, East, and West Wards from 1884). The proclamation named Philip Lane as the first mayor, and George Sara and August Bartholomaus (North Ward), Robert Sanders and Edward Lipsett (Middle Ward), and Joseph Roberts and John Snell (South Ward) as the first councillors. It met for the first time on 10 July, and established a council chamber in the Burra Institute. The creation of the Burra corporation followed an unsuccessful attempt in 1875 by the residents of the northern townships of Aberdeen and Redruth to form their own corporation.

The municipality used a shaft of the Bon Accord mine as its water supply from 1884 to 1905. In 1911, the council initiated a public fund for the construction of the historic Market Square Rotunda in honour of King Edward VII. In 1945, the committee of the Burra Institute transferred the building to the council, which renamed it the Burra Town Hall and began screening films in the hall to pay down the debt. The Burra Hospital was also vested in the council, although separately managed.

It voluntarily amalgamated with the surrounding District Council of Burra Burra in 1969, which added a three-member Town Ward to represent the area of the former municipality.

== Mayors of Burra ==
- Philip Lane (1876-1877)
- Edward Lipsett (1877-1879)
- Philip Lane (1879-1881)
- Edward Catchlove Lockyer (1881-1883)
- Robert Brummitt (1883-1884)
- John Dunstan Jr. (1884-1885)
- Daniel Spencer Packard (1885-1886)
- Frederick Holder (1886-1887)
- Philip Lander Killicoat (1887-1888)
- Frederick Holder (1888-1889)
- Thomas Wesley Wilkinson (1889-1890)
- William West (1890-1892)
- William Thomas Rabbich (1892-1893)
- Philip Lander Killicoat (1893-1894)
- Robert Brummitt (1894-1897)
- John Sampson Jr. (1897-1899)
- Ernest William Crewes (1899-1901)
- Alexander Harris (1901)
- Ernest William Crewes (1902)
- John Sampson Jr. (1902-1903)
- John Edwin Hyde Winnall (1903-1905)
- John Drew (1905-1906)
- William Charles Leonard West (1906-1908)
- John Ikin Sangster Jr. (1908-1909)
- Samuel Burns (1909-1910)
- John McLaren (1910-1913)
- Ernest William Crewes (1913-1919)
- Stanley Monteith Lane (1919-1920)
- Ernest William Crewes (1920-1922)
- Maurice Collins (1922-1928)
- Alfred Benjamin Riggs (1928-1930)
- Thomas Henry Woollacott (1930-1937)
- Stanley Kellaway (1937-1939)
- Thomas Henry Woollacott (1939-1946)
- Horton Joseph Barraclough Jennison (1946-1948)
- Frank Teare Marston (1948-1950)
- William Carpenter (1950-1954)
- Edward Thomas Baulderstone (1954-1969)
