= Clem Hawke =

Australian clergyman (1898–1989)

The Reverend Clem Hawke

General Secretary of the Australian Labor Party in South Australia
- In office 1919–1920
- Appointed by: John Gunn
- Leader: John Gunn

Minister of the Congregational Church
- In office 1920–?
- Nominated by: W. G. Torr
- Appointed by: Edward S. Kiek

Personal details
- Born: Arthur Clarence Hawke; 5 March 1898 Kapunda, South Australia
- Died: 23 December 1989 (aged 91) Malvern, South Australia
- Party: Labor
- Spouse: Edith Lee (m. 1920; wid. 1979)
- Children: 2, including Bob Hawke
- Relatives: See Hawke family
- Education: School of Mines, Kapunda
- Alma mater: Adelaide College of Divinity, Parkin Campus

Military service
- Allegiance: Commonwealth of Australia
- Branch/service: Australian Imperial Force
- Years of service: 1939–1945
- Rank: Captain
- Unit: 6th Division
- Battles/wars: World War II

Arthur Clarence "Clem" Hawke (5 March 1898 – 23 December 1989) was the General Secretary of the Australian Labor Party in South Australia 1919–1920, and a Congregationalist minister.

He was the father of Bob Hawke, Prime Minister of Australia 1983–1991; and brother of Bert Hawke, MHA for Burra Burra, South Australia 1924–1927 and Premier of Western Australia 1953–1959.

== History ==
Hawke was born in Kapunda, South Australia, a son of miner James Renfrey Hawke (25 September 1862 – 13 September 1930) and his wife Elizabeth Ann Hawke (née Pascoe; 31 December 1862 – 27 December 1946). Hawke left school at age 12 and worked at a number of jobs including blacksmithing while studying at the School of Mines in Kapunda. He trained for the ministry at Brighton under Dr. William George Torr and served as Methodist home missionary at Forster in the South Australian Riverland, Port Neill and Kalangadoo.

In 1919 he became General Secretary of the Australian Labor Party in South Australia. It was at Forster in 1919 that he met schoolteacher Edith Emily Lee. They married in Adelaide the following year. He was ordained a Congregationalist minister and conducted services at the Halifax Street Congregational Mission. His first posting was to the Adelaide Hills town of Houghton, which he carried off successfully, and during that time their first son Neil was born. He was posted to New Zealand from 1923 and spent several years there before returning to South Australia, when he served at Renmark, then Bordertown from 1928 to 1935, living in the manse on Farquhar Street. He was well received by the local population, both as a keen cricketer and footballer and for his thoughtful well-prepared sermons. It was here that Bob was born and spent his early years. Their next move was to Maitland on Yorke Peninsula.

In November 1939, after elder son Neil died of meningitis, they moved to West Leederville, a suburb of Perth, Western Australia, while Bob attended Perth Modern School and University of Western Australia. Clem enlisted with the 2nd AIF as chaplain with the rank of captain. After the war he was appointed minister to the Subiaco Congregational Church, where he served until at least 1950.

His wife died in 1979 after a long stroke-induced illness.

It was on his 85th birthday on 5 March 1983 that his son was elected Prime Minister. Clem returned to Bordertown in 1987 to unveil a bust of his famous son. Two years later he died of a stroke at the Resthaven nursing home in the Adelaide suburb of Malvern, having suffered deteriorating health for several weeks.

== Legacy ==
Bob Hawke, who was particularly close to his father, said on the Channel 9 program A Current Affair, "He's passed on to me the fundamental beliefs I have, and that is: we are in this world not just to advance our own interests but we owe an obligation to our fellow human beings".

== Family ==
Clem Hawke married Edith Emily "Ellie" Lee (1 October 1896 – September 1979) in June 1920. They had two sons:

- John Neil Hawke (1 March 1921 – 27 February 1939)
- Robert James Lee "Bob" Hawke (9 December 1929 – 16 May 2019)
