= Caurnamont, South Australia =

Locality in South Australia

Caurnamont South Australia
- Coordinates: 34.84°S 139.59°E
- Population: 35 (SAL 2021)
- Established: 1885
- Postcode(s): 5238
- Location: 30 km (19 mi) northeast of Mannum; 60 km (37 mi) south of Blanchetown
- LGA(s): Mid Murray Council
- State electorate(s): Chaffey
- Federal division(s): Barker
Localities around Caurnamont:
	Purnong
Walker Flat	Caurnamont
Younghusband	Teal Flat	Bowhill

Caurnamont is a farming locality on the right bank of the Murray River in the Murraylands region of South Australia. It has river shacks and houseboats along part of its riverbank.

The locality lies on the right bank of the Murray River inside of a wide meandering series of bends. The river arrives from the north and trends southeast then west forming the majority of the boundary of Caurnamont. The western boundary is with Walker Flat, which reaches the river both upstream and downstream of Caurnamont. The boundaries for the long-established name were set in 2003. Its name is from a sheep station run by Robert Thompson, and may derive from an Aboriginal name meaning high or beautiful cliffs.

There was a District Council of Caurnamont from 1885 until 1935.
