= Cowirra, South Australia =

Cowirra South Australia
- Coordinates: 34.904°S 139.333°E
- Population: 155 (SAL 2021)
- Established: 1901
- Postcode(s): 5238
- LGA(s): Mid Murray Council
- State electorate(s): Hammond
- Federal division(s): Barker
Localities around Cowirra:
| | | Frahns |
| Mannum, Bolto | Cowirra | Younghusband |
| | Ponde | Burdett |

Cowirra is a locality in the Murraylands region of South Australia. It is on the left (east) bank of the Murray River, opposite Mannum.

== Geography ==
Much of the river frontage is low-lying flats, laid out as long, narrow, irrigated paddocks between the river and the rising ground (or low cliffs) to the east. Cowirra includes the eastern landing points of the Mannum ferries, and the area known as Mannum East. The higher ground is used for a variety of farming activities, including sheep, grain, beef cattle and potatoes.

Downstream of the ferry landing is a separate locality named Bolto, consisting mainly of shacks near the river bank.

== History ==
The township of Cowirra was laid out and named in 1901. Ten quarter-acre blocks sold for an average of 5 shillings above the reserve price of £2 10/ in April 1907. The boundaries of the locality were formalised in 2003.

The Cowirra Swamp was drained in 1919 to allow for controlled irrigation. Work commenced in 1916, but the flood of 1917 damaged the unfinished embankments, leading to fresh inundation. The reclaimed swamps were made available for soldier settlement following World War I.
