= Bolto, South Australia =

Locality in South Australia

Bolto South Australia
- Coordinates: 34.915°S 139.316°E
- Population: 14 (SAL 2021)
- Postcode(s): 5238
- LGA(s): Mid Murray Council
- State electorate(s): Hammond
- Federal division(s): Barker
Localities around Bolto:
| Mannum | Bolto | Cowirra |

Bolto is a locality in the Murraylands region of South Australia. It consists of a row of shacks and a campsite on the eastern side of the Murray River opposite Mannum. It is faced by Mannum on the other side of the river and is completely surrounded by Cowirra on the east side.
