= Toora, South Australia =

Toora South Australia
- Coordinates: 35.0775°S 139.3013°E
- Population: 41 (SAL 2021)
- Postcode(s): 5253
- LGA(s): Rural City of Murray Bridge
- State electorate(s): Hammond
- Federal division(s): Barker
Localities around Toora:
Mypolonga	Mypolonga	Murrawong
Murray Bridge North	Toora	Burdett
Mobilong	Riverglades	Avoca Dell
- Footnotes: Coordinates

Toora is a satellite locality of Murray Bridge in South Australia. Its boundaries were formalised in 2000. It was named for the Toora Irrigation Area on the west bank of the Murray River.

== See also ==
- List of cities and towns in South Australia
