= District Council of English =

Former local government area of South Australia

Coordinates: 34°04′33″S 139°03′02″E

Seat of the former District Council of English in South Australia

The District Council of English was a local government area in South Australia from 1878 to 1932.

The council was proclaimed on 31 October 1878, consisting of the whole of the cadastral Hundred of English, in which residents had been advocating for their own district council since at least 1873. The first five councillors were appointed in the founding proclamation: Albert Day, John Farley, George Jansen, Wilhelm Ferdinand Sieber, and Johann Miekel. It gained the neighbouring Hundred of Bower under the District Councils Act 1887, with the new area represented by two additional councillors. The council seat was located at Point Pass, even though the largest town in the district was Robertstown. The council had four wards: Bower Ward, Emmaus Ward, Robertstown Ward and Point Pass Ward.

The council amalgamated with the adjacent District Council of Apoinga to form the District Council of Robertstown on 5 May 1932, becoming the English and Point Pass wards of the new council. The English council had strongly protested any alteration of its boundaries; although unsuccessful in stopping the merger, local opposition did overturn an earlier plan to split the Point Pass area from the new council and place it in the District Council of Eudunda. One former English chairman, A. W. Farley, had been a lone voice in support of the merger, claiming that the councils "had been bankrupt for ten years, inferior metal had been placed on the roads which did not last, and the money had been frittered away."

== Chairmen ==
Name	dates	notes
J. G. Ruediger	1887	
Day	1890	
Johann Wilhelm Nicolai	1892–1894	
H Klabe	1912	
E. G. Schmidt	1928–1929	
