= Avoca Dell, South Australia =

Avoca Dell
- Town
- Coordinates: 35.091760°S 139.3119°E
- Country: Australia
- State: South Australia
- LGA: Rural City of Murray Bridge

Government
  - State electorate: Hammond
  - Federal division: Barker

Area
  - Total: 0.72 km^{2} (0.28 sq mi)

Population
  - Total: 166 (SAL 2021)
- Postcode: 5253
Localities around Avoca Dell
Toora	Toora	Burdett
Toora	Avoca Dell	Burdett
Riverglades	Murray Bridge East	Murray Bridge East

Avoca Dell is a hamlet and north suburban locality of Murray Bridge on the east (left) bank of the Murray River. It is named for the PS Avoca, a paddle steamer built in 1877 that used the location as a landing point in the 1960s. The Avoca Dell Picnic Grounds reserve is situated within the locality on the river bank where the steamer would dock.
