= Ponde, South Australia =

Ponde South Australia
- Coordinates: 34.9575°S 139.3013°E
- Population: 59 (SAL 2021)
- Postcode(s): 5238
- LGA(s): Mid Murray Council
- State electorate(s): Hammond
- Federal division(s): Barker
Localities around Ponde:
Mannum	Cowirra	Younghusband
Caloote	Ponde	Burdett
Zadows Landing	Wall Flat	Pompoota

Ponde is a locality in the Murraylands region of South Australia, on the inside of a bend on the left bank of the Murray River. Its name is derived from the Ngarrindjeri name for the Murray cod.

Ponde was the site of an annual music festival from 1979 to 2002.
