= Lowan Conservation Park =

Protected area in South Australia

- IUCN category III (natural monument or feature)
- Location within South Australia
- Location: South Australia, Bowhill
- Nearest city: Perponda
- Coordinates: 34°58′40″S 139°41′11″E
- Area: 6.75 km^{2} (2.61 sq mi)
- Established: 9 September 1971
- Governing body: Department for Environment and Water

Lowan Conservation Park (formerly Lowan National Park) is a protected area located in the Australian state of South Australia in the locality of Bowhill about 99 kilometres (62 mi) east of the state capital of Adelaide and about 9 kilometres (5.6 mi) west of the town of Perponda.

The conservation park consists of crown land in sections 71 and 73 in the cadastral unit of the Hundred of Bowhill. Section 71 was purchased by the South Australian government on the advice of “the Land Board and National Parks Council” from the owner “who were anxious to see scrub remain on the block”. It acquired protected area status as the Lowan National Park on 9 September 1971 by proclamation under the National Parks Act 1966. On 27 April 1972, it was reconstituted as the Lowan Conservation Park upon the proclamation of the National Parks and Wildlife Act 1972. On 2 August 1973, land in section 73 of the Hundred of Bowhill was added to the conservation park. As of 2016, it covered an area of 6.75 square kilometres (2.61 sq mi).

In 1980, it was described as follows:

An area of mallee scrub supporting breeding populations of mallee fowl and wedge-tailed eagles. A gently undulating area of mallee scrub the principal species being Eucalyptus socialis, E. gracilis and E. Dumosa with an understorey of acacia species. Rabbits are abundant in the park and excessive grazing is preventing adequate regeneration of some species. The surrounding land is developed for the wheat / sheep agricultural industry.

The conservation park is classified as an IUCN Category III protected area. In 1980, it was listed on the now-defunct Register of the National Estate.

== See also ==
- Protected areas of South Australia
