= Murray Bridge Training Area =

- Burdett; Near Murray Bridge in Australia

Site information
- Type: Training area
- Owner: Department of Defence (Australia)
- Operator: Australian Army

Location
- Location of Murray Bridge Training Area
- Coordinates: 35°07′00″S 139°16′00″E
- Area: 42 square kilometres (16 square miles)

Site history
- Built: prior to 1970

The Murray Bridge Training Area (also called Murray Bridge Army Training Area) is an Australian Army training area located in South Australia in the locality of Burdett about 7 kilometres (4.3 miles) east of the city of Murray Bridge and about 70 kilometres (43 miles) east of the centre of the city of Adelaide. The training area was established prior to 1970. As of 2011, the training area contained shooting ranges for use with small arms for distances up to 800 metres (2,600 feet), space for the training of subunits from Australian Army units located within South Australia and support facilities such as a “vehicle maintenance compound.” An area of about 71 hectares (180 acres) within the training area was developed as an artificial wetland in 1992 for the purpose of treating effluent that would otherwise have been discharged into the Murray River. This wetland has been listed as a wetland of national importance since at least 1995.

== See also ==
- Adelaide Universities Regiment
- Australian Army Cadets
