= Murray Bridge East, South Australia =

Murray Bridge East
- Suburb
- Interactive map of Murray Bridge East
- Coordinates: 35.117°S 139.311°E
- Country: Australia
- State: South Australia
- City: Murray Bridge
- LGA: Rural City of Murray Bridge

Government
  - State electorate: Hammond
  - Federal division: Barker

Population
  - Total: 1,196 (SAL 2021)
- Postcode: 5253
Suburbs around Murray Bridge East
Mobilong	Riverglades; Avoca Dell	Burdett
Murray Bridge	Murray Bridge East	Burdett
Long Flat	Monteith	Kepa

Murray Bridge East is a semi-rural satellite locality of Murray Bridge in South Australia east of the Murray River and the eponymous bridge. Its boundaries were formalised in March 2000 to cover a portion of land immediately across the river to the east of the main Murray Bridge conurbation. It is bounded on the southwest by the Adelaide-Melbourne railway line and the defunct Rabila Railway Station is thus on the locality's southern boundary. The Karoonda Highway motor traffic route commences at Murray Bridge East and heads northeast through Karoonda to Loxton.

== See also ==
- List of cities and towns in South Australia
