= Pompoota, South Australia =

Pompoota South Australia
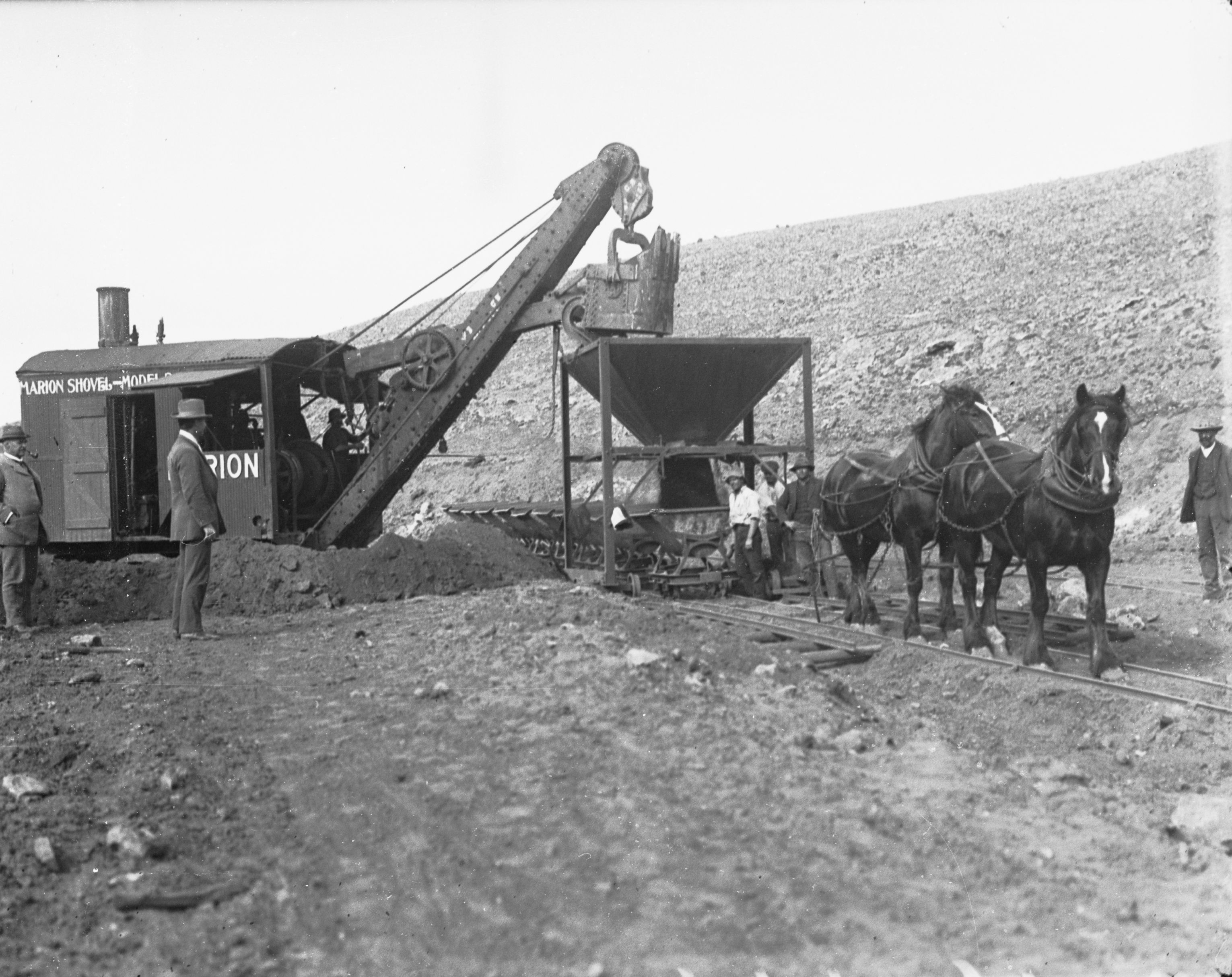
- Marion steam shovel excavating at Pompoota Flat, 1913

- Coordinates: 34.99°S 139.34°E
- Population: 65 (SAL 2021)
- Postcode(s): 5238
- LGA(s): Mid Murray Council
- State electorate(s): Hammond
- Federal division(s): Barker
Localities around Pompoota:
Across Murray River Wall Flat	Ponde
Woodlane	Pompoota	Burdett
Mypolonga

Pompoota is a locality in the Murray Mallee region of South Australia, on the east (left) bank of the Murray River, downstream of Mannum. It has shacks and irrigated floodplains near the river, and dryland farming on the higher ground away from the river. The locality of Burdett wraps around the eastern side of Pompoota, with a short stretch of river frontage south (downstream) of Pompoota.

== Training farm ==
Pompoota was the site of a training farm established in 1917. The farm was part of a scheme to teach returning soldiers from World War I before taking up land under a soldier settlement scheme. It was the first formal repatriation plan for returned soldiers to learn farming when they returned from the war. The hall built as part of the scheme was still in use as a community hall a hundred years later. The training farm was an initiative of Samuel McIntosh who had observed the Village Settlements twenty years earlier in which unemployed city people were provided with land and expected to be able to clear and farm it with no relevant experience in farming.
