= Riverglades, South Australia =

Riverglades
- Town
- Coordinates: 35.1015°S 139.3024°E
- Country: Australia
- State: South Australia
- LGA: Rural City of Murray Bridge

Government
  - State electorate: Hammond
  - Federal division: Barker

Area
  - Total: 2.5 km^{2} (0.97 sq mi)

Population
  - Total: 856 (SAL 2021)
- Postcode: 5253
Localities around Riverglades
Toora	Toora	Avoca Dell
Mobilong	Riverglades	Murray Bridge East
Murray Bridge East	Murray Bridge East	Murray Bridge East

Riverglades is a north suburban locality of Murray Bridge on the east (left) bank of the Murray River.

It is bounded by the Murray River on the north west Loddon Road on the northeast, Mitchell Avenue on the southeast, and Thule Drive (and south-side Thule Drive properties near the river bank) on the south west.
