= Nildottie, South Australia =

Nildottie
- Suburb
- Coordinates: 34°40′40″S 139°39′01″E
- Country: Australia
- State: South Australia
- Region: Murray and Mallee
- LGA: Mid Murray Council
- Location: 99 km (62 mi) E of Adelaide; 40 km (25 mi) NE of Mannum
- Established: 27 March 2003

Government
  - State electorate: Chaffey
  - Federal division: Barker

Population
  - Total: 220 (SAL 2021)
- Time zone: UTC+9:30 (ACST)
  - Summer (DST): UTC+10:30 (ACDT)
- Postcode: 5238
- County: Albert
- Mean max temp: 23.6 °C (74.5 °F)
- Mean min temp: 9.2 °C (48.6 °F)
- Annual rainfall: 341.5 mm (13.44 in)
Suburbs around Nildottie
Swan Reach	Swan Reach	Bakara
Sunnydale; Wongulla; Forster; Walker Flat	Nildottie	Bakara; Copeville
Purnong	Purnong; Claypans	Copeville
- Locations; Adjoining localities

Nildottie is a locality in the Australian state of South Australia located on the east side of the Murray River about 99 kilometres (62 mi) east of the state capital of Adelaide and about 40 kilometres (25 mi) north-east of the municipal seat in Mannum.

Nildottie is located within the federal division of Barker, the state electoral district of Chaffey and the local government area of the Mid Murray Council.

Nildottie's boundaries were created on 27 March 2003 for the "long established name" and include the sites of the Kroehns Landing Shack Site and Scrubby Flat Shack Site. On 22 December 2011, Nildottie was enlarged by the addition of land on its northern side after the locality of Greenways Landing was abolished following a request from residents and local government.

== See also ==
- Ngaut Ngaut Conservation Park
