= Sunnyside, South Australia =

Sunnyside South Australia
- Coordinates: 35.05693°S 139.36131°E
- Population: 96 (SAL 2021)
- Postcode(s): 5253
- Area: 3.88 km^{2} (1.5 sq mi) (Note: Area includes portion of Murray River in line with locality to the centre of the river.)
- LGA(s): Rural City of Murray Bridge
- State electorate(s): Hammond
- Federal division(s): Barker
Localities around Sunnyside:
Greenbanks; Willow Banks	Mypolonga	Burdett
Murrawong	Sunnyside	Burdett
Burdett	Burdett	Burdett

Sunnyside is a hamlet and semi-rural locality of Murray Bridge on the east (left) bank of the Murray River. It is adjacent to the east-bank localities of Greenbanks, Willow Banks and Murrawong on the west. The residential portion of the locality, Sunnyside Shack Site is accessible from Burdett Road, via Sunnyside Road.
