= District Council of Burra Burra =

- Local government area
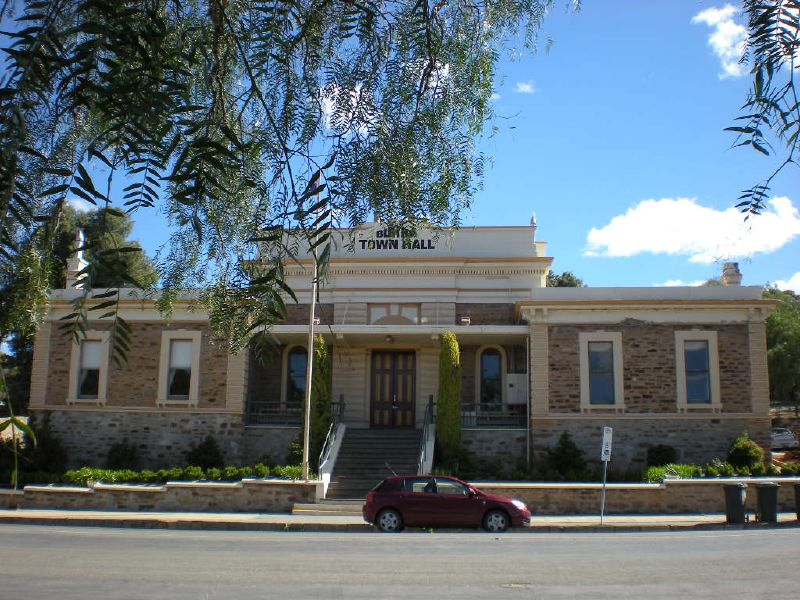
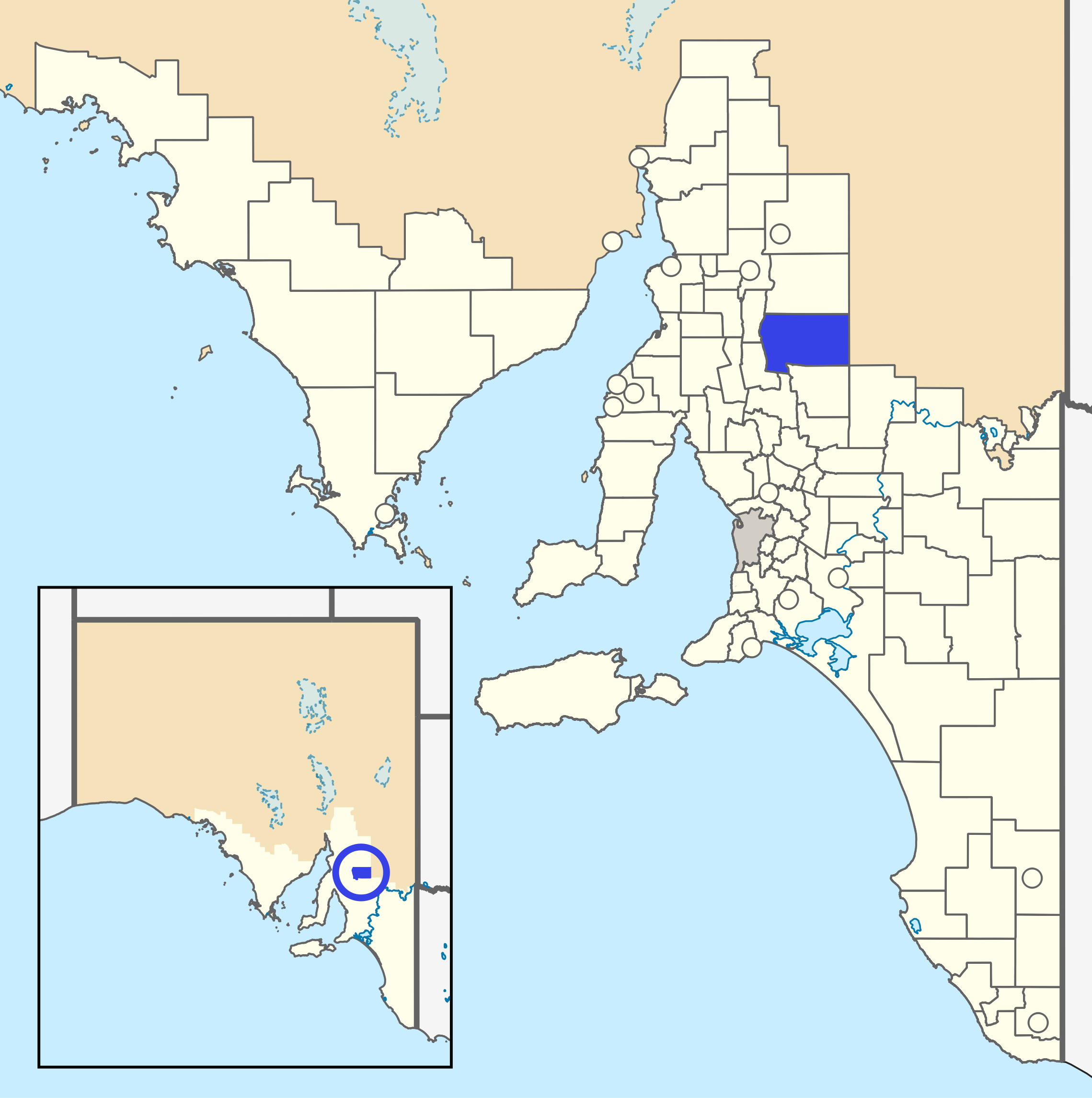
- Burra Burra council offices were within the Burra Institute building The District Council of Burra Burra as it was prior to disestablishment (blue)
- Coordinates: 33°40′0″S 138°56′0″E
- Country: Australia
- State: South Australia
- Established: 21 March 1935
- Abolished: 3 February 1997
- Council seat: Burra

Population
  - Total(s): 2,076 (1936)
LGAs around District Council of Burra Burra
Spalding	Hallett
Spalding; Clare	Burra Burra
Clare	Robertstown	Morgan

The District Council of Burra Burra was a local government area in South Australia from 1935 to 1997.

It was proclaimed on 21 March 1935, with effect from 1 May 1935, as a result of the amalgamation of the District Council of Burra, District Council of Hanson, the District Council of Mount Bryan and a substantial portion of the abolished District Council of Booborowie. It consolidated most of the Burra area - including the Hundreds of Ayers, Baldina, Hanson, King, Kingston, Kooringa, Mongolata and Rees - under one municipality, with the exception of the Corporate Town of Burra in the Burra township itself, which remained separate. The new council continued to use the offices of the former District Council of Burra, which were in the Burra Institute building.

In 1936, the principal towns were described as Aberdeen, Ayers, Booborowie, Davies, Farrell Flat, Kooringa and Mount Bryan. (Today, Aberdeen and Kooringa are now part of Burra, the Hundred of Ayers is divided between Booborowie, North Booborowie and Leighton, and Davies was renamed Hanson). It was divided into eight wards (Baldina, Booborowie, Farrell's Flat, Hanson, Kooringa, Leighton, Mongolata and Mount Bryan). The population of the district in 1936 was 2,076, living in approximately 530 dwellings. The annual revenue of the district was £3,250. In 1943, the council relocated the offices and council chamber to the former Commercial Bank building upon the bank's withdrawal from Burra. It moved again in 1980, occupying the former Farmers' Union and RSL clubrooms.

The Corporate Town of Burra, which had previously remained separate while being surrounded by the district, merged into the District Council in 1969. It continued to have the eight existing wards, but added three members to be elected from a single Burra Town Ward in the former corporate town.

It ceased to exist on 3 February 1997, when it merged with the District Council of Eudunda, the District Council of Hallett and the District Council of Robertstown to form the Regional Council of Goyder.

== Chairmen ==
- Isaac James Warnes (1935–1942)
- Harold Carter Atkins (1942–1945)
- Edward Finch (1945–1950)
- Eric Leslie McWaters (1950–1954)
- Morgan De Neufuille Lucas (1954–1957)
- Arnold David Radford (1957–1964)
- Glen Roy Finch (1964–1969)
- Roy Joseph Jeffery (1969–1973)
- William Brown (1973–1976)
- Raymond Barraclough Jennison (1976–1981)
- James Seymour Hawker (1981–?)
