= Walker Flat, South Australia =

Walker Flat South Australia
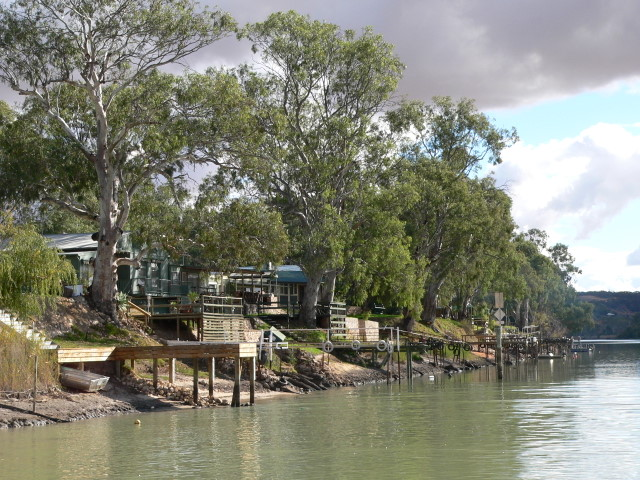
- The Walker Flat shacks and boat landings as seen from the ferry (May 2009)

- Coordinates: 34.752°S 139.556°E
- Population: 92 (SAL 2021)
- Postcode(s): 5238
- Location: 50 km (31 mi) E of Mount Pleasant
- LGA(s): Mid Murray Council
- State electorate(s): Schubert
- Federal division(s): Barker
Localities around Walker Flat:
Black Hill	Wongulla, Forster	Nildottie
	Walker Flat
Mannum	Caurnamont, Younghusband	Purnong

Walker Flat (previously Walkers Flat) is a small town on the Murray River in South Australia. It is one of the crossings of the river by cable ferry. The school opened in 1948 but has since closed. Walker Flat is located approximately 104 kilometres (65 mi) from the Adelaide city centre.

The Ankara youth camp owned by the Seventh-day Adventist Church is on the bank of the river near the ferry.

== See also ==
- List of crossings of the Murray River
