= County of Albert =

Albert
- Cadastral division
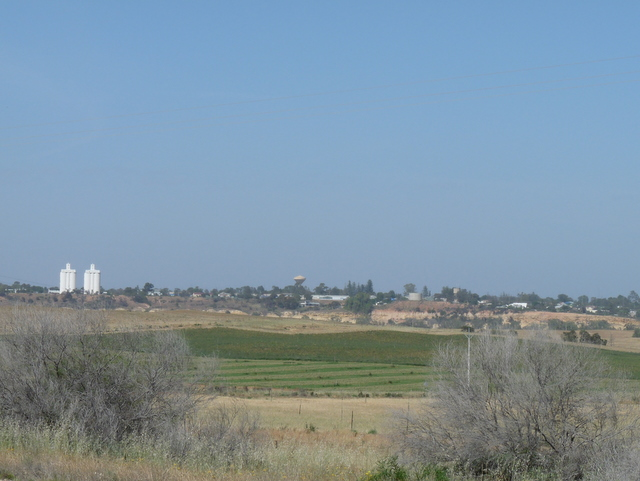
- View of Waikerie from Holder at the north of the county

- Coordinates: 34.49°S 140.00°E
- Country: Australia
- State: South Australia
- LGAs: Loxton Waikerie; Mid Murray; Karoonda East Murray
- Established: 19 April 1860

Area
  - Total: 2,194 km^{2} (847 sq mi)
Lands administrative divisions around Albert
Burra	Young	Hamley
Eyre; Sturt	Albert	Alfred
Russell	Buccleuch	Chandos

The County of Albert is one of the 49 cadastral counties of South Australia on the east banks of the River Murray. It was proclaimed by Governor Richard MacDonnell in 1860 and named for Albert, Prince Consort of Queen Victoria.

== Hundreds ==
A few years before the county was proclaimed, the Hundred of the Murray had been established to control land use immediately adjacent the river. This was abolished in 1860 and the county was proclaimed along with the five western riverside hundreds of Cadell, Randell (now Murbko), Paisley, Cooper (now Nildottie), and Giles (now Forster). Eight further hundreds were proclaimed to incorporated the entire county by 1912.

The county is presently divided into hundreds as follows:

- Along the left (east) bank of the Murray River proceeding southwards from the southward bend at Morgan are the hundreds of Cadell, Murbko, Paisley, Nildottie and Forster.
- Along the same bank of the Murray proceeding eastwards from the east boundary of the Hundred of Cadell are the hundreds of Waikerie, Holder and Moorook.
- South east of the riverlands in the Mallee region are the hundreds of Bakara, Mantung, Bandon, Chesson and Mindarie.

== Local governance ==
The promulgation of the District Councils Act 1887 in January 1888 saw the hundred of Cadell form part of the new District Council of Morgan, the hundreds of Nildottie and Paisley form part of the new District Council of Blanchetown (later called Swan Reach), and the hundred of Forster added to the District Council of Caurnamont which had been established in 1885. A decade on, in 1898, the newly gazetted hundreds of Murbko and Bakara were annexed by Blanchetown council.

In 1910 the hundred of Moorook was incorporated into the new District Council of Loxton. Then, in 1913, the hundred of Mantung, was incorporated into Blanchetown. The following year, in 1914, the District Council of Waikerie was proclaimed as comprising the hundreds of Waikerie and Holder.

In 1923 the District Council of East Murray was proclaimed as comprising the hundreds of Bandon, Chesson, Mindarie and northern portions of southerly adjacent hundreds of Wilson and McPherson in the County of Buccleuch. This brought under local governance the only remaining lands in the county without local-level government.

In 1933, the hundred of Paisley was incorporated into the District Council of Waikerie and the hundred of Nildottie was incorporated into the new District Council of Keyneton and Swan Reach (later called Sedan). In 1935, the hundred of Forster was incorporated into the new District Council of Marne.

In 1976 Marne amalgamated with Sedan bringing the hundreds of Nildottie and Forster under the local governance of the new District Council of Ridley until 1991. From 1991 to 1997 they were governed the District Council of Ridley-Truro and from 1997 by the Mid Murray Council. Three years on, in 1979, the amalgamation of East Murry and Karoonda saw the southern hundreds of Bandon, Chesson and Mindarie (as well as southern parts of Bakara and Mantung) incorporated into the new District Council of Karoonda East Murray.

== See also ==
- Lands administrative divisions of South Australia
