= District Council of Robertstown =

District Council of Robertstown South Australia
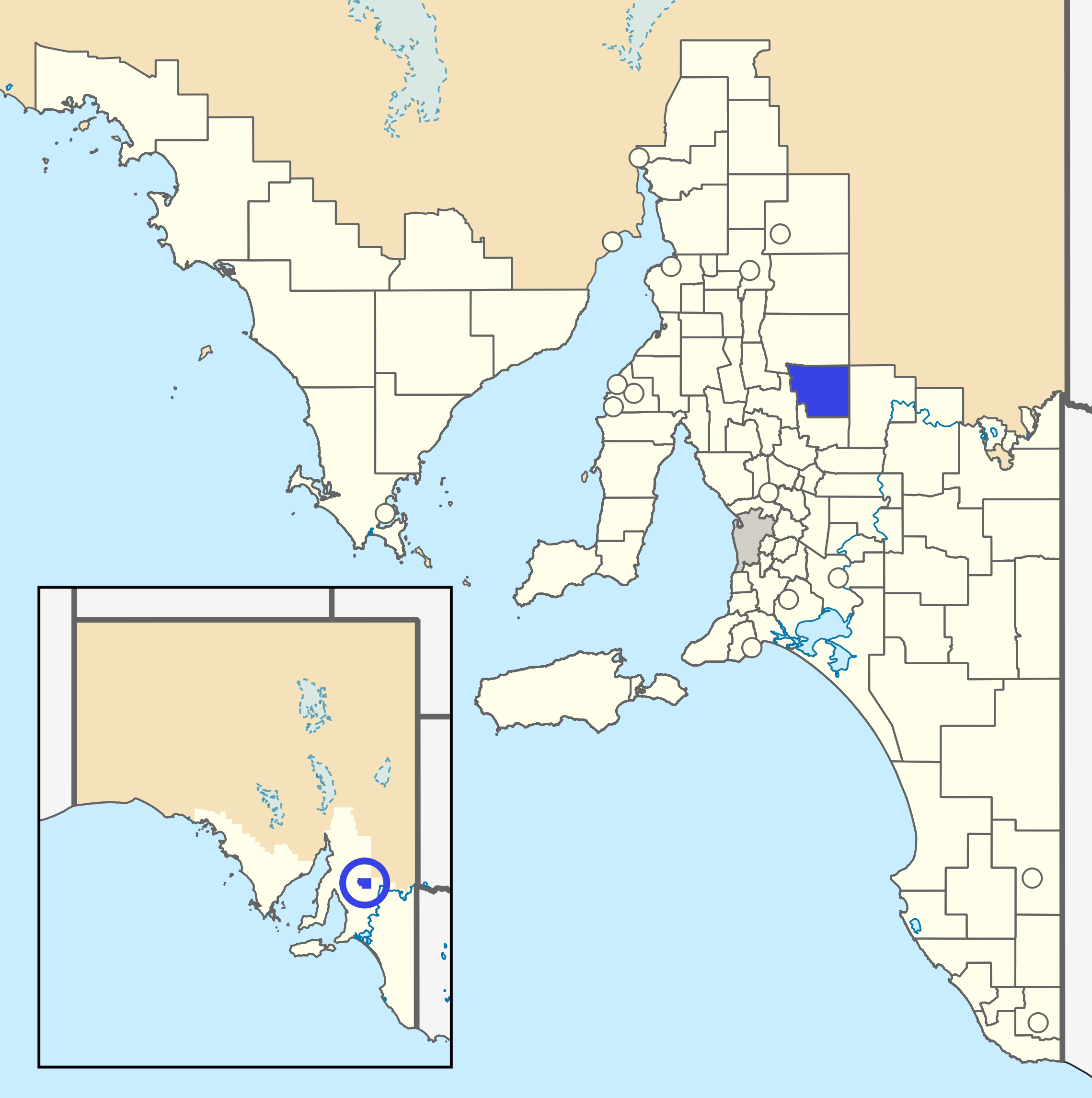
- The District Council of Robertstown as it was prior to disestablishment (blue)
- Coordinates: 34°00′0″S 139°04′0″E
- Population: 2,100 (1936)
  - Density: 1.50/km^{2} (3.88/sq mi)
- Established: 3 May 1932
- Abolished: 23 January 1997
- Area: 1,400 km^{2} (540.5 sq mi) (1936)
- Council seat: Robertstown
LGAs around District Council of Robertstown:
Burra Burra	Burra Burra
Clare	District Council of Robertstown	Morgan
Saddleworth and Auburn	Eudunda	Eudunda

The District Council of Robertstown was a local government area in South Australia from 1932 to 1997. The central town and council seat was Robertstown.

It was established on 3 May 1932 with the amalgamation of the District Council of Apoinga and the District Council of English. In 1936, it was reported to cover 550 square miles, with a population of 2,100. It comprised the cadastral hundreds of Apoinga, Bower, Bright, Bundey and English. The district's industries were described as "wheat, wool, dairy produce, magnesite, asbestos and...firewood". The council met in the Peace Hall at Robertstown. It was divided into five wards: Apoinga, Bower, Bright, English and Robertstown.

It existed until 1997, when it merged with the District Council of Burra Burra, the District Council of Eudunda and the District Council of Hallett to form the Regional Council of Goyder.

== Chairmen ==
- Johannes Alwin Heinrich (1932–1933)
- Walter Lewis Noske (1933–1954)
- Johannes Alwin Heinrich (1954–1955)
- Angus Hammond Farley (1955–1972)
- Frank Martin Mosey (1972–1982)
- Denis Brian Keller (1982–?)
