= Mypolonga, South Australia =

Mypolonga South Australia
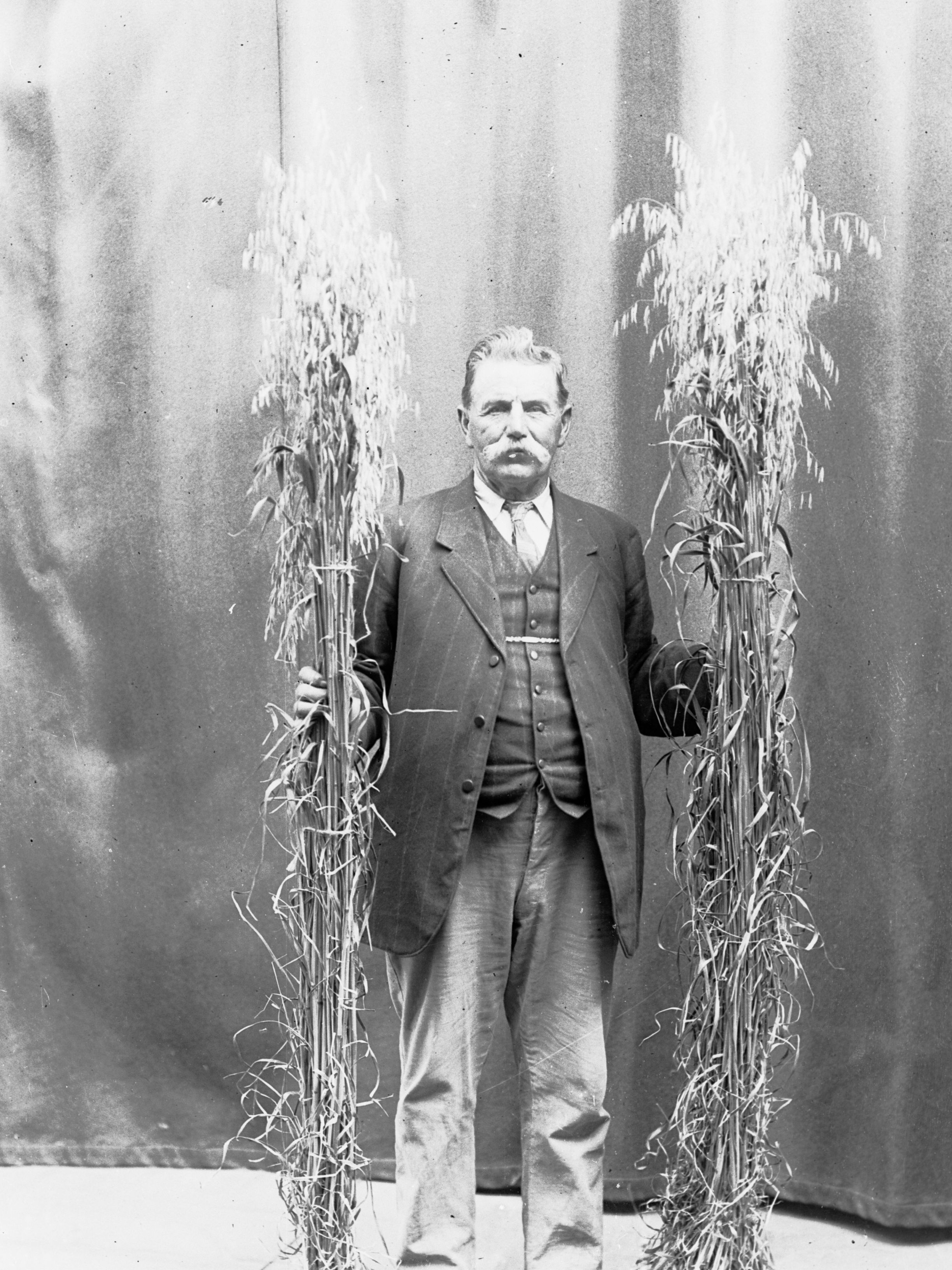
- Man holding sample of oats from Mypolonga, November 1915.

- Coordinates: 35.040°S 139.355°E
- Population: 506 (SAL 2021)
- Postcode(s): 5254
- Location: 18 km (11 mi) NE of Murray Bridge
- LGA(s): Rural City of Murray Bridge
- State electorate(s): Electoral district of Hammond
- Federal division(s): Division of Barker
Localities around Mypolonga:
Caloote, Wall Flat	Woodlane	Pompoota
Pallamana	Mypolonga	Burdett
Murray Bridge North	Willow Banks, Toora	Sunnyside

Mypolonga is a rural town in South Australia, situated on the western side of the lower Murray River, between Mannum and Murray Bridge. It has a local post office/general store, a local primary school and an Australian Rules Football team that participates in the River Murray Football League.

Mypolonga's name derives from an Aboriginal expression meaning "cliff lookout place".

The town is surrounded by limestone cliffs along the Murray River and has much agricultural land. It has been named as a finalist in the 2021 South Australian Ag Town of the Year award.

Key agriculture products include cow's milk, Jonesy's buffalo milk, stone fruit (apricots, peach, nectarine, plums etc.), citrus, wine grapes and olives.

== See also ==
- List of cities and towns in South Australia
