= District Council of Burra =

Former local government area of South Australia

Coordinates: 33°40′51″S 138°56′20″E

Seat of the former District Council of Burra in South Australia

The District Council of Burra was a local government area in South Australia from 1872 to 1935.

The council was proclaimed on 28 September 1872, comprising the whole of the cadastral Hundred of Kooringa and the southern portion of the Hundred of Kingston. It was divided into four wards at its inception: Kooringa Ward (two councillors), North Ward, Redruth Ward and South Ward (one councillor each). The proclamation appointed the first councillors: John Dunstan (North), Isaac Killicoat (Redruth), John Drew and Henry Dawson (Kooringa) and Alexander McCulloch (South). The first meeting was held on 9 December in the office of S. Drew & Co, and from December 1873 until its abolition, the council met in offices at the Burra Institute.

It had only been in existence for four years when the Corporate Town of Burra was created in 1876, severing the main township from the council. On 24 August 1876, the district and ward boundaries were realigned, with the council having three wards: Redruth and South Wards (two councillors) and Kooringa Ward (one councillor). It underwent another alteration under the District Councils Act 1887, which added the Hundreds of Baldina and King from 5 January 1888. It retained the 1888 wards, Kooringa Ward (three councillors), Baldina Ward (two councillors) and King Ward (two councillors), for the remainder of its existence.

It ceased to exist on 21 March 1935, when it merged with the District Council of Hanson, the District Council of Mount Bryan and part of the abolished District Council of Booborowie to form the District Council of Burra Burra following a Local Government Commission report aimed at reducing the number of municipalities in the state.

== Chairmen of the District Council of Burra ==
- Isaac Killicoat (1872)
- Thomas Warnes (1877)
- N. F. Pearse (1921–1935)
