= Claypans, South Australia =

Claypans South Australia
- Coordinates: 34.8228°S 139.7132°E
- Population: 4 (SAL 2021)
- Postcode(s): 5238
- Location: 10 km (6 mi) NE of Purnong
- LGA(s): Mid Murray Council
- State electorate(s): Chaffey
- Federal division(s): Barker
Localities around Claypans:
	Nildottie
Purnong	Claypans	Copeville
	Bowhill	Perponda

Claypans is a locality in the Murray Mallee region of South Australia. Claypans had a Methodist church in 1928. The school opened in 1907 and closed in 1947. The name refers to the claypan at which the settlers camped on their first night.
