= District Council of Booborowie =

Coordinates: 33°33′46″S 138°45′45″E

The District Council of Booborowie was a local government area in South Australia from 1875 to 1935.

It was proclaimed on 6 May 1875, following strong support at a public meeting the previous year. It initially comprised the cadastral Hundred of Ayers (modern Booborowie, North Booborowie and parts of Burra and Leighton). It would later also gain the Hundred of Anne (modern Canowie, Willalo and parts of Hallett) to the north of the existing council, under the District Councils Act 1887. The council initially met in the Booborowie eating house and Cobb and Co coach stopover prior to the construction of the Booborowie Council Chambers, on Main Road, Booborowie, in 1888-1889. The former council chambers survive today and are listed on the South Australian Heritage Register.

The council was abolished in 1935 following sweeping Local Government Commission recommendations that proposed cutting the number of municipalities in South Australia from 196 to 142. The initial report recommended annexing a section of both the Ayers and Anne wards to the District Council of Hallett as its Willalo Ward, annexing the remainder of Anne Ward to the District Council of Terowie, and amalgamating the remaining portions of the Booborowie council with the District Council of Burra, the District Council of Hanson and the District Council of Mount Bryan to form the District Council of Burra Burra. However, as the final process also resulted in the abolition of the Terowie council, which was wholly merged into Hallett, Booborowie was divided only between the Hallett and new Burra Burra councils, ceasing to exist from 1 May 1935. The amalgamation had been strongly opposed by the sitting council, who had argued they were large enough to stand alone.

== Chairmen ==
- A. D. McDonald (1917)
- W. J. Cousins (1929)
