= District Council of Neales =

Coordinates: 34°10′00″S 139°05′00″E

The District Council of Neales was a local government area in South Australia from 1878 to 1932. The main town and council seat was Eudunda.

The council was proclaimed on 15 August 1878, comprising the cadastral Hundred of Neales. The first meeting was held at the Eudunda Hotel on 29 August. It was initially divided into four wards: Dutton, Eudunda, North and South. Ratepayers in the Hundred of Brownlow in the District Council of Morgan had advocated to be included in the Neales council from the early 1890s, and this was successful on 30 July 1904, when it was severed from Morgan and attached to the District Council of Neales as its new fifth ward.

The early business of the council has been described as an "almost entire preoccupation with clearing land". It initially rented the "White Iron House", owned by J. Hannon, for use as a council office, and from 1886 rented a room in the Eudunda Hotel. In 1916, the council purchased the Century Hall at Eudunda from the Eudunda Unterhaltungs Club, renaming it the District Hall; they were based out of the hall for the remainder of their existence. It was renovated and extended in 1925 at a cost of more than £2,000.

In 1923, it had an area of 100 square miles, with a population of 1,950, including 485 ratepayers. The capital value of ratable property in the district in that year was £363,560. The revenue of the council in 1924 was £3,100, having increased from £1,090 in 1894.

It ceased to exist on 12 May 1932 when, as part of broad local government amalgamations in South Australia, it merged with the District Council of Julia to form the District Council of Eudunda.

== Chairmen ==
- John Hunter (1878)
- Ernest Carl Pfitzner (1878–1880)
- F. G. Sieber (1891)
- J. Gosden (1892)
- C. T. Nicholls (1909)
