= Burdett, South Australia =

Burdett South Australia
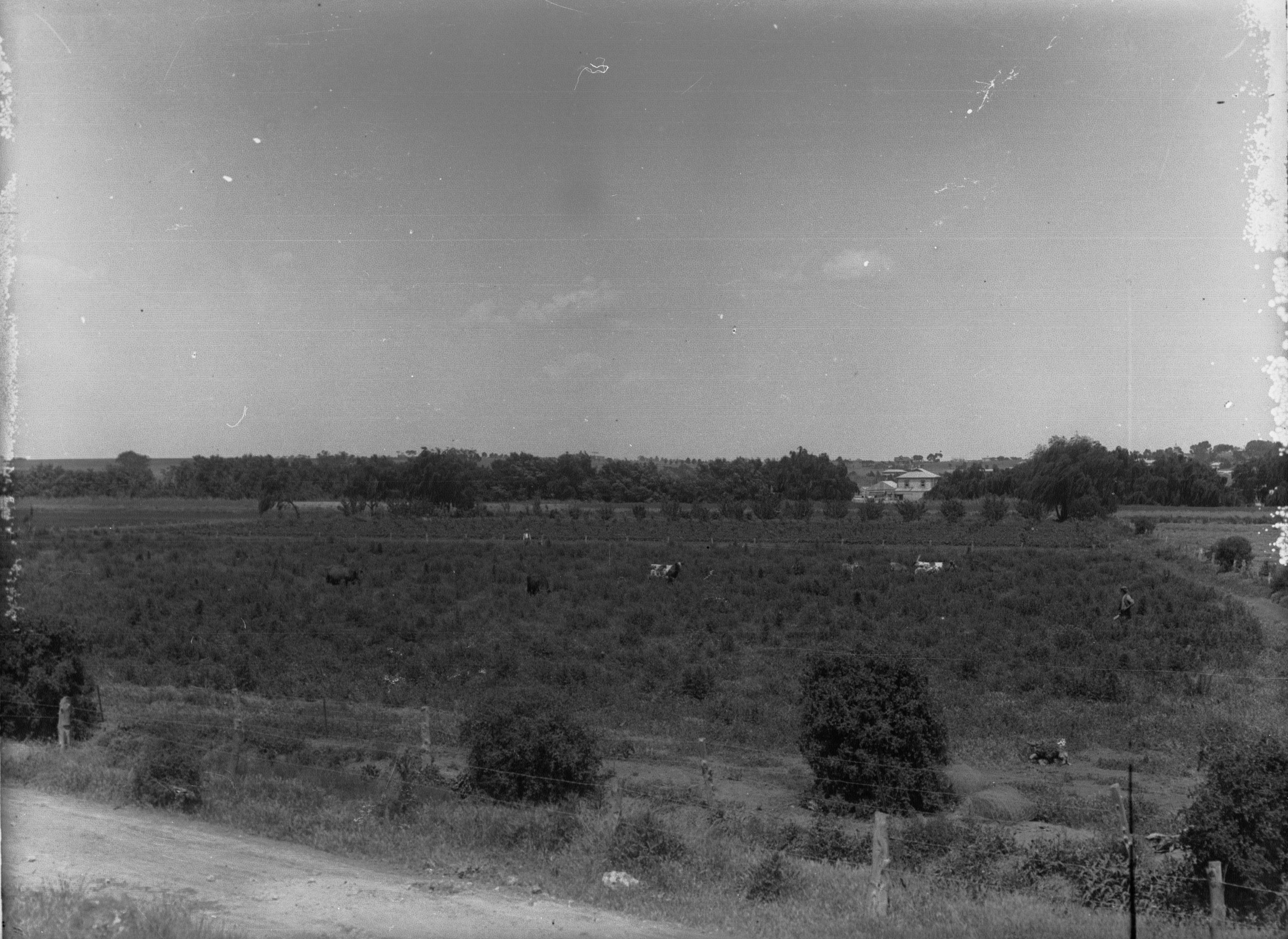
- Farm at Burdett, 1917

- Coordinates: 35.077630°S 139.399940°E
- Population: 234 (SAL 2021)
- Established: prior to 2000
- Postcode(s): 5253
- Time zone: ACST (UTC+9:30)
  - Summer (DST): ACST (UTC+10:30)
- Location: 74 km (46 mi) ESE of Adelaide city centre; 3.5 km (2 mi) East of Murray Bridge
- LGA(s): Mid Murray Council; Rural City of Murray Bridge
- State electorate(s): Hammond
- Federal division(s): Barker
Localities around Burdett:
Cowirra, Ponde	Younghusband	Younghusband
Pompoota, Mypolonga, Sunnyside, Willow Banks, Murrawong, Toora	Burdett	Ettrick, Chapman Bore
Avoca Dell, Murray Bridge East	Kepa	Kepa

Burdett is a locality in South Australia located on the eastern side (left bank) of the Murray River about 3.5 kilometres (2.2 miles) to the east of the city of Murray Bridge and about 74 kilometres (46 miles) east south-east of the Adelaide city centre. Its name is derived from the Hundred of Burdett.

While the name has been "long established," Burdett's current boundaries were established in 2000. The land within Burdett is used for agricultural purposes with the exception of the Australian Army field training area, the Murray Bridge Training Area, which occupies about 42 square kilometres (16 square miles) of land at the locality's southern boundary. The Karoonda Highway passes through the locality on its way to Loxton. Burdett is located within the federal Division of Barker, the electoral district of Hammond and the local government areas of the Mid Murray Council and the Rural City of Murray Bridge.

== See also ==
- List of cities and towns in South Australia
