= District Council of Hanson =

Coordinates: 33°49′51″S 138°47′48″E

Seat of the former District Council of Hanson in South Australia

The District Council of Hanson was a local government area in South Australia from 1878 to 1935.

The council was proclaimed on 8 August 1872, comprising the whole of the cadastral Hundred of Hanson. Its foundation was controversial: it had reportedly been supported by 40 farmers representing 13,000 acres and opposed by 48 farmers representing "about the same quantity of land", in addition to two large landholders representing 33,000 acres. The opponents of the council claimed that the proponents were mostly within the government town of Hanson (now Farrell Flat), and that most of the proposed district did not share a common interest with the town. However, those who supported the council were successful when the government decided to "extend the advantages of self-government" and recommended its proclamation. There was further controversy later in the year when the government appointed an opponent as a councillor to replace a supporter who had been disqualified.

The council was divided into five wards in November 1873: Eastern Ward, Gum Creek Ward, Hanson Ward, Western Ward and North-Eastern Ward. Gum Creek Ward and Western Ward were amalgamated into a Middle Ward in 1879, while the North-Eastern Ward became the North Ward during the 1870s and was later abolished.

A tender for a council chamber for the new council was accepted in 1874 at the "Torreston" subdivision at what is now Farrell Flat. This first chamber was vacated in 1878 and leased to the Education Department for school purposes, while the council selected a site for a new chamber and began construction later that year. In 1923, the council was meeting "for the matter of convenience" at Kooringa in Burra.

In 1923, it was described as a "small agricultural district" with an area of 77,440 acres, with the capital value of ratable property being £329,940. It had a population of 641 persons, residing in 148 dwellings, at the 1921 census.

The Hanson council ceased to exist on 21 March 1935, when it was amalgamated with the District Council of Burra, the District Council of Mount Bryan, and part of the District Council of Booborowie to form the District Council of Burra Burra, following a Local Government Commission report aimed at reducing the number of municipalities in the state.

== Chairmen ==
- P. Tohl (1880)
- J. H. Rogers (1917-1918)
- H. C. Atkins (1931)
