= District Council of Apoinga =

Former local government area of South Australia

Coordinates: 33°50′17″S 138°58′17″E

Seat of the former District Council of Apoinga in South Australia

The District Council of Apoinga was a local government area in South Australia from 1873 to 1932.

The council was proclaimed on 6 November 1873. It opened council chambers at Logan Gap on 23 September 1876, at a cost of £78/10-. The main business of the council in its early years was "the construction and maintenance of roads, and the depasturing of sheep and cattle on reserves", with rabbit control also being important. The council became responsible for the Apoinga Cemetery in February 1880. It gained the Hundreds of Bright and Bundey under the District Councils Act 1887, and was divided by May 1888 into three wards: Apoinga (three councillors), and Bright and Bundey (two councillors each).

It merged with the District Council of English to create the District Council of Robertstown on 16 May 1932, one of a number of municipalities to amalgamate following a report by the Local Government Commission. It had been strongly opposed by most of the Apoinga council, who had attempted to protest to both the responsible minister and the commission. The three Apoinga wards were transferred across to the new council, while the last chairman of Apoinga, J. A. Heinrich, became chairman of the new council.

The State Library of South Australia holds a photograph of the Apoinga council building from 1978, partially ruined. A plaque at the Robertstown Community Centre commemorates the oversubscription of the Apoinga council to the Commonwealth Peace Loan following World War I.

== Chairmen ==
Name	Years in office	References
J. Humphreys	1878	
T. McWaters	1893–1894	
W. G. Hawkes	1894–1910	
T. Sandland	1910–1916	
W. G. Hawkes	1916–1930	
J. A. Heinrich	1930–1932	
