= District Council of Mount Bryan =

Coordinates: 33°33′02″S 138°53′36″E

The District Council of Mount Bryan was a local government area in South Australia from 1874 to 1935.

It was established on 29 October 1874, when it was detached from the District Council of Burra. It gained the Hundred of Mongolata and the Hundred of Rees under the District Councils Act 1887. In 1896, a ratepayers meeting supported dividing the council into two, arguing that the council was financially unviable on the existing boundaries; however, this did not occur. The council chambers were located in Mount Bryan.

The council merged with the District Council of Burra, the District Council of Hanson and most of the District Council of Booborowie to form the District Council of Burra Burra on 21 March 1935.

== Chairmen ==
- Richard Collins (1883)
- H. Bowman (1896)
- H. S. Stephens (1910)
- Isaac James Warnes (for many years)
