= District Council of Mannum =

Defunct council in Australia

Coordinates: 34°54′49″S 139°18′21″E

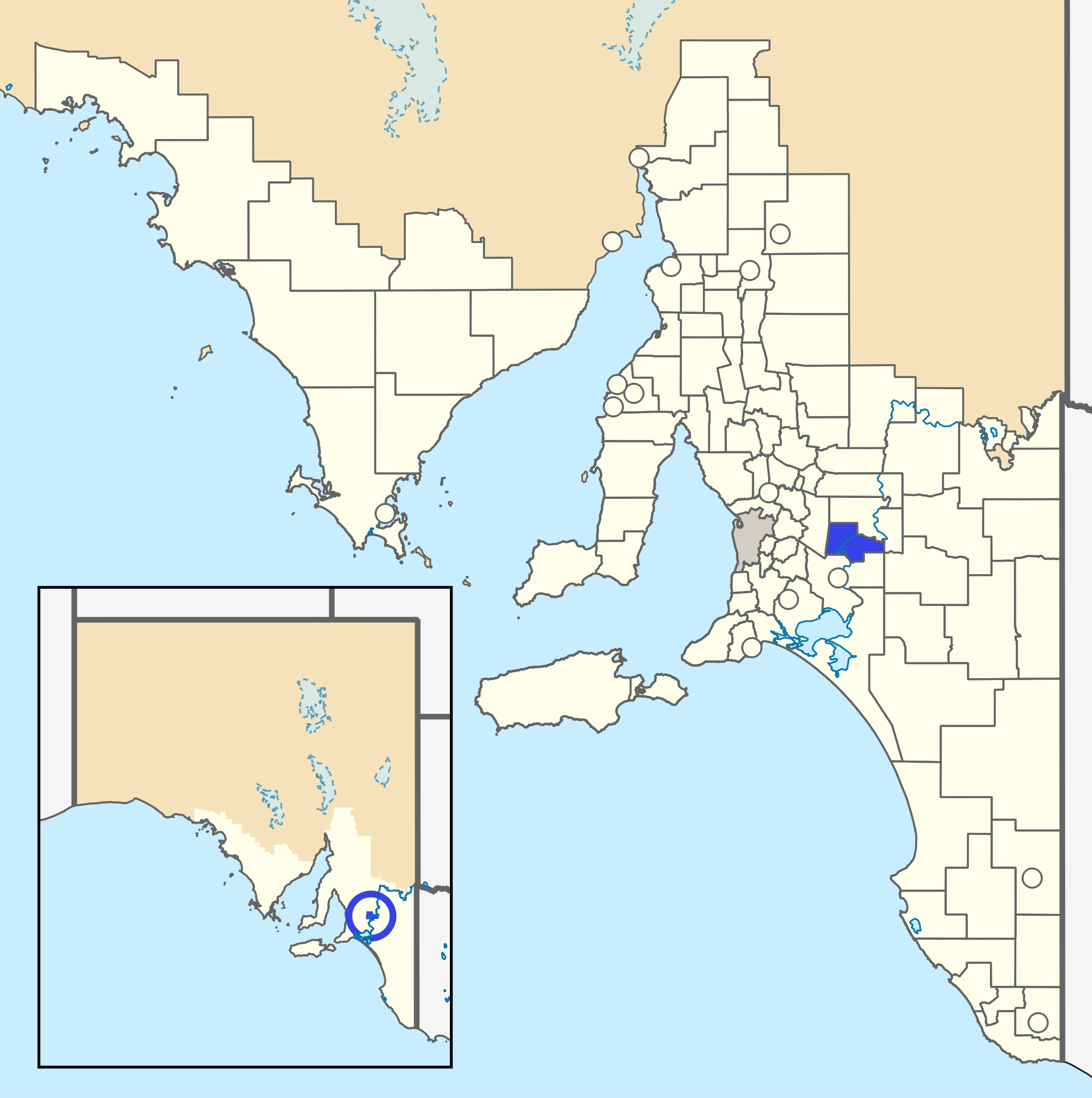
The District Council of Mannum as it was prior to disestablishment (blue)

The District Council of Mannum was a local government area in South Australia from 1877 to 1997, centring on the town of Mannum.

It was proclaimed on 23 August 1877, comprising the cadastral Hundred of Finniss, "situated between the eastern fringe of the Mount Lofty Ranges and the Murray River." The first meeting of the council was held on 1 September 1877 at the Bogan Hotel (now the Mannum Hotel). It had 120 ratepayers in its first year, with a ratable property value of £2,910. In the early 1880s, the council area had a population of 773. It expanded in January 1888 under the District Councils Act 1887, gaining the Hundred of Younghusband on the eastern bank of the Murray River; it also gained the northern section of the adjacent Hundred of Burdett in the same year. The council was unsubdivided until 1888, when it was divided into wards for the first time: the West, North and Central Wards (for Finniss) had two councillors each, while the South and East (for Younghusband and Burdett) had one each. A council chamber was built in 1896. There were two subsequent changes to the ward system: in 1900, when Central Ward was narrowed to only the township of Mannum, and again in 1956, when it gained an extra councillor, taking the council to a total of nine members.

In 1923, it covered an area of 176 square miles, with a capital value of over £24,000. The council lost two areas in 1935: one which amalgamated with the District Council of Springton to form the District Council of Mount Pleasant, and another which was severed to join the District Council of Mobilong. The council operated the Mannum ferry from March 1888 to June 1976. It was heavily involved in measures to deal with flooding on a number of occasions, and operated special boat services during the 1956 Murray River flood while the ferries were out of operation. In the second half of the twentieth century, it also developed a caravan park, recreation reserve, community centre and dental clinic at Mannum.

In 1986, it covered an area of 681 square kilometres. The main primary industries were described as cereal growing (wheat and barley) and sheep farming for both meat and wool, with piggeries and cattle farming also of note. Agricultural machinery manufacturer Horwood Bagshaw (formerly David Shearer Limited) was the largest employer in the district. It was "one of the most popular places in the state" for tourist visits in that year due to the Murray River, with $2.7 million having been spent by tourists in 1981-1982.

It ceased to exist on 1 July 1997, when it amalgamated with the District Council of Morgan, the District Council of Ridley-Truro, and part of the District Council of Mount Pleasant to form the Mid Murray Council.

== Chairmen of the District Council of Mannum ==
- J. W. Walker (1877)
- F. W. Busch (1911)
- Alfred George Bolto (1918-1923, 1924-1926, 1930-1938)
- Hermann Berthold Scheer (1938-1947)
- Frank Ormsby Clindening (1947-1951)
- Sidney Alfred Bretag (1951-1953)
- Frank Ormsby Clindening (1953-1955)
- Sidney Alfred Bretag (1955-1962)
- Norman William Male (1962-1963)
- Carl Richard Maczkowiak (1963-1964)
- Clifford James Baseby (1964-1967)
- Ernest Richard Castle (1967-1970)
- Anthony Aiden Kenny (1970-1971)
- Ernest Richard Castle (1971-1972)
- Anthony Aiden Kenny (1972-1976)
- Avon Harold Rosenzweig (1976-1991)
