= Willow Banks, South Australia =

Willow Banks
- Town
- Coordinates: 35.05559°S 139.34531°E
- Country: Australia
- State: South Australia
- LGA: Rural City of Murray Bridge

Government
  - State electorate: Hammond
  - Federal division: Barker

Area (Note: Area includes portion of Murray River in line with locality to the centre of the river.)
  - Total: 0.19 km^{2} (0.073 sq mi)
- Postcode: 5253
Localities around Willow Banks
Mypolonga	Mypolonga	Mypolonga
Murrawong	Willow Banks	Greenbanks
Murrawong	Sunnyside	Sunnyside

Willow Banks is a hamlet and semi-rural locality of Murray Bridge on the east (left) bank of the Murray River. It is adjacent to the east-bank localities of Murrawong, on the west, and Sunnyside and Greenbanks on the east. Willowbanks Way is the only road within the locality, and is accessible only via Aroona Road, Sunnyside.
