= District Council of Terowie =

Former local government area in South Australia

Coordinates: 33°09′0″S 138°55′0″E

Seat of the former District Council of Terowie in South Australia

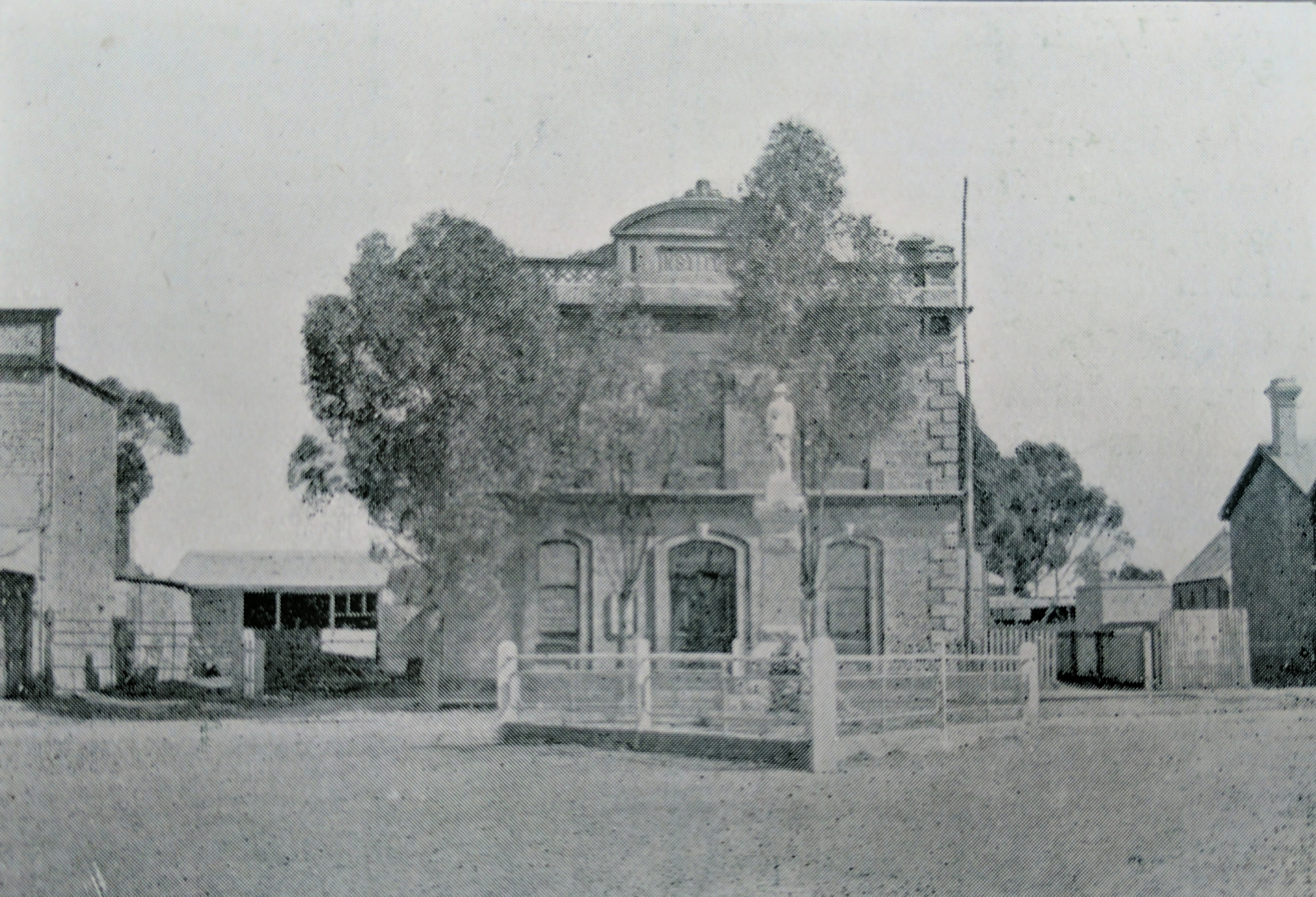
Terowie Institute and Council Chamber

The District Council of Terowie was a local government area in South Australia from 1888 to 1935, centring on the town of Terowie.

It was established by the District Councils Act 1887, which took effect from 5 January 1888. The creation of the council followed resident advocacy for the creation of a local government in Terowie in 1887. The council comprised the cadastral Hundreds of Ketchowla, Terowie and Wonna at its creation. The council rented offices in the Terowie Institute building from 1888 to 1890 before purchasing an Anglican church which the congregation had outgrown; the former church was used as council chambers for the remainder of the council's existence. It gained a portion of the Hundred of Whyte in 1899, resulting in an increase from three to four numbered wards. The council's public works included roadworks throughout the district and kerbing, footpaths, stormwater drainage and tree planting in Terowie township, with more limited works in Yarcowie.

In 1923, the council was responsible for an area of 475 square miles, with a population of 1,300 residing in 300 dwellings. The capital value of ratable property was reported as £406,619. In that year, the only other "township of any importance" besides Terowie was reported to be Yarcowie. The council ceased to exist on 1 May 1935 when it was amalgamated into the adjacent District Council of Hallett following a Local Government Commission report into reducing the number of municipalities in the state. The complex amalgamation saw it almost simultaneously gain part of the abolished District Council of Booborowie and then, on its new boundaries, merge into the Hallett council. The amalgamation had been strongly opposed by the Terowie council.

== Chairmen ==
- E. Stephenson (1894)
- John Newland (1903-1904)
- T. J. Hosking (1910-1911)
- W. D. Roach (1912-1913, 1916-1917, 1921-1922)
- Frank Lock (1927)
- A. J. Molony (1935)
