= District Council of Hallett =

Government in South Australia from 1877 to 1997

Coordinates: 33°24′00″S 138°53′00″E

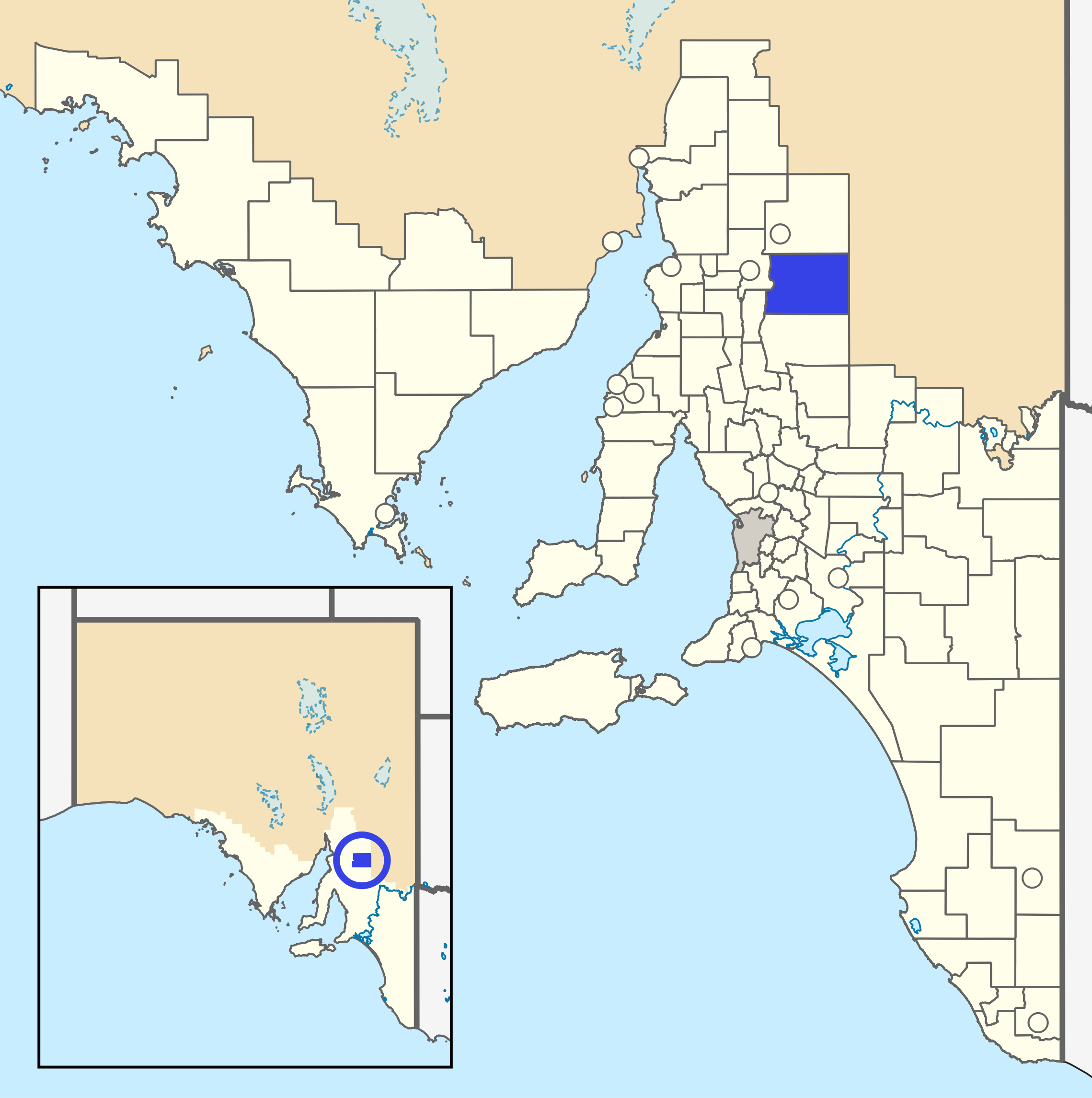
The District Council of Hallett as it was prior to disestablishment (blue)

The District Council of Hallett was a local government area in South Australia from 1877 to 1997.

The council was proclaimed on 13 September 1877 representing the Hundred of Hallett, establishing a council of eight members divided into four wards (Willogoleech, Cartarpo, Ulooloo and Banbury). The first meeting was held at Mann's Hotel at Hallett on 24 September. It was expanded by the District Councils Act 1887 to include the Hundred of Tomkinson and portions of the Hundred of Hallett excluded in the initial proclamation.

The council voted in 1928 to establish a replacement council chamber in the new Hallett Institute building at a cost of £500.

It absorbed the neighbouring District Council of Terowie on 1 May 1935. On 21 May 1935, it gained a portion of the Anne and Ayers wards of the abolished District Council of Booborowie, which formed the new Willalo Ward; it also added the Cappeedee Ward at this time. The changes resulted in a seven-ward system from 1935, with one councillor from each of the Banbury, Cappeedee, Hallett, Terowie, Terowie Township, Whyte and Willalo Wards.

In 1936, it was reported to cover an area of 300 square miles, with 484 residents, 150 of them ratepayers.

It existed until 23 January 1997, when it merged with the District Council of Burra Burra, the District Council of Eudunda, and the District Council of Robertstown to create the Regional Council of Goyder.

== Chairmen ==
- Richard Collins (1877–1878)
- John Brayley (1878–1879)
- John Dunstan (1879–1880)
- J. Thomas (1880–1882)
- J. H. Tiver (1882)
- John Brayley (1882–1883)
- Thomas Wilks (1883)
- J. Stephens (1883–1884)
- J. H. Tiver (1884–1888)
- Thomas Wilks (1888–1890)
- A. J. Lewis (1890–1894)
- Sir John Melrose (1894–1902)
- C. W. Bowman (1902–1914)
- T. E. Richards (1914–1933)
- Cornelius Wesley Gare (1933–1940)
- Walter Scott Murray (1940–1944)
- William George Miller (1944–1951)
- Noel Goss Tiver (1952–1955)
- Lewis Wesley Pinch Gare (1955–1967)
- Eric Johnston Ashby (1967–1981)
