= District Council of Eudunda =

- Local government area
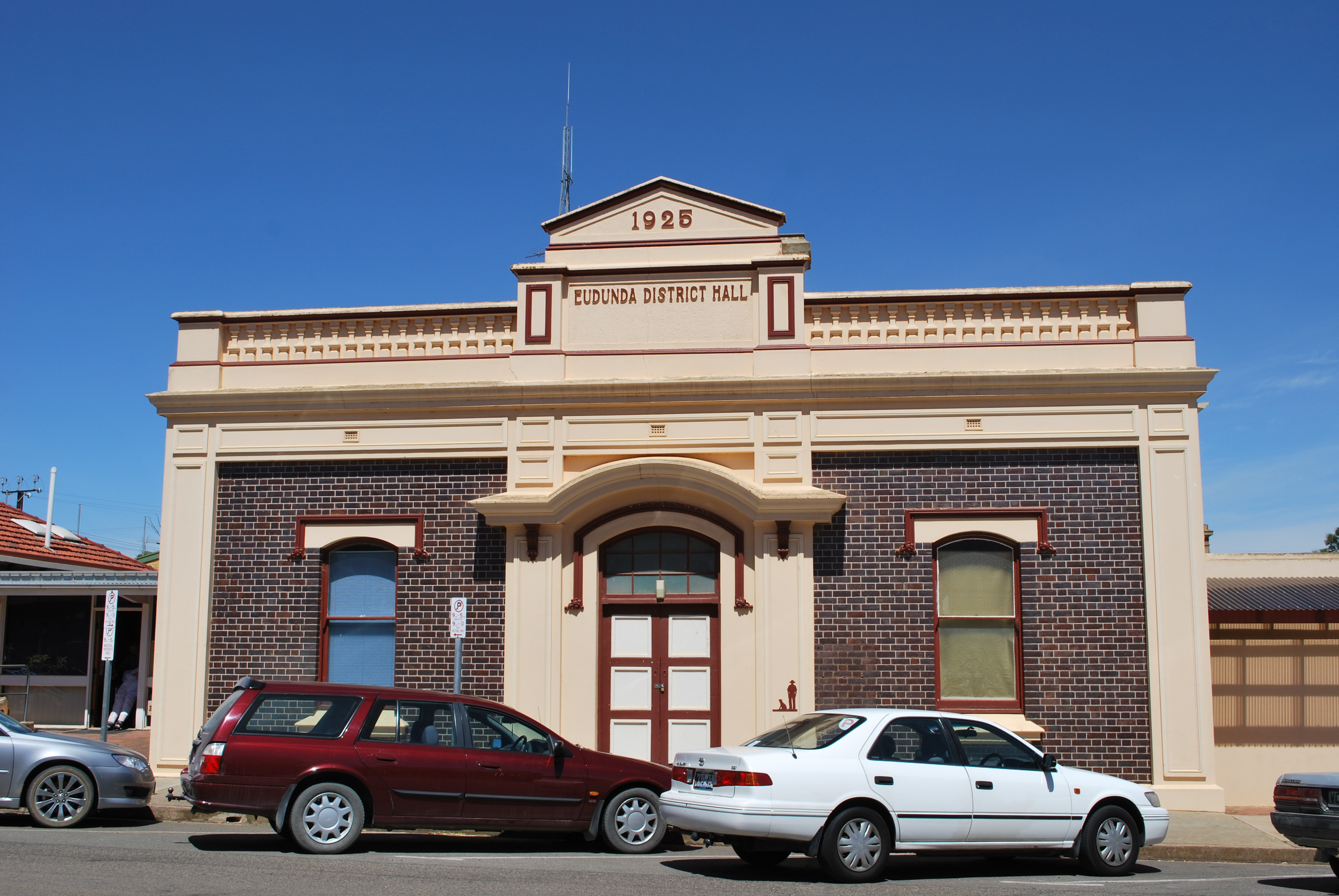
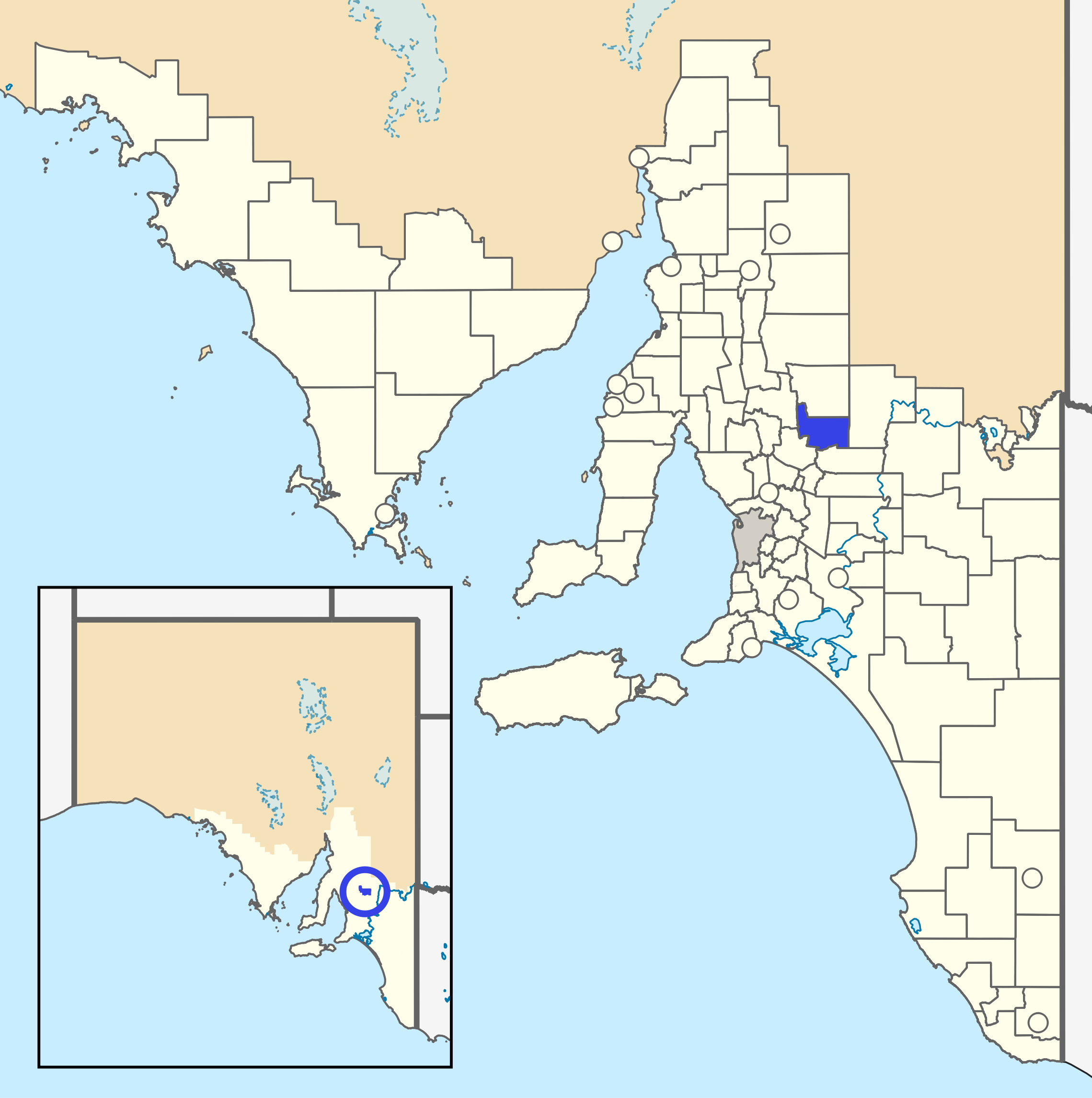
- Eudunda District Hall, pictured in 2010, housed council meetings until 1963 The District Council of Eudunda as it was prior to disestablishment (blue)
- Coordinates: 34°10′0″S 139°05′0″E
- Country: Australia
- State: South Australia
- Established: 12 May 1932
- Abolished: 23 January 1997
- Council seat: Eudunda
LGAs around District Council of Eudunda
Riverton	Robertstown	Morgan
Riverton	District Council of Eudunda	Morgan
Kapunda	Kapunda; Truro; Ridley-Truro	Truro; Ridley-Truro

The District Council of Eudunda was a local government area in South Australia from 1932 to 1997. The central town and council seat was Eudunda. It was established on 12 May 1932 with the amalgamation of the District Council of Julia and the District Council of Neales. By 1936, it was divided up into four wards: Brownlow, Eudunda and Neales (two councillors each) and Julia (three councillors). It met at the District Hall at Eudunda, which had formerly been owned by the Neales council, until 1963. The council existed until 1997, when it amalgamated with the District Council of Burra Burra, the District Council of Hallett and the District Council of Robertstown to form the Regional Council of Goyder.

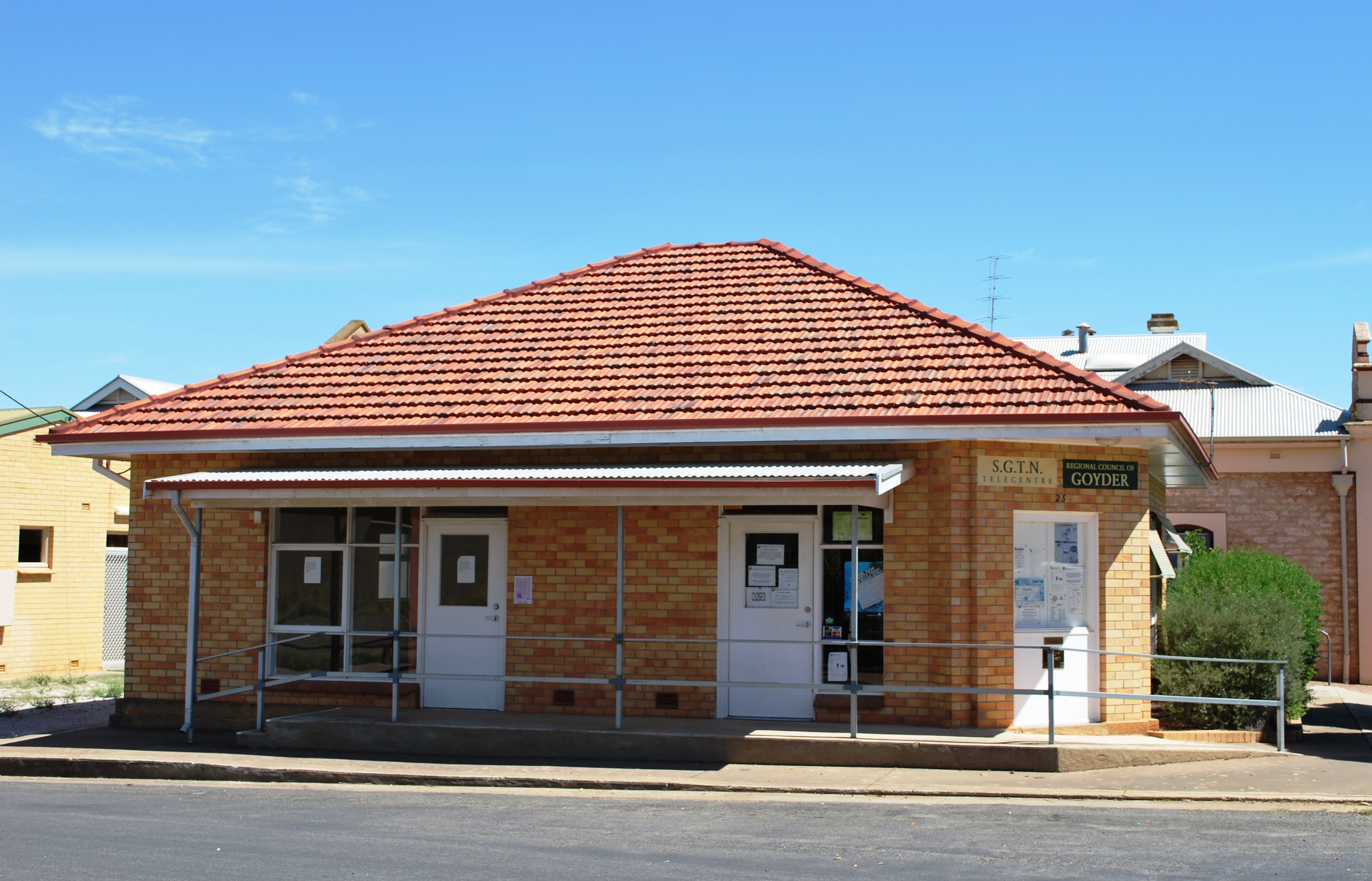
Eudunda council building as used by the Regional Council of Goyder in 2010

== Chairmen ==
- A. G. Wiesner (1932–1933)
- Herbert Michael (1933–1941)
- Clarence Albert Mann (1941–1947)
- Hermann Oskar Leditschke (1947–1950)
- Leslie Nicholson (1950–1951)
- George Hambour (1951–1957)
- George Carl Pfitzner (1957–1966)
- Hedley Gordon Hambour (1966–1972)
- Walter Theodor Hage (1972–1973)
- Ralph Ewens Carter (1973–1985)
- Frank Martin Mosey (1985–?)
