= Forster, South Australia =

Locality in South Australia

Forster South Australia
- Coordinates: 34.73°S 139.56°E
- Population: 14 (SAL 2016)
- Postcode(s): 5238
- Location: 105 km (65 mi) east of Adelaide
- LGA(s): Mid Murray Council
- State electorate(s): Chaffey
- Federal division(s): Barker
Localities around Forster:
Wongulla
	Forster	Nildottie
Walker Flat

Forster is a locality in the Murraylands region of South Australia. It lies on the inside of a bend on the east/left bank of the Murray River north of Walker Flat.

Forster previously had a Methodist Church in the locality. Reverend Clem Hawke (later father of Prime Minister Bob Hawke) was Methodist home missionary there in 1919. It also had a Lutheran Church. The original church building built in 1904 was burnt down in 1920 and replaced in 1921.
