= Purnong, South Australia =

Purnong South Australia
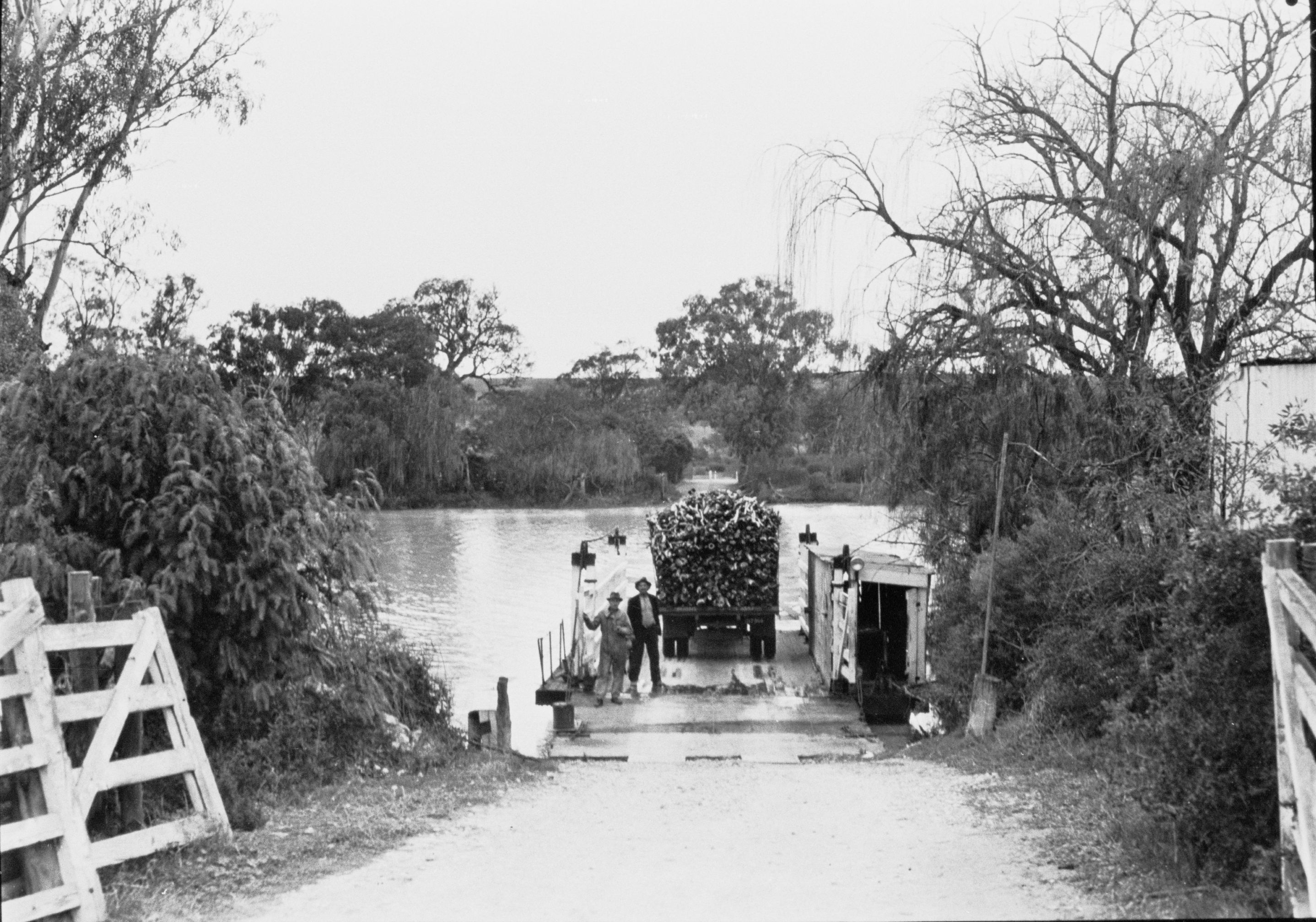
- Purnong ferry

- Coordinates: 34.8542°S 139.6237°E
- Population: 55 (SAL 2021)
- Postcode(s): 5238
- Location: 115 km (71 mi) E of Adelaide; 32 km (20 mi) NE of Mannum
- LGA(s): Mid Murray Council
- State electorate(s): Chaffey
- Federal division(s): Barker
Localities around Purnong:
Walker Flat	Forster	Nildottie
Caurnamont	Purnong	Claypans
	Bowhill

Purnong or Purnong Landing is the location of a cable ferry across the Murray River upstream of Mannum. The town is on the cliffs above the left (eastern) bank of the river. It is 32 kilometres (20 mi) by road from Mannum on the west side of the Murray, and 40 kilometres (25 mi) on the east side.

The town was surveyed in 1911 and named for an Aboriginal word meaning at the wide place. The ferry crossing is the shortest in South Australia, but there are lagoons adjacent to the river.

Purnong Primary School closed in December 1983.

== See also ==
- List of crossings of the Murray River
