= Hundred of Ridley =

Coordinates: 34.743°S 139.491°E

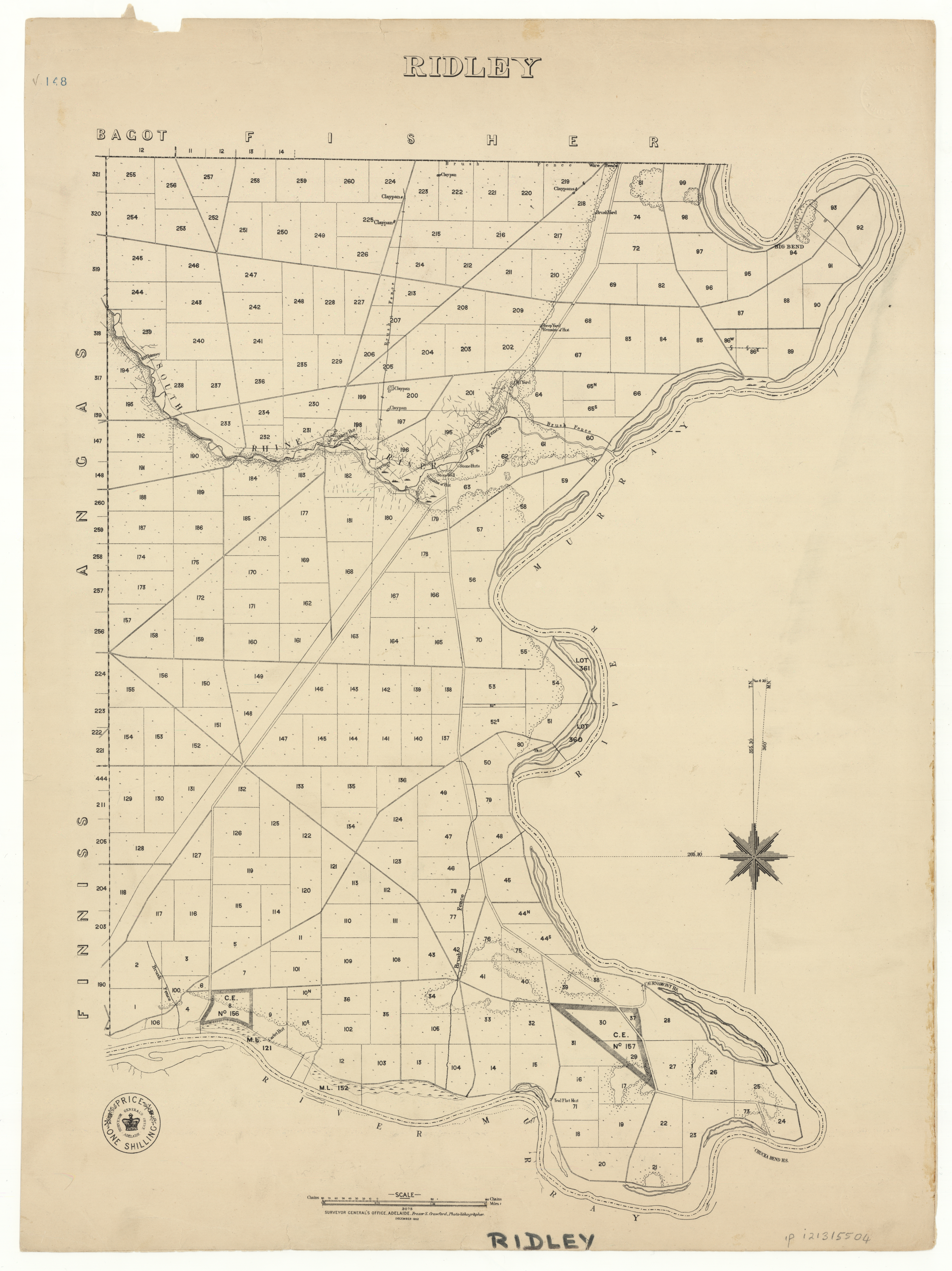
File:Hundred of Ridley, 1882

The Hundred of Ridley is a cadastral hundred in the County of Russell in South Australia. It was proclaimed on 19 April 1860 and included a portion of the former Hundred of the Murray.
