= Bowhill, South Australia =

Bowhill South Australia
- Coordinates: 35°01′10″S 139°41′41″E
- Population: 127 (SAL 2021)
- Established: 11 November 1999 (locality)
- Postcode(s): 5238
- Time zone: ACST (UTC+9:30)
  - Summer (DST): ACDT (UTC+10:30)
- LGA(s): Mid Murray Council; District Council of Karoonda East Murray
- Region: Murray and Mallee
- County: Buccleuch; Russell
- State electorate(s): Hammond
- Federal division(s): Barker
Mean max temp	Mean min temp	Annual rainfall
23.6 °C; 74 °F	9.3 °C; 49 °F	343.0 mm 13.5 in
Suburbs around Bowhill:
Caurnamont	Purnong; Claypans	Claypans
Caurnamont; Younghusband; Ettrick	Bowhill	Perponda; Karoonda
Ettrick	Wynarka	Karoonda
- Footnotes: Adjoining localities

Bowhill is a locality in South Australia. A settlement is located inside a bend on the left (eastern/southern) bank of the Murray River between Mannum and Swan Reach. It is predominantly shacks built facing the river bank. The settlement is in the Mid Murray Council area, but most of the locality is located away from the river and within the District Council of Karoonda East Murray, including the Lowan Conservation Park.

Bowhill is located in the local government area of District Council of Karoonda East Murray, the state electoral district of Hammond and the federal Division of Barker.

The nearest crossings of the Murray River are the Mannum ferry 30 kilometres (19 mi) downstream and the Purnong ferry 11 kilometres (6.8 mi) by road upstream.

There was a Bowhill East school opened in 1940 but now closed in the eastern part of what is now included in Bowhill. The dominant industries in the district are cereal grain and sheep farming.

== See also ==
- Lowan Conservation Park
