= Younghusband, South Australia =

Younghusband South Australia
- Coordinates: 34.867°S 139.466°E
- Population: 229 (SAL 2021)
- Postcode(s): 5238
- Location: 20 km (12 mi) E of Mannum
- LGA(s): Mid Murray Council
- State electorate(s): Hammond
- Federal division(s): Barker
Localities around Younghusband:
Five Miles	Lake Carlet	Caurnamont
Cowirra	Younghusband	Bowhill
Ponde, Burdett	Ettrick
- Footnotes: Adjoining localities

Younghusband is a small settlement on the left bank of the lower Murray River in South Australia near Mannum. There are views of Lake Carlet from the cliffs near the caravan park.

The historic Wilhaven house in East Front Road is listed on the South Australian Heritage Register.

Younghusband is not near the similarly named Younghusband Peninsula, which is located at the Murray Mouth.
