= Leonard Bowley =

Australian cricketer (1888–1963)

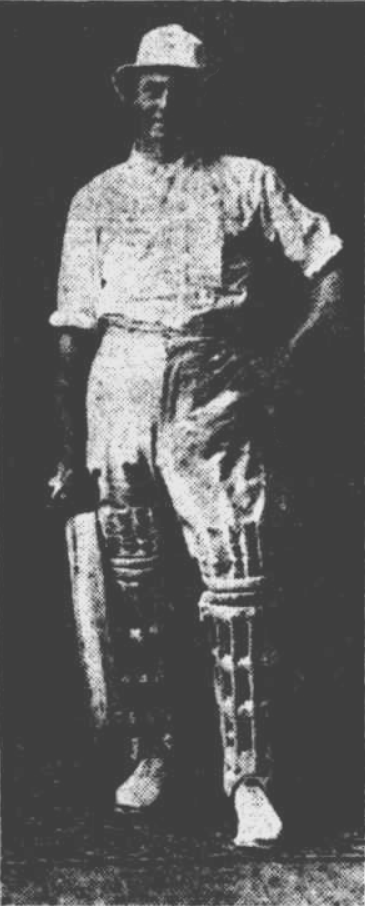

Personal information
- Full name: Edwin Leonard Bowley
- Born: 27 February 1888; Sevenhill, South Australia
- Died: 22 April 1963 (aged 75); Woodville, South Australia
- Batting: Right-handed
- Bowling: Right-arm fast-medium
- Role: Batsman

Domestic team information
- Years: Team
- 1922/23–1924/25: South Australia

Career statistics
Competition	First-class
Matches	7
Runs scored	450
Batting average	34.61
100s/50s	1/1
Top score	192
Balls bowled	112
Wickets	1
Bowling average	104.00
5 wickets in innings	0
10 wickets in match	0
Best bowling	1/52
Catches/stumpings	6/–
- Source: CricketArchive, 1 November 2016

Edwin Leonard Bowley (27 February 1888 – 22 April 1963) was an Australian cricketer who played seven first-class matches for South Australia between 1922/23 and 1924/25.

== Early sporting career ==
Born in Sevenhill, near Clare, South Australia, Bowley was for many years a leading cricketer and hockey player in rural South Australia, initially playing for Sevenhill until the club was disbanded prior to the 1911/12 season, when he moved to Clare and eventually captained Clare's cricket and hockey teams. Bowley and Arthur Richardson were considered to be two players from Clare to have a chance to play for South Australia, with Richardson later becoming Bowley's brother-in-law.

After a run of high scores for Clare, including 165 not out and 159 against Mintaro, 156 and 130 against Blyth and 102 against Broken Hill in the 1913/14 season at an average of over 100, followed by 162no and 50no against Kybunga, 105no against Blyth, and 134 against Wooroora, as well as 40 wickets at 11.52. Bowley was enticed to play in South Australian district cricket (the level below first-class cricket in South Australia) by Port Adelaide Cricket Club in the 1914/15 season.

== District cricket ==
Bowley made his senior district cricket debut for Port Adelaide against East Torrens Cricket Club on 12 December 1914, causing a sensation by taking 4/18 and scoring 30. Adelaide newspaper Daily Herald wrote "Considerable interest was manifested by the entry into senior cricket of a young Clare champion, L. Bowley, who fully justified his reputation as a batsman and bowler", and argued that Bowley be included in the next interstate game, stating "How often has a young player made his debut in senior cricket so conspicuously as Bowley did on Saturday last?"

With his batting featuring driving and cutting that "was a treat to watch" and his bowling featuring "a fairly good length, (he) mixes his deliveries well, and occasionally sends down a fast, troublesome ball", Bowley was said to have "the makings of a fine all-round cricketer" by the end of the 1914/15 season, but any chance of playing interstate cricket was dashed by the cancellation of the Sheffield Shield due to World War I. Bowley continued to play for Port Adelaide during the 1915/16 season, topping the club's bowling averages with eighteen wickets at ten. Bowley returned to Clare at the end of the season and played for Clare during the 1916/17 season.

In the 1918/19 season, Bowley returned to Adelaide to play one match for Port Adelaide, scoring 23 and taking 3/70; the local Port Adelaide News thought him to be the best of the Port Adelaide bowlers.

Unable to travel to Adelaide for matches as the local train service "did not fit in conveniently with his occupation," Bowley played for Clare in the 1920/21 season, leading one reporter to lament his absence from Adelaide cricket, considering Bowley as a possible Test cricketer. After continuing outstanding form in country cricket and against Adelaide district clubs, he continued to spark interest from the Adelaide media for his performances.

== First-class cricket ==
After initially being overlooked for South Australia's match against the touring Marylebone Cricket Club (MCC) at Adelaide Oval, Bowley was included in the side following the withdrawal of Bill Whitty, and made his first-class debut on 15 March 1923, aged 35, making 76 and 35, and taking what proved to be the only wicket of his first-class career, bowling Tom Lowry. In the first innings, Bowley shared a fifth wicket partnership of 197 with Arthur Richardson; then a record fifth wicket partnership for South Australia against an English XI. During the match, Bowley was injured in the Adelaide Oval luncheon room when Lowry attempted to open a soda water bottle, when it exploded and fragments of glass struck Bowley in the face, penetrating his upper lip.

For the 1923/24 season, Bowley returned to Adelaide to work for Holden and play for the newly formed Kensington Cricket Club and continued to be selected for interstate matches, making his highest first-class score of 192 against Queensland at the Adelaide Oval in December 1923. opening the batting, Bowley hit nineteen boundaries in his 305-minute innings.

Bowley's subsequent performances were middling and he played his final match for South Australia in the 1924/25 season, against Victoria at the Adelaide Oval, making one and zero. Although he continued to play well in district cricket, including 175 against Port Adelaide in the 1926/27 season, he was never chosen by South Australia again and continued to play district cricket until his retirement in 1936, scoring 4675 runs for Port Adelaide and Kensington at 31.16 and taking 216 wickets at 22.08.

== Personal life ==
Bowley married Minnie Lucy Trestrail on 17 October 1917 in Clare. The eldest daughter of Mr. Joseph Trestrail, Minnie was a Sunday School teacher who was heavily involved with local Methodist churches and played the piano and violin.

After leaving Holden, Bowley worked as a house painter and painted Donald Bradman's house.

Their daughter Dorothy Louise was born in Clare on 12 December 1918 and their son Bruce, who also played first-class cricket for South Australia, was born at Blyth Private Hospital in Blyth, South Australia on 1 January 1922. Bowley's grandson Ian also played for and coached Kensington Cricket Club.

Minnie died on 4 February 1931, aged 44. Bowley died on 2 April 1963, aged 75, in Adelaide, survived by his children.

== Sources ==
- Blackburn, K. (2012) The sportsmen of Changi, University of New South Wales Press: Sydney. ISBN 9781742233024.
- Page, R. (1984) South Australian Cricketers 1877-1984, Association of Cricket Statisticians: Retford, Nottinghamshire.
- Sando, G. (1997) Grass Roots, South Australian Cricket Association: Adelaide. ISBN 1 86254 435 2.
