= Benbournie, South Australia =

Benbournie South Australia
- Coordinates: 33°50′0″S 138°33′0″E
- Population: 11 (SAL 2021)
- Postcode(s): 5453
- Location: 7 km (4 mi) west of Clare; 7 km (4 mi) east of Blyth
- LGA(s): District Council of Clare and Gilbert Valleys
- Region: Mid North
- State electorate(s): Frome
- Federal division(s): Grey
Localities around Benbournie:
Blyth	Bungaree	Bungaree
Blyth	Benbournie	Armagh
Blyth	Boconnoc Park	Armagh

Benbournie (formerly Benbourni) is a rural locality in the Mid North region of South Australia, approximately halfway between the towns of Clare and Blyth. The formal boundaries of the locality were established in January 2001 with regard to the long established local name. The north-eastern corner contains a number of gazetted homesteads.

It is considered a 'lost' town (i.e. a planned town that was never subdivided), although the area was surveyed by a Private Holledge of the Royal Sappers and Miners in the 19th century. It was described as "situated near to and north-west of Emu Flat in section 2083" of the Hundred of Blyth.
