= Spring Gully =

Spring Gully may refer to:

Australia

- Spring Gully, South Australia, a locality in the District Council of Clare and Gilbert Valleys.
  - Spring Gully Conservation Park, South Australia
- Spring Gully, Victoria, Australia

United States

- Spring Gully, South Carolina
