= Armagh, South Australia =

Armagh
- Town
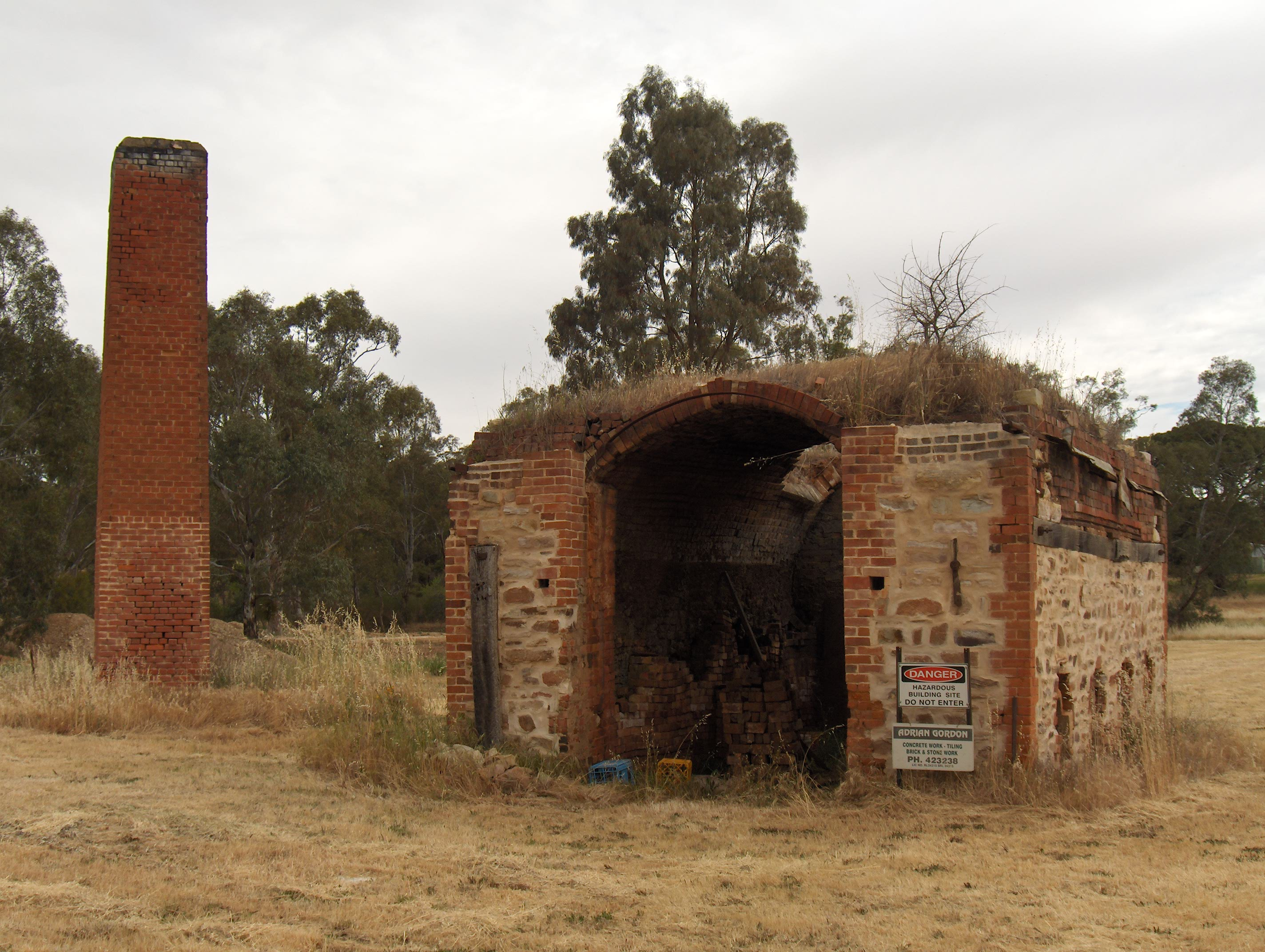
- The old disused kiln and chimney

- Coordinates: 33°50′S 138°35′E
- Country: Australia
- State: South Australia
- Region: Mid North
- LGA: District Council of Clare and Gilbert Valleys
- Location: 137 km (85 mi) north of Adelaide; 3 km (1.9 mi) west of Clare
- Established: 1850

Government
  - Mayor: Allan Aughey
  - State electorate: Frome
  - Federal division: Grey

Population
  - Total: 351 (SAL 2021)
- Postcode: 5453
Localities around Armagh
Hart	Bungaree	Stanley Flat
Benbournie, Blyth	Armagh	Clare
Boconnoc Park, Kybunga	Emu Flat, Spring Gully	Spring Farm

Armagh is a small historic village in the western Clare Valley, about 137 km north of Adelaide, South Australia.

== History ==
The village was named after the town and county of Armagh in Ireland. It was founded in 1850 to benefit from the new copper mine, operated by the Royal Mining Company at nearby Emu Flat. The mine was built as part of a mania for copper mining prompted by the large copper finds at Burra and Kapunda but, though some mining efforts continued until 1910, was never successful commercially.

== The town today ==
Today the hills around Armagh are known for the production of wine and olive oil. Most of the old town has vanished leaving only a brick kiln, claypit, a few houses and the Miner’s Home Hotel, now a private museum.
