= Blyth, South Australia =

Blyth
- Town
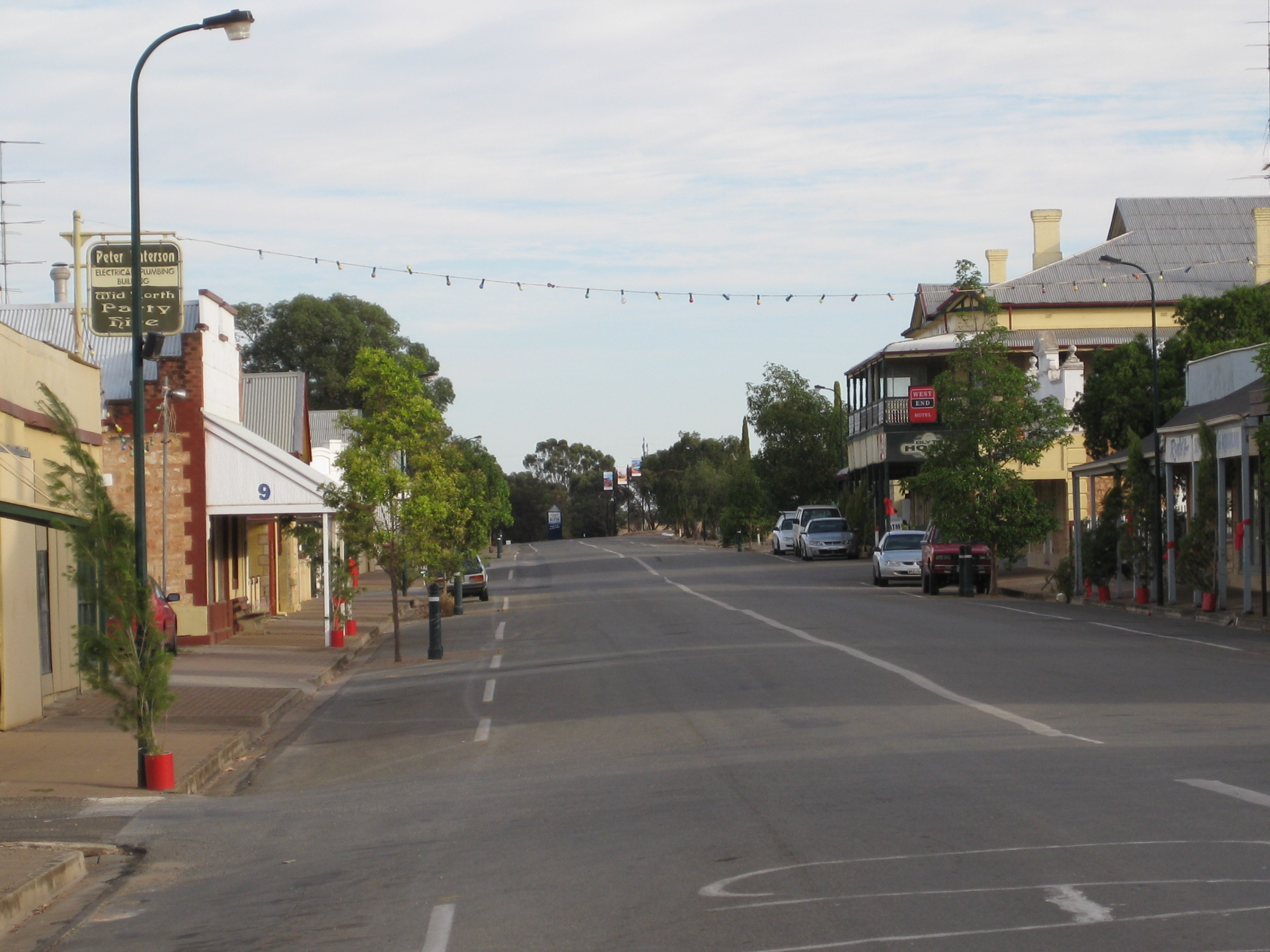
- Main street of Blyth, looking north

- Coordinates: 33°50′S 138°29′E
- Country: Australia
- State: South Australia
- Location: 132 km (82 mi) north of Adelaide
- Established: 1875

Population
  - Total: 442 (UCL 2021)
Localities around Blyth
Condowie, Snowtown	Brinkworth; Hart	Bungaree, Benbournie
Lochiel	Blyth	Armagh, Clare
Bowillia, Everard Central	Kybunga	Boconnoc Park, Spring Gully

Blyth is a small town in the Mid North of South Australia, located 13 kilometres (8.1 mi) west of the renowned Clare Valley. The town is located on the lands of the Kaurna people, the Indigenous people who lived there before European settlement. In the 2021 Australian census, the town had a population of 442.

== History ==
The Padnaindi group of the Kaurna people lived on the Blyth Plains for thousands of years before the British colonisation of South Australia.

Settler David Hughes happened upon the plains in 1842, which were named Jacob’s Plains after Hughes’ employer, John Jacob.

The Hundred of Blyth was proclaimed in 1860, carved out of land that was then a huge pastoral lease. It was named after Sir Arthur Blyth, who had three terms as Premier of South Australia. Fifteen years later, in 1875, the township was laid out on Section 198, with the railway line running through the centre of the

=== Railway ===
In 1876, Blyth was the terminus of the narrow gauge railway to Port Wakefield. This line ultimately was extended to Gladstone and converted to the broad gauge of 1,600 mm (63 in) in 1927 as the Gladstone railway line. The railway closed on 29 March 1989 and was removed shortly after.

Adjacent stations were Brinkworth to the north and Hoyleton and Halbury to the south.

== Location and description ==
The farming community around Blyth spans the plains between the Clare Hills and the Barunga/Hummocks ranges. Located approximately 132 kilometres (82 mi) north of Adelaide, the district's climate and soils are well suited to wheat, barley, legumes, hay, sheep, cattle and pigs. Altitude is 189 metres (620 ft), and rainfall is approximately 400 millimetres (16 in) per annum.

As of 2008, Blyth had a general store, post office, pub, and gallery/studio, as well as sporting facilities for football, netball, bowls, cricket, tennis and golf. Several businesses based in Blyth service the region. The Blyth Cinema is housed in a renovated Masonic Hall.

== Dean Nicolle Eucalypt Walk ==
In August 2025, the 4.4-kilometre (2.7 mi) Dean Nicolle Eucalypt Walk was opened along a section of the old railway corridor. The walk is the brainchild of local resident, artist Ian Roberts, who named it after renowned eucalypt scientist Dean Nicolle. The trail features more than 2,000 Australian plant species, including 300 varieties of rare eucalypt, planted by volunteers between 2010 and 2019. As of September 2025, Roberts had painted around 770 of the 900 species of eucalypts.

== Notable people ==
- Bruce Bowley - cricketer
- Jack Cockburn - Australian Rules footballer
- Clem Mitchell - motorcycle speedway rider
- Mike Pratt - politician
- Penny Pratt - politician
- Ian Roberts - painter
- Andrew Thomas - politician
- Frederick William Young - politician and barrister

== See also ==
- Stanley Football Association
- List of cities and towns in South Australia
- Lands administrative divisions of South Australia
