= Bruce Bowley =

Australian cricketer (1922–2014)

Personal information
- Full name: Bruce Leonard Bowley
- Born: 1 January 1922; Blyth, South Australia
- Died: 14 May 2014 (aged 92); Adelaide, South Australia
- Batting: Right-handed
- Bowling: Right-arm fast-medium
- Role: Allrounder

Domestic team information
- Years: Team
- 1947/48–1951/52: South Australia

Career statistics
Competition	First-class
Matches	30
Runs scored	1,092
Batting average	21.41
100s/50s	2/2
Top score	169
Balls bowled	4,736
Wickets	54
Bowling average	35.44
5 wickets in innings	0
10 wickets in match	0
Best bowling	4/70
Catches/stumpings	19/–
- Source: CricketArchive, 30 April 2016

Bruce Leonard Bowley OAM (1 January 1922 – 14 May 2014) was an Australian cricketer who played 30 first-class matches for South Australia between 1947 and 1952, and a World War II Prisoner of War.

== Early life ==
The son of South Australian cricketer Leonard Bowley, and Minnie (née Trestrail), Bowley was born at Blyth Private Hospital in Blyth, South Australia.

Bowley's family moved to Adelaide soon after his birth and Bowley made his Adelaide Grade debut (the level below first-class cricket in South Australia) in 1938/39 aged 16 for the South Australian Colts team. While with the Colts, Bowley was coached by former Australian cricketers Nip Pellew and Clarrie Grimmett. Bowley then moved to Kensington Cricket Club, where his father had played. Bowley's father was a house painter and Bowley assisted him on jobs, including at Donald Bradman's house.

== World War II ==
Following the outbreak of war, Bowley enlisted in the Royal Australian Air Force (RAAF) on 25 June 1940, and in September 1940 was stationed in Singapore, serving in the No. 21 Wirraway fighter squadron in the Malayan Campaign and was in Singapore when it fell to the Japanese in 1942. During this time, both in and out of captivity, Bowley continued to play cricket, including for a local team in the Malayan cricket season and one match for Australian Services against South Australia at the Adelaide Oval in December 1942, where he scored 56 against an attack that included Clarrie Grimmett and Reginald Craig. Bowley reached the rank of Sergeant by the time of his discharge on 19 October 1945.

While in Malaya, Bowley's team played the Singapore Cricket Club and Bowley was admonished by an English officer for using the same change rooms as his non-white team members. He refused to use separate change rooms and while he was awarded honorary membership of the all-white Singapore Cricket Club for his cricketing prowess, Bowley preferred to socialise with his teammates. During this time, Bowley became friends with the Malaya born Indian Test cricketer Lall Singh. They remained close for many years and Bowley stayed with Lall in Kuala Lumpur for the 1975 Hockey World Cup.

== First-class career ==
Following his return to Australia, Bowley joined East Torrens Cricket Club, Sturt before returning to Kensington in 1954/55 as captain-coach until his retirement at the end of the 1958/59 season. An all-rounder, Bowley made his first-class debut for South Australia on 20 February 1948 against Victoria at the Melbourne Cricket Ground, scoring one and nine and going wicketless.

Bowley made his highest first-class score of 169 against the touring West Indies, in December 1951, the highest score made against the West Indian team during the tour. Bowley opened the batting and scored very slowly at first, reaching his century in 283 minutes but thereafter scoring a run a minute, leading long time cricket writer Johnnie Moyes to state that Bowley had "played a curious innings"

Later in the 1951/52 season, Bowley was batting for South Australia against New South Wales when, he was struck on the head by a bouncer from fast bowler Alan Walker. Bowley was taken to hospital for tests and Richie Benaud later wrote that he was shaken by the incident as he fielding close to Bowley and "was on the spot as he (Bowley) reeled away from the crease and fell."

Bowley played his final first-class match in February 1952 against Victoria at the MCG, scoring 18 and zero and taking two wickets for 144 runs. Author Kevin Blackburn suggests that Bowley may have played Test cricket if not for the war.

Bowley was described as "by nature a stroke-maker with a tendency to throw away his wicket through a sudden ambition to hit the bright lights" while Wisden wrote of his bowling, "although his long run-up suggested more pace than he delivered, he was also a handy new-ball bowler."

== Hockey career ==
Bowley played for Burnside Hockey Club and served as President and Vice Patron of the South Australian Hockey Association, and was made a Life Member.

In addition to his father playing first-class cricket, Bowley's aunt married Test cricketer Arthur Richardson and Bowley's son Ian played for and coached Kensington.

Bowley was awarded a Medal of the Order of Australia (OAM) in 1993 for his service to hockey and cricket as a player, coach and administrator.

== Sources ==
- Benaud, R. (2010) Over But Not Out, Hatchette UK:London. ISBN 1444711210.
- Blackburn, K. (2012) The sportsmen of Changi, University of New South Wales Press: Sydney. ISBN 9781742233024.
- Grant, L. (2014) Australian Soldiers in Asia-Pacific in World War II, New South: Sydney. ISBN 1742241840.
- Moyes, A.G. (1952) With the West Indies in Australia 1951-52, Angus and Robertson: Sydney.
- Page, R. (1984) South Australian Cricketers 1877-1984, Association of Cricket Statisticians: Retford, Nottinghamshire.
- Sando, G. (1997) Grass Roots, South Australian Cricket Association: Adelaide. ISBN 1 86254 435 2.
