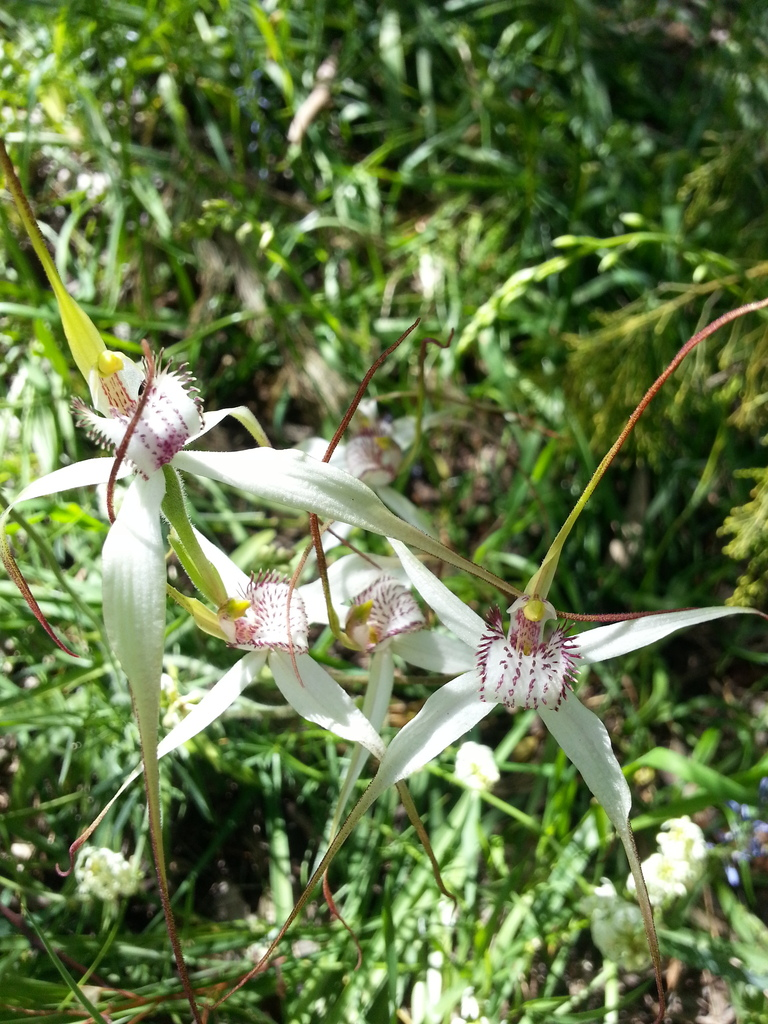

Conservation status
- Endangered (EPBC Act)

Scientific classification
- Kingdom: Plantae
- Clade: Embryophytes
- Clade: Tracheophytes
- Clade: Spermatophytes
- Clade: Angiosperms
- Clade: Monocots
- Order: Asparagales
- Family: Orchidaceae
- Subfamily: Orchidoideae
- Tribe: Diurideae
- Genus: Caladenia
- Species: C. argocalla

Binomial name
- Caladenia argocalla D.L.Jones

Synonyms
- Arachnorchis argocalla (D.L.Jones) D.L.Jones & M.A.Clem.; Calonema argocallum (D.L.Jones) Szlach.; Calonemorchis argocalla (D.L.Jones) Szlach.

= Caladenia argocalla =

White beauty spider orchid

Species of orchid

Caladenia argocalla, commonly known as white beauty spider orchid, is a plant in the orchid family Orchidaceae and is endemic to South Australia. It is a ground orchid which grows singly or in loose groups and has a single, hairy leaf and one or two white to greenish-white flowers on a wiry, hairy stalk. The total population is thought to be between 2,000 and 4,500 and it is classed as an "Endangered" species.

== Description ==
Caladenia argocalla is a terrestrial, perennial, deciduous, herb with an underground tuber and a single hairy, linear to narrow lance-shaped leaf. The leaf is erect, 12–22 cm (5–9 in) long, 10–18 mm (0.4–0.7 in) wide and dull green. The leaf appears in April or May but leaves or flowers do not appear every year, the number of flowering plants fluctuating from year to year.

One or two unscented flowers are borne on a wiry, hairy spike 30–60 cm (10–20 in) high. The flowers are about 9 cm (4 in) in diameter and are white or greenish-white with a narrow stripe along the sepals and petals. The dorsal sepal is 9–13 mm (0.4–0.5 in) long, about 4 mm (0.2 in) wide, linear to elliptic in shape but narrows to a thin, thread-like end about 1.5 mm (0.06 in) wide. The lateral sepals are 10–15 mm (0.4–0.6 in) long, about 7–10 mm (0.3–0.4 in) wide, egg-shaped to lance-shaped in the lower part but taper to a long thin thread-like end. The petals are 7.5–9.5 mm (0.3–0.4 in) long, about 5–6.5 mm (0.2–0.3 in) wide and have a similar shape to the sepals. The labellum is egg-shaped to heart-shaped, erect near its base but curves forward, especially towards its end. There are ten to twelve white or purplish calli up to 3 mm (0.1 in) long along the edges of the labellum and six to eight rows of red or white golf-club shaped calli in the centre and extending almost to the tip of the labellum. The column is 15–17 mm (0.6–0.7 in) long and transparent with reddish stripes and other shapes as well as broad wings. Flowering occurs from September to October.

== Taxonomy and naming ==
Caladenia argocalla was first formally described by David L. Jones in 1991 and the description was published in Australian Orchid Research. The type specimen was collected near Kapunda. The specific epithet (argocalla) is derived from the Ancient Greek words argos meaning "white" and kallos meaning "beautiful" in reference to the common name.

== Distribution and habitat ==
White beauty spider orchid grows on hills and slopes in forest, usually with sheoaks. It is only known from thirteen subpopulations in the hills north of Adelaide, including in the Spring Gully Conservation Park.

== Conservation ==
The total size of the population of this species in 2006 was estimated to be between 2,000 and 4,500 individuals. The main threats to its survival are considered to be habitat degradation, weed invasion, lack of pollinators and grazing by native, domestic and feral animals. It is classified as "Endangered" under the South Australian National Parks and Wildlife Act 1972 and the Commonwealth Government Environment Protection and Biodiversity Conservation Act 1999 (EPBC) Act.
