= Hooper Brewster-Jones =

Australian composer

- Born: c.1887 Orroroo, Australia
- Died: 1949
- Occupations: Musician, composer, teacher, music critic

Hooper Josse Brewster-Jones (1887–1949) was a musician, composer, teacher and music critic, born near Orroroo on the Black Rock Plain, South Australia.

His parents were William Arthur Jones (c. 1855–1947), a school master, and Rebecca née Williams. He attended school at Armagh and Bute, where he was taught by his father, including music. In June 1896, he performed a duet with Rebie Jones and then his own composition, "The Bute March" – he celebrated his ninth birthday a few days later. He left home at age 13 to board in Adelaide. Jones studied piano at the Elder Conservatorium of Music from 1901. While there, he won an Elder Overseas Scholarship to study at London's Royal College of Music focussing on composition, chamber music and piano. His farewell concert in June 1905 at the Adelaide Town Hall's Banqueting-room provided, "Bach's 'Prelude and fugue', in A minor (transcribed by Liszt), Chopin's "'Nocturne in E major', 'Etude in F major', and 'Scherzo in B minor', and three works by Liszt."

He returned to Adelaide in 1909 to teach piano, composition and singing. He provided a recital at the town hall in November, and The Advertiser's critic opined, "The young pianist proved quite equal to the demands of the difficult composition, and his interpretation was decidedly effective. Certainly the outburst of applause which followed was well earned, and it is not too much to say that the artist demonstrated that he is qualified to take his place amongst the first rank pianists of Australia." In the following year, in June, he married Gerta Homburg, an amateur singer and authority on German lieder.

During 1916, Brewster-Jones composed an opera in three acts. A correspondent from The Advertiser described the work, "The subject is an old Irish tragedy, 'Deirdre', and he has adopted a prose libretto. The 'solo', requirements are two sopranos, tenor, baritone, and bass. No chorus is introduced."

Kate Bowan of the Journal of Music Research Online observed, "[he] produced an enormous amount of music, particularly during the 1920s. Some of the music written during this decade, such as the Formula Series, a set of piano preludes, places him in the world of transnational modernism."

His works include an opera The Nightingale and the Rose from The Happy Prince and Other Tales. He worked with the Australian Broadcasting Commission as a pianist, radio lecturer and conductor of the state's studio orchestra in the 1930s. From 1935 to 1940 he was a music critic for The Advertiser and then for the News. He retired in the late 1940s.

His son, Arthur Brewster-Jones, was the conductor of the Adelaide Stringster Orchestra. Hooper Brewster-Jones' last performance was the D minor Mozart piano concerto with his son's orchestra – he died of a heart attack fifteen minutes later. Upon his death, Hooper Brewster-Jones left his wife, two of three sons and a daughter.

He is the grandfather of John and Rick Brewster, who are the founder members of hard rockers, the Angels. There is a plaque in his honour on the Jubilee 150 Walkway.

== Published works ==
- Tintner, Georg; Brewster-Jones, Hooper; Symphony Australia (1955), Chaconne and Fugue on a Theme by Brewster-Jones
