= Clare, South Australia =

Clare
- Town
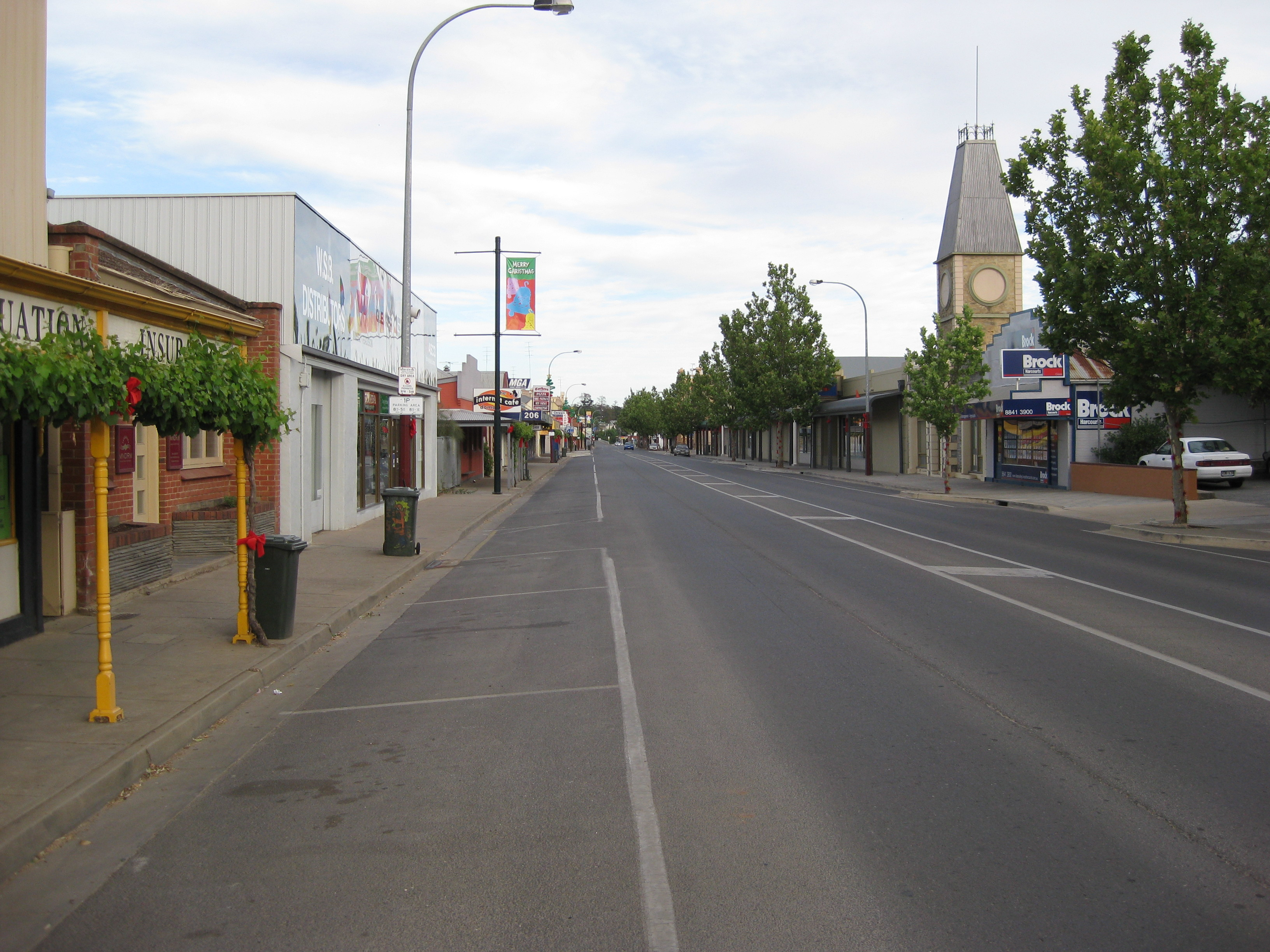
- Main North Road, looking north (Note the former town hall on the right side of main street)

- Coordinates: 33°50′0″S 138°36′0″E
- Country: Australia
- State: South Australia
- Region: Yorke and Mid North
- LGA: District Council of Clare and Gilbert Valleys
- Location: 136 km (85 mi) north of Adelaide; 92 km (57 mi) north of Gawler
- Established: 1842

Government
  - Mayor: Allan Aughey
  - State electorate: Ngadjuri
  - Federal division: Grey
- Elevation: 392 m (1,286 ft)

Population
  - Total: 3,379 (UCL 2021)
- Postcode: 5453
Localities around Clare
Benbournie; Bungaree	Stanley Flat; Barinia	Hill Town
Armagh; Boconnoc Park; Blyth	Clare	Spring Farm; Hill River; Farrell Flat
Emu Flat; Spring Gully; Kybunga	Gillentown; Sevenhill; Penwortham	Polish Hill River; Mintaro

The town of Clare is located in South Australia in the Mid North region, 136 km north of Adelaide. It gives its name to the Clare Valley wine and tourist region.

At the 2016 census, Clare itself had a population of 3160 as part of an urban area with 3327 people.

== History ==
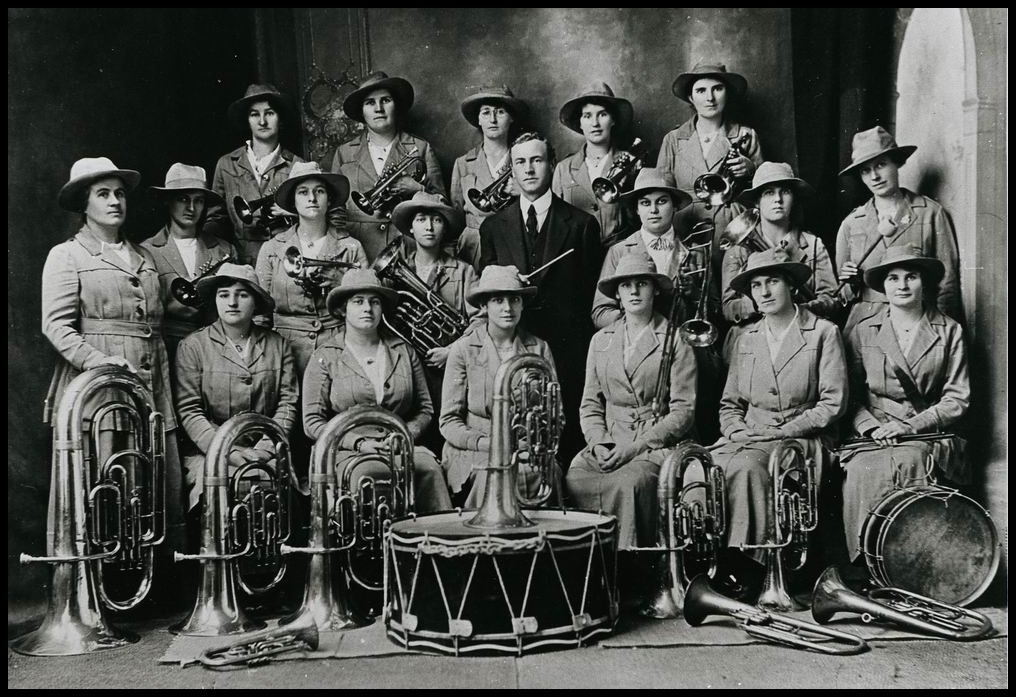
Clare Girls Band 1914

The first European to explore the district was John Hill, who in April 1839 discovered and named the Wakefield River and Hutt River. In early 1840 the first European settlers arrived in the district, led by John Horrocks. The town itself was established in 1842 by Edward Burton Gleeson, and named after his ancestral home of County Clare in Ireland, although the town was first named Inchiquin after Gleeson's property. Lake Inchiquin is now the name of a reservoir located to the north of the town, near the golf club. The layout of the town's road system was apparently designed by a draughtsman in Adelaide, without any knowledge of the local geography. There are several roads in Clare that end abruptly at a cliff face, only to continue again at the top of the cliff, e.g. Wright Street to the top of Billy Goat Hill, and continued as Wright Lane below, running by Woolworths.

The District Council of Clare was established in 1853 and was joined in 1868 by a corporate municipality, the Corporation of Clare. The corporate town seceded from the district council to provide dedicated local government to the township but re-amalgamated with the district council in 1969.

A railway line was built from Riverton to Clare in 1918 and on to Spalding in 1922. It closed in 1984 and the tracks were removed in the following years after damage caused by the Ash Wednesday fires of 1983. The alignment now carries the Riesling Trail walking and cycling trail from Auburn to Barinia.

== County of Stanley ==
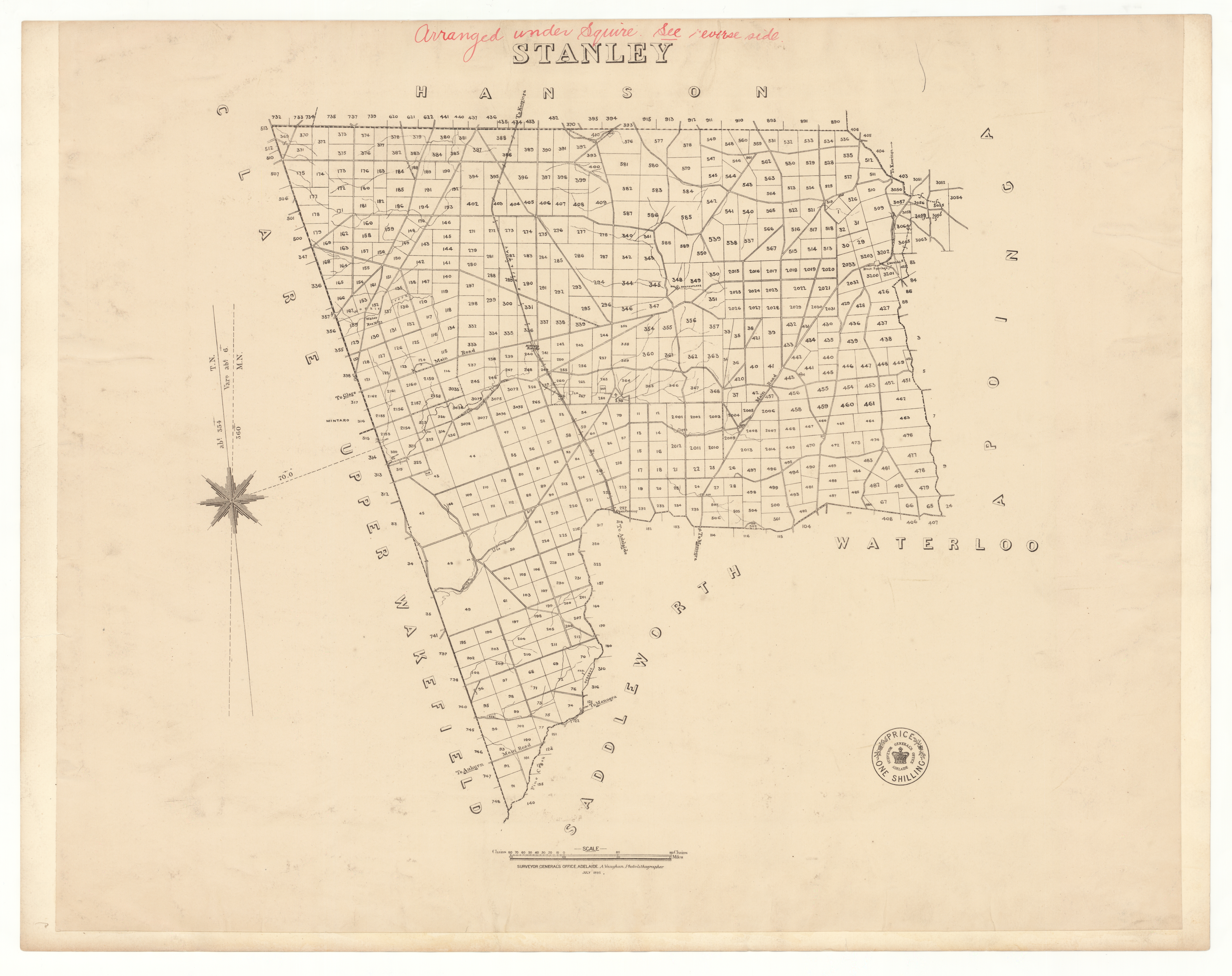
The Hundred of Stanley, 1895, east of Clare

The County of Stanley, in which lies the town of Clare, is one of the 49 cadastral counties of South Australia. It was proclaimed by Governor George Grey and named for Edward Stanley, Secretary of State for the Colonies from 1841 to 1845. The Hundred of Clare is centred on the town of Clare. Within the Stanley County also lies the Hundred of Stanley which contains the eastern Clare Valley.

This area was also the location of the Electoral district of Stanley for which, from 1862, the chief polling place was listed as Clare, with subsidiary polling places at Auburn, Mudla Wirra (Gawler), and Baker's Springs (Rhynie). This electorate was only abolished in 1956. Townships served by the seat of Stanley from 1875 included Port Pirie, Crystal Brook, Clare, Snowtown and Port Broughton. In 1997 Clare and the surrounding district became a part of the much larger District Council of Clare and Gilbert Valleys for the purpose of local governance.

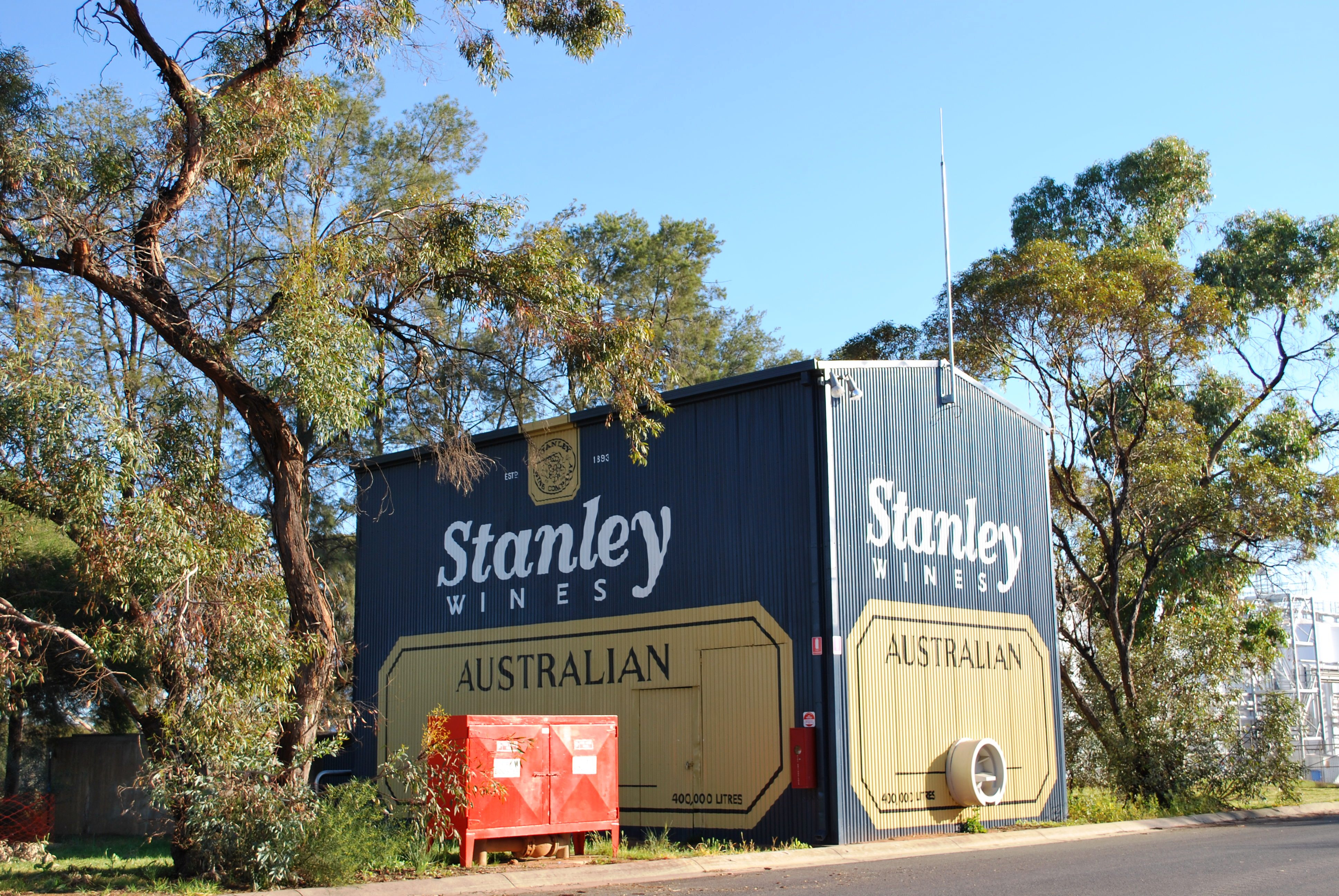
The "Big Wine Cask" at the Stanley Constellation winery in NSW

Historical population
Year	Pop.	±%
1921	1,062	—
1933	1,457	+37.2%
1947	1,454	−0.2%
1954	1,579	+8.6%
1961	1,622	+2.7%
1966	1,582	−2.5%
1971	2,099	+32.7%
1976	2,327	+10.9%
1981	2,381	+2.3%
1986	2,591	+8.8%
1991	2,575	−0.6%
1996	2,815	+9.3%
2001	2,921	+3.8%
2006	3,063	+4.9%
2011	3,278	+7.0%
2016	3,327	+1.5%
2021	3,379	+1.6%
Source: Australian Bureau of Statistics data.

== Stanley Wine Company ==
Clare is the original location of the Stanley Wine Company, founded in 1894 by Joseph Herman Knappstein; the brand is now owned by Accolade Wines for cask wine packaged for the "drink now" market. Local winery "Mr. Mick" is named for Stanley Wine's Managing Director (1962–1976) Carl Knappstein, known as "Mick", the legendary Stanley Wine Maker.

Wine grapes have been grown around Clare since the early 1840s, with the early explorer John Horrocks planting the first vines at Penwortham. Pioneer Edward Burton Gleeson (the founder of Clare, and its first mayor) also planted approximately 800 vines at his Clare estate 'Inchiquin' in the 1840s. Many small vineyards were then planted, the main ones being planted by winemaker J.H. Knappstein, settler John Hope and brewer John Christison.

For example, in 1904 the Stanley Wine Company completed a large shipment of casks of wine for London totalling about 70,000 gallons. Clare Valley wines exported (in casks) were mainly Stanley port, with "its unique and palatable flavor". This port, with dry burgundy and brandy, formed the bulk of the production sold to Britain, for which the wines had to be preserved ("fortified") with extra distilled spirit, much as we now know our Muscats and Port wines.

Clare's most prestigious winery is at Wendouree, two and a half miles south-east of Clare (but closed to the public), which is "a fine little cellar in a family tradition" that specialises in high-class organic wine production. Mr. A. P. Birks established this cellar "in a tiny way" in a shed in 1895. It is now renowned for its limited volume production of exclusive Wendouree red wines. Penfold's famous Grange also has sources in the Clare Valley.

== The town today ==
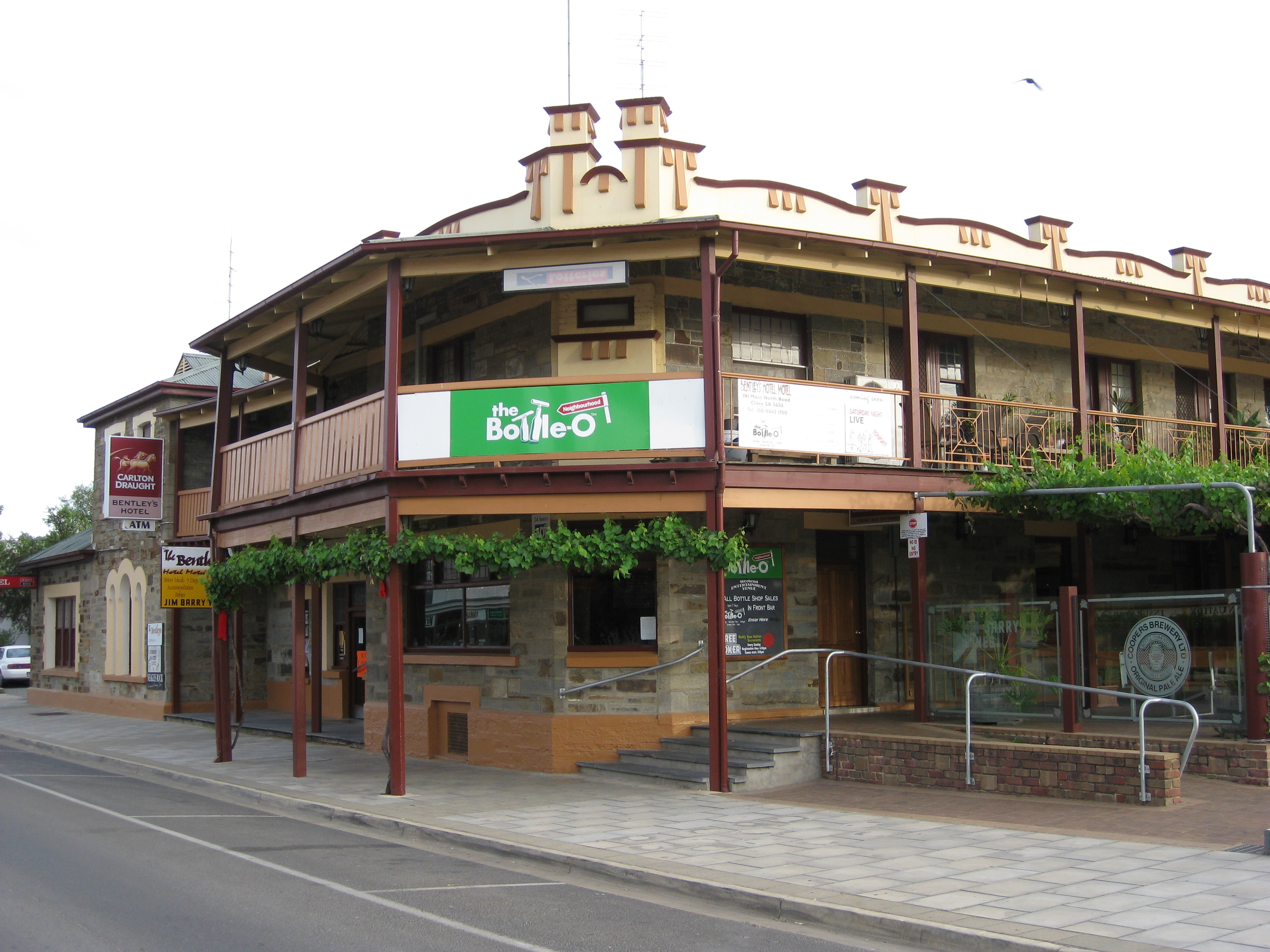
Bentley Hotel, Clare

As one of the larger towns in the region, Clare is an administrative and service centre for the surrounding area. It has two supermarkets, many other specialty stores, two public and two private schools, three hotels, two motels, a caravan park, race course and showground.

Clare has become recognised for its 'experiences', including the Riesling Trail walking and cycling route from 9 km north of Clare to Auburn (25 km), on the former railway alignment, so named as it weaves past vineyards and wineries, and continuing to Riverton as the Rattler Trail.

The Riesling Trail also makes up a small section of the popular, 900 km (560 mi) Mawson Trail which stretches up to the Flinders Ranges.

Clare is the starting point of the Lavender Federation Trail which traverses the eastern side of the Mount Lofty Ranges past the Barossa Valley through to Murray Bridge. The Clare Valley wine region continues within the same line of hills as the famous Barossa Valley, and also produces wine.

The Clare Valley Wine and Wilderness Trail is a 100 km hiking and cycling trail designed to highlight the premium wine and food and landscapes of the Clare Valley, starting at the Clare Valley Information Centre, Horrocks Highway, 3 km south of Clare.

== Attractions ==
The township of Clare is home to two wineries at opposite ends of the town:

- The Knappstein Enterprise Winery, 2 Pioneer Ave, Clare SA (the old Clare Brewery)
- Mr. Mick Cellar Door and Restaurant, 7 Dominic St, Clare SA (the old Stanley Winery)

and book-ended by Jim Barry winery in the north and Tim Adams winery to the south. A half-dozen restaurants are situated in and around Clare, counting Cellar Door Restaurants at surrounding wineries. A further dozen or more wineries surround the town: including Taylors, Kirrihill, Kilikanoon, and Shut The Gate Wines. The Clare Valley contains over forty cellar doors and wineries in all.

- A third original Clare Winery was The Clarevale Cooperative Winery, the buildings of which still survive in Lennon Street Clare across from the Clarevale Cottage, the Manager's home. This winery was founded in 1930, with a loan of 8,000 pounds from the State Government, but started crushing wine in 1929. It was later taken over by Kaiser Stuhl.
- The Clare Valley Visitor Information Centre is incorporated within the Clare Valley Wine, Food and Tourism Centre, located 3 km south of Clare on the Horrocks Highway, at 8 Spring Gully Rd, Clare SA.

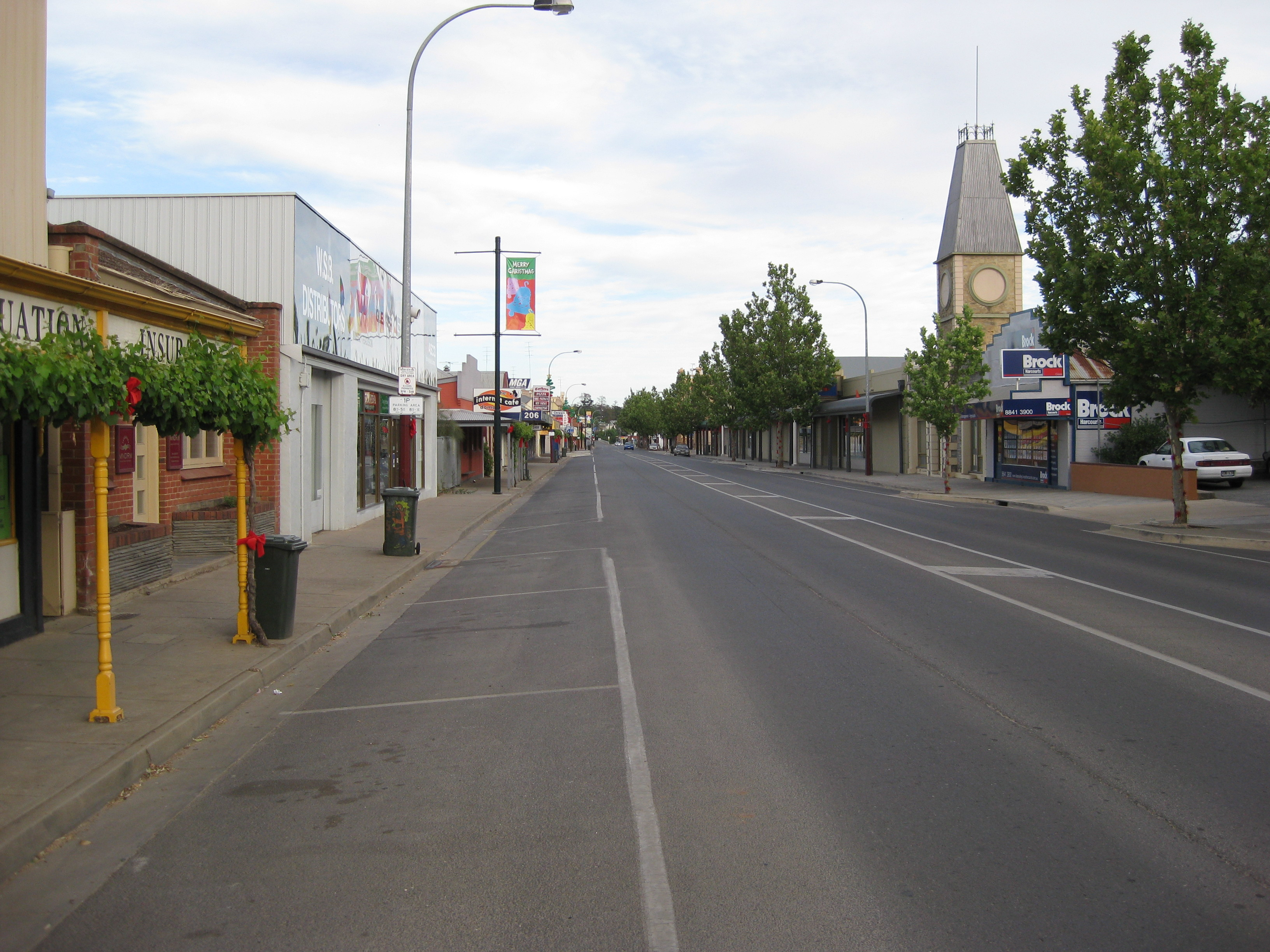
Looking up the main street (Horrocks Highway) of Clare, South Australia, in 2009, with the tower of the old Town Hall

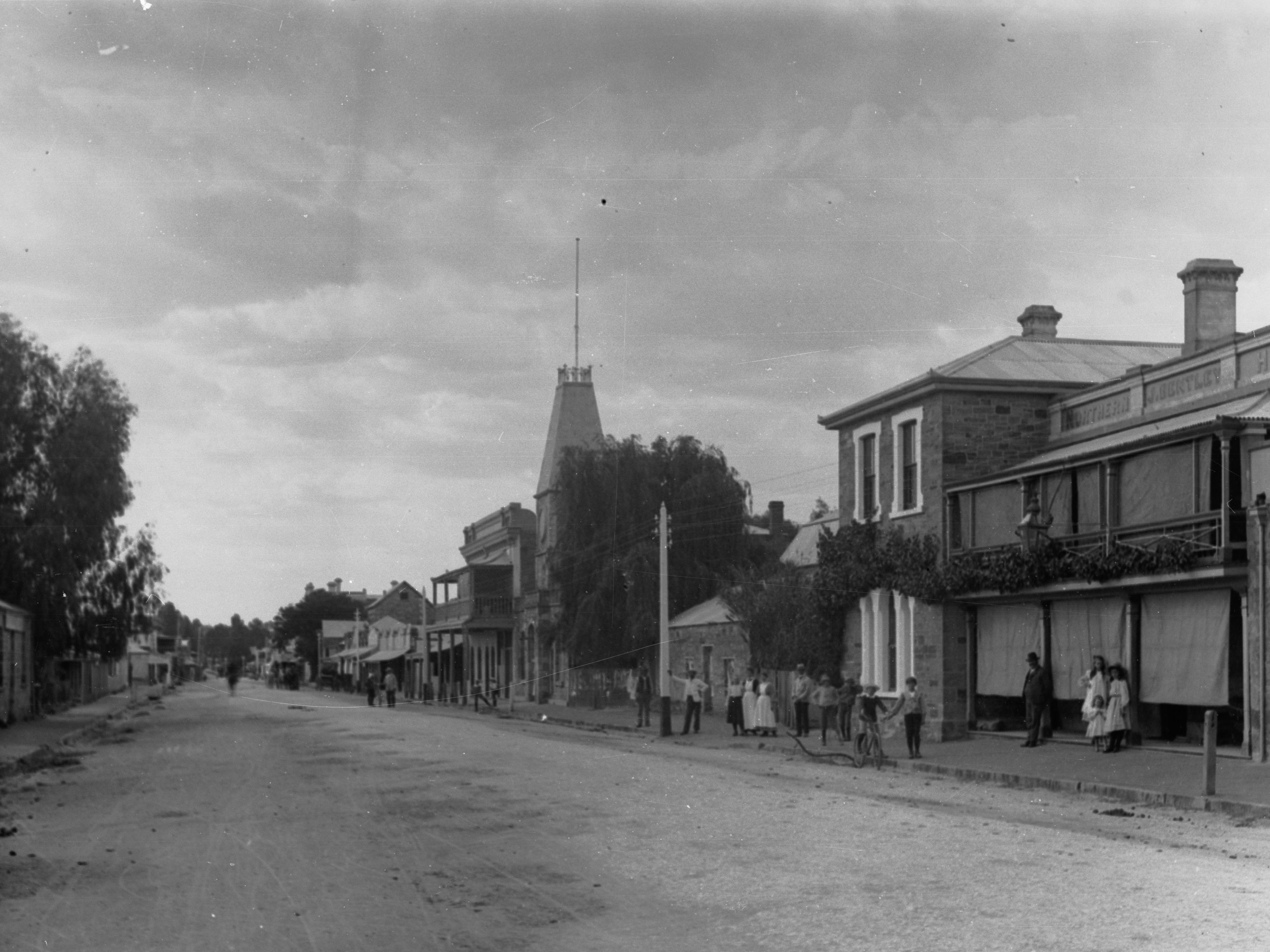
The same view of Main Street Clare over 100 years ago; from the women's dress and lack of motor vehicles, prior to 1910

- The Clare Museum of the National Trust of SA is at the Corner, Neagles Rock Road and Victoria Road Clare 5453 SA, about 1 km South of Main Street. Open 1-3 PM Saturdays, and 10-3 PM Sundays and public holidays, except Christmas and Good Friday.
- The popular Clare Regional History Group has a large collection of historical books, newspapers and memorabilia at the Clare Town Hall, open to the public on Friday afternoons 1-4 PM, and on monthly Saturday Market days.
- The Monthly Clare Show Market is held on the second Saturday of the Month at Ennis Park, alongside the Clare Town Hall.
- Clare Valley Market in the car park at The Clare Valley Info. Centre at the Clare Valley Wine, Food and Tourism Centre, south of Clare on Spring Gully Rd. is a licensed market held in March, September (24/9/22) and November (25/9/2022).
- The Clare Mini-railway at the "Lakeside Railway": The Clare Valley Model Engineers have a railway with over one kilometre of track that features several bridges and a tunnel in a 10 hectare park. and the train operates every second and fourth weekend of each month at Melrose Park, Phoenix Ave, Clare SA.

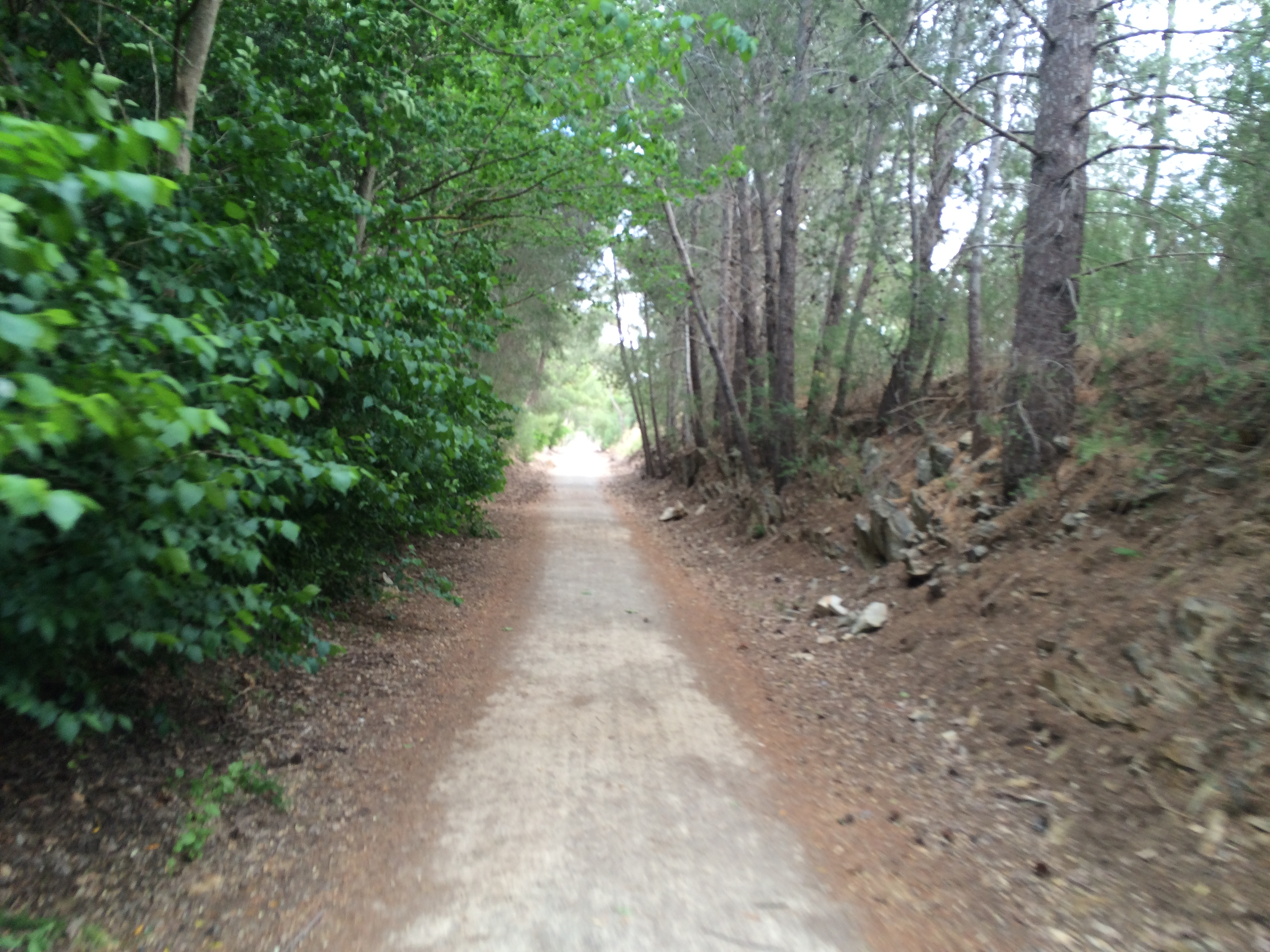
The Riesling Trail

- The Gleeson Wetlands, including Lake Inchiquin, has a flat easy walking path, with the opportunity to view many native birds in their natural habitat. There are two picnic shelters, and a bird hide. Further along there is a pathway through Melrose Park which links to the Riesling Trail.
- There are five lookouts around Clare:
  - Billy Goat Hill, Wright Street, central Clare, is a lookout on a Council Reserve, reached upstairs and via a high footpath above an old quarry (behind Woolworths), overlooking Clare. It is also accessible by car via Union Street from Mill Street.
  - Neagle's Rock Lookout is a Clare favourite, and only 1 km south from the crossroad by the National Trust Clare Museum and Wolta Wolta heritage homestead. The peak is about a 20 minute steep walk, and has a long history of family picnics. In October 1935 it was announced that a public subscription had raised money toward public ownership of the site, which is now run by the local Council. The lookout park contains many ecologically important flora species, including rare remnant of Peppermint Box eucalypt woodland. Listen for the birdsong of the White-plumed Honeyeater, Australian Magpie, Adelaide Rosella, the Grey Shrikethrush, and of the Rufous Whistler.
  - Quarry Hill Lookout is a lookout near Clare, located on Quarry Road, which runs east off Main North Rd, just south of the caravan park, about 4 km south of Clare township. At 276 Quarry Rd, Polish Hill River SA 5453. There is information about Clare Valley Rocks on the display sign at the lookout.
  - Brooks Lookout, on the steep Old Blyth Road west of Armagh, has panoramic views west over Blyth township and the Condowie Plain, with views to the Hummocks and a possible glimpse of Gulf St Vincent. It is closed in summer due to the danger of bushfire. Reach it from sign-posted turn-offs from the Blyth Road below Armagh.

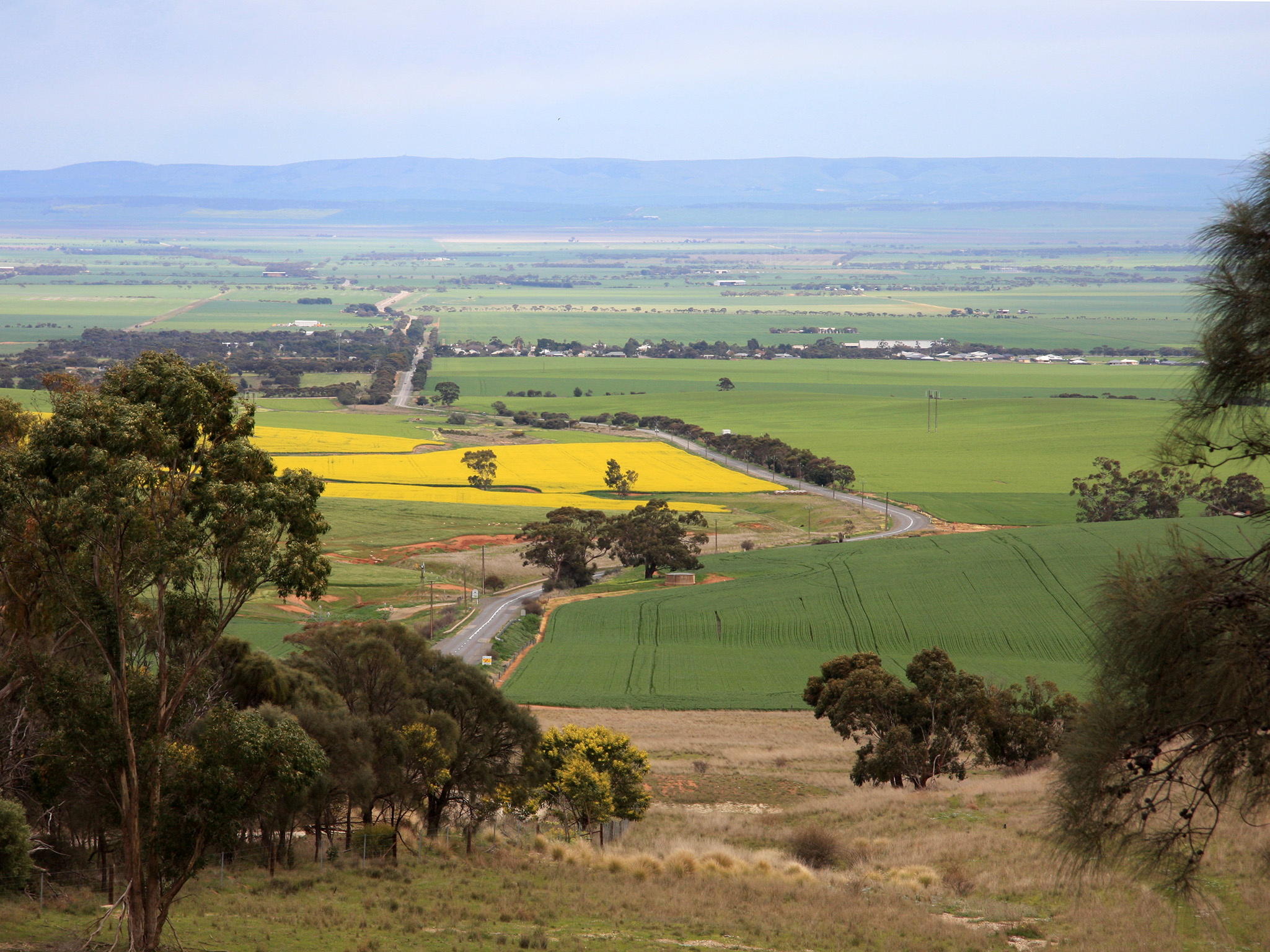
The panoramic view to the west from Brooks Lookout on the Old Blyth Road from Armagh

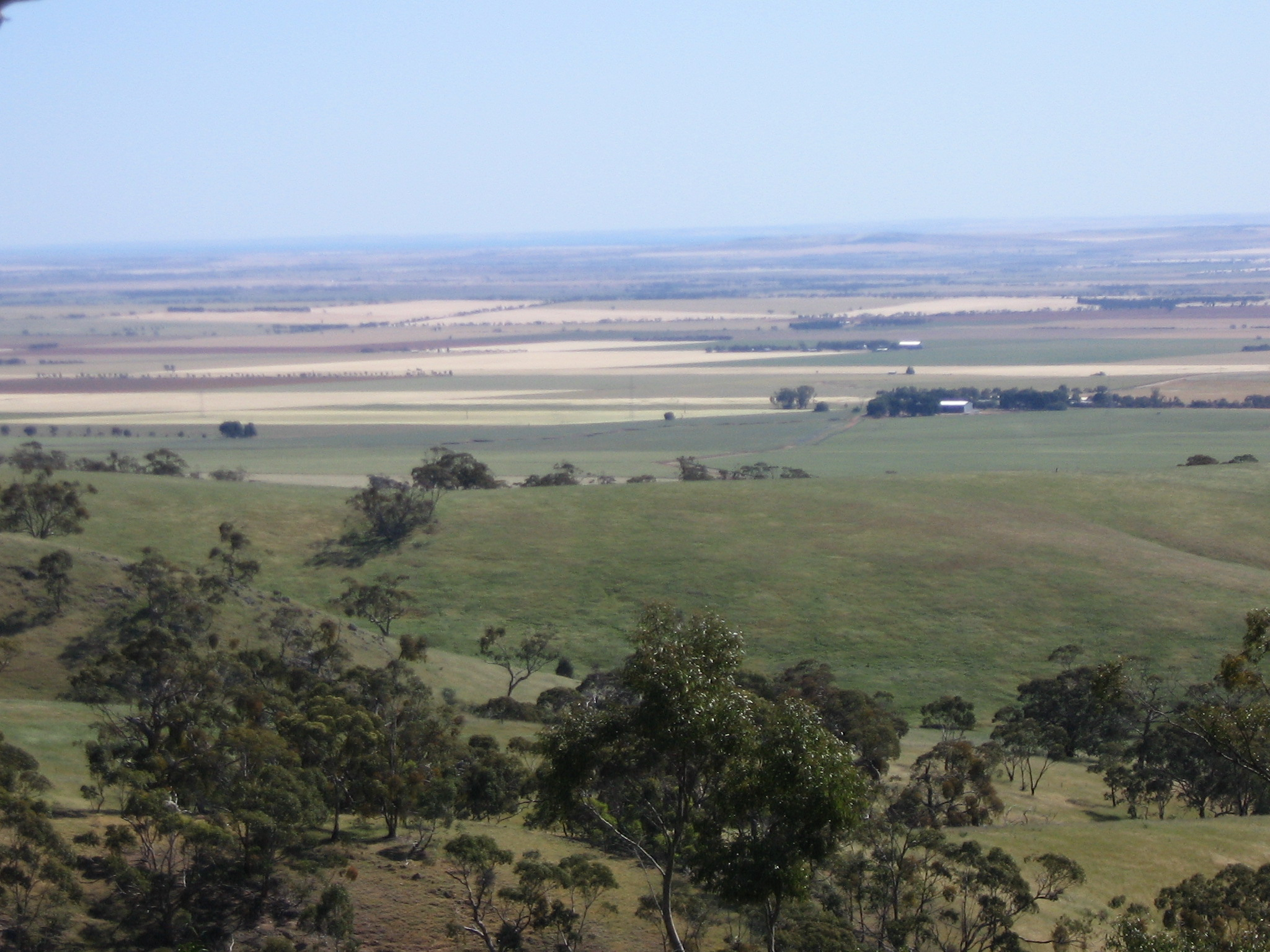
South-western view from Spring Gully Park, Clare

- Spring Gully Conservation Park: This park about 6 km south of Clare preserves the remnants of the only stand of red stringybark (Eucalyptus macrorhyncha) in South Australia. It is a relic population left behind from a wetter time so is mostly treed with peppermint gum (Eucalyptus odorata), southern Cypress pine (Callitris gracilis) and golden wattle (Acacia pycnantha). Blackboy trees (Xanthorrhoea species) are present, and western grey kangaroos and euros may be seen at dawn or at dusk.
- Clare Valley Art Gallery has an extensive range of contemporary Utopian Indigenous Art, with regular visiting artists, at 28 Horrocks Highway, Clare
- The Clare Art House has exhibits, presentations, art and craft workshops and lessons, 8 Mill Street Clare
- The Riesling Trail runs past the location of the old Clare Railway Station, and extends up the valley to Auburn.
- The great Hill River Stone Wall, estimated to contain 7,040.000 stones, commences about 3 km South of the Farrell Flat road East of Clare, by Claremont Road.

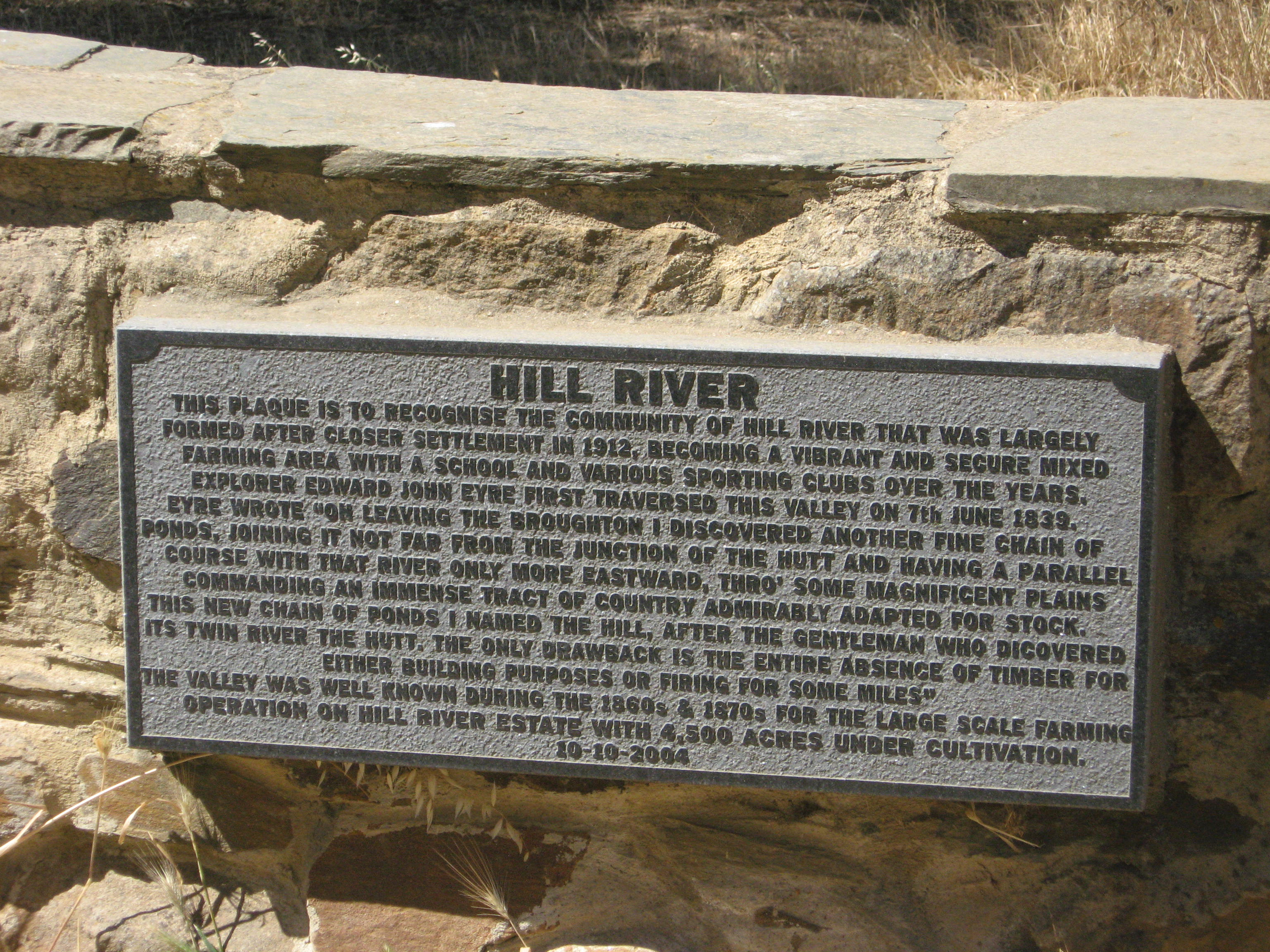
Hill River plaque

It continues Northwards to Gum Creek and Leighton, up big hills and down dales to Spalding and Booborowie on a level with Jamestown, finally ending at the top end of Canowie. It seems fairly certain the Hill River wall was built in the 1860s by tradesmen of the celebrated pioneering pastoralist, C. B. Fisher, principally to keep sheep within bounds. Also known as "The "Camel Hump Wall", it is a drystone wall which runs over 30 kilometres (19 mi) from Booborowie to Farrell Flat, and another equal distance further south to the former farm of Mr. David Ashby, totalling 62 kilometres. "Camel Hump Wall" is said to be the longest continuous dry stone wall in Australia, and should be heritage listed.

- Bungaree Station, 12 km north of Clare, has a sandstone Woolshed (one of Australia's oldest working woolsheds, constructed from 1842), Shearers' Quarters, Stable Yard, Station Store, Manager's House, staff cottages and B&B accommodation, and even the old District Council Chambers and a Church. It is still a working farm, run by the 4th, 5th and 6th generations of the Hawker family. Bungaree was established like a small English village with the manor house, police station, St Michael's Anglican Church in the Gothic style (1864), and also has a thriving tourism business, created after the wool crash of 1985.
Bungaree Station in 1906
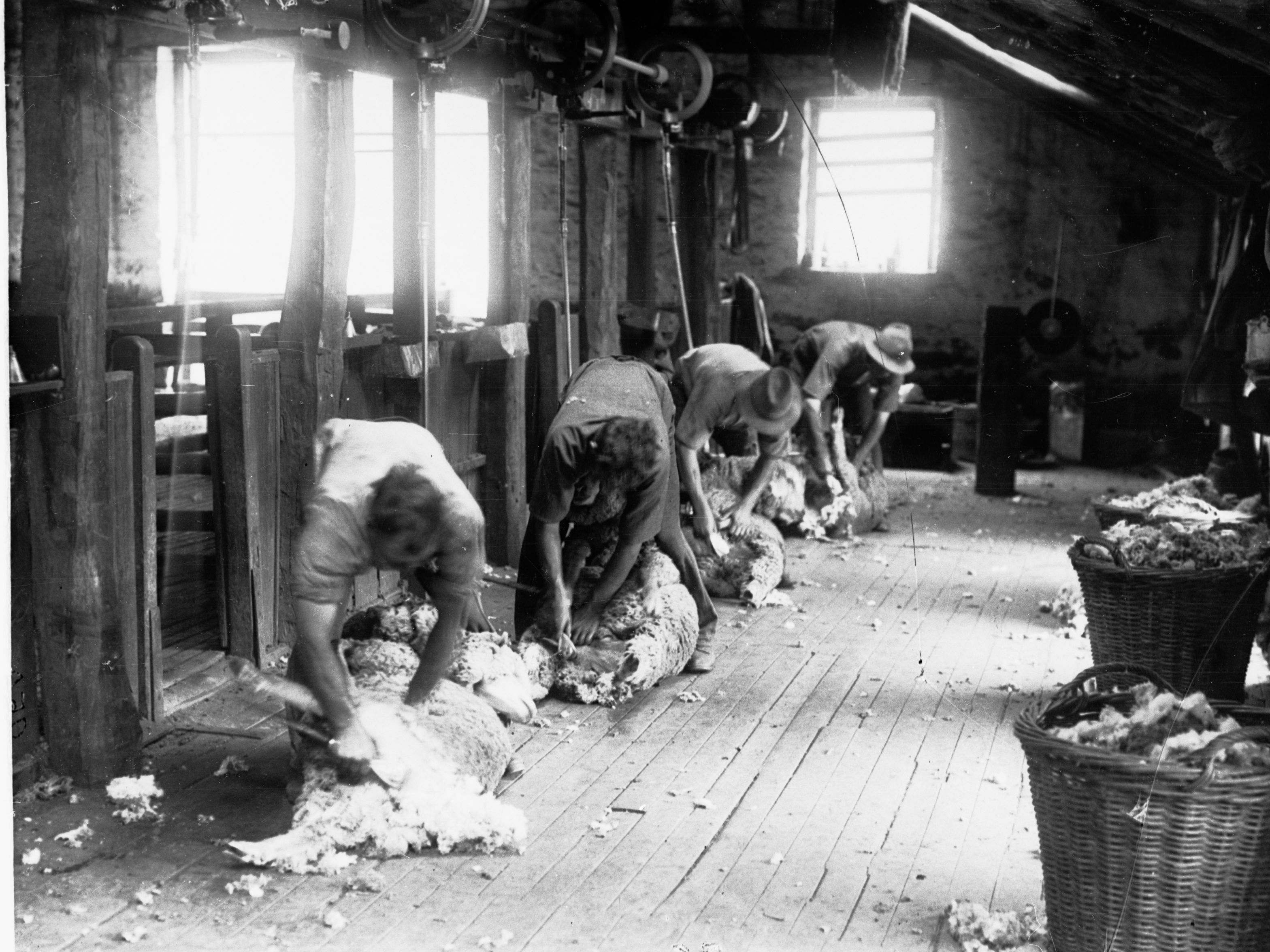
Shearing Sheep at Bungaree

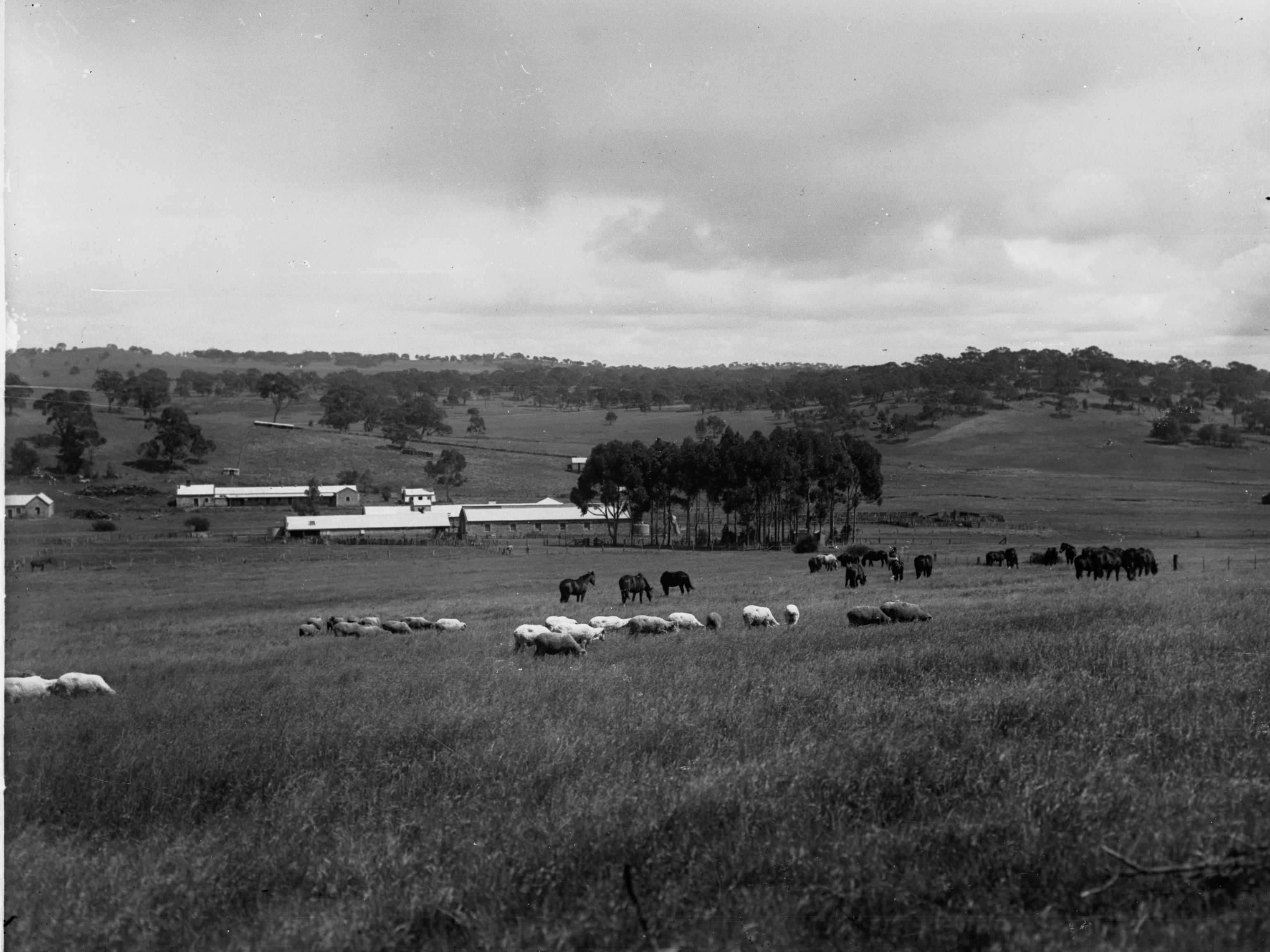
Bungaree Station buildings with sheep in 1906

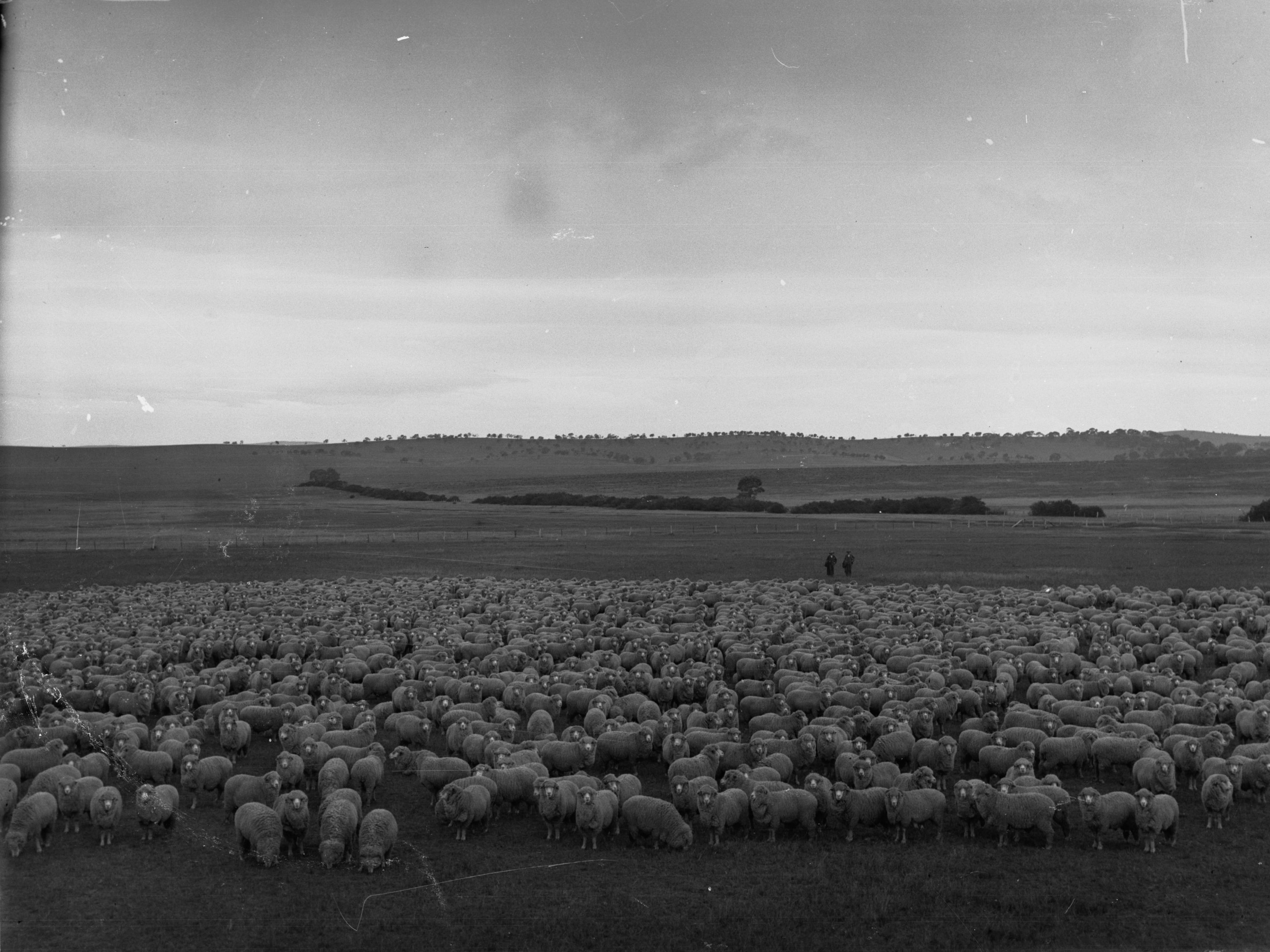
Bungaree with a mob of 1,960 sheep which had just walked to Bungaree from Paralana Station

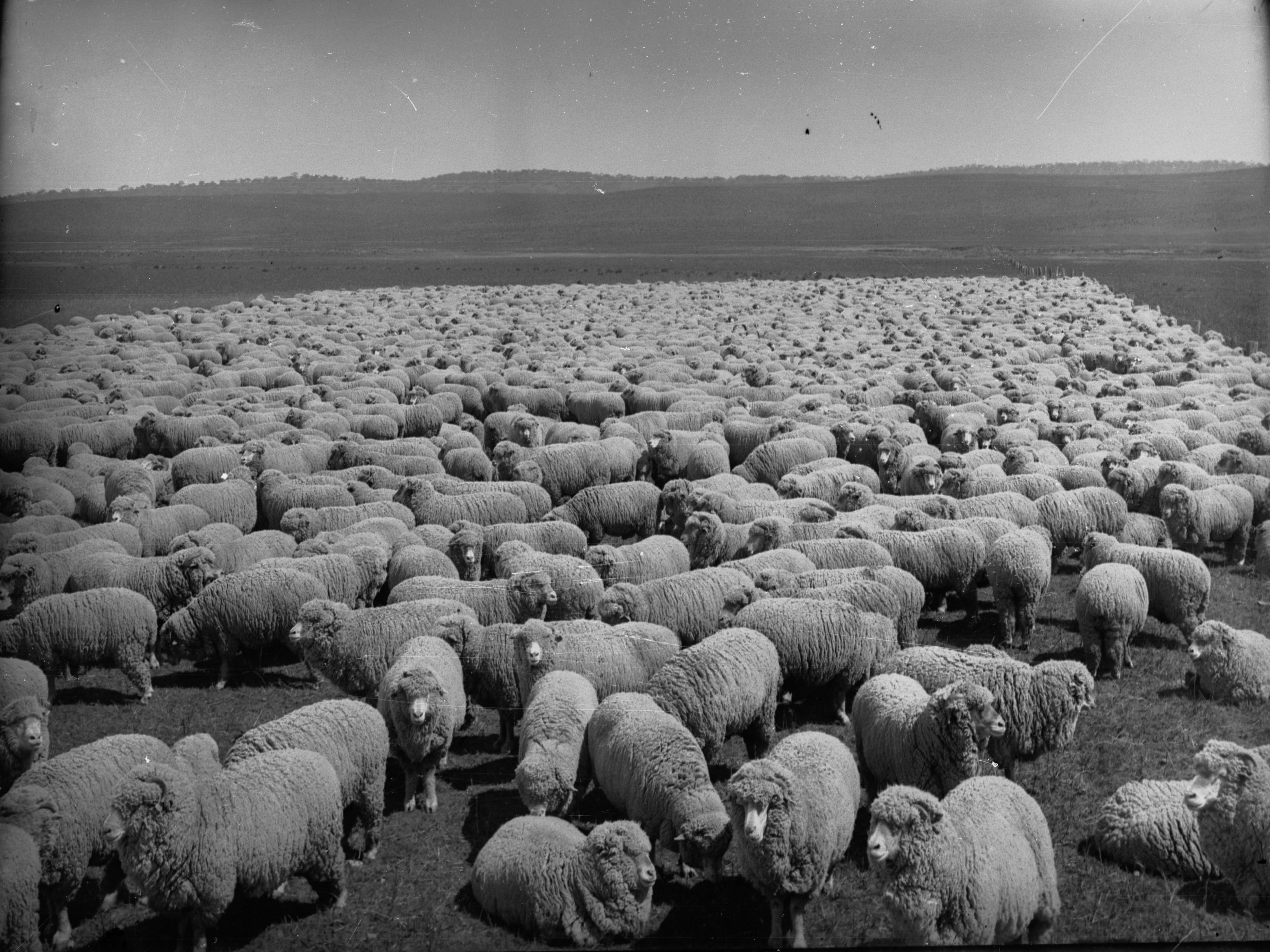
Bungaree Station with sheep in 1906. This closely resembles a photograph which hangs as an original framed print in the Bungaree woolshed.

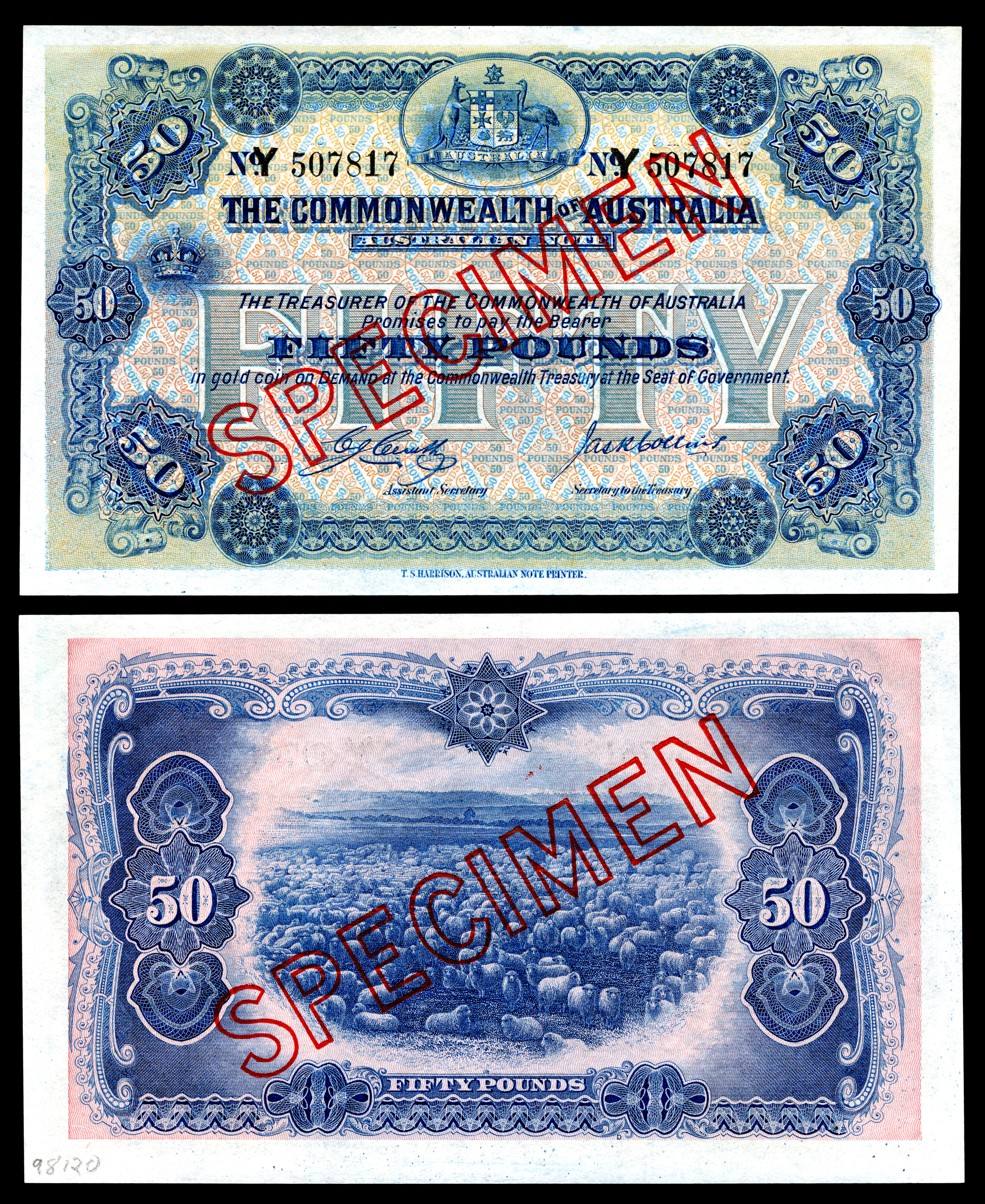
Commonwealth of Australia 50 Pounds Note (1918)

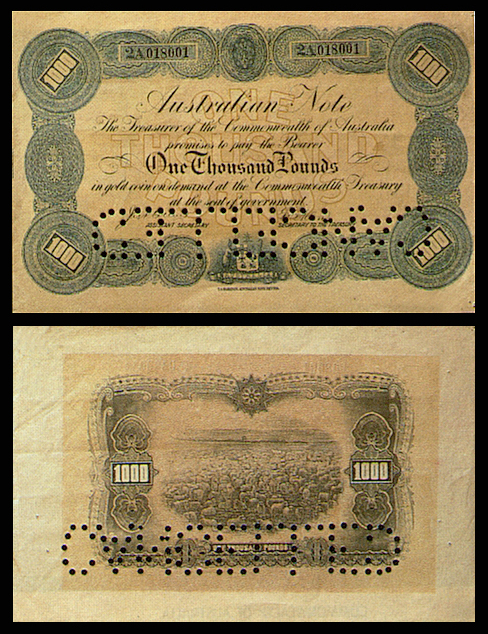
Commonwealth of Australia 1000 Pounds (1914-24)

These 1906 photographs shows a mob of 1,960 sheep which had just walked to Bungaree from Paralana Station in the Northern Flinders Ranges (also run by the Hawker Family). The particular interest of this photo of Bungaree is that it later became famous, when an engraving was made of it and it was used on both the £50 and £1000 Australian banknotes (The £1000 note was used for inter-bank transactions).

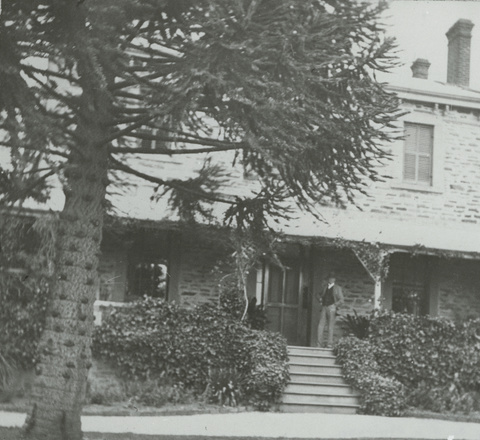
Old Kadlunga homestead near Mintaro, in 1901

"Australia was Riding on the Sheep's Back" meaning that, for much of Australia's recent history wool has been the basis of the national economy and the country's major export. Those graziers who grew the wool had come to symbolise and epitomise what it was to be Australian.

Other historic sheep stations in the Clare Valley are:

- Hill River Estate (east of Clare), founded by C.B. Fisher) and
- Hughes Park estate (south-west of Clare).
- Boconnoc Park estate lies west of Armagh around the Blyth Road.
- The Kadlunga Estate, with the best rainfall in the area, was historically famed for its breeding of Shropshire sheep and is situated south-east of Clare, towards Mintaro and its historic Martindale Hall.

== Governance ==
Clare is governed at the local level by the District Council of Clare and Gilbert Valleys. Clare lies in the state electoral district of Frome and the federal electoral Division of Grey.

== Geography ==
Clare is situated on the eponymous Clare Valley along the path of the Hutt River, about 10 km (6.2 mi) west of the Camels Hump Range and 3.5 km (2.2 mi) west of Stony Range. The Skilly Hills rise to the south-west and the Bungaree Hills rise to the north-west.

=== Climate ===
Clare has a hot-summer mediterranean climate (Köppen: Csa), with moderately hot, dry summers and cool, wetter winters. Temperatures vary throughout the year, with average maxima ranging from 30.4 °C (86.7 °F) in January to 13.0 °C (55.4 °F) in July, and average minima fluctuating between 15.0 °C (59.0 °F) in January and 4.1 °C (39.4 °F) in August. Annual precipitation is moderately low, averaging 534.5 mm (21.04 in) between 117.7 precipitation days. There are 102.7 clear days and 111.8 cloudy days annually. Extreme temperatures have ranged from 44.9 °C (112.8 °F) on 24 January 2019 to −5.0 °C (23.0 °F) on 15 June 2006. In the climate box below, temperature extremes were combined from the old Post Office (1957-1994) and current High School (1994-2024) weather stations.

Climate data for Clare (33º49'12"S, 138º35'24"E, 395 m AMSL) (1994-2024 normals, extremes 1957-2024)
Month	Jan	Feb	Mar	Apr	May	Jun	Jul	Aug	Sep	Oct	Nov	Dec	Year
Record high °C (°F)	44.9 (112.8)	43.6 (110.5)	40.4 (104.7)	36.3 (97.3)	28.7 (83.7)	24.2 (75.6)	25.0 (77.0)	27.4 (81.3)	32.2 (90.0)	35.6 (96.1)	41.1 (106.0)	44.3 (111.7)	44.9 (112.8)
Mean daily maximum °C (°F)	30.4 (86.7)	29.7 (85.5)	26.3 (79.3)	21.8 (71.2)	17.1 (62.8)	13.5 (56.3)	13.0 (55.4)	14.2 (57.6)	17.5 (63.5)	21.1 (70.0)	24.9 (76.8)	27.7 (81.9)	21.4 (70.6)
Mean daily minimum °C (°F)	15.0 (59.0)	14.7 (58.5)	12.3 (54.1)	9.0 (48.2)	6.4 (43.5)	4.8 (40.6)	4.1 (39.4)	4.4 (39.9)	6.1 (43.0)	8.0 (46.4)	10.7 (51.3)	12.7 (54.9)	9.0 (48.2)
Record low °C (°F)	2.8 (37.0)	4.9 (40.8)	1.4 (34.5)	−1.0 (30.2)	−3.7 (25.3)	−5.0 (23.0)	−4.5 (23.9)	−3.3 (26.1)	−2.3 (27.9)	−1.4 (29.5)	0.0 (32.0)	3.0 (37.4)	−5.0 (23.0)
Average precipitation mm (inches)	22.0 (0.87)	23.3 (0.92)	21.9 (0.86)	36.7 (1.44)	52.6 (2.07)	66.2 (2.61)	63.4 (2.50)	66.3 (2.61)	57.9 (2.28)	46.3 (1.82)	39.1 (1.54)	37.3 (1.47)	534.5 (21.04)
Average precipitation days (≥ 0.2 mm)	4.7	4.1	5.4	7.4	11.6	15.0	17.0	16.3	12.2	9.1	8.1	6.8	117.7
Average afternoon relative humidity (%)	28	29	34	42	56	68	69	63	58	45	36	31	47
Average dew point °C (°F)	5.9 (42.6)	6.5 (43.7)	5.8 (42.4)	5.7 (42.3)	6.5 (43.7)	6.3 (43.3)	5.8 (42.4)	5.5 (41.9)	6.4 (43.5)	5.0 (41.0)	5.2 (41.4)	4.9 (40.8)	5.8 (42.4)
Source: Bureau of Meteorology (1994-2024 normals, extremes 1957-2024)

== Notable people ==
Notable people from or who have lived in Clare include:

- William Adey, educationist
- Peter Albany Bell, caterer and philanthropist
- Hooper Brewster-Jones, pianist and composer
- Luke Dunstan, Australian rules football player
- Albert Fryar, philatelist and sportsman
- Edward Burton Gleeson, "Paddy" Gleeson, founder of Clare (1803 -1870)
- George Charles Hawker, (1818–1895), pioneer and parliamentarian (1858–1895)
- Charles Hawker, politician
- Riley Knight, Australian rules football player
- H. H. Tilbrook, co-founder of The Northern Argus, and photographer

== Demographic statistics ==
The following statistics are from the Australian Bureau of Statistics from the years provided below each statistic in various data fields.

Population Demographics
Total Population	Working age population	Aboriginal Population	Persons born overseas
4,185	57.8	92	352
(2025)	(2024)	(2021)	(2021)

Median total income	Total businesses	Number of Jobs	Median weekly rental payment
$52,976	574	3,665	$250
(2023)	(2025)	(2023)	(2021)

== See also ==
- Clare Valley
- Stanley Football Association
