= Ian Roberts (painter) =

Australian artist

Ian Roberts OAM
- Born: Blyth, South Australia
- Known for: Painting and plant propogation
- Awards: Medal of the Order of Australia; 2013
- Website: http://www.medikagallery.com.au

The superb fairywren (Malurus cyaneus) as painted by Ian Roberts

Ian Thomas Roberts is an Australian bird and native vegetation painter.

== Early life and education ==
Ian Thomas Roberts was born in Blyth, South Australia.

== From farming to painting ==
Starting from 1983, Roberts devotes most of his time to painting which was his hobby during the previous 18 farming years. His interest in the natural world explains the main focus of his paintings. He is also a book illustrator; his drawings appeared in Eucalypts of Western Australia's Wheatbelt by French Malcolm and Native Eucalypts of South Australia by Dean Nicolle.

== Community involvement ==
A third-generation Blyth dweller, Roberts is active in a local farming community in Blyth a small town located in the Clare Valley region, South Australia, 132 kilometres (82 mi) north of Adelaide. He has been a member of a District Council of Blyth, the Blyth Hospital Board, and Country Fire Service. As of 2013 he was a member of the Blyth Development Board, Blyth Cinema, Blyth Progress Association, and Blyth Town Management.

He was also the instigator of Blyth Cinema, a community based cinema opened in May 2005 in a former Masonic Hall, and became its manager.

The Blyth local and regional (community and private) solar photovoltaic power development was another of Roberts' projects, through his chairmanship of Blyth Development Board. This involved the installation of 2.7 kW of solar power on each of 7 community sporting club-rooms and over 60 private installations from 1KW to 3KW systems and took place in 2009.

Roberts was the prime mover behind the Brooks Lookout development, which was opened on 21 October 2001. This Lookout has sweeping views to 100 km across the Blyth Plains, and includes a reserve that protects valuable remnant native vegetation.

Roberts was also involved in the establishment of the Padnaindi Reserve in Blyth. The original development took place in 1984, and Roberts designed the 16 panels for the laser-cut fence surrounding the park, which were installed in 2012.

In August 2025, the 4.4-kilometre (2.7 mi) Dean Nicolle Eucalypt Walk was opened along a section of the old railway corridor. The walk is the brainchild of Roberts, who named it after renowned eucalypt scientist Dean Nicolle, with whom he had created an informal partnership, with Nicolle providing eucalypt seeds to Roberts. The trail features more than 2,000 Australian plant species, including 300 varieties of rare eucalypt, planted by volunteers between 2010 and 2019. As of September 2025, Roberts had painted around 770 of the 900 species of eucalypts.

Roberts is a co-director, with his wife Narelle, of the Medika Gallery in Blyth.

== Honours and recognition ==
In 2007, as a member of the group of Blyth's Cinema volunteers, Roberts was recognised with the inaugural regional Emu Award. In 2008 he travelled to Melbourne to accept the national Westpac Community Idol Award for the Blyth Cinema.

In 2013, Roberts received a Medal of the Order of Australia (OAM).

The author of Native Eucalypts of South Australia Dean Nicolle, director and head of research at Currency Creek Arboretum, a world-renowned eucalypt research facility, acknowledged Robert's help in producing the book, which included 97 watercolour paintings by Roberts. Nicolle wrote that Ian Roberts "not only painted and allowed reproduction of all the seedlings illustrated in this book, but also grew most of these seedlings at a community nursery at Blyth".
