= Boconnoc Park, South Australia =

Boconnoc Park South Australia
- Coordinates: 33.86°S 138.56°E
- Population: 28 (SAL 2021)
- Postcode(s): 5453
- Location: 8 km (5 mi) west of Clare
- LGA(s): District Council of Clare and Gilbert Valleys
- State electorate(s): Frome
- Federal division(s): Grey
Localities around Boconnoc Park:
	Benbournie	Armagh
Blyth	Boconnoc Park	Emu Flat
Kybunga	Spring Gully

Boconnoc Park is a locality in the Mid North region of South Australia. It is on the lower slopes on the west side of the Clare Valley. The current boundaries of the locality were set in 2001.

Boconnoc Park was a sheep station. It was bought by George Brooks in 1905 from Harry Carter, who had owned it since at least 1885. It had been in the Carter family since 1859.
