= Emu Flat, South Australia =

Emu Flat South Australia
- Coordinates: 33.86°S 138.59°E
- Population: 106 (SAL 2021)
- Postcode(s): 5453
- Location: 5 km (3 mi) west of Clare
- LGA(s): District Council of Clare and Gilbert Valleys
- State electorate(s): Frome
- Federal division(s): Grey
Localities around Emu Flat:
	Armagh
Boconnoc Park	Emu Flat	Clare
Spring Gully		Gillentown

Emu Flat is a locality in the western Clare Valley in South Australia.

In the 19th century, Emu Flat was the site of some copper mining by the Royal Mining Company and the Burra Company. The Burra Company already had a successful mine at Burra to the northeast. It had an agreement with the Royal Mining Company, but when the land was auctioned, Burra had the capacity to outbid on every lot. It could pay 20% of the purchase price, and if the land did not look good, could forfeit the deposit and land on sections it no longer wanted. The mine was not very successful, and closed around 1910.
