= Reginald Craig =

Australian cricketer

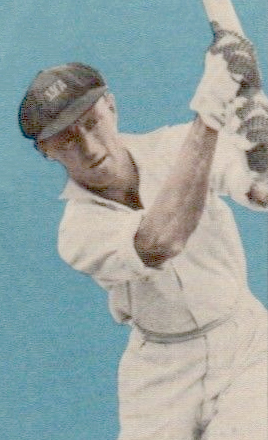
- Craig pictured in around 1948

Personal information
- Full name: Reginald Jack Craig
- Born: 3 August 1916; Adelaide, South Australia
- Died: 17 April 1985 (aged 68); Walkers Flat, South Australia
- Batting: Right-handed
- Bowling: Legbreak googly

Domestic team information
- Years: Team
- 1945/46–1951/52: South Australia

Career statistics
Competition	First-class
Matches	31
Runs scored	1,677
Batting average	30.49
100s/50s	4/6
Top score	141
Balls bowled	500
Wickets	9
Bowling average	55.55
5 wickets in innings	0
10 wickets in match	0
Best bowling	3/37
Catches/stumpings	16/1
- Source: Cricinfo, 25 February 2020

Reginald Jack Craig (3 August 1916 – 17 April 1985) was an Australian cricketer. He played thirty-one first-class matches for South Australia between 1945/46 and 1950/51.
