= Clare and Gilbert Valleys Council =

Coordinates: 33°49′59″S 138°37′01″E

- Local government area
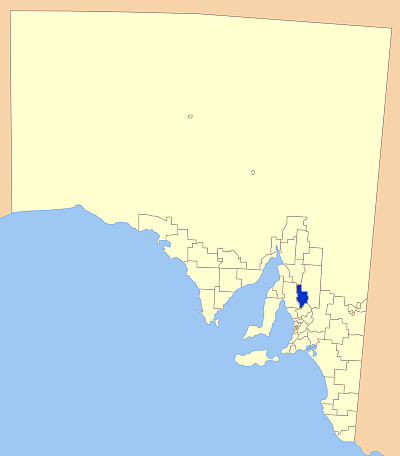
- Location of Clare and Gilbert Valleys Council
- Interactive map of Clare and Gilbert Valleys Council
- Country: Australia
- State: South Australia
- Region: Yorke and Mid North
- Established: 1997
- Council seat: Clare

Government
  - Mayor: Allan Aughey
  - State electorate: Frome, Goyder
  - Federal division: Grey

Area
  - Total: 1,840 km^{2} (710 sq mi)

Population
  - Total: 9,187 (LGA 2021)
  - Density: 5/km^{2} (13/sq mi)
- Website: Clare and Gilbert Valleys Council
LGAs around Clare and Gilbert Valleys Council
	Northern Areas
Wakefield	Clare and Gilbert Valleys Council	Goyder
	Light

The Clare and Gilbert Valleys Council is a local government area located in the Yorke and Mid North region of South Australia. The council was founded on 1 July 1997 with the amalgamation of the District Council of Clare, the District Council of Riverton and the District Council of Saddleworth and Auburn. The council seat is located at Clare; it also maintains branch offices at Riverton and Saddleworth.

== Geography ==
It includes the towns and localities of Anama, Armagh, Auburn, Barinia, Benbournie, Black Springs, Bungaree, Boconnoc Park, Clare, Emu Flat, Giles Corner, Gillentown, Hill River, Hilltown, Leasingham, Manoora, Marrabel, Mintaro, Penwortham, Polish Hill River, Rhynie, Riverton, Saddleworth, Sevenhill, Spring Farm, Spring Gully, Stanley, Stanley Flat, Steelton, Stockport, Tarlee, Tarnma, Tothill Belt, Tothill Creek, Undalya, Waterloo, Watervale and Woolshed Flat, and parts of Alma, Farrell Flat, Halbury, Hoyleton and Salter Springs.

== Council ==
The Clare and Gilbert Valleys Council has a directly elected mayor.

=== 2022 election results ===
2022 South Australian local elections: Clare and Gilbert Valleys
Party	Candidate	Votes	%	±%
Independent	David Willson (elected)	548	17.0	
Independent	Ann Alder (elected)	449	13.9	
Independent	Ian Burfitt (elected)	369	11.4	
Independent Liberal	Malcolm Bartholomaeus (elected)	356	11.0	
Independent	Leon Bruhn (elected)	336	10.4	
Independent Liberal	Tania Furler (elected)	319	9.9	
Independent	Elizabeth Calvert (elected)	260	8.0	
Independent Liberal	Brian Koch (elected)	236	7.3	
Independent	Jeannine Naughton (elected)	197	6.1	
Independent	Owen Perry	162	5.0	
Total formal votes		3,232	96.3	
Informal votes		123	3.7	
Turnout		3,355	48.3	+4.7

== See also ==
- Clare Valley
- Gilbert River
- List of parks and gardens in rural South Australia
