= Kybunga, South Australia =

Kybunga
- Town
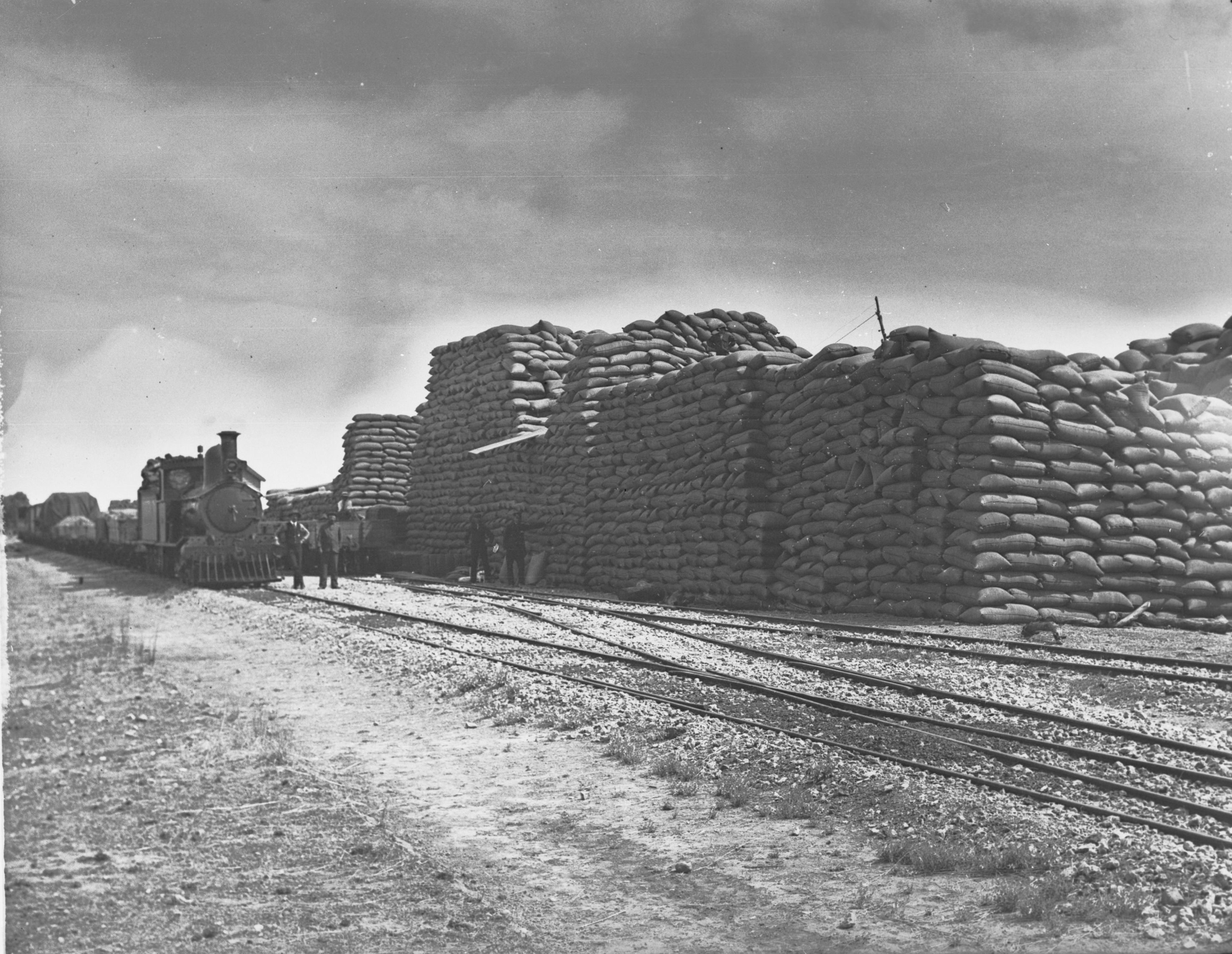
- Wheat stacks at Kybunga, ca. 1920

- Coordinates: 33.921710°S 138.505030°E
- Country: Australia
- State: South Australia
- LGA: Wakefield Regional Council
- Location: 11 km (6.8 mi) south of Blyth; 17 km (11 mi) southwest of Clare; 30 km (19 mi) northeast of Balaklava; 126 km (78 mi) north of Adelaide

Government
  - State electorate: Frome
  - Federal division: Grey
- Elevation: 192 m (630 ft)

Population
  - Total: 69 (SAL 2021)
- Postcode: 5453
Localities around Kybunga
	Blyth	Boconnoc Park
Bowillia	Kybunga	Spring Gully
Stow	Hoyleton	Watervale

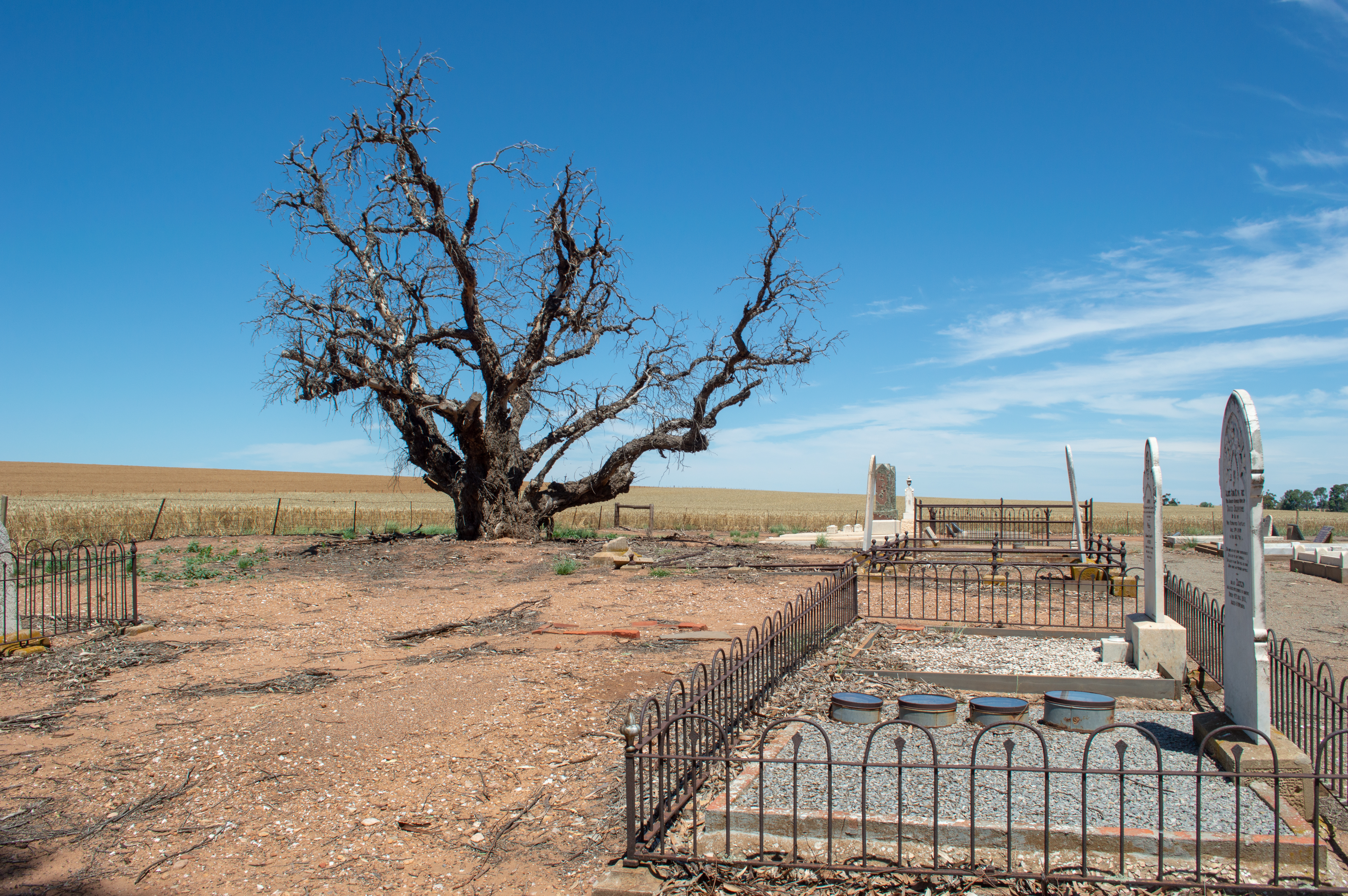
Cemetery

Kybunga is a locality in the Mid North of South Australia. It was on the Gladstone railway line 87 1/2 miles (140.8 km) north of Adelaide on the plains to the west of the Clare Valley. The Kybunga school opened in 1881 and closed in 1988, and the former Methodist and Uniting church that opened in 1886 is now a private residence.
