= Spring Gully Conservation Park =

Protected area in South Australia

- IUCN category III (natural monument or feature)
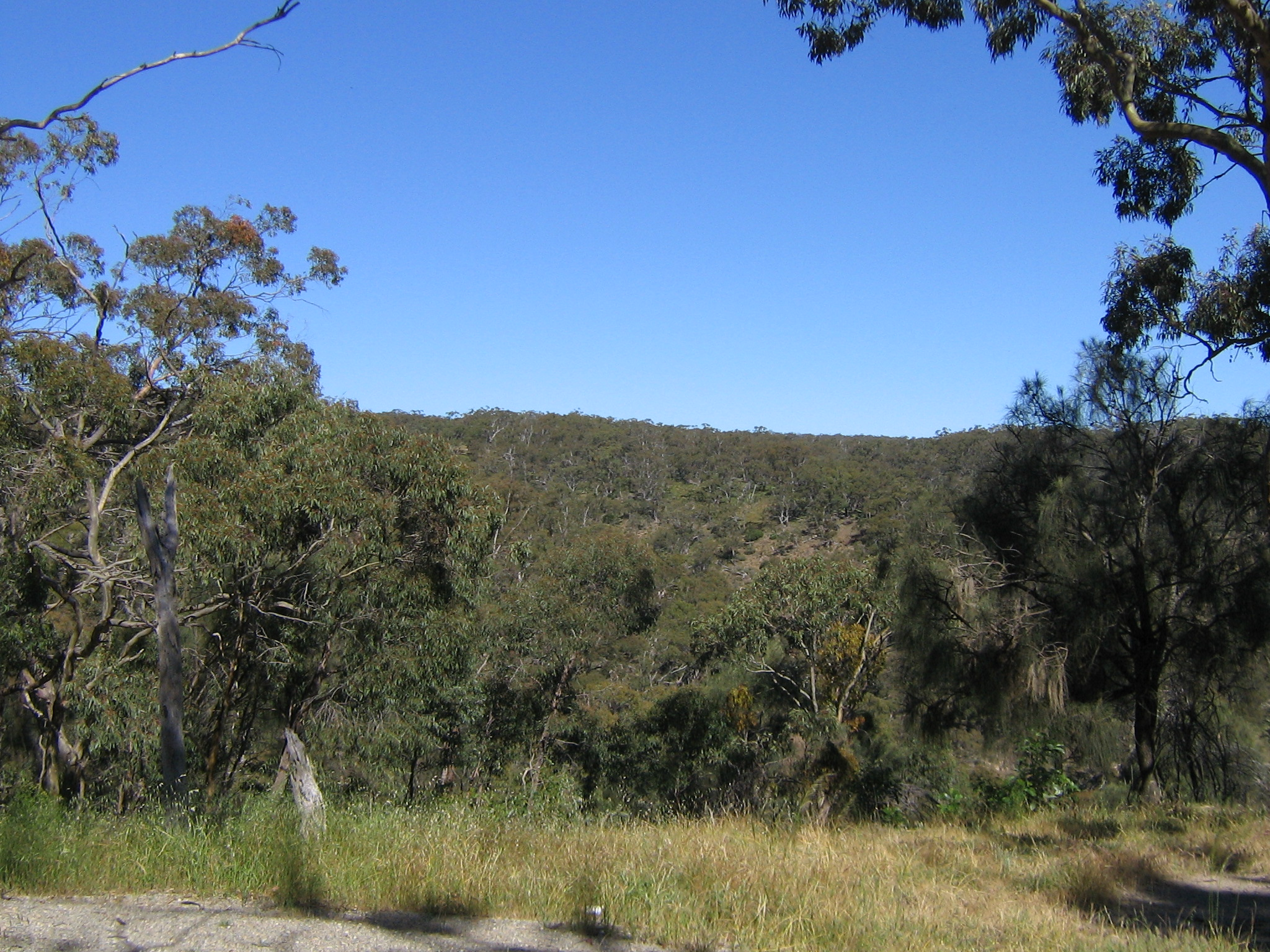
- Red stringybark woodland in Spring Gully CP

- Location within South Australia
- Location: South Australia, Sevenhills & Spring Gully
- Nearest city: Clare
- Coordinates: 33°54′40.32″S 138°35′43.44″E
- Area: 3.96 km^{2} (1.53 sq mi)
- Established: 12 January 1961
- Governing body: Department for Environment and Water
- Website: Official website

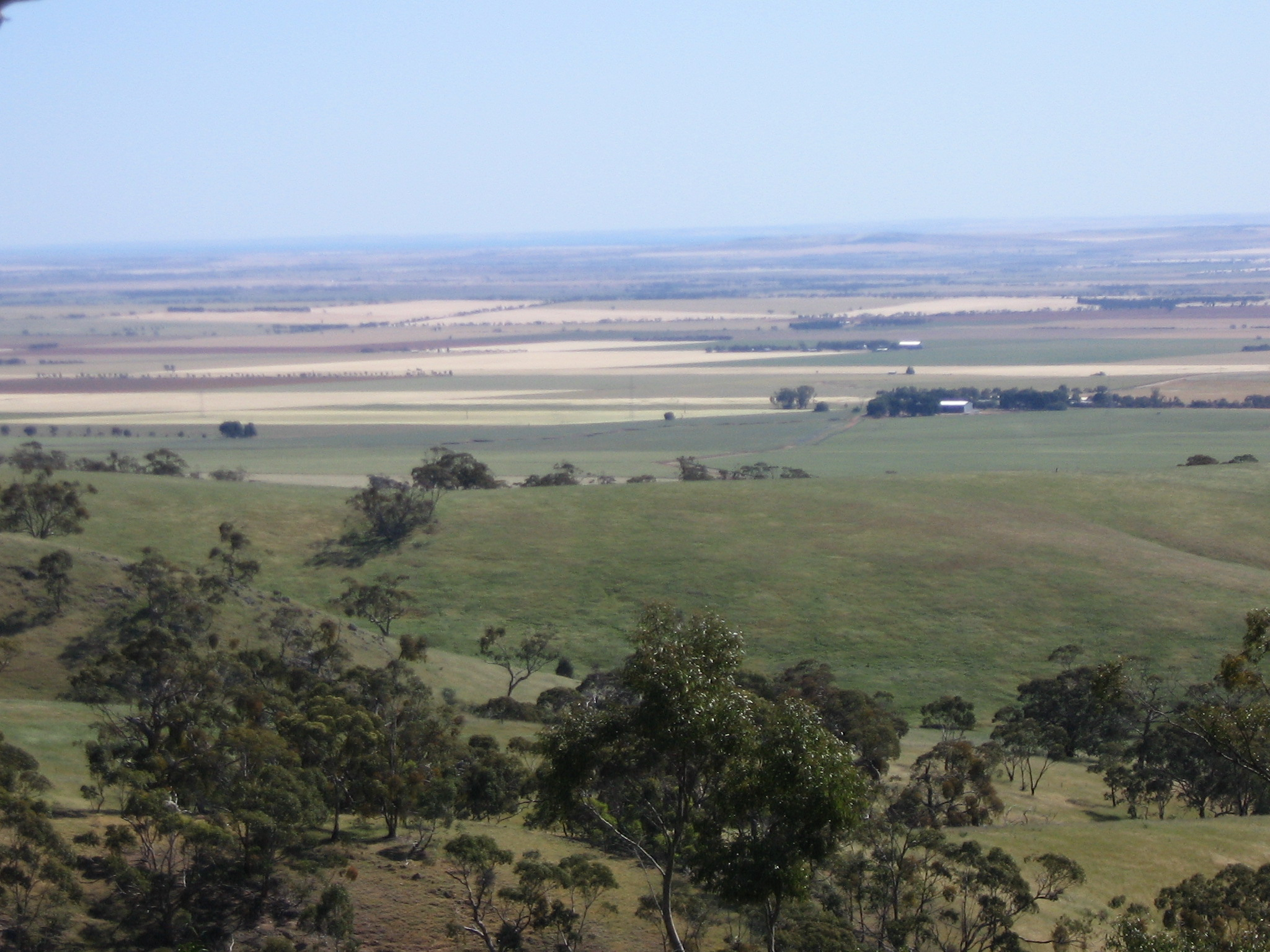
View to the west from Spring Gully CP

Spring Gully Conservation Park, (formerly Spring Gully National Park), is a protected area located in the Australian state of South Australia in the localities of Sevenhills and Spring Gully about 6 kilometres (3.7 mi) south of the town centre in Clare.

The conservation park consists of land in sections 142, 365, 568 and 572 in the cadastral unit of the Hundred of Clare. Section 568 was proclaimed on 12 January 1961 as a wildlife reserve under the Crown Lands Act 1929. Section 572 was dedicated as a wildlife reserve on 20 January 1966. On 9 November 1967, land in sections 568 and 572 was proclaimed under the National Parks Act 1966 as Spring Gully National Park. Section 365 was added to the national park on 21 March 1968. On 27 April 1972, land in sections 365, 568 and 572 was proclaimed as Spring Gully Conservation Park. Section 142 was added to the conservation park on 9 September 1976. As of 2018, it covered an area of 3.96 square kilometres (1.53 sq mi).

In 1980, the conservation park was described as follows:

This park preserves the only stand of red stringybark (Eucalyptus macrorhyncha) in South Australia. It is a relic population left behind from a wetter time, the nearest populations occurring near Dubbo in New South Wales and Cape Otway in Victoria. Fine views over the plains to the west can be seen from this park which is used by locals as a picnic area…

Spring Gully is situated on a western ridge of the northern Mount Lofty Ranges, approximately 15km south of Clare. It has an open forest association dominated by Eucalyptus macrorhyncha on its upper slopes, particularly in the northern portion and has been cleared in its southern portion. Blackboys (Xanthorrhoea sp.) occur in the more open areas. Western grey kangaroos and euros occur in the ranges here…

Approximately a quarter of the park is cleared land…

The flora of the conservation park includes Caladenia argocalla (white beauty spider orchid), a species listed both nationally and at state level as "endangered".

Thousands of the red stringybark trees died following the very dry period from mid-2007 to early 2008 and the record heat-wave of March 2008. The leaves of others died, while the trees survived and later produced epicormic shoots; as of mid-2009 many of these had also died. An apparently small section of the conservation park (20ha) was burned in a lightning-ignited bushfire on 20 November 2009, further stressing some of the trees.

A portion of the Riesling Trail known as the Spring Gully Loop passes along the northern side of the conservation park.

The conservation park is classified as an IUCN Category III protected area. In 1980, it was listed on the now-defunct Register of the National Estate.

== See also ==
- Protected areas of South Australia
