= Bungaree, South Australia =

Bungaree
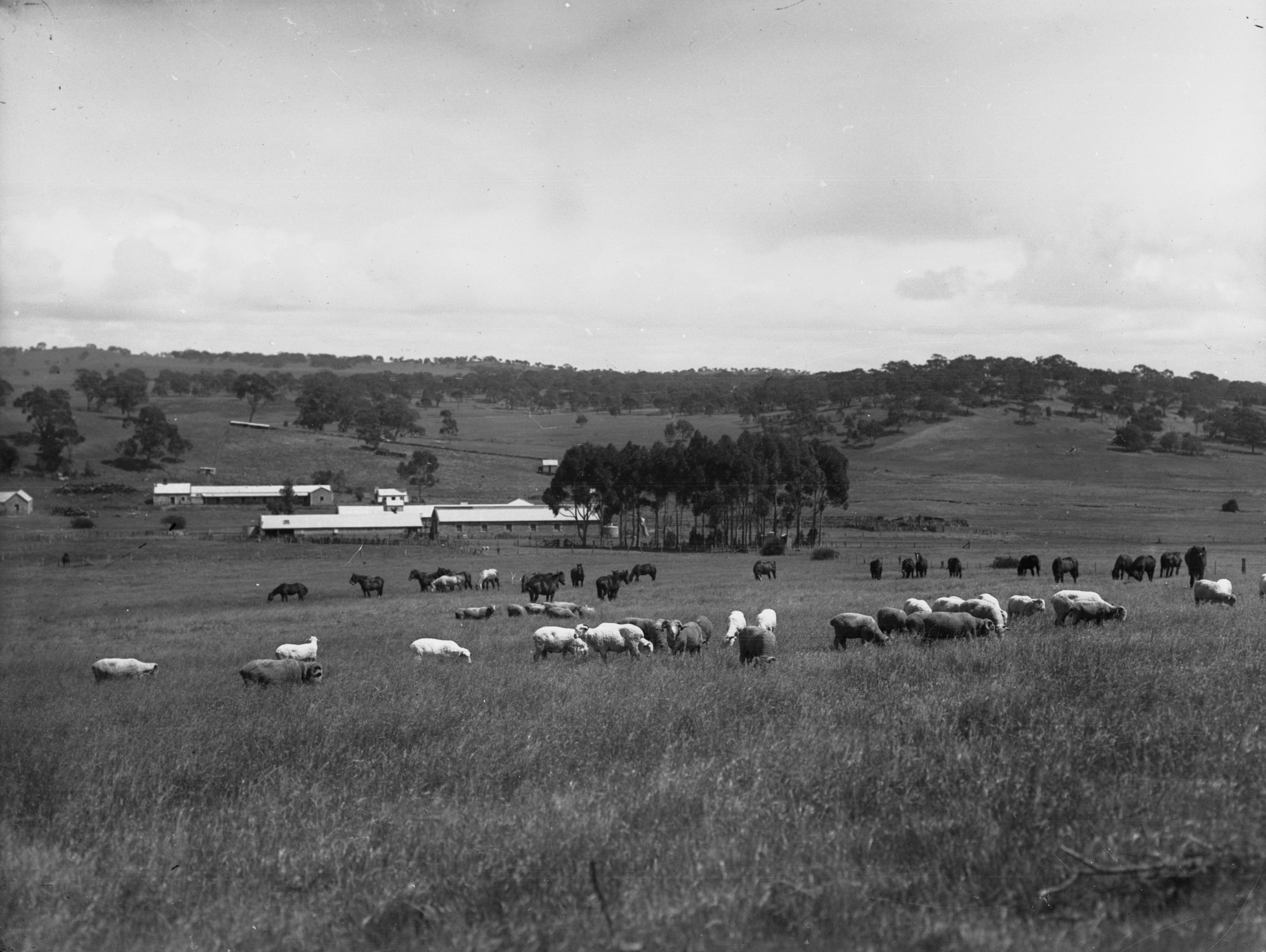
- Sheep Station at Bungaree, ca. 1925

- Coordinates: 33°44′39″S 138°33′39″E
- Country: Australia
- State: South Australia
- Region: Mid North
- LGA: District Council of Clare and Gilbert Valleys
- Location: 131 km (81 mi) north of Adelaide; 12 km (7.5 mi) north of Clare
- Established: 1841

Government
  - Mayor: Allan Aughey
  - State electorate: Frome
  - Federal division: Grey

Population
  - Total: 23 (SAL 2021)
- Postcode: 5464

Bungaree (or Bungaree Station) is a locality in the Mid North of South Australia, situated north of Clare, along the Main North Road.

== History ==
Bungaree Station was established by English settler James Collins Hawker, along with his two brothers George Charles Hawker and Charles Hawker, in 1841. The former had discovered a good supply of water there on 22 December 1841, so they sank a well and transferred all their livestock from their failed settlement at Nuriootpa, subsequently running sheep on 80,000 acres (32,000 ha) of purchased land. Over time, a large settlement evolved that included the main homestead and a number of outbuildings, including a church.

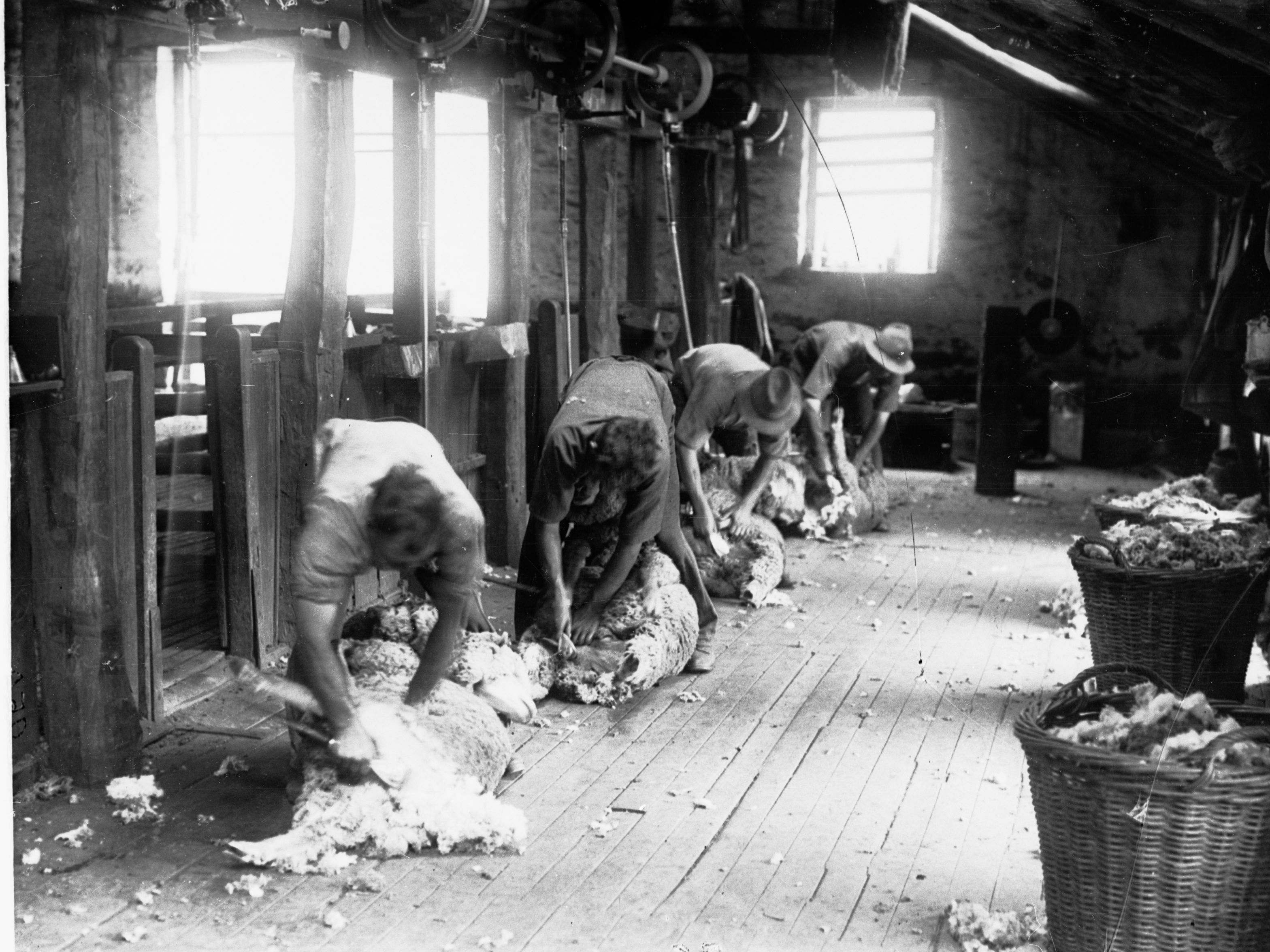
Men in shearing shed shearing sheep, Bungaree, 1925

The historic Bungaree Homestead Complex, including the homestead and its manager's house, council chamber, stables, office and store, men's kitchen, shearing shed, shearers' quarters, swagman's hut, stallion box and gate house, is listed on the South Australian Heritage Register.

== The settlement today ==
Bungaree is still an active sheep station and remains in the ownership of the Hawker family. It has also become a centre for tourism, with accommodation and a conference centre.

== Governance ==
Bungaree is located within the District Council of Clare and Gilbert Valleys, the state electoral district of Frome and the federal electoral division of Grey.
