= Hill River, South Australia =

Hill River South Australia
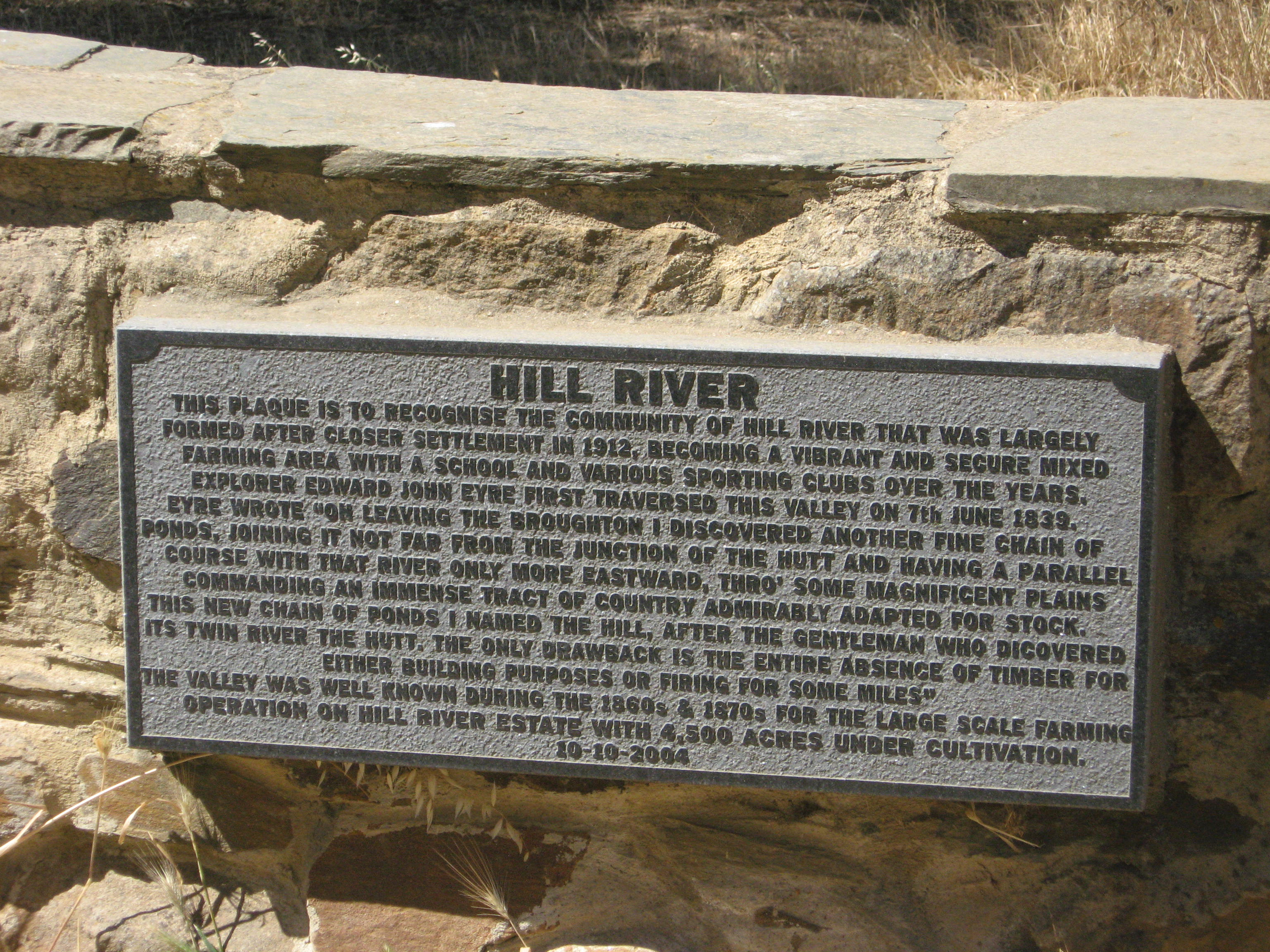
- HILL RIVER plaque at junction of Weckerts Road and Clare-Farrell Flat Road, South Australia

- Coordinates: 33.805730°S 138.687090°E
- Population: 98 (SAL 2021)
- Established: 2001
- Postcode(s): 5453
- Time zone: ACST (UTC+9:30)
  - Summer (DST): ACST (UTC+10:30)
- Location: 127 km (79 mi) N of Adelaide city centre
- LGA(s): Clare and Gilbert Valleys
- Region: Yorke and Mid North
- State electorate(s): Frome
- Federal division(s): Grey
Mean max temp	Mean min temp	Annual rainfall
21.3 °C; 70 °F	9.0 °C; 48 °F	541.9 mm 21.3 in
Localities around Hill River:
Barinia	Hilltown	Gum Creek
Stanley Flat; Spring Farm; Clare	Hill River	Gum Creek; Farrell Flat
Sevenhill	Polish Hill River; Stanley	Stanley
- Footnotes: Coordinates; Climate

Hill River is a locality in the Yorke and Mid North region of South Australia, about 127 kilometres (79 miles) north of the Adelaide city centre. It is bisected by the Hill River, an ephemeral stream from which it derives its name. Its boundaries were created in January 2001 for the “long established name.”

Hill River is located within the federal division of Grey, the state electoral district of Frome and the local government area of the District Council of Clare and Gilbert Valleys.

== History ==
Prior to European settlement it was the traditional home of the Ngadjuri people. The first European explorer to discover the Hill River area was Edward John Eyre on 5 June 1839. He named the river after explorer John Hill because he was "the gentleman who discovered its twin river, the Hutt". Eyre described the area as "a fine chain of ponds taking its course through a very extensive and grassy valley, but with little timber of any kind growing near it."

The first pastoralist of Hill River was Charles Campbell (1811–59), an overlander who established a sheep run there in 1842 in connection with Henry Strong Price (1825–89). He took out an occupation licence in January 1843. Their resident stock-keeper was William Roach.

In 1844 overlander William Robinson (1814–1889) established Hill River Station along the upper reaches of the waterway, near Clare. The artist S.T. Gill visited in 1846 as part of the ill-fated Horrocks expedition. Gill prepared several watercolours of the thriving homestead, which was at that time perhaps the most advanced pastoral establishment in the Mid North.

Hill River Station went on to become one of the great South Australian pastoral properties of the 1800s, being subsequently owned 1855–76 by C.B. Fisher and then by John Howard Angas, setting numerous records for its production of wool and sheep.

A 1600mm gauge railway line, the Spalding railway line, which closed in 1984 and is now removed, ran as a spur line from Clare, through the Hill River valley, parallel to the river, with stations at Barinia, Hilltown, Andrews and Spalding (the terminus).

== See also ==
- List of cities and towns in South Australia
