= Clare Valley wine region =

Australian wine region

Coordinates: 33°53′S 138°36′E

Clare Valley
- Wine region
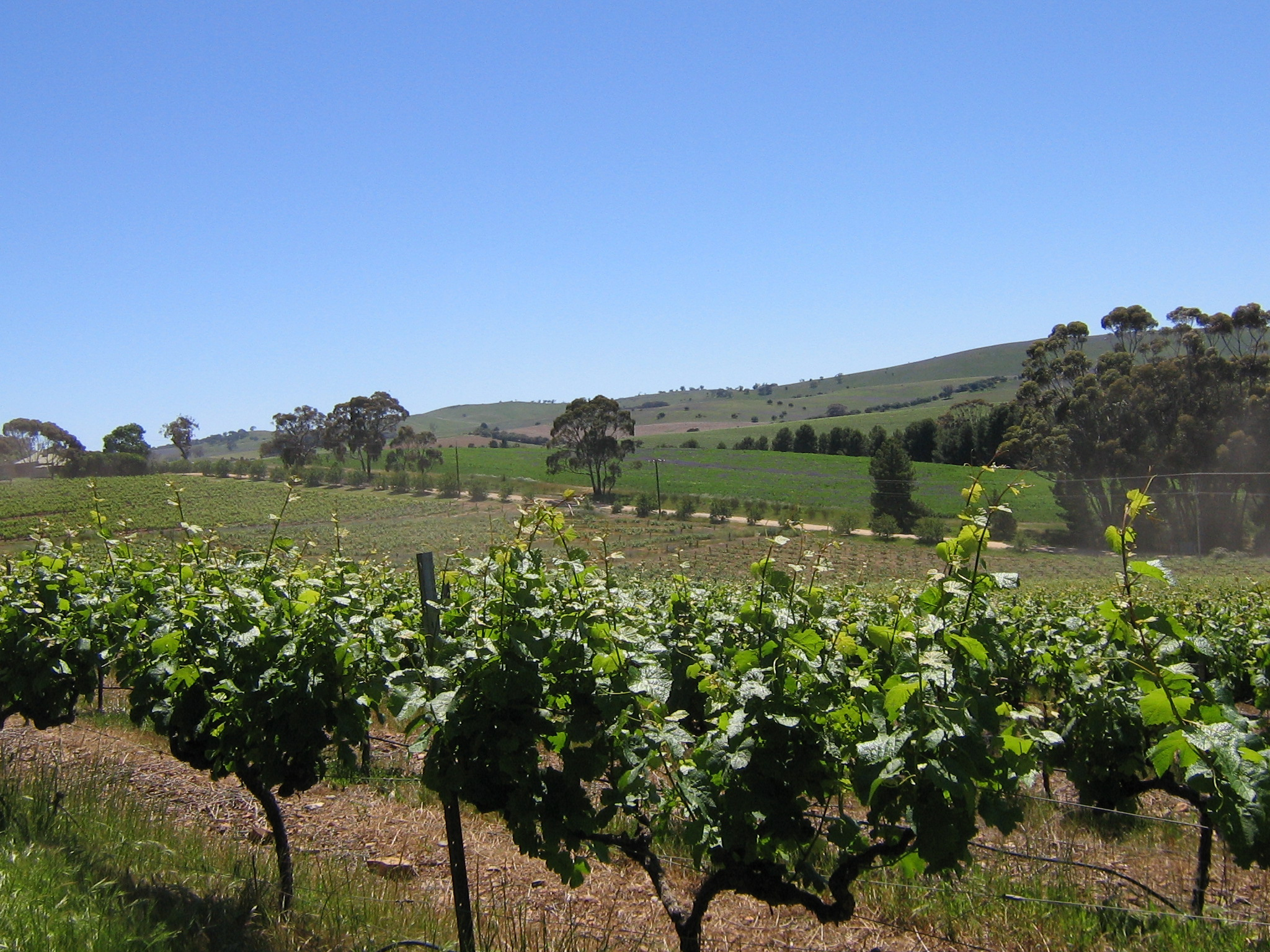
- Vineyards in Clare Valley
- Type: Australian Geographical Indication
- Year established: 1999
- Country: Australia
- Part of: Mount Lofty Ranges zone
- Sub-regions: Informal: Auburn; Clare; Polish Hill River; Sevenhill; Watervale
- Climate region: ’I’
- Heat units: 1770
- Precipitation (annual average): 200 mm (7.9 in)
- Size of planted vineyards: 5,339 ha (13,190 acres)
- No. of vineyards: at least 200 growers
- Grapes produced: 19,796 tonnes (19,483 long tons; 21,821 short tons)
- Varietals produced: Shiraz, Cabernet Sauvignon, Riesling, Merlot
- No. of wineries: at least 48
- Comments: 2012 & 2014

The Clare Valley wine region is one of Australia's oldest wine regions, best known for Riesling wines. It lies in the Mid North of South Australia, approximately 142 km north of Adelaide. The valley runs north-south, with Horrocks Highway as the main thoroughfare.

== Extent and appellation ==
Clare Valley wine region covers an area adjoining the both sides of the Horrocks Highway as it passes through the town of Clare near its northern extent and the town of Auburn near its southern extent. The region is located at the northern end of the Mount Lofty Ranges zone with its southern extent being about 100 kilometres (62 miles) north of the Adelaide city centre. The Clare Valley wine region was registered as an Australian Geographical Indication on 25 March 1999.

== Soil and climate ==
The wines are planted from 400 to 500 metres (1,300 to 1,600 ft). The climate is moderately continental, with cool to cold nights and warm to hot summer days. The higher altitude, compared to other wine regions in South Australia, ensures cool nights even during the heat of summer allowing the fruit to ripen more evenly and slowly. Rainfall is predominantly in winter – spring (June – September) with an annual average of around 630 mm. Summers are dry and make irrigation desirable but also ensure a minimum of fungal diseases. Varied soil types throughout the valleys are another feature, ranging from red to brown grey over basement rock.

== Grape varieties ==
The most important white variety is Riesling, with the Clare Valley regarded as its Australian home. Principal red varieties are Cabernet Sauvignon and Shiraz. They make a range of styles of varietal wines, reflecting different approaches to winemaking as well as the influences of the various sub-regions and micro-climates in the valleys. Many other lesser varieties are also grown, including Chardonnay, Semillion, Sauvignon Blanc, Pinot Noir, Tempranillo and Grenache. The Clare Valley Region contributes around 2% of the Australian national grape crush, but wins over 7% of all medals awarded for Australian wine.

As of 2014, the most common plantings in the Clare Valley wine region within a total planted area of 5,339 ha (13,190 acres) was reported as being Shiraz (34.9%) followed by Cabernet Sauvignon (22.3%), Riesling (21.8%) and Merlot (5.4%). Alternatively, red wine varietals account for 68.2% of plantings while white wines varietals account for 31.4% of plantings. The 2014 vintage is reported as consisting of 11,921 tonnes (11,733 long tons; 13,141 short tons) of red grapes crushed valued at A$14,235,653 and 7,875 tonnes (7,751 long tons; 8,681 short tons) of white grapes crushed valued at $7,451,398.

== Regional facts ==
The region has more than 48 wineries, most of which are small and produce only bottled wine.

- Area planted: 5,339 ha (13,190 acres)
- Annual production: 2014: 19,796 tonnes (19,483 long tons; 21,821 short tons)

The Clare Valley Wine Region does not have any legally defined subregions. It is sometimes informally divided into five subregions named for the towns in those growing areas: Auburn, Clare, Polish Hill River, Sevenhill and Watervale.

== Population ==
Town Populations:

Rank	Urban Centre	2016 Census	Reference
1	Clare	3,327	
2	Auburn	661	
3	Stanley Flat	421	
4	Armagh	362	
5	Watervale	326	
6	Mintaro	188	
7	Penwortham	147	
8	Sevenhill	120	
9	Leasingham	119	
10	Polish Hill River	36	
11	Undalya	29	

As a rural region, there are also population pockets outside of the town centres (not shown here).

== See also ==
- Australian wine
- South Australian wine

== Citations and references ==
=== References ===
- Halliday, James (23 October 2012), James Halliday Australian wine companion : the bestselling and definitive guide to Australian wine (2013 ed.), Richmond, Vic. Hardie Grant Books (published 2012), ISBN 978-1-74270-306-0
- Phylloxera and Grape Industry Board of SA (PGIBSA) (2014), Australian regional winegrape crush survey online (PDF), Phylloxera and Grape Industry Board of SA, ISSN 1442-6048, archived from the original (PDF) on 6 November 2014
