= Thomas Burr =

Australian explorer (1813–1866)

Thomas Burr (1813–1866), surveyor and mine manager, was a British explorer and Deputy Surveyor General of South Australia 1839–46.

== Early life in England ==
Born 1813 in England, probably at Kent, Thomas Burr's father was George Dominicus Burr (1786–1855), an esteemed Professor of Mathematics at Sandhurst military college for forty years, 1813–53.

Burr embarked on survey and landscape studies under his father, who also taught military surveying. He began survey work in about 1829, subsequently being employed as a civil engineer in London. During that time he married and began a family. Burr was engaged upon surveys under the Tithe Commutation Act 1836 when, upon the recommendation of E.C. Frome, who had been appointed Surveyor General of South Australia a few weeks earlier, he was appointed to the post of Deputy Surveyor General of South Australia.

== Deputy Surveyor General of South Australia ==
Burr took office at London on 29 June 1839, sailing with his family aboard the barque Cleveland on 24 July, but did not reach Port Adelaide until 18 December 1839 to begin active duty. Upon arrival Burr found he had a rival. Locally, Governor George Gawler had appointed B. T. Finniss to the same post on 15 September 1839, while Burr was still on the high seas. Gawler decided that for the time being the two men would share the post – there was plenty of survey work to be done in the nascent colony. One urgent survey task undertaken by Burr was the fixing of posts defining the street corners and footways of Adelaide.

Burr's initiation into exploration came about just four months after arriving in Australia. In April 1840 26-year-old Burr accompanied Governor Gawler and explorer John Hill on the first land-based European exploration of the east coast of Eyre Peninsula, travelling from Port Lincoln, past Franklin Harbour (Cowell), to near Whyalla. Upon Gawler's instruction, Burr's task was to prepare the related notes and charts. Along the way Gawler named a headland Cape Burr in his honour.

Burr was then detailed by Gawler to accompany the experienced John Hill in the cutter Water Witch to Northern Yorke Peninsula. The pair then carried out further exploration on their homeward journey to Adelaide, being the first Europeans to traverse this region, discovering extensive fertile land. Again, Burr prepared the related charts.

In April 1842 Burr accompanied Governor George Grey on a 14-day examination of the country around Wellington, Lake Albert and the Coorong, again preparing charts. Captain Frome was originally due to accompany the Governor but was prevented from going by ill health.

Burr had a sad return – his one-year-old daughter Elizabeth died on 1 May. The Burr family's original residence was at Meadows, but they subsequently established Grove Cottage on fifty acres of fertile land beside First Creek at what is today's Adelaide scenic suburb of Hazelwood Park. There they had an abundant garden plus an orchard of choice fruit trees.

== Discovery of the Willochra Plain and Southern Flinders Regions ==
Burr's greatest exploration discovery came almost by accident. In September 1842 various parties were out in search of a five-man cattle overlanding party led by C.C. Dutton which went missing somewhere around Whyalla or Port Augusta, presumably massacred by the Aboriginals of that region.

Burr was returning to Adelaide from this ineffectual search when, taking one of the men with him, he decided to leave the coast to cross eastward over the rugged Southern Flinders Ranges. In 1840 Eyre had sighted and named the distant and towering Mount Remarkable from near Crystal Brook, but did not venture in that direction, remaining on the western (coastal) side of the Flinders Ranges, and so missed what Burr discovered.

Crossing to the eastern side of the ranges, Burr found that they overlooked extensive 'well-wooded and watered country', now called the Willochra Plain, stretching from Melrose northward toward Quorn, east toward Orroroo, and south toward Laura. He then discovered the fine grazing country eastward of the Campbell Range, around present Jamestown and Yongala. Burr's encouraging reports of his discoveries in this vast region immediately led to the arrival of European pastoralists.

== Other expeditions and activities ==
In November 1843 Burr discovered a 'splendid' lode of copper on Government land in the Mount Lofty Ranges near Adelaide. Sold by public auction, this became the Montacute Copper Mine.

In April–May 1844 Governor Grey led an overland party to closely explore and map the South East of South Australia, today named the Limestone Coast. It was then known only from the reports of livestock overlanders. This party, of which Burr was effectively deputy leader, named various geographical features. Among these, Grey honoured Burr by naming a summit Mount Burr after his father, Professor George Dominicus Burr.

At Grey's direction, Burr's detailed journal was published in newspapers, as well as by the Royal Geographical Society. Burr's map of the district was reproduced by John Arrowsmith.

By now highly regarded, Burr developed strong theories on the physical geography of the unknown inland of Australia, particularly the potential for an inland sea, lecturing and writing on this topic. When in August 1844 Charles Sturt assembled his Central Australian Expedition he endeavoured to obtain Burr's services as draughtsman. This request having been refused by Frome (who himself had been denied the role of leading what became Sturt's expedition), Sturt then engaged McDouall Stuart, without authority.

In January 1846 Burr accompanied Governor Robe and Thomas Lipson in the Lapwing to Guichen Bay to examine that coast with a view to establishing a port, leading to the foundation of Robe.

Throughout his expeditions Burr keenly observed the colony's geology, his Remarks on the Geology and Mineralogy of South Australia being published at Adelaide in 1846, this being the colony's first official government geological report and the first geological book to be published in Australia.

== General manager, Burra Mine, South Australia ==
In August 1847 Burr was persuaded to resign from government service to accept the office of General Superintendent of the Burra copper mine, being also immediately appointed a local magistrate. Within a year there were acrimonious disagreements with interfering shareholders and directors over Burr's handling of assaying and managerial duties. Burr's dismissal in September 1848 resulted in his launching successful civil litigation against the directors, gaining substantial damages.

Burr then went into private practice as a land agent and surveyor. In 1849 he was joined by civil engineer Frederick Sinnett, later to become Burr's son-in-law. Their commissions included a trigonometrical survey of rugged Wilpena Station in 1850 for brothers William Browne and John Browne. They also laid out the town of Truro for J.H. Angas.

In 1850 Burr speculated in the purchase of acreage in the Clare Valley. He surveyed this into allotments in 1851, mainly through the influence of Jesuit priest Aloysius Kranewitter. Burr's easy lease terms led to this becoming the township of Sevenhill.

== Ballarat and the Eureka Rebellion ==
Burr's wife Frances died in December 1852. The following year, 1853, the Victorian gold rush caused depression in the South Australian economy. Seeking fresh opportunities, forty-year-old Burr decided to sell up and move to the Ballarat goldfields. He auctioned his First Creek residence and estate, Grove Cottage, plus a 76-acre farm at Sevenhill, described as 'Penwortham', on 4 February 1853. The Grove Cottage estate, located on modern-day Greenhill Road, was purchased by the Clark family who renamed it Hazelwood Park.

At Ballarat Burr was appointed as the District Surveyor, surveying government land for sale. He had held this position for around fifteen months by the time the Eureka Rebellion broke out, then having surveyed some 130 square miles. Nearly uniquely among government officials, he was present during the whole of the riots, boldly attending all the mass meetings of diggers in November 1854, at one of which there was a threat he could be shot as a spy. Burr gave evidence at subsequent criminal trials of the rioters, as well as before a Royal Commission.

== Crown Lands Office, Victoria ==
Following the Eureka riots Burr continued to undertake survey work at Ballarat and other goldfields, while remarrying at Castlemaine in 1857 to widow Isabella Gillis, nee Rough. That same year, Burr's eldest daughter Jane married in Melbourne to his former partner Frederick Sinnett.

Burr moved to Melbourne soon afterward, where he was employed as a draughtsman at the Crown Lands Office. He also continued to hold himself out as a civil engineer, although there are no known assignments.

In February 1860 he put himself forward to the Exploration Committee as a candidate to lead the expedition subsequently known as the Burke and Wills expedition. Unsurprisingly, the application failed. By then his reputation was flagging. He was already on the verge of insolvency and was known to be engaging in 'very intemperate habits', which included 'the habit of taking large doses of opium'.

In 1863 his wife died. Dogged by illness, debt, and death in the family, he lost his employment with the Crown Lands Office in 1864. In April 1866 Burr was declared insolvent.

Burr died suddenly of a heart attack on 25 September 1866 in Flagstaff Gardens Reserve, West Melbourne, Victoria. Aged 53 years, he had married only one week earlier to Ann Newton, nee Spence. This was probably his third wife, but was reported to be his fourth. His son-in-law Frederick Sinnett died at Kew eight weeks later, aged 36, of tuberculosis.

== Legacy ==
Despite his ignominious end, for many years Burr was an influential contributor to expanding the geographical and geological knowledge of the emerging colony of South Australia. His evidence concerning the Eureka rebellion provides a distinct perspective outside that of the combatants, whether diggers or military/police.
