= John Jackson Oakden =

Pastoralist, explorer, runholder

John Jackson Oakden (1818 – 31 March 1884), pastoralist, was an English explorer of South Australia, part of the European exploration of Australia, and a pioneer runholder of the Canterbury region of New Zealand.

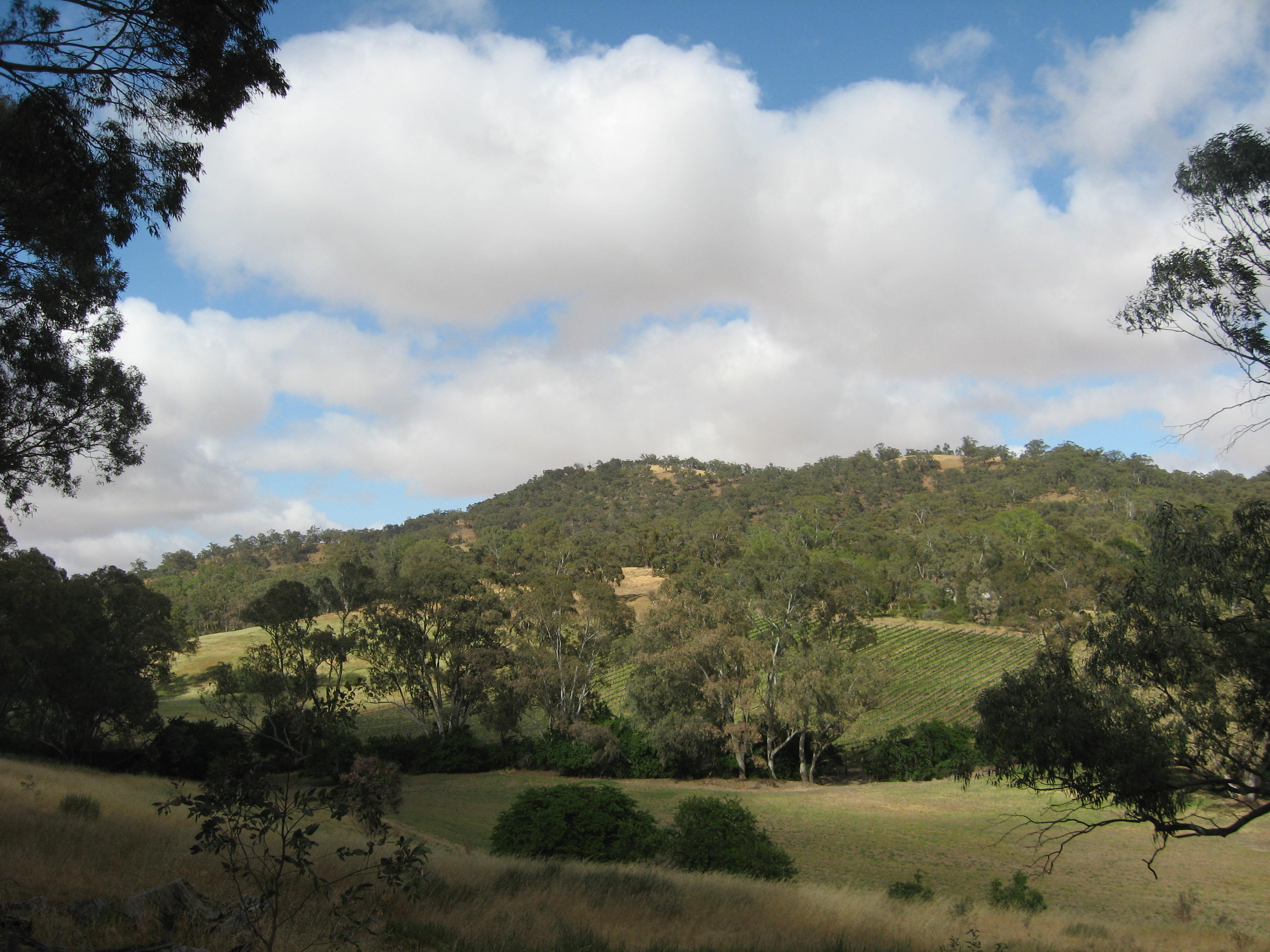
Mount Oakden near Penwortham, South Australia. View of the eastern face.

== Early life ==
Born in 1818 at Yeaveley, Derbyshire, England, Oakden was a son of Daniel Oakden, yeoman farmer, of ancient Bentley Hall at Hungry Bentley. He arrived in Australia in 1834 as a commercial cadet to his uncle, the banker and pastoralist Philip Oakden (1784–1851), of Launceston, Tasmania. Through a paternal aunt, Patience Gilles, née Oakden, after whom the Adelaide suburb of Oakden was named in 1993, he was also a nephew of Osmond Gilles, first Colonial Treasurer of South Australia. After visiting England, Oakden returned to Australia aboard the John Renwick, arriving at Adelaide in February 1837 as Philip Oakden's South Australian agent. Osmond Gilles, who was widowed and childless, thereafter placed Oakden under his patronage. Oakden travelled to Launceston in January 1838 for the purpose of importing livestock to the new colony.

== Murray River expedition ==
In March 1838, four young men in their twenties, John Hill (c.1810–1860), William Wood (1813–1885), Charles Willis (1815–1886), and John Oakden (1818–1884) – livestock importers from the eastern colonies – formed an exploration party in Adelaide. Their intention was to be the first to bring livestock overland from New South Wales to South Australia, following the Murray River, (Note: Officially the River Murray in South Australia, as per Government of South Australia stipulation of nomenclature when referring to the two major rivers of the state, the River Murray and River Torrens.) for which purpose they sought to find a practicable route through the Mount Lofty Ranges between the Murray River and Adelaide. Travelling on horseback with packhorses, after leaving Adelaide they first traversed the Barossa Valley, finding and naming Cockatoo Valley. Continuing northeast past Nuriootpa to near Eudunda, they probably sighted and named the Light River along the journey. On reaching the Murray near present Morgan, they were the first Europeans to visit the Riverland region, whether from Adelaide or from the eastern colonies, since Charles Sturt's open boat expedition in 1830. Oakden's report of this expedition was published in newspapers around Australia.

In 1839–1840 Oakden was Second Clerk in the Treasury, under his uncle Osmond Gilles. In February 1839 Oakden was part of a syndicate of six, led by William Finke (First Treasury Clerk), and including Osmond Gilles, which won the right to purchase the original town of Glenelg at £1 per acre, though Oakden failed to turn this to maximum financial advantage.

== Kadlunga, South Australia ==
In 1839 Osmond Gilles was part of a syndicate of nine investors that established the Hutt River Special Survey in the Clare Valley. As a result, around 1841 Oakden relinquished town life to take up managing sheep grazing properties in that locality. Among these was Kadlunga (also spelt Cadlunga, Tadlunga and Katalunga in earliest times), held under an occupation licence by James Stein. Kadlunga, beside Mount Horrocks and near Mintaro, was in later decades a premium sheep stud owned by Sir Samuel Way. During Oakden's time in the Clare Valley Mount Oakden (altitude 568 metres (1,864 ft)) at nearby Penwortham was named for him. He was a close associate of neighbouring pastoralist John Ainsworth Horrocks, whose brother Arthur Horrocks resided with Oakden at Kadlunga from 1846 until his marriage in 1850, at which Oakden was groomsman. In 1846 Oakden had leased Kadlunga from Stein, who in 1848 became insolvent. Oakden then managed it until 1850.

== Oakden Hills, South Australia ==
In 1851, seeking fresh pastoralism opportunities on his own account, Oakden struck out into the remote and unexplored north of South Australia in partnership with Henry Stephen Hulkes (1812–1884), grandson of British M.P. James Hulkes. Oakden aimed for the same distant hills which the ill-fated Horrocks expedition never reached. This, the first expedition up the western side of Lake Torrens, indicated a route northwards beyond the perceived barrier of the mysterious 'Horse-Shoe Lake' and gave an impetus for further explorations. The pair came by the Oakden Hills and Hulkes Hills, geographical features in the Woomera region that were named after them in 1858 by the Babbage expedition. The highest peak of the Oakden Hills is named Mount Oakden. They established a pastoral farming run nearby, but gave this up in 1852 when Hulkes was enticed to the Bendigo gold rush. Additionally, they came under increased threat of attack on this frontier from local Aboriginals. When Oakden had broken up his station in March 1852, and was leaving the district, his party was sleeping under a bullock dray when they were disturbed by a number of Aboriginals approaching in the night. One of his party fired a shot amongst them, causing them to disperse, evidently without injury. Through association, Oakden Hills Station, 170 kilometres north of Port Augusta, between Lake Gairdner and Lake Torrens, today bears Oakden's name.

== Acheron Bank Station, New Zealand ==
Returning to the Clare Valley, Oakden became associated with William Robinson, of Hill River Station. In 1854 he was deputed by Robinson to go to New Zealand with a view to selecting pastoralism land. This accomplished, he returned to South Australia to wind up his affairs and returned to New Zealand in 1855. He then purchased Acheron Bank Station near Lake Coleridge in the Canterbury region, which he successfully developed and held until 1877, when he sold up to enjoy an affluent retirement at Riccarton. Mount Oakden in the Mid-Canterbury Ranges bears his name. From the late 1860s he was a committee member of the Canterbury branch of the Acclimatisation Society, being active in the introduction to New Zealand of trout and Chinook salmon, among other non-native fauna. Oakden visited family in England 1878–1882. He died at his Riccarton home on 31 March 1884, aged 66, of a liver complaint.

An affable character, Oakden is reputed to have constantly dressed like a gamekeeper, and looked like one. Always keen on sporting pursuits, particularly the turf and the Hunt Club, he rarely engaged in public life and he never married. Some of his personal papers are held by the Canterbury Museum. Oakden holds the distinction of having three peaks named after him, yet there is no record that he ever ascended any of them.
