= Saint Aloysius' College (Sevenhill) =

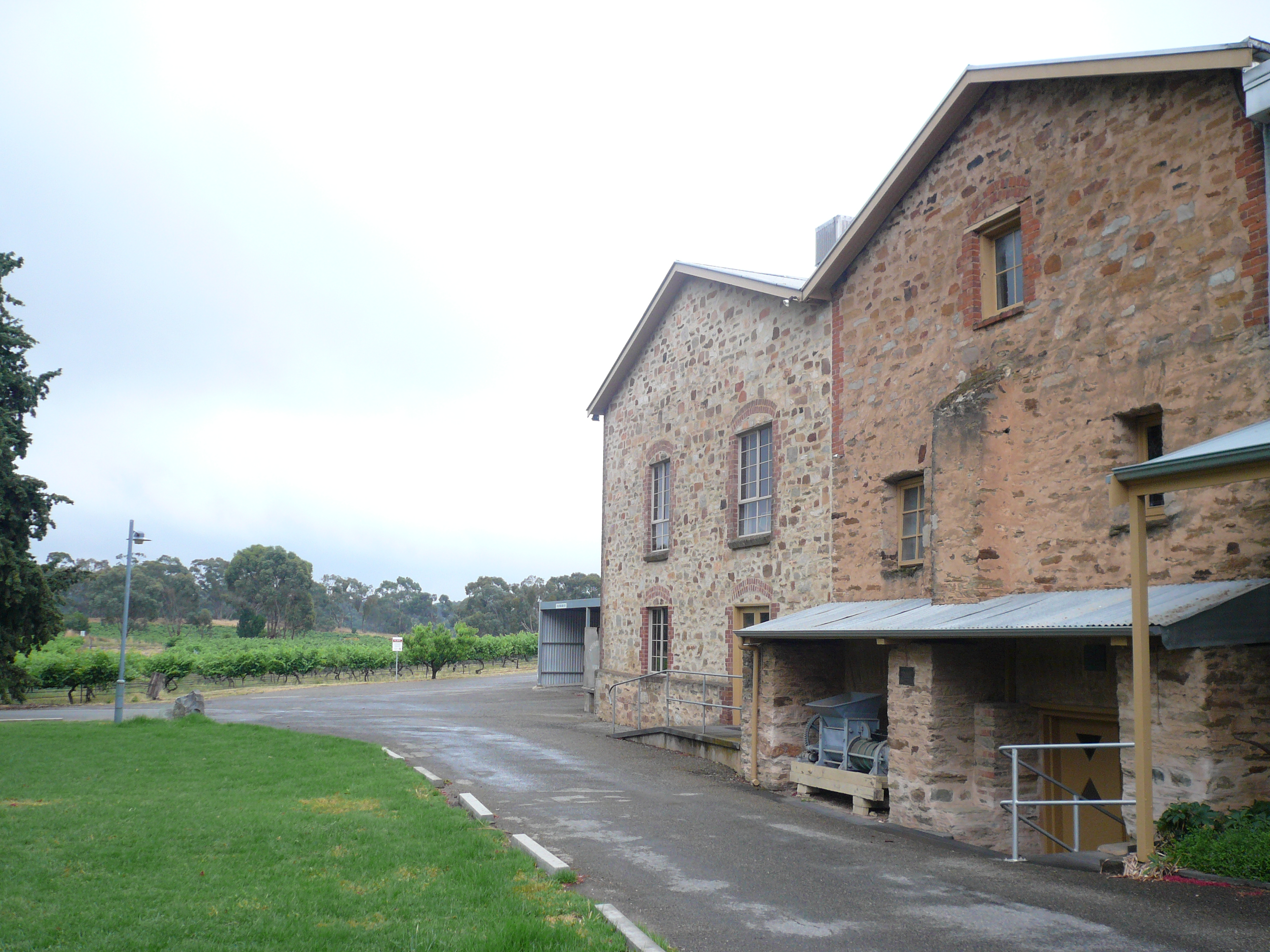
- Former Saint Aloysius' College buildings that now form part of Sevenhill Cellars, pictured in 2009

Location
- Sevenhill, Clare Valley, South Australia; Australia
- Coordinates: 33°53′07″S 138°38′15″E

Information
- Type: Independent boarding school
- Religious affiliation(s): Jesuit
- Denomination: Roman Catholic
- Established: 1856
- Status: Closed
- Closed: 1886
- Colour(s): Red, black, white

Saint Aloysius' College was an independent Roman Catholic boarding school in Sevenhill, in the Clare Valley region of South Australia that existed from 1856 to 1886. It was the first Catholic boarding school in South Australia. It also served as a seminary, novitiate and retreat centre. The school was part of the international network of Jesuit schools begun in Messina, Sicily in 1548. It is now part of the Sevenhill Cellars site.

== History ==
The Austrian Jesuits fled Europe to escape political and religious oppression and established a mission the Mid North and Far North regions of South Australia in 1851. They were based at Sevenhill, South Australia in the Clare Valley, and constructed a short-lived boarding College, Saint Aloyisius College, open between 1856 and 1886. This College is the site of Saint Aloysius, Sevenhill and Sevenhill Cellars. It also makes up one part of the Centre of Ignatian Spirituality.

Saint Aloysius' College began in Sevenhill in 1856, as part of the Jesuit missioning to the colony of South Australia. The college took on boarders, as a boys only college, from places as far away as Victoria, Tasmania and New Zealand.

By 1866 the college was housed in fine buildings in extensive grounds, including playing fields. Renowned throughout Australia, it was at that time the only Roman Catholic educational establishment in South Australia, having pupils from nearly all the other colonies of Australia. The college operated until 1886, by which time Catholic education was more widely available.

In 1886 the school was closed, with increasing competition from Christian Brothers College, Adelaide. Its sister schools include Saint Ignatius' College, Adelaide, St Ignatius' College, Riverview, St Aloysius' College and Loyola College, Mount Druitt in Sydney and Xavier College in Melbourne.

Beside secular education for all creeds, the establishment included a seminary which trained young men for priesthood in the Catholic Church, which continued well after closure of the college.

Today, the buildings and grounds of the College continue to be owned and operated by the Society of Jesus, operating as a parish, retreat centre, and winery.

== Notable alumni ==
Fr. Julian Tenison-Woods prepared for ordination there under Fr. Joseph Tappeiner May–November 1856.

Other secular priests who studied there were Christopher Reynolds (first Archbishop of Adelaide), Frederick Byrne (Vicar General), Frs. Plormel and Brecas the younger, of the Rockhampton Diocese, Peter Jorgensen, and Thomas Guilfoyle, all of whom were there for two years; and George Williams (11), Edmund O'Brien (8), and Michael O'Sullivan (5).

== See also ==
- List of schools in South Australia
- Catholic education in Australia
- Education in South Australia
