= Broughton River =

Broughton River may refer to:

- Broughton River (Queensland), a river located in Queensland, Australia.
- Broughton River (South Australia), a river located in South Australia
