= Polish Hill River, South Australia =

Polish Hill River
- Town
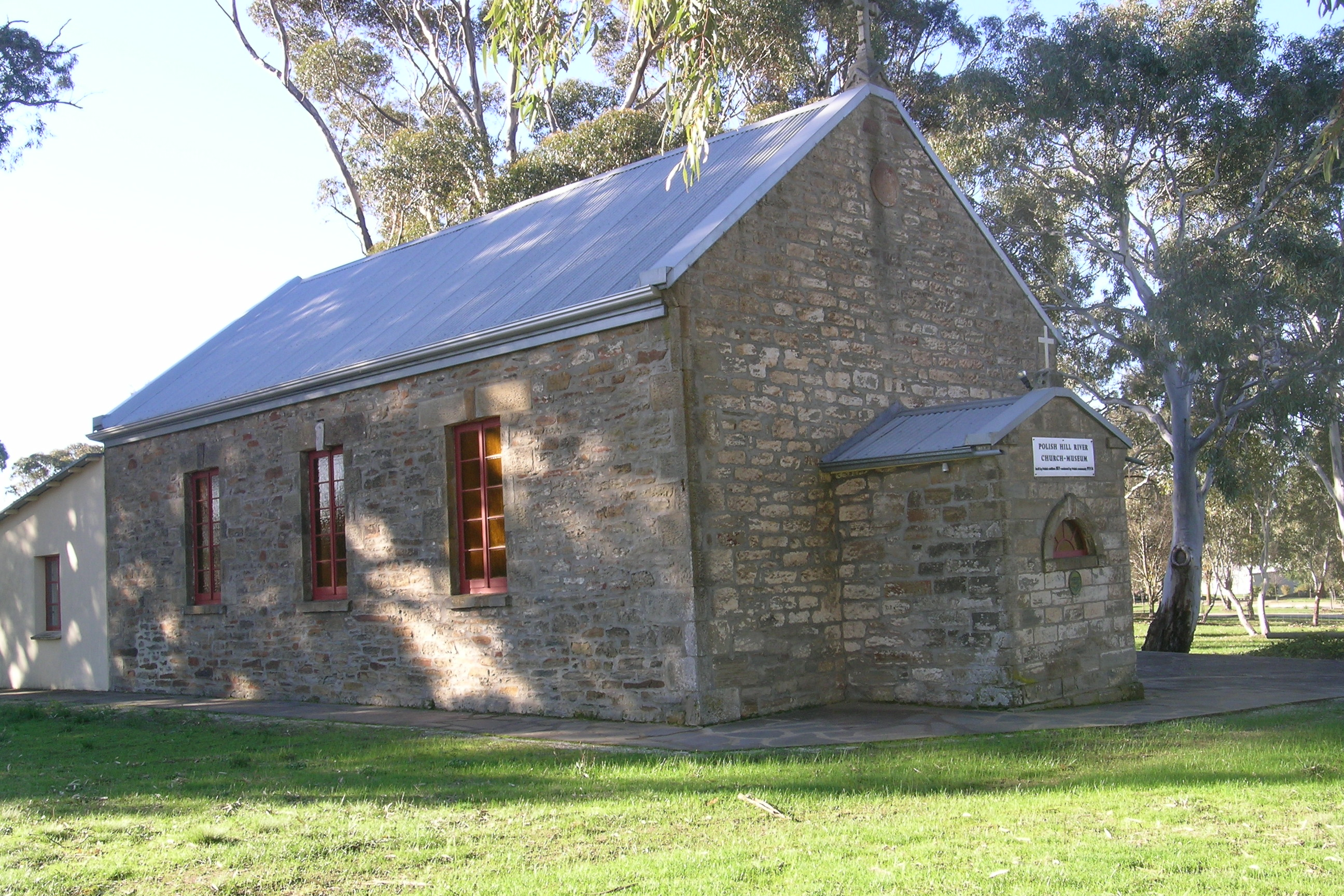
- Church museum at Polish Hill River

- Coordinates: 33°53′06″S 138°40′19″E
- Country: Australia
- State: South Australia
- Region: Mid North
- LGA: District Council of Clare and Gilbert Valleys
- Location: 133 km (83 mi) north of Adelaide; 15 km (9.3 mi) south-east of Clare
- Established: 1844

Government
  - Mayor: Allan Aughey
  - State electorate: Frome
  - Federal division: Grey

Population
  - Total: 38 (SAL 2021)
- Postcode: 5453
Localities around Polish Hill River
Spring Farm	Hill River
Sevenhill	Polish Hill River	Stanley
Penwortham		Mintaro

Polish Hill River is a small town in the Mid North region of South Australia, between the towns of Sevenhill and Mintaro.

Running northward through the locality is the Hill River itself, discovered and named by Edward John Eyre in 1839 after John Hill, discoverer of the nearby Hutt River.

Following earlier pastoralism, closer settlement in the area began in the early 1850s, with the arrival of Irish Catholic migrants, including the Barry, Sullivan, Erwin, and Rochford families who were all from Glendalough, County Wicklow. The first white child born at Hill River was claimed to be James Erwin, in 1853. Polish Hill River was also established in the 1850s south of the Hill River settlement, around the church of St. Stanislaus Kostka by Polish Catholic immigrants. These included Dr Anton Sokolowsky (d.1862).

The former church now houses a museum of Polish migrants to South Australia. Several well-known wineries exist in the Polish Hill River area, including Pikes, Pauletts, Wilson Vineyard and Little Brampton Wines. Grossett Wines also source grapes from this area. A circuit from the Riesling Trail, the Father Rogalski Loop, provides a walking and cycling entry to the Polish Hill River region.
