= S. T. Gill =

English-born Australian artist (1818–1880)

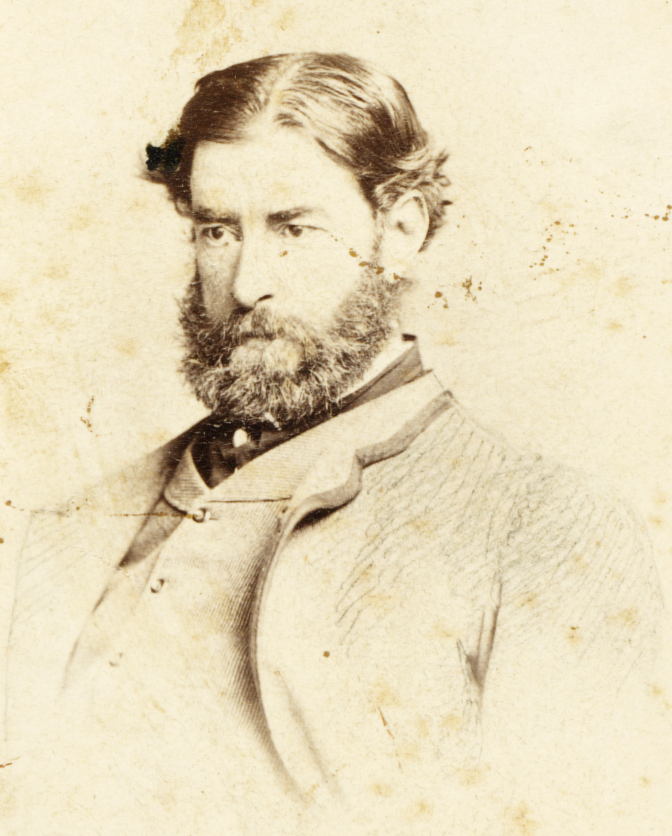
- Portrait of Samuel Thomas Gill, c.1865, by unknown, from carte de visite albumen print
- Born: Samuel Thomas Gill; 21 May 1818; Somerset, England
- Died: 27 October 1880 (aged 62); Melbourne, Australia
- Known for: Watercolours and lithographs

Samuel Thomas Gill (21 May 1818 – 27 October 1880), also known by his signature S.T.G., was an English-born Australian artist.

== Early life ==
Gill was born in Periton, Minehead, Somerset, England, in 1818. He was the son of the Reverend Samuel Gill, a Baptist minister, and his first wife, Winifred Oke. Rev. Gill became the headmaster of a school in Plymouth, where the son was first educated, then he continued to Dr Seabrook's Academy, Plymouth. Having moved to London, Gill appears to have exhibited his watercolours and worked as a draftsman at the Hubbard Public Gallery in London.

== Australia ==
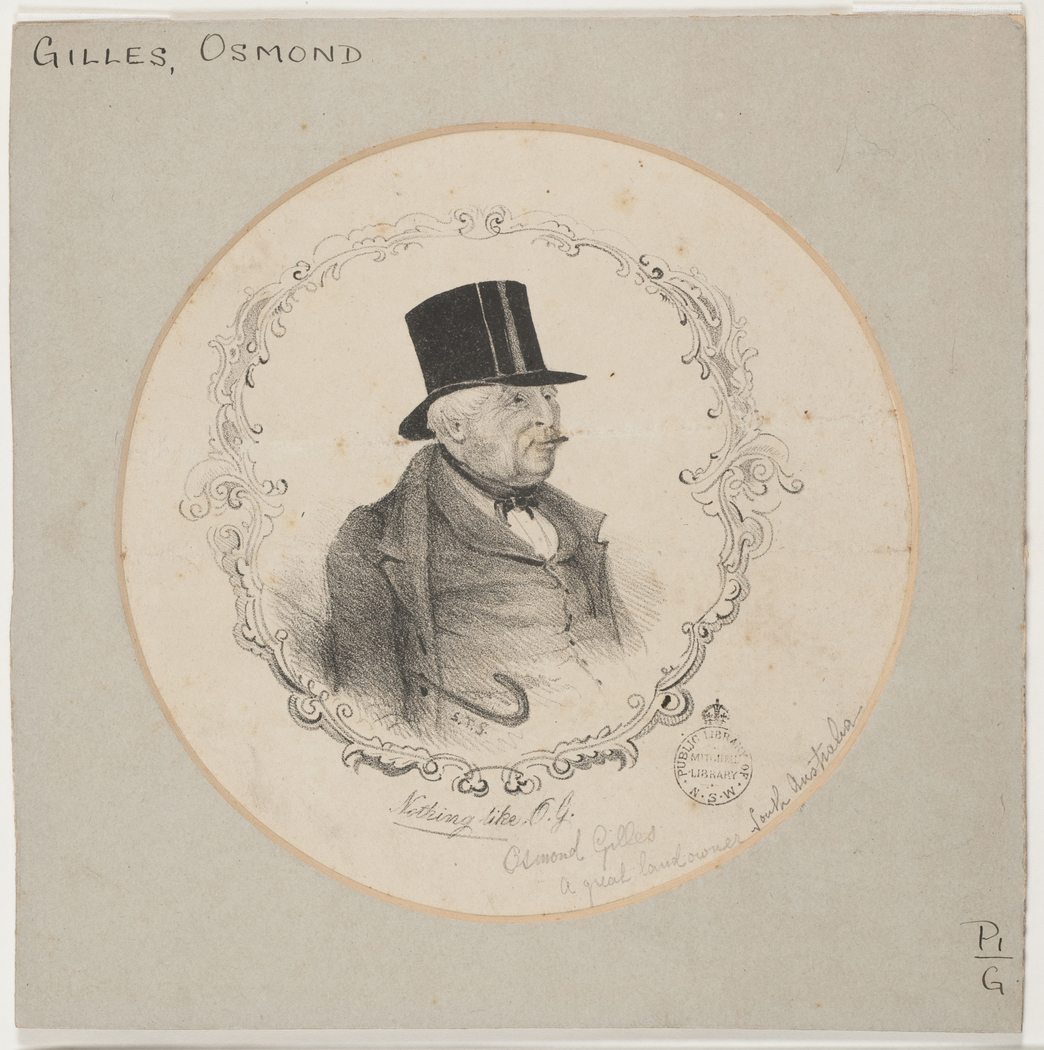
Osmund Gilles, 1849, S. T. Gill, P1/627

On 17 December 1839 Samuel Thomas Gill (or S.T. Gill) and his family arrived in Adelaide aboard the Caroline. His father Samuel Gill (snr.) settled at the Coromandel Valley where he became the postmaster and opened a "Classical and Mathematical Preparatory School" for boys under twelve. His son S. T. Gill opened rooms at Gawler Place, Adelaide where he advertised portrait work and local scenery, "executed to order". One of the earlier works credited to Gill is a view of Hindley Street, Adelaide, which was published as a coloured print 1844.

His activities soon expanded to include street scenes and public events, including the newly discovered copper mines at Burra Burra and the departure of Charles Sturt's expedition for the interior on 8 October 1844. His sketching tours of the districts surrounding Adelaide, produced a number of watercolours.

Gill took an interest in photography – ordering a daguerreotype camera and the other necessary equipment in 1846, and setting up as a professional photographer. With public interest in the new medium not forthcoming, Gill sold his camera to Robert Hall prior to his departure with John Horrocks' expedition northwards to the Flinders Ranges later in 1846. While on this expedition he made the first sketch of these ranges. Horrocks, the first settler of South Australia's Clare Valley, mounted a small expedition to search for suitable farming land in the country northwest of Mount Arden in the southern Flinders Ranges. This expedition was the first in Australia to use camels but even so ended after Horrocks accidentally discharged his gun and received a charge of shot in his face. Gill dressed the wounds but 'mortification set in' and the young explorer died forcing the party to return to Adelaide.

Upon his return Gill organised an exhibition to sell the watercolours and pencil sketches of this fateful trip but sales appear to have been slow and he was eventually forced to raffle them. In 1849 he published Heads of the People, which contained 12 lithographic sketches of well-known South Australian colonists.

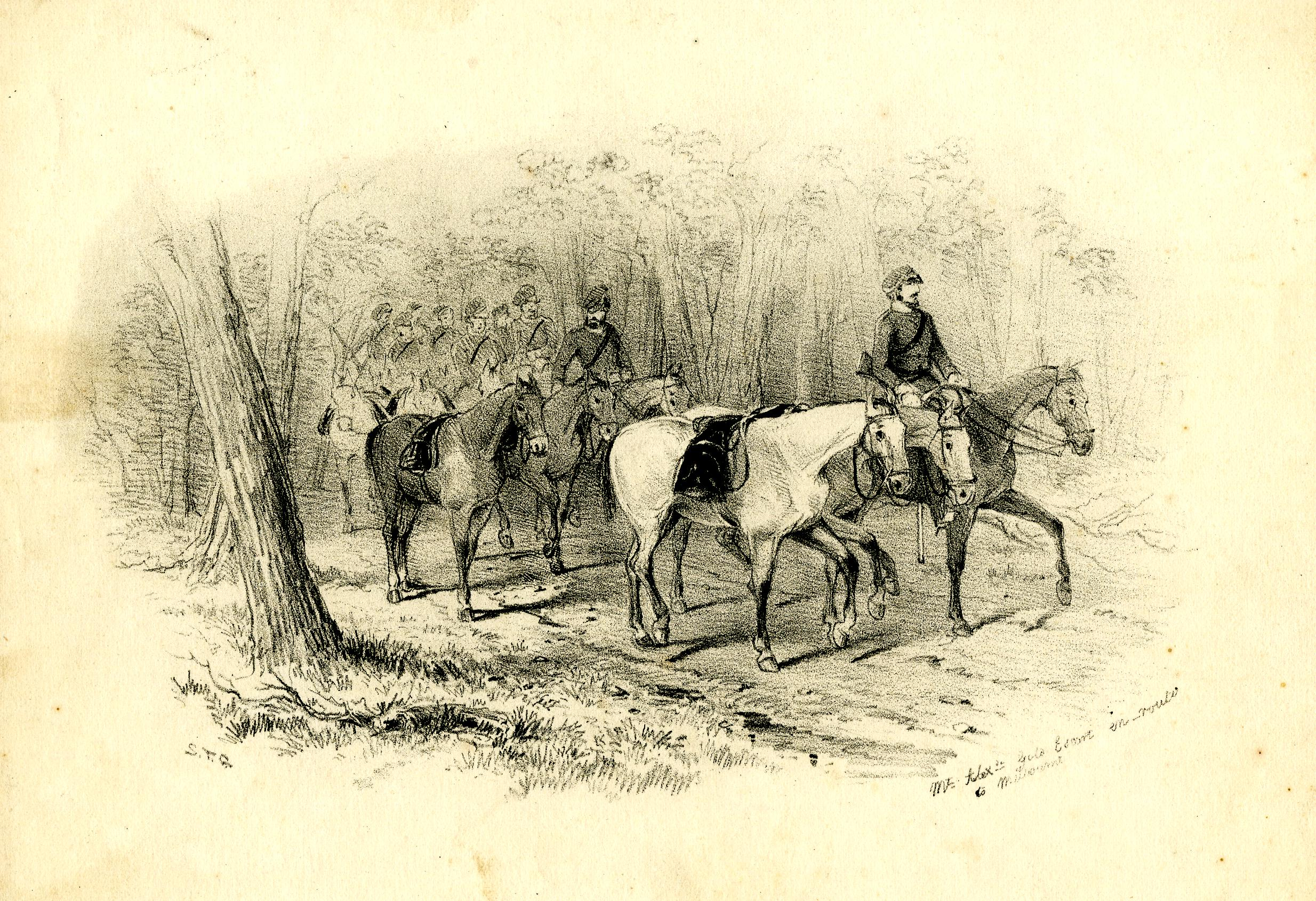
Mt Alexander Gold Escort en-route to Melbourne, 1852, S. T. Gill - one of the "Sketches of the Victoria Gold Diggings and Diggers As They Are"

In 1851 gold was discovered in Victoria and following a series of personal tragedies including bankruptcy and ill health, Gill joined a large group of South Australians heading for the Mount Alexander gold fields, Victoria. It is possible he tried his hand at gold-mining but presumably he had no luck as he was soon recording life on the gold fields and the emergence of substantial towns like those of Ballarat and Bendigo. By August 1852 he had published a set of 24 lithographs of "Sketches of the Victoria Gold Diggings and Diggers As They Are". Although they were described as "Part 1", no further parts were published.

Late in 1852 Gill moved to Melbourne where his exhibition of sketches and watercolours from the goldfields attracted so much attention that a firm of lithographers, Messrs. Macartney and Galbraith, later succeeded by J. S. Campbell and Co., engaged Gill to reproduce the works on lithographic stone. The results were so successful that the entire set was republished in London. In February 1853, he exhibited some watercolour drawings made from sketches done on the Horrocks expedition.

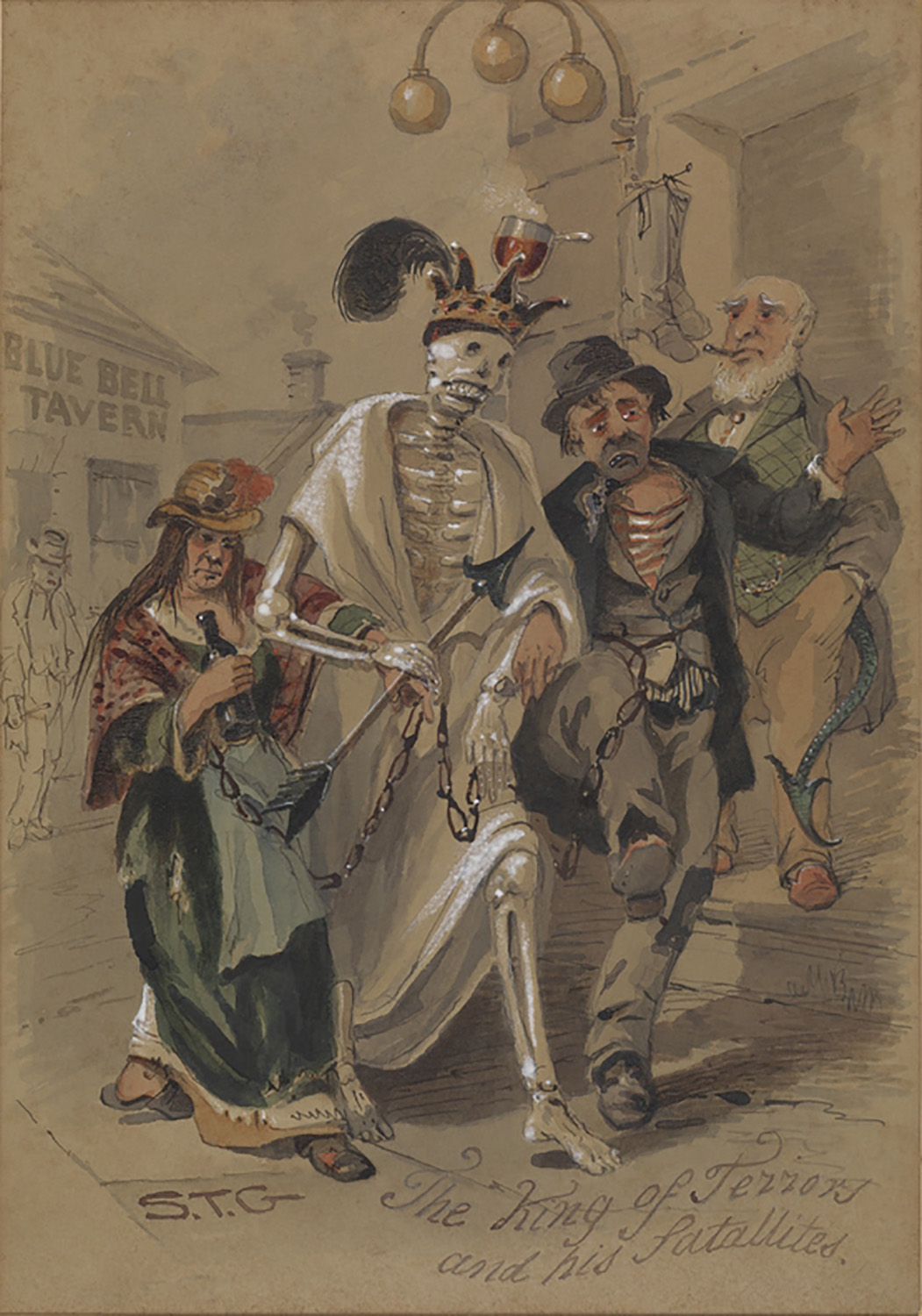
The King of Terrors and his Satellites, Samuel Thomas Gill, 1850–1880, from original watercolour, DG SV*/Sp Coll/Gill/11.

By 1854 Gill had taken residence in Melbourne and aside from a year in Sydney lived there for the rest of his life. Here he worked for the booksellers and publishers J. J. Blundell and Co. and had a studio above their premises in Collins Street. Blundell's son recalls that in 1853 Gill used this studio to work his designs directly on stone using a glass to aid him in the necessary reversals. The stones were then sent to Campbell and Fergusson's workshop a few doors away, where the reproduction work was carried out, and the resulting prints were returned to Blundell and Co. bearing the names of both the lithographer and publisher. He also produced works for Messrs' Sands and Kenny and over this period he produced a number of lithographs on stone as well as works engraved on copper and steel.

At the height of this success Gill decided to move to Sydney where he worked on the publication of views of New South Wales, and a Kangaroo hunt, with Allen and Wigley. But by 1857 he was back in Melbourne providing designs for Sands and Kenny's elaborate Victoria Illustrated.

Gill's skill as a lithographer resulted in the production of a number of works during this period. These included: The Australian Sketch Book (1855), Scenery in and Around Sydney (1856), Victoria Illustrated (1857), Sketches in Victoria (1860), Second Series of Victoria Illustrated (1862), and a set of coloured lithographs, Bush Life (1865). In 1859, Edward Wilson selected Gill to illustrate his book, Rambles in the Antipodes. He also procured a major commission from the Trustees of the Melbourne Public Library in 1869, to reproduce 40 of his earlier watercolours of life on the Victorian goldfields. At the same time as the Melbourne Public Library commission, Gill prepared a largely identical set of 53 watercolours under the title drawing of The Goldfields of Victoria During 1852–53. Comprising Fifty Sketches of Life and Character Primative (sic) Operations etc, etc., By S.T. Gill Melbourne, 1872.

By the end of the 1860s Gill was at the height of his success and appears to have indulged in the many temptations on offer in Melbourne and Sydney at this time. He frequented the resorts of the bohemians of the day such as Cafe de Paris, Charlie Wright's dancing-rooms, the bars of the Theatre Royal or Stutt's Buffet. Unfortunately Gill appears to have fallen into a dissolute life of drink and the demand for his work started to fall off. Over the latter part of his life he was often destitute and even bartered his sketches for drinks at his favourite watering holes like the Mitre Tavern.

Gill's last commissions was given to him by the architect, Arthur Peck. On 27 October 1880, Gill was adding embellishments to the perspective view of a building. But according to the report in The Sun his hands shook to such an extent that the architect mistrusted his fitness for holding a brush and put him off until the following day. Gill wandered out into the Melbourne streets but clearly his health by this time was broken through drink and syphilis, and as he tried to climb the steps of the Melbourne Post Office he collapsed and died from an aneurism of the aorta."

In 1880 he was buried in a pauper's grave. In 1913 a tombstone was erected over his remains at the suggestion of AW Greig, and thanks to a subscription raised by the Historical Society of Victoria. The stone bears the simple inscription: "Samuel Thomas Gill, The artist of the Goldfields. Born 1818. Died 1880".

== Gallery ==
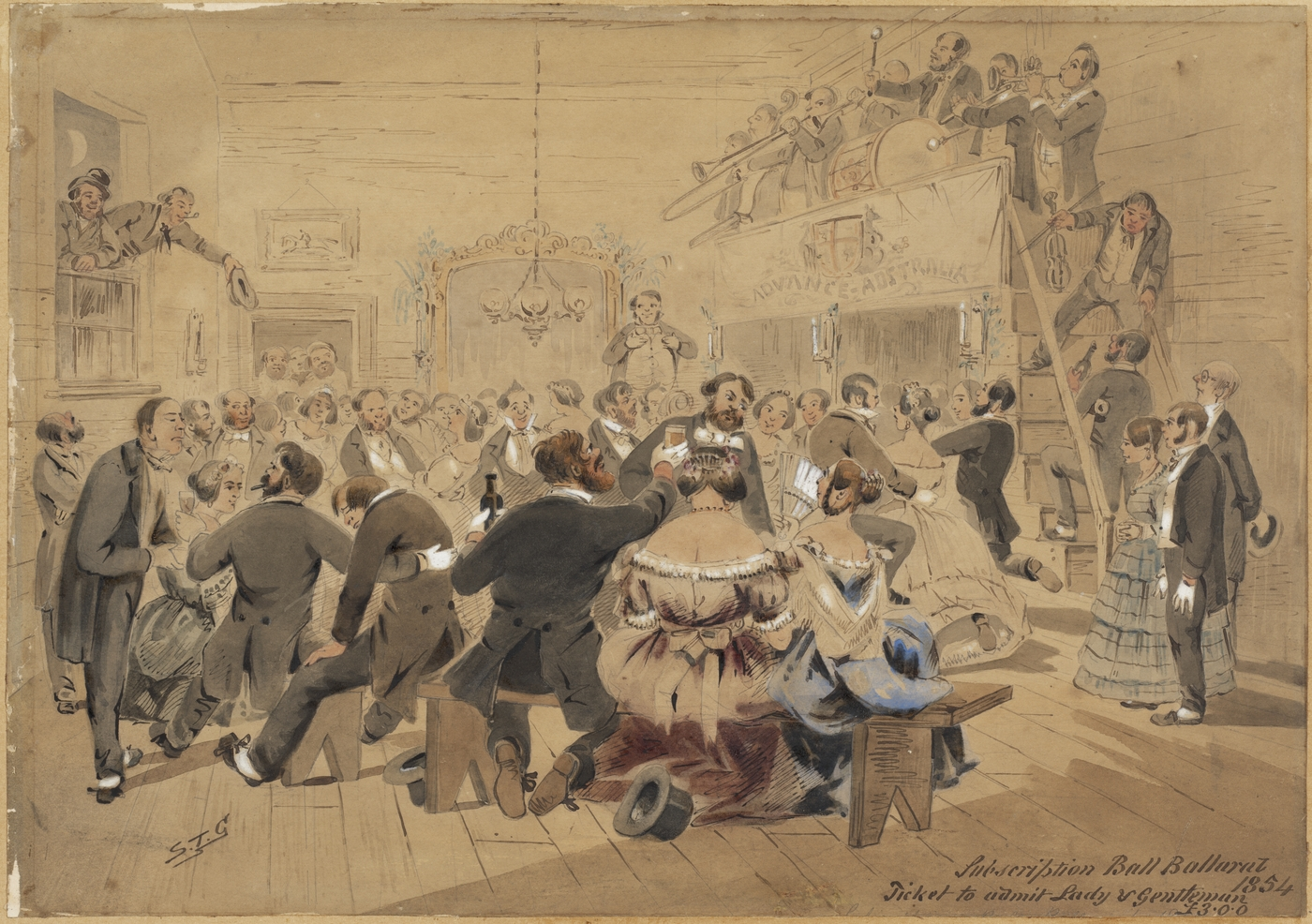
This image shows people on the goldfields in Australia at a dance in 1854.

Rundle Street looking east, 1846 (Adelaide (Pirie Street): Published by Penman & Galbraith, 1851, lithograph; sheet 20.2 x 25.7 cm.

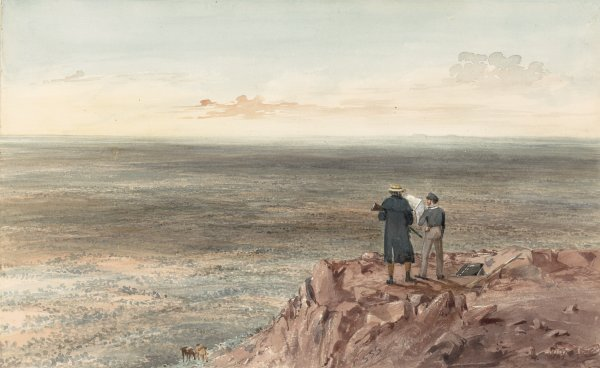
Country NW of tableland, 22 August 1846, watercolour; 19 x 30.7 cm. Painted from sketches made during the Horrocks expedition.

Royal Arcade, Melbourne, ca. 1854, watercolour on paper; 62 x 81 cm.

Diggings in the Mount Alexander district of Victoria in 1852, 1874, watercolour on paper; 24.5 x 35 cm.

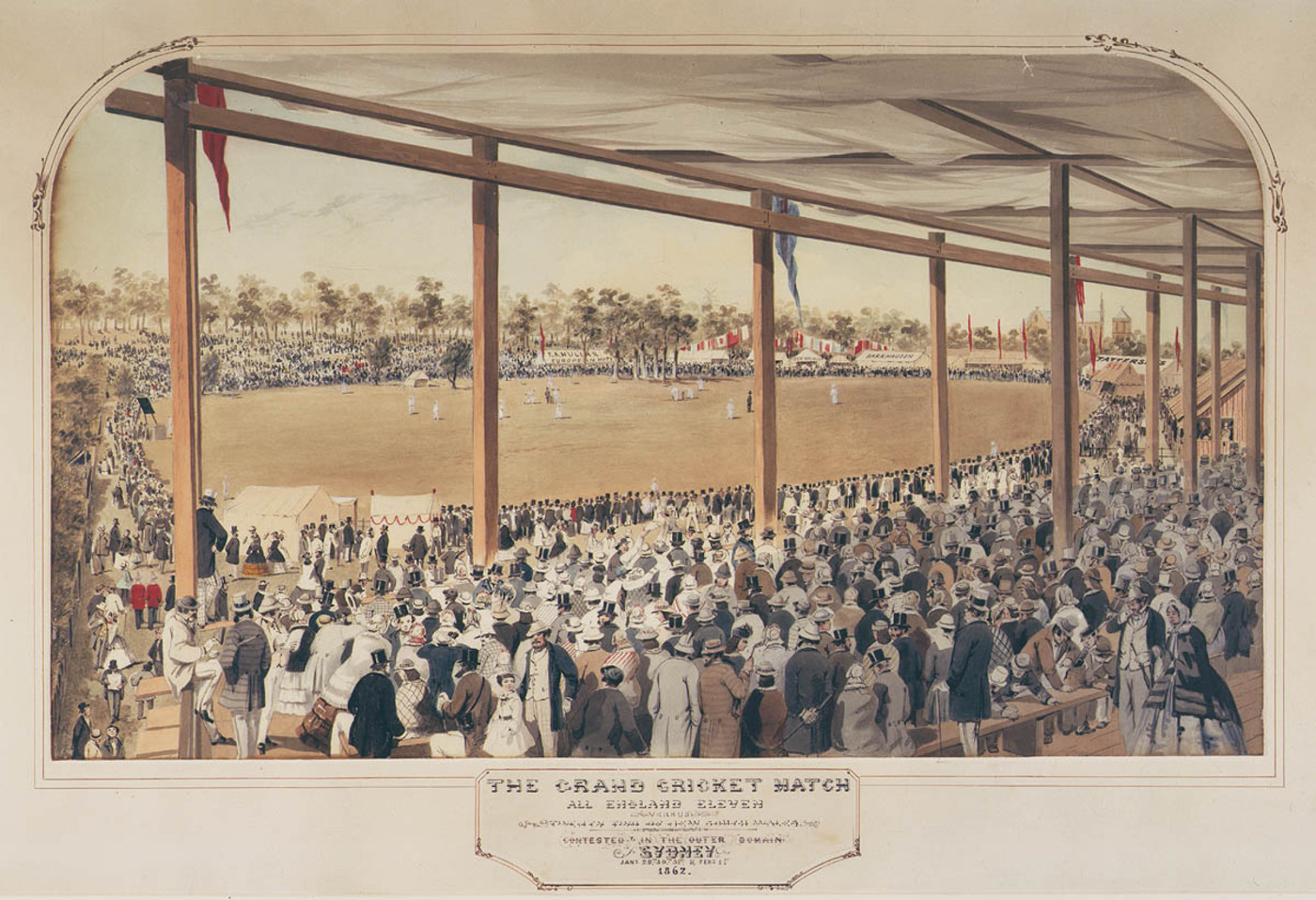
The grand cricket match: England v New South Wales, Outer Domain, Sydney, Jan. 29, 30, 31 & 1 Feb. 1862; watercolour.

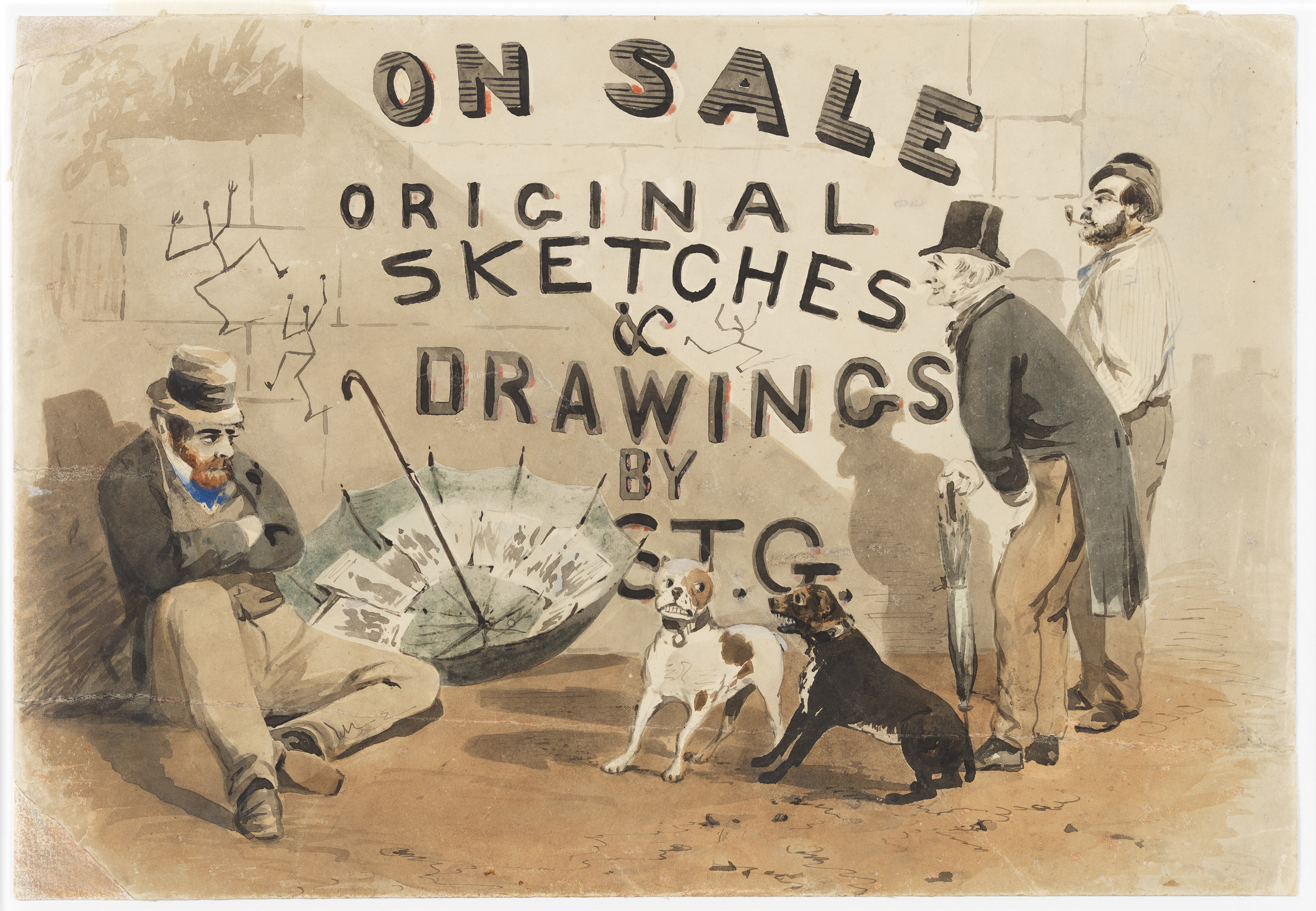
Original sketches, 1844-1866, by S.T. Gill, drawings and watercolours from original portfolio PX*D 383

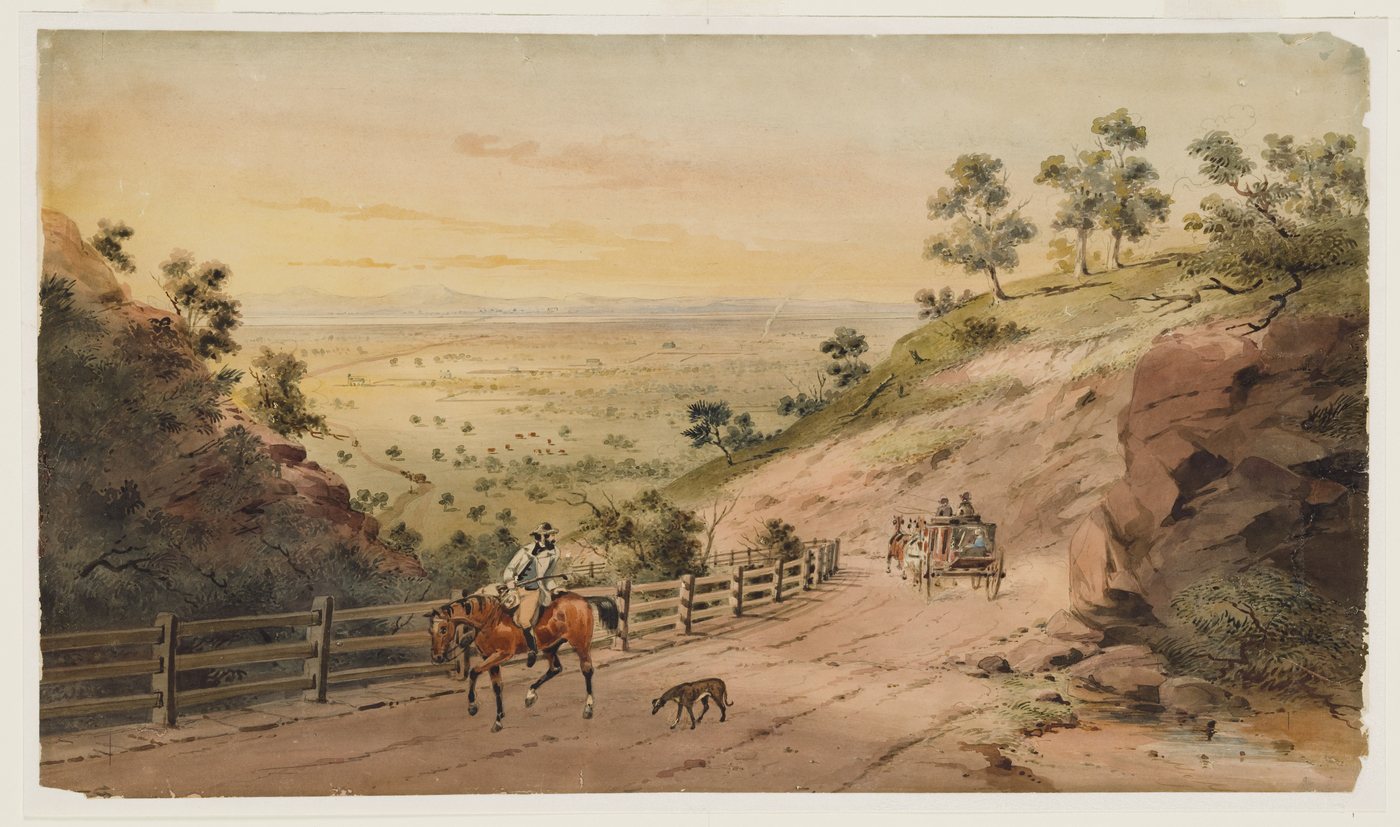
Lapstone Hill, Blue Mountains, New South Wales, ca. 1856, by S.T. Gill, watercolour,DG V*/Sp Coll/Gill/12

== Publications ==
- Gill, S. (1852). Sketches of the Victorian gold diggings and diggers as they are, 1852 [picture], Q85/146
- Gill, S., & H. H. Collins & Co. (1853). Sketches of the Victoria Gold Diggings and Diggers as They Are. Part I [picture] / by S.T.G., Q85/57
- Gill, S. (1855). Sketches in Victoria. No. [1-4] / drawn on stone by S.T.G. Melbourne: James J. Blundell, DSM/741/G
- Gill, S., & J. Luntley & Co. (1855). Sketches of the gold diggers comprising 16 chromo-lithographic plates. London: J. Luntley &., 85/536
- Gill, S. T. (Samuel Thomas), (1855), Sketches in Victoria. No. (1–4), Melbourne: J.J. Blundell.
- Gill, S. T. (Samuel Thomas), (1855), The Australian sketch book, Melbourne, s.n.
- Gill, S., & Allan & Wigley. (1856). Scenery in & around Sydney [picture] / by S.T.G, Q85/53
- Gill, S., & Tingle, J. (1857). Victoria illustrated. Melbourne: Sands, Kenny, RB/DQ992A/2
- Gill, S. T. (Samuel Thomas), (1857), Victoria illustrated, Melbourne: Sands & Kenny.
- Gill, S. T. (Samuel Thomas), (1862), Victoria illustrated, Second series, with descriptive letterpress, Melbourne: Sands, Kenny.
- Gill, S. (1864). The Australian sketch book / by S.T.Gill. Melbourne]: Hamel & Ferguson, RB/F990.1A/11
- Gill, S., & Allan & Wigley. (1865). Sydney illustrated. Sydney: Allan & Wigley, Q981.1/G
- Gill, S. T. (1869). The Victorian Gold Fields During 1852 & 3, Comprising Forty Original Sketches By S.T. Gill: Drawn By Desire of the Trustees of the M.P.L., Melbourne Public Library, OCLC 933219720, reprinted Gill, S. T. and Michael Cannon (ed.) (1982) as The Victorian Gold Fields, 1852-3: An Original Album, J. Currey, OŃeil Publishers, ISBN 9780859023122
- Gill, S. (1872). The gold fields of Victoria during 1852–3 : Comprising 50 original sketches. Melbourne, Q87/83

== See also ==
- Art of Australia

== References and sources ==
References
