= Crystal Brook (creek) =

Crystal
- Location of the river mouth in South Australia

Location
- Country: Australia
- State: South Australia
- Region: Mid North

Physical characteristics
- Source: Mount Zion
  - location: Wirrabara Forest
  - elevation: 367 m (1,204 ft)
- Mouth: confluence with the Broughton River
  - location: west of Crystal Brook
  - coordinates: 33°21′S 138°06′E
  - elevation: 46 m (151 ft)
- Length: 41 km (25 mi)

Basin features
- River system: Broughton River
- Waterhole: Beetaloo Reservoir

The Crystal Brook is an ephemeral stream in the Mid North region of the Australian state of South Australia.

== Course and features ==
The stream was named in 1839 by the explorer Edward John Eyre for its clear water. Eyre is recorded as saying that it "so forcibly reminded me of the beautiful bubbling brooks at home [England] that I at once named it the Chrystal Brook".

In most of its length it is normally a dry creek; it rises in the Wirrabara Forest area and is one of the major tributaries to the Broughton River, which it joins about 15 kilometres (9.3 mi) from the latter's mouth. At Bowman Park there is a permanent spring, and this is probably the "Crystal" water that Eyre was referring to when he named the stream. The brook only flows for its whole length following exceptional rains or a wetter than usual winter or spring.

== See also ==
- List of rivers of Australia § South Australia
