= Bowman Park =

Park in South Australia

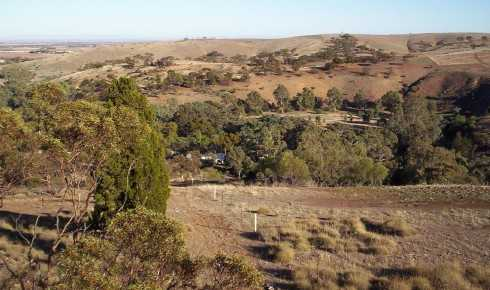
- Overlooking Bowman Park from the lookout tower on the eastern boundary in February 2006

- Location within Australia
- Type: Public park
- Location: South Australia, Australia
- Nearest city: Adelaide
- Nearest town: Crystal Brook
- Coordinates: 33.316667°S 138.233333°E
- Area: 40 hectares (99 acres)
- Founder: Bowman Brothers
- Etymology: Named for the Bowman Brothers who settled in the area around 1850
- Operator: Port Pirie Regional Council
- Open: Sunrise to sunset
- Hiking trails: Heysen Trail
- Water: Crystal Brook
- Species: Kangaroo, Echidna
- Facilities: Toilets, electric barbecues, nature playground, lodge for walkers' accommodation
- Website: http://bowmanpark.webs.com/

Bowman Park is a public park in South Australia located on the Crystal Brook about 5 km northeast of the township of Crystal Brook and 200 km north of the capital city of Adelaide. The park has an area of about 40ha and is in the Mid North region of the state of South Australia, and named for the Bowman Brothers who settled in the area around 1850.

Bowman Park is open to the public from sunrise to sunset. Toilets and electric barbecues are available, dogs are allowed on leashes. It has an excellent nature playground, which blends into the river red gums and natural environment around the park.

The brook (or more typically Australian, 'creek') is fed by a permanent spring on the northern side of Bowman Park. In most other places the Crystal Brook is normally dry.

The long distance Heysen Trail passes through Bowman Park and there is a lodge for walkers' accommodation within the park. Kangaroos can often be seen in and near the park, especially mornings and evenings. There is some evidence of echidna activity.

There are a number of weed species in the park: Pepper trees (Schinus molle), olive trees, artichoke and Scotch thistles, box thorn, horehound, fennel, and others. In 2005 a program to greatly reduce the number of pepper trees was under way. A problem is that the Port Pirie Regional Council do not have any policy specifying which species in the park should be considered weeds. Other species that some people would consider inappropriate in this environment are willows and (non native) pines.

== See also ==
- List of parks and gardens in rural South Australia
