= Rocky River (South Australia) =

- Location of the river mouth in South Australia

Location
- Country: Australia
- State: South Australia
- Region: Mid North

Physical characteristics
- Source: Frypan Hill
  - location: Wirrabara Forest
  - elevation: 700 m (2,300 ft)
- Mouth: confluence with the Broughton River
  - location: southwest of Crystal Brook
  - coordinates: 33°24′01″S 138°07′59″E
- Length: 102 km (63 mi)
- Basin size: 1,350 km^{2} (520 sq mi)

Basin features
- River system: Broughton River
- Tributaries
  - left: Appila Creek, Pine Creek, Pisant/Yanga Creek, Narridy Creek, Yackamoorundie/Rocky Creek
  - right: Ippinitchie

The Rocky River is a river in the Mid North region of the Australian state of South Australia.

== Course and features ==
The river rises near the Wirrabara Forest and, after initially flowing north, flows in a generally southern direction past the towns of Wirrabara, Stone Hut, Laura and Gladstone before reaching its confluence with the Broughton River. Tributaries include Ippinitchie, Pine, Appila, Pisant, Narridy and Yackamoorundie creeks. The catchment area of Rocky River is approximately 1,350 square kilometres (520 sq mi). The river descends 612 metres (2,008 ft) over its 102 kilometres (63 mi) course.

== See also ==
- List of rivers of Australia § South Australia
