= Sevenhill, South Australia =

Sevenhill South Australia
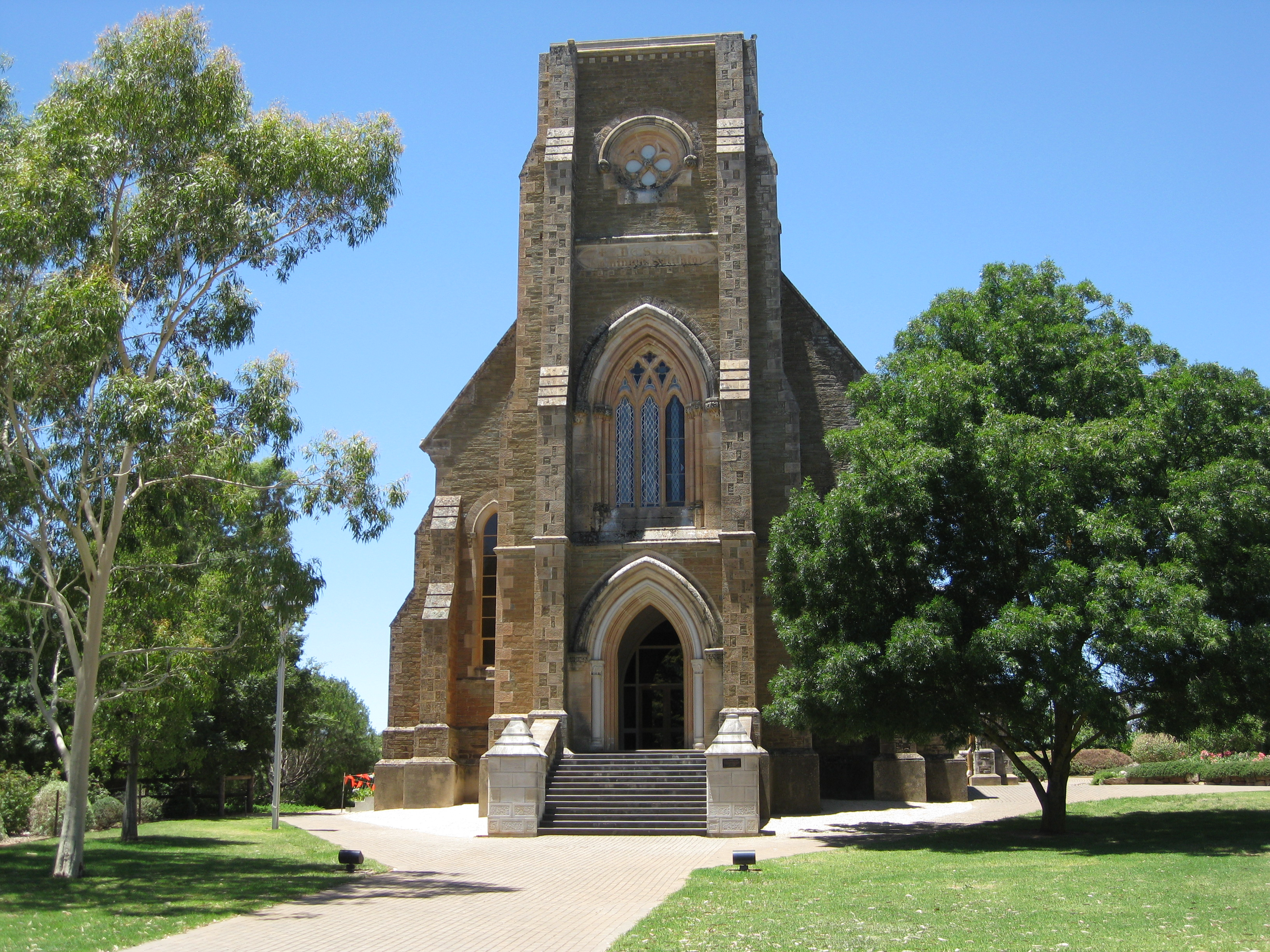
- St Aloysius Church, Sevenhill

- Coordinates: 33°53′0″S 138°37′0″E
- Population: 163 (SAL 2021)
- Established: 1850
- Postcode(s): 5453
- Location: 128 km (80 mi) north of Adelaide; 8 km (5 mi) south of Clare
- LGA(s): District Council of Clare and Gilbert Valleys
- Region: Mid North
- State electorate(s): Frome
- Federal division(s): Grey
Localities around Sevenhill:
Gillentown	Clare; Spring Farm	Hill River
Spring Gully	Sevenhill	Polish Hill River
Hoyleton	Penwortham; Watervale	Mintaro

The Australian monastic town of Sevenhill is in the Clare Valley of South Australia, approximately 130 km north of Adelaide. The town was founded by members of the Jesuit order in 1850. The name, bestowed by Austrian Jesuit priest Aloysius Kranewitter, is in homage to the seven hills of Rome.

== History ==
The first Jesuits in the locality were based in Clare from 1848. They were being urged by Catholic Prussians at Tanunda, who felt uncomfortable among the more numerous Lutheran Prussians, to establish a Catholic settlement in the Clare district and so began a search for a suitable locality.

Section 91 in the Hundred of Clare had been purchased in 1850 as a speculation by Thomas Burr, former Deputy Surveyor General of South Australia. Jesuit priest Aloysius Kranewitter was delighted with the prospects of the hilly and fertile location and, through his influence, Burr surveyed this land into allotments for leasing, which became the township of Sevenhill.

In December 1850, in consultation with Burr, the allotment layout and limits of the new settlement were settled by Kranewitter. By January 1851 Kranewitter was calling the future site Sevenhill Township. The first lots became available from April 1851, all for 31 years' lease with easy right of purchase terms, and soon many Catholics, particularly Irish, Polish, and German, were moving there from Kapunda, Tanunda, Burra and other districts.

Over time, particularly during the 1930s and 1940s, it became unclear whether the correct name of the township was Sevenhill, or Sevenhills, arousing debate. Clare philatelist Albert Fryar provided conclusive evidence (cuttings from envelopes and postal cancellations) that the original title was indeed Sevenhill.

== Saint Aloysius Church, seminary and college ==
In 1851, at about the same time that Burr and Kranewitter established the township, the Jesuits established the current Saint Aloysius Church and Sevenhill Winery about one kilometre east, nearer the Hill River. Local settler Francis Weikert, who donated land for the establishment, is buried in the Sevenhill cemetery.

In September 1851, Brother Schreiner brought some vine rootlings from Bungaree Station, beginning the Sevenhill vineyard, leading to a flourishing wine industry.

In 1856, Saint Aloysius' College was established. By 1866 the college was housed in fine buildings in extensive grounds, including playing fields. Renowned throughout Australia, it was at that time the only Roman Catholic educational establishment in South Australia, having pupils from nearly all the other colonies of Australia. The college operated until 1886, by which time Catholic education was more widely available.

Beside secular education for all creeds, the establishment included a seminary which trained young men for priesthood in the Catholic Church, which continued well after closure of the college. Fr. Julian Tenison-Woods, its first and perhaps most famous extern, prepared for ordination there under Fr. Joseph Tappeiner May–November 1856. Other secular priests who studied there were C. A. Reynolds (first Archbishop of Adelaide), Frederick Byrne (Vicar General), Frs. Plormel and Brecas the younger, of the Rockhampton Diocese, Peter Jorgensen, and Thomas Guilfoyle, all of whom were there for two years; and George Williams (11), Edmund O'Brien (8), and Michael O'Sullivan (5).

== Railway ==
A railway line was built from Riverton to Clare in 1919 and on to Spalding in 1922. The Ash Wednesday bushfires severed the track between Sevenhill and Penwortham causing the demise of the railway. It closed in April 1984 and the tracks were removed in 1989, but the alignment now carries the Riesling Trail cycling and walking path.

== Present ==
The nearby town of Clare serves many of the commercial needs of the Sevenhill district, and is a centre of government administration. Sevenhill supports a hotel, a regional cellar door showcasing wines from more than a dozen boutique producers, a gourmet bakery (the only bakery in the region), a homewares shop, several bed and breakfast cottages, a Country Fire Service station and an antique shop. The community hall is also used as a weekend market stall and Friday night bingo is a tradition. Several of the region's famous wineries and cellar doors are located east and west of Sevenhill. Pikes Winery adjoins the former St Aloysius' college.

The town's oval is found east of the main cross road and has toilet facilities. It supports a cricket team during the summer months and tennis facilities are also located here.

Sevenhill is at the "heart" of the Clare Valley and a hub for the locals and tourists visiting the region. It is a suitable place for access to the Riesling Trail walking and cycling route just east of the town, with off-road parking facilities available.

== Geography and climate ==
Sevenhill is sited in hilly country at the head of the Hutt River. The township itself lays in a small level plain, but surrounding Sevenhill, particularly to the east and west, are rugged ranges, some scrub covered, which run generally north–south. The district is mainly agricultural, with a mixture of grazing, cropping and vineyards. The township, which has a small population, is on a section of the Main North Road known as the Horrocks Highway.

== Governance ==
Sevenhill is governed at the local level by the District Council of Clare and Gilbert Valleys. Sevenhill lies in the state electoral district of Frome and the federal electoral division of Grey.

== See also ==
- Stanley Football Association
- List of rail trails
- Spring Gully Conservation Park
- "Clare and the Origin of Sevenhill". The Southern Cross (South Australia). Vol. XLVII, no. 2427. South Australia. 6 November 1936. p. 7 – via National Library of Australia. origin of the newspaper articles.
