= Penwortham, South Australia =

Penwortham
- Town
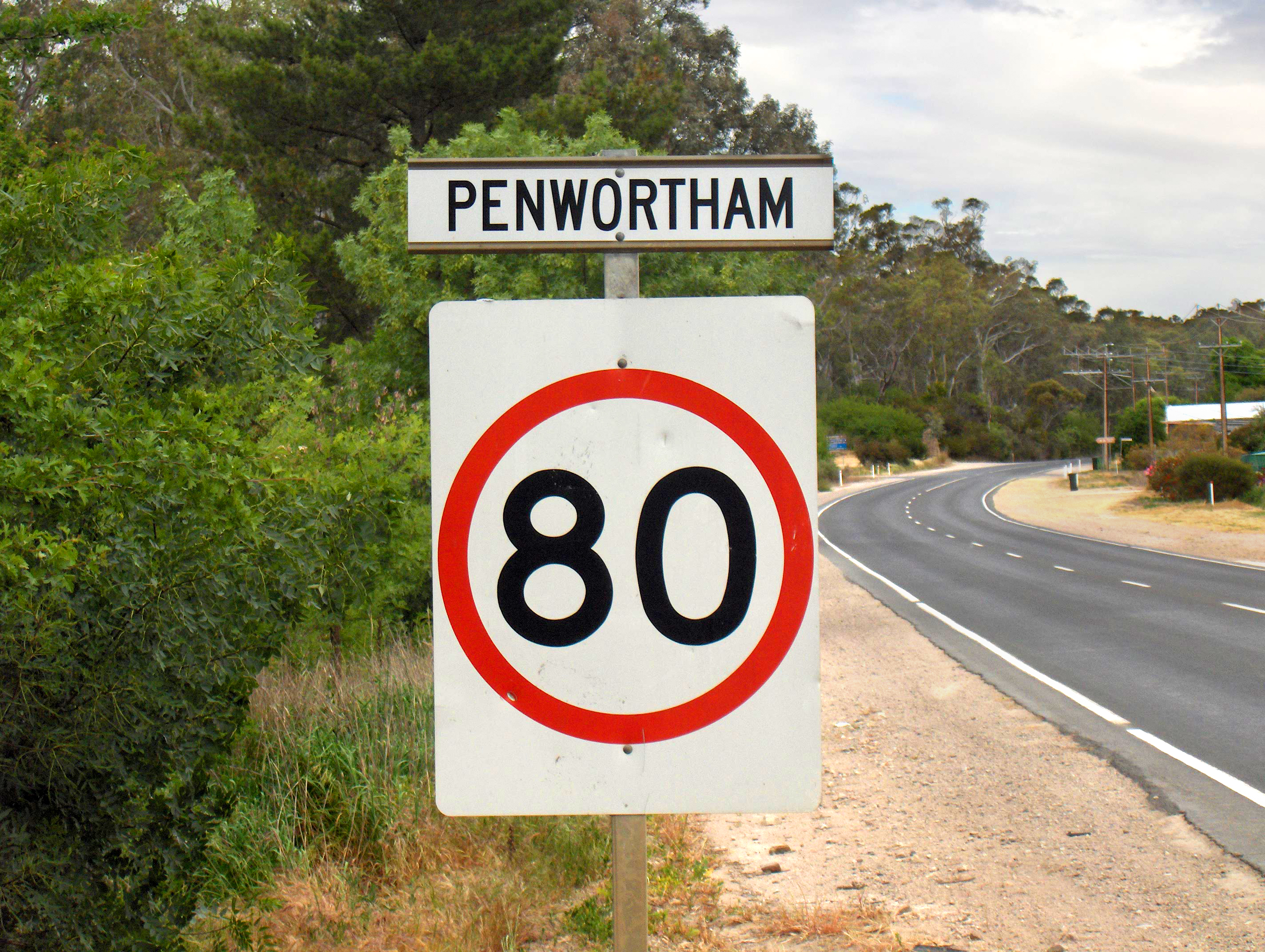
- Northern entrance sign along Horrocks Highway
- Country: Australia
- State: South Australia
- Region: Clare Valley
- LGA: District Council of Clare and Gilbert Valleys
- Location: 124 km (77 mi) north of Adelaide; 10 km (6.2 mi) south of Clare
- Established: 1839

Government
  - Mayor: Allan Aughey
  - State electorate: Frome
  - Federal division: Grey

Population
  - Total: 163 (SAL 2021)
- Postcode: 5453
Localities around Penwortham
Spring Gully	Sevenhill	Polish Hill River
Kybunga	Penwortham	Mintaro
Hoyleton	Watervale; Leasingham	Manoora

Penwortham (33°55′S 138°38′E) is a small town in the Clare Valley, South Australia, along the Horrocks Highway, approximately 10 kilometres south of Clare and 14 kilometres north of Auburn.

== Geography ==
Penwortham is surrounded by natural eucalyptus bushland and a section of the Skilly Hills, which in turn forms part of the Mount Lofty Ranges. There are two significant peaks nearby, Mount Oakden named after John Oakden, and Mount Horrocks, named after John Horrocks. The Hill River rises about 3 kilometres east of Penwortham.

== History ==
The village of Penwortham was founded by settler, pioneer and explorer, John Horrocks (22 March 1818 – 23 September 1846). Horrocks arrived in the colony of South Australia on his 21st birthday, 22 March 1839, less than three years after its proclamation by Governor John Hindmarsh. After meeting Edward John Eyre, who told him of potentially good farmland to the north of Adelaide, John Horrocks and a servant, John Green, set off to find the area Eyre had described to him. Horrocks settled in a region that he believed to be along the Hutt River and named his establishment Hope Farm. Later in 1839, the first stone cottage of the settlement was commenced and, in 1840, Horrocks and his servants built stone stables for horses, which were then very rare and valuable in the new colony. For a short time, this was the only inland European settlement north of Adelaide and Gawler.

The following year saw the completion of an inn, The Derby Arms, which was built to accommodate the many new travellers passing north through Penwortham. The year after that (1842), the first foundations were laid for a flour mill, which did not see full operation until 1856, when all its working parts finally arrived from Europe. 1842 was also the year that the first foundation stone was laid down for the beginning of the manor house at Hope Farm.

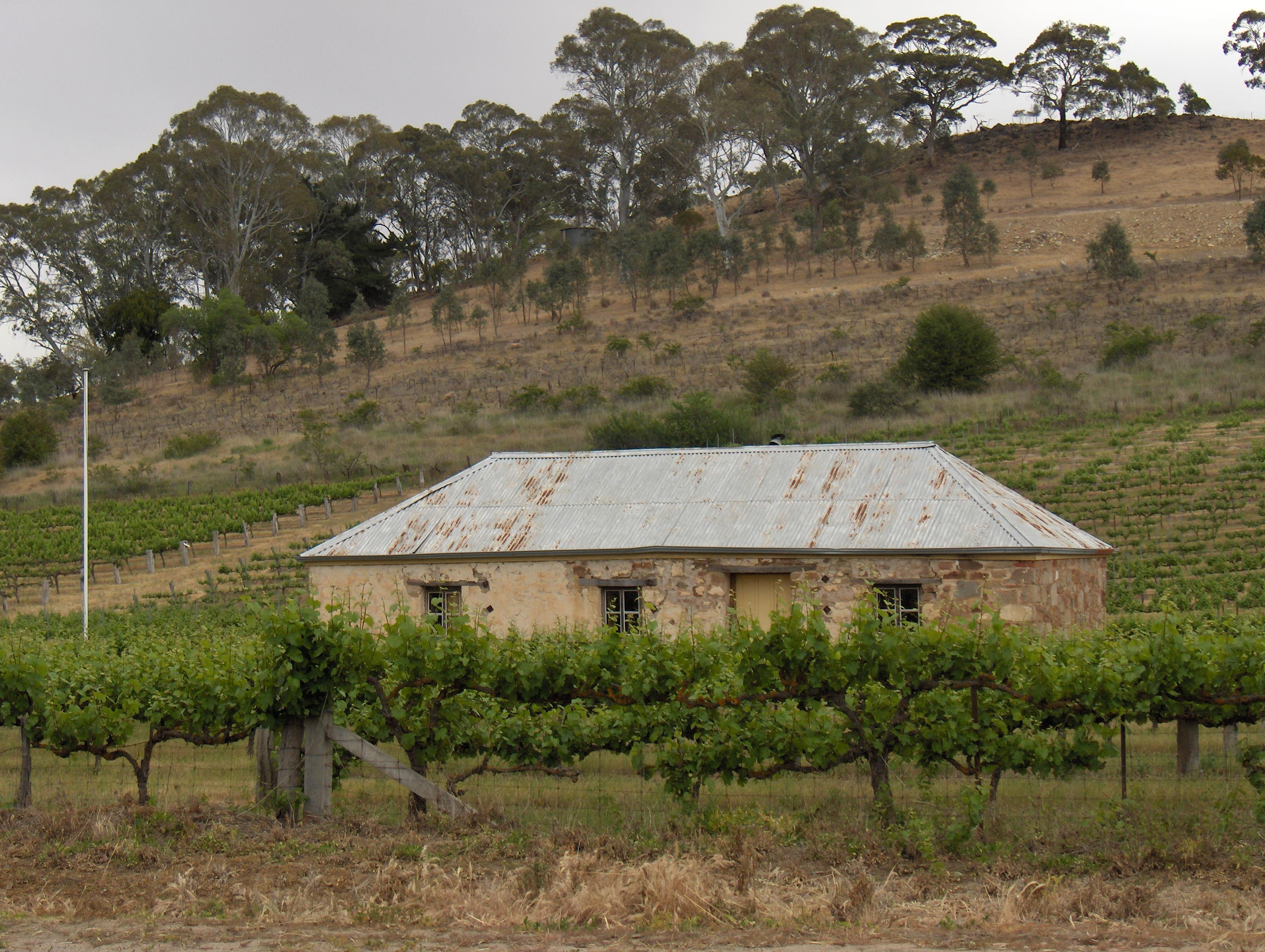
Old cottage located at Penwortham, surrounded by grapevines

Horrocks died in 1846 as a result of a hunting accident at Lake Gill, just north of the present day city of Port Augusta. By that time, Penwortham had become quite an established town and included a butcher, general store, tailor, school and blacksmith. The next year (1847), an unofficial post office began operation, with the local publican, James Bleechmore, acting as postmaster. In 1851, building began on St Mark's Anglican Church. Completion of St Mark's occurred in 1855, with the installation of a bell, turret and porch.

A new era of transport and industry began in 1915, when the construction of the Riverton to Spalding railway line passed through the town. It brought about many changes, and included the demolition of the manor house at Hope Farm, as this was in its direct line. By now, the main industries in the town and surrounding farms were fruit, dried currant and dairy production. These continued until just after the Second World War, when competition from the Riverland meant that a viable industry in the Clare Valley was untenable. As a result, the pre-war advent and post-war continuation of the fledgling wine industry began to flourish in the region.

A monument was built and unveiled on 22 September 1946 commemorating the life, exploration and untimely death of the town's founder, John Ainsworth Horrocks. It was built by Gordon Ross and William Robins and now stands by the side of Main North Road, near St Mark's Church.

== Name ==
Penwortham shares its name with the town of Penwortham in Lancashire, England. Penwortham (in the United Kingdom) was the home of Richard Arkwright, the inventor of the water frame that kick-started the textile industry in the late 18th century. John Horrocks is likely to have been a descendant of Arkwright. Penwortham is a town name with a precise meaning: a settlement on a hill by a ford. Horrocks originally called his settlement Penwortham-on-the-Hill. He was born at his family home of Penwortham Hall, near Preston, Lancashire. The name is a hybrid of the Welsh pen, meaning headland and an Old English word worphamm, meaning enclosed homestead.

== The town today ==
St Mark's Anglican Church—opened 30 November, 1851—is accompanied by an adjacent cemetery which houses the graves of several early settlers including John Horrocks.

John Horrocks' State Heritage listed cottage—built in 1839—is owned and operated by the local historical society. The cottage opens to visitors on the first Sunday of each month, with alternative viewing opportunities available by appointment. The cottage is distinguished as the oldest stone building in South Australia north of Gawler. Recent restoration efforts have worked to preserve its original architectural features and historical integrity. The cottage is accompanied by a restored stone outbuilding, housing a curated collection of historical photography and literature.

The Riesling Trail is a 35 kilometer rail trail walkers and cyclists passing to the east of Penwortham, linking the village to Auburn and Clare via the countryside and several cellar doors and other attractions. A monument to John Horrocks stands near the trail and St Marks.

The scenic drive to the Skillogalee Valley, west of the Main North Road (Horrocks Highway), can be accessed from Penwortham. The drive runs past several well-known cellar doors, including Mitchell Wines, Penna Lane Wines, Kilikanoon Wines, and Skillogalee Wines and Restaurant. Closer to town, Pearson Vineyard is located on Main North Road in an old stone building with a cellar door.

The UPPside European Restaurant serves an array of European cuisines. It has been recognised through several awards, such as 'Best European Restaurant' in LUXlife Magazine's 2026 Travel and Tourism Awards.

== Governance ==
Penwortham is in the District Council of Clare and Gilbert Valleys, the state electoral district of Frome, and the Australian House of Representatives Division of Grey.
