= Broughton River (South Australia) =

Broughton
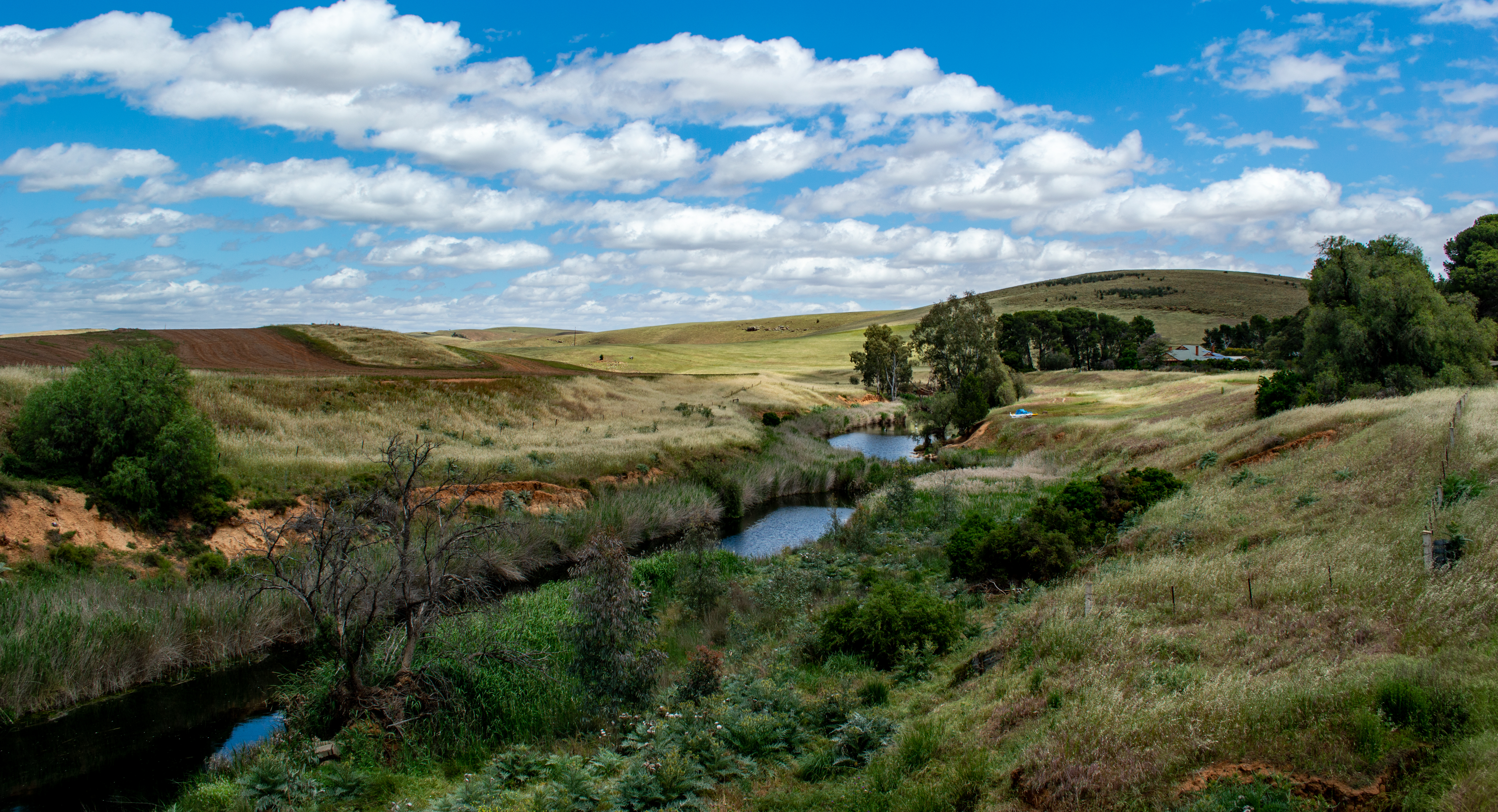
- The Broughton River south of Spalding

- Location of the river mouth in South Australia
- Etymology: William Broughton

Location
- Country: Australia
- State: South Australia

Physical characteristics
- Source
  - location: Spalding
  - coordinates: 33.52°S 138.62°E
  - elevation: 339 m (1,112 ft)
- Mouth: Spencer Gulf
  - location: Port Davis
  - coordinates: 33.25°S 137.82°E
  - elevation: 0 m (0 ft)
- Length: 110 km (68 mi)
- Basin size: 5,671 km^{2} (2,190 sq mi)

Basin features
- Tributaries
  - left: Yakillo Creek, Hill River, Hutt River
  - right: Freshwater Creek, Bundaleer Creek, Rocky River, Crystal Brook
- Waterholes: Beetaloo Reservoir; Bundaleer Reservoir

The Broughton River is a river in the Australian state of South Australia.

== Course ==
The river flows from the junction of the Hill River and the Yakillo Creek immediately south of Spalding in a westerly direction towards Spencer Gulf. Its mouth is located in the gazetted locality of Port Davis about 40 kilometres (25 mi) north of Port Broughton and 20 kilometres (12 mi) south west of Port Pirie.

Tributaries of the Broughton include Freshwater Creek, Bundaleer Creek, the Rocky River, Crystal Brook, Yakillo Creek, the Hill River and the Hutt River. The river descends 292 metres (958 ft) over its 110-kilometre (68 mi) course.

== History ==
The river was named in May 1839 in honour of the Anglican cleric, William Broughton, by the explorer, Edward John Eyre.

== See also ==
- Rivers of South Australia
