= Hill River (South Australia) =

Hill
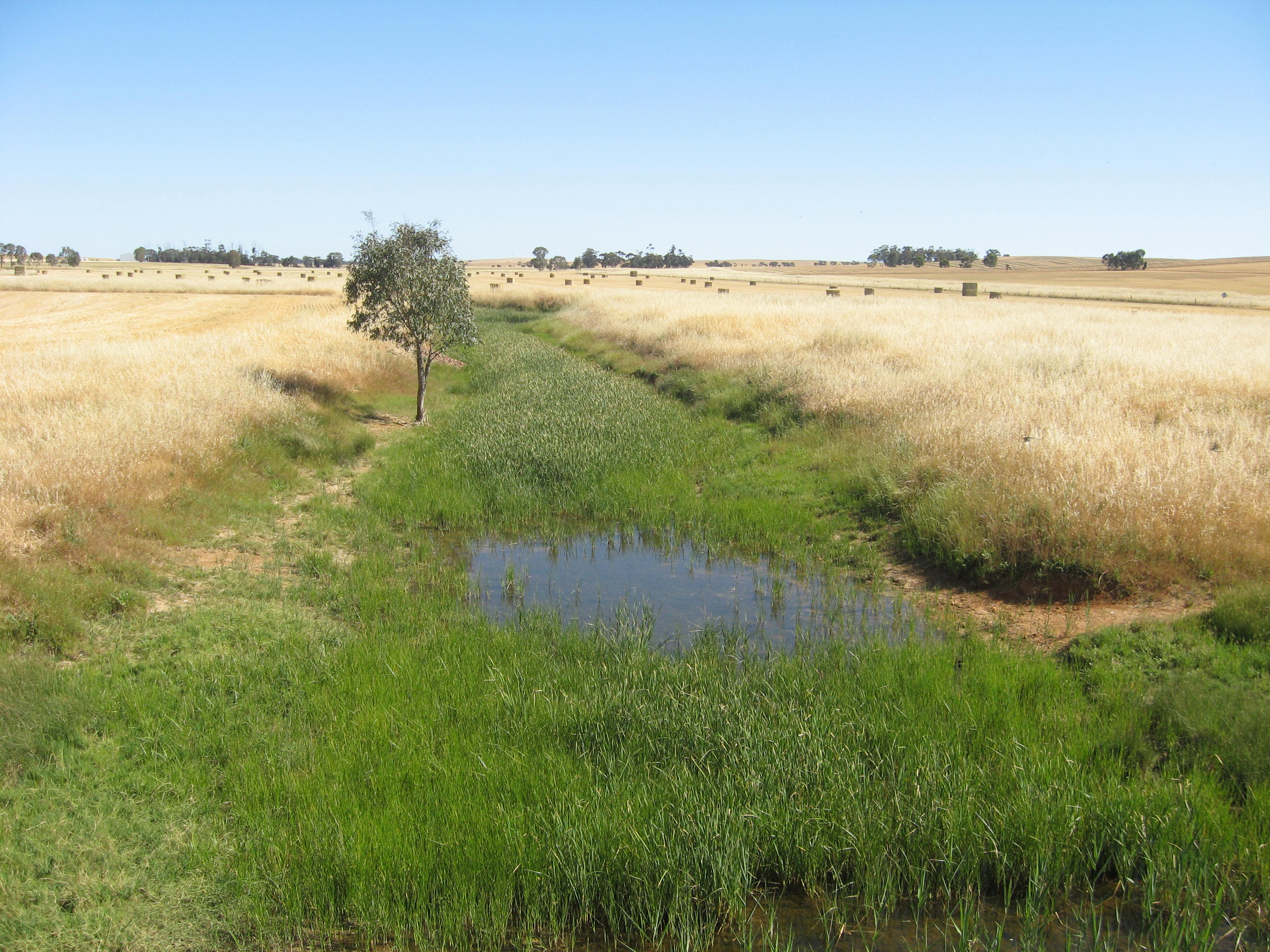
- An upstream view of the Hill River

- Location of the river mouth in South Australia
- Etymology: John Hill

Location
- Country: Australia
- State: South Australia
- Region: Mid North

Physical characteristics
- Source
  - location: near Penwortham
  - elevation: 341 m (1,119 ft)
- Mouth: confluence with the Broughton River
  - coordinates: 33°31′39″S 138°37′34″E
  - elevation: 296 m (971 ft)
- Length: 37 km (23 mi)
- Basin size: 230 km^{2} (89 sq mi)

Basin features
- River system: Broughton River
- Waterhole: Beetaloo Reservoir

The Hill River is an ephemeral river located in the Mid North region of the Australian state of South Australia.

== Course and features ==
The Hill River rises about 3 kilometres (1.9 mi) east of Penwortham and then flows northward for about 37 kilometres (23 mi). Hill River runs roughly parallel to Hutt River, approximately 3 kilometres (1.9 mi) to the west. Near the town of Spalding Hill River becomes a tributary of the Broughton River shortly before the Hutt merges also.

The Hill River drains a catchment area of 230 square kilometres (89 sq mi). Flows which are intermittent, can result from either winter rains or local thunderstorms. The average annual observed flow in 2000–04 was 2,568 megalitres (90.7×10^{6} cu ft). Most of the catchment emanates from the Camels Hump Range and to a lesser degree from the Stony Range. Slab Hut Creek is amongst the more significant tributaries. The river has a low gradient which, combined with a broad and shallow catchment valley, renders it unsuitable as the site of any significant reservoir. In some areas the clearing of native vegetation has led to erosion and steep banks. The Hill River also gives its name to the locality of Hill River, which is within the District Council of Clare and Gilbert Valleys.

== History ==
For over 100 years the date of European discovery and name origin for the river was confused. In the absence of proper research, several false attributions became accepted. According to (incorrect) state government sources, the river was discovered by an obscure 'William' Hill in 1838 and named for Rowland Hill, the secretary of the South Australian Colonization Commission from 1833 until 1837.

According to Edward John Eyre, he discovered the river in 1839 and named it after explorer John Hill because he was "the gentleman who discovered its twin river, the Hutt". John Hill was the first European to explore the nearby Clare Valley. He sighted and named several important rivers of South Australia, including the adjacent Hutt River and Wakefield River. A 1908 news article conversely credits the obscure William Hill with naming Hill River after himself.

The issue was finally resolved in 2015 with the publication of John Hill : South Australia's Discoverer of Rivers, which emphatically concludes that Eyre discovered the river on 5 June 1839 and named it after John Hill, the explorer who discovered the Clare Valley

== See also ==
- Rivers of South Australia
- Polish Hill River, South Australia
- Hill River, South Australia
- Hilltown, South Australia
