= John Hill (explorer) =

English explorer of South Australia (c. 1810–1860)

John Hill (c. 1810 – 11 August 1860) was an English explorer of South Australia and part of the European exploration of Australia. Hill was the first European to see and traverse the Clare Valley.

An enigmatic and little-known individual, during the late 1830s John Hill sighted and named several important rivers of South Australia, as well as many lesser streams and creeks. The former unquestionably include the Wakefield and Hutt rivers, plus (most probably) the Gilbert and Light rivers. He was also the first European to explore the headwaters of the Torrens and Onkaparinga rivers.

In 1908 the Register newspaper (while incorrectly naming him 'William') accorded him the title of South Australia's "Discoverer of Rivers". Hill River and Mount Hill are named after him.

== Early life in London and New South Wales ==
Born about 1810 in London, UK, nothing is known of his ancestry or childhood. Emerging from an apparently affluent family, in the mid-1830s he arrived at Sydney as a well-educated and financially independent young man. Undertaking pastoralism pursuits in the Monaro region, by 1837 he had travelled extensively throughout that colony, becoming acquainted with such fellow pastoralists as Edward John Eyre, and of Dr. George Imlay, one of three land-owning brothers from Eden district. According to one account he owned 'extensive herds' in the Bathurst district.

Attracted to the possibilities for pastoralism and land speculation in the nascent colony of South Australia (founded nine months earlier), he arrived there on 5 September 1837 aboard the schooner Currency Lass, accompanied by James Fisher, son of James Hurtle Fisher. During the next four years, either alone or with associates, Hill actively engaged in the exploration of the province, particularly in what became the highly productive, closer-settled districts. Hill's first priority was to reconnoitre a viable route for overlanding livestock from New South Wales, particularly through the Mount Lofty Ranges, which was the unexplored gap between the Murray River and Adelaide.

== Exploration of Mount Lofty Ranges ==
=== Barossa Valley ===
From 11 to 17 December 1837 Hill was in the party that accompanied William Light in his expedition that came across and named the Barossa Range, ergo the Barossa Valley. A few weeks later, on 1 and 2 January 1838, Hill's Arabian stallion Rainbow participated at the first horse racing event held in South Australia.

=== Central Mount Lofty Ranges ===
From 23 to 26 January 1838, John Hill and Dr George Imlay were the first Europeans to cross and re-cross the central Mount Lofty Ranges. Commencing from the Torrens Gorge at Athelstone they explored the headwaters of this river, passing through the Birdwood and Palmer districts, to reach the Murray River at Mannum.

During their return journey, which was to the south of their outward trek, they sighted Mount Beevor and Mount Torrens. They then sighted and traversed the sources of the Onkaparinga River through Oakbank and Woodside, before returning to Adelaide through the Basket Range, Norton Summit and Magill districts. Despite seeing and describing many important geographical features within the region, they did not bestow any placenames.

=== North Mount Lofty Ranges ===
Between 1 and 12 March 1838, Hill led a party of four young pastoralists (including John Oakden) who became the first Europeans to reach the Riverland region of the Murray River since Sturt's party had explored it by rowboat in 1830, and were the first to do so overland, whether from Adelaide or the eastern colonies (thereby beating Hawdon and Bonney to this region).

In doing so they were also the first Europeans to see and traverse the districts of Cockatoo Valley (which they named), Nuriootpa, Kapunda, Eudunda, Robertstown, and North West Bend near Morgan. On 3 March 1838, along their route, they encountered and named the Light River.

== Permanent move to South Australia ==
Having carefully completed the groundwork for overlanding, from March to May 1838 Hill was engaged in importing livestock by sea from New South Wales, during which period he decided to permanently establish himself in South Australia. While Hill was thus engaged, in April 1838 Hawdon and Bonney had dared and succeeded at being the first overlanders. Having lost the race to be the first livestock overlander, Hill then turned his talents toward pure exploration.

== Exploration of the Mid North ==
John Hill's crowning achievement came when he conducted a private (and possibly solo) exploration in early April 1839, on horseback, northward from Adelaide to South Australia's Mid North, encountering and naming both the Wakefield River, and the Hutt River.

In doing so he was also the first European to encounter and traverse the Clare Valley. His optimistic reports later gave rise to European settlement there through a special survey by a syndicate of nine investors, most being connected to the London-based Secondary Towns Association, including such settlers as Horrocks and Gleeson. On that same expedition Hill likely passed by the Gilbert River, naming it after a close associate, Thomas Gilbert.

Motivated (and guided) by Hill's explorations, Edward John Eyre subsequently explored the same region and on 5 June 1839 encountered the Hill River, naming it after John Hill, 'the gentleman who discovered its twin [river], the Hutt'.

By then Hill was a prominent citizen of Adelaide. Immediately following his Clare Valley exploration he became closely involved with John Morphett, Adelaide-based agent for the Secondary Towns Association. Hill next conducted four exploratory expeditions either directly or indirectly on behalf of that Association, searching for suitable sites to establish speculative towns secondary to the capital, Adelaide. For reasons of competitive advantage the results of these explorations were usually confidential, being provided only to the Association's Board in London, or to the local government, but were only rarely provided to newspapers for publication.

== Explorations of Eyre Peninsula, Yorke Peninsula, and the South East ==
The first such exploration was to Eyre Peninsula during August–September 1839, in company with Samuel Stephens. Using the chartered brig Rapid as a base, they were the first Europeans to explore the hinterland of Streaky Bay and Denial Bay.

In December 1839, again using a chartered vessel, the Hero under Captain John Hart, Hill explored the hinterland of the Limestone Coast at Robe and the Glenelg River but found no sites suitable for the Association's purposes.

In April 1840, Hill accompanied Governor Gawler to explore the Spencer Gulf coast of Eyre Peninsula on horseback, they being the first Europeans to traverse the landward regions of this coast between Port Lincoln and the Middleback Ranges near Whyalla. They roughly followed the route of the present Lincoln Highway. During this expedition Gawler named Mount Hill after him, as well as naming other features such as Franklin Harbour at Cowell. Embarking at Cowell, Gawler returned from this expedition in the brig Porter. Meanwhile, Hill was dropped off on 28 April 1840 by the government cutter Water Witch at 15 km south of Point Riley near Wallaroo. Accompanied by Deputy Surveyor-General Thomas Burr, Hill returned to Adelaide on horseback, the pair being the first Europeans to traverse Northern Yorke Peninsula, reporting that they had discovered extensive fertile land.

In January–February 1841, accompanied by Secondary Towns official George Morphett, Hill explored the arid plains due north of Morgan, toward the vicinity of Yunta, searching for a reported fertile region, but found only hardship and disappointment.

John Hill made several speculative land investments in Adelaide and at Yorke Peninsula. The most significant was in May 1841 when he was the original purchaser of the land grant for Section 2112, being 134 acres comprising all of modern Port Adelaide southward of St Vincent Street. Hill sold this at a loss in July 1843 when a financial crisis beset the colony, he having already returned to London in January 1843 aboard the barque Sarah and Elizabeth. He had also lost money in other land speculations.

== Later life ==
John Hill enjoyed high social status in South Australia until 1843, being appointed to grand juries and influential commercial positions, although never holding public office. In contrast, after 1843 Hill played no further prominent part in the colony's affairs. Sapped by financial misfortune, his life then became enigmatic. He returned to Adelaide around 1845 but lived in almost total obscurity. Although this was possibly self-imposed, former associates evidently regarded him as a social outcast. Hill died at the Adelaide Hospital on 11 August 1860, aged 50, from an ulcer related condition, and was interred in an unmarked paupers' grave at West Terrace Cemetery. There is no record that he had ever married.

== Legacy ==
From 1837 to 1843 John Hill was a leading South Australian citizen, explorer, and pioneer. He made numerous explorations beyond the frontier of European settlement, encountering and (sometimes) naming important geographical features, despite being generally reticent to engage in toponymy, while having some features named after him by others. On other expeditions, although finding little of geographical significance, he nevertheless revealed sizeable areas of formerly unknown wilderness to the colonists.

His personal courage as an explorer is undoubted, but he often failed to adequately record and proclaim his sightings, thereby failing to gain recognition for them. For well over a century there was much confusion and incorrect attribution among historians concerning his name and achievements until a research paper published in 2013, released as a book in 2015, convincingly identified and documented him.
