= John Ainsworth Horrocks =

Australian explorer

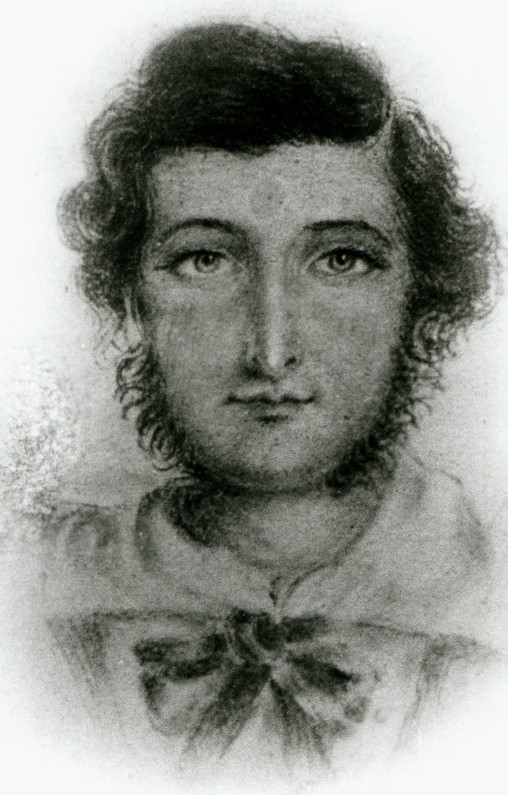
- Born: 22 March 1818; Preston, Lancashire, England
- Died: 23 September 1846 (aged 28); Penwortham, South Australia, Australia
- Occupations: Explorer of South Australia, Pastoralist

John Ainsworth Horrocks (22 March 1818 – 23 September 1846) was an English pastoralist and explorer who was one of the first European settlers in the Clare Valley of South Australia where, in 1840, he established the village of Penwortham.

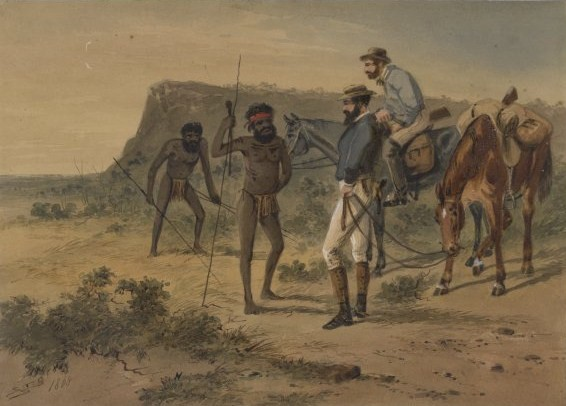
Horrocks first interview (1868) by S. T. Gill

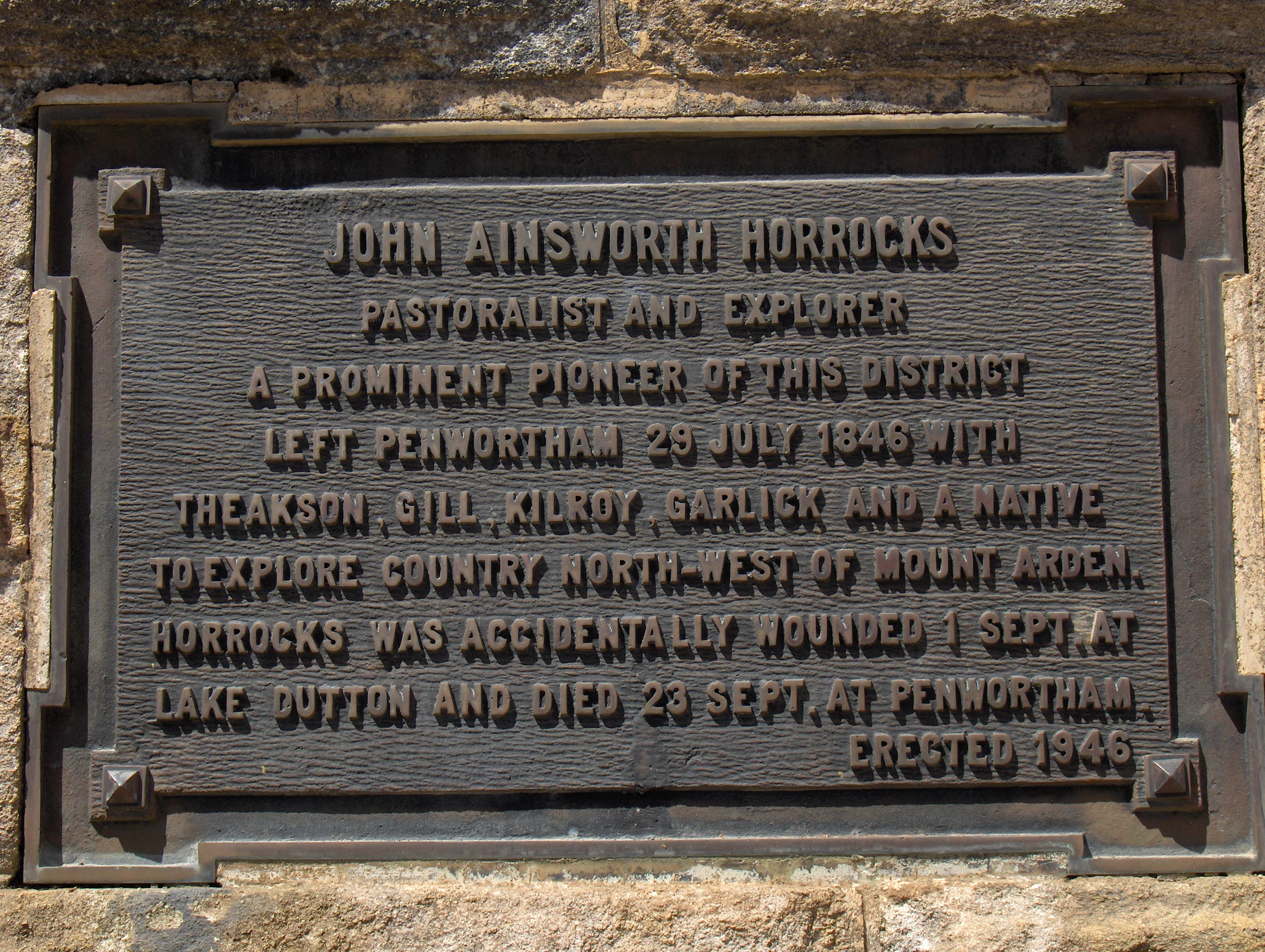
John Horrocks monument at Penwortham, South Australia

== Biography ==
Horrocks was born on Easter Sunday, 22 March 1818, at Penwortham Lodge, near Preston, Lancashire. His father Peter Horrocks, a son of John Horrocks, was an investor/shareholder in the Secondary Towns Association, which aspired to develop towns in the new colony of South Australia. John Ainsworth Horrocks, aged 21, and his brother Eustace, aged 16, arrived at Adelaide in March 1839. Impatient to settle on their own land, the brothers set up camp on 16 January 1840 at present Penwortham, a village which they founded and named.

He returned to England in 1842 after his father's death, and then went back to Australia in 1844 to attend to financial problems.

=== Fatal expedition ===
On 29 July 1846 he commenced an exploratory expedition into the far north-west of South Australia, aiming for distant hills near Lake Torrens, hoping to find good agricultural land. His second in command was John Henry Theakston (d.1878), a surveyor who in 1844 had served dutifully as second in command of the ill-fated Darke expedition. An unpaid volunteer in the party was artist and amateur botanist Samuel Thomas Gill. The several hired men included Bernard Kilcoy as cook and driver, and goatherd Jimmy Moorhouse, a young Aboriginal employee at his Penwortham station.

On 1 September, near Lake Dutton, still short of his objective, Horrocks was accidentally shot while reloading his shotgun, one barrel of which was tripped by the packload of a kneeling camel known as Harry, which had been the first camel to arrive in Australia. His injuries included loss of the middle finger of the right hand and a row of teeth from the right upper jaw. The expedition was abandoned and the party returned to Horrocks's home at Penwortham, where he died of his wounds on 23 September. On Horrocks's order, the camel, which had previously attacked other animals and humans, was shot dead.

Horrocks is buried at St. Mark's Anglican Church, the land for which he had earlier donated to the town.

== Legacy ==
Although Horrocks's expedition thus failed to reach its objective, in 1851 this was achieved by Horrocks's close associate John Jackson Oakden.

Horrocks gave his name to several geographical features in the vicinity of Mount Remarkable and the Clare Valley, such as Horrocks Pass near Mount Remarkable and Mount Horrocks near Clare. Main North Road from Gawler to Wilmington and the Wilmington to Quorn road were renamed Horrocks Highway in 2011.

A short biography published in 1906 was derived from Horrocks's diary plus notes written by his sister.

== See also ==
- Horrocks Highway
