= Hutt River (South Australia) =

Hutt
- Location of the river mouth in South Australia
- Etymology: Sir William Hutt
- Native name: Parriworta (Kaurna)

Location
- Country: Australia
- State: South Australia
- Region: Mid North, Clare Valley

Physical characteristics
- Source: Skilly Hills
  - location: below Atherley, Clare Valley
  - elevation: 396 m (1,299 ft)
- Mouth: confluence with the Broughton River
  - location: south of Spalding
  - coordinates: 33°31′36″S 138°35′53″E
  - elevation: 256 m (840 ft)
- Length: 39 km (24 mi)
- Basin size: 280 km^{2} (110 sq mi)

Basin features
- River system: Broughton River

The Hutt River (Kaurna: Parriworta) is a river in the Mid North and Clare Valley regions of the Australian state of South Australia.

== Course and features ==
The river rises near Sevenhill and flows generally in a northern direction through the town of Clare and through good farming and pastoral country before reaching its confluence with the Broughton River south of Spalding. The river descends 129 metres (423 ft) over its 39-kilometre (24 mi) course.

The Hutt River catchment has five catchment sub-regions; Hutt River, Stanley Flat, Armagh Creek, White Hutt Creek, and Bungaree. Armagh Creek is the most significant tributary. The twin of the Hutt River, running parallel to it but separated by a low range, is the Hill River.

== History ==
It is one of several Mid North streams visited in early April 1839 by explorer John Hill. Hill named the river after Sir William Hutt, who was one of the South Australian Colonization Commissioners in London. Sir William's brother John Hutt was originally recommended to become the first Governor of South Australia, but he turned it down in favour of John Hindmarsh. John Hutt later became Governor of Western Australia from 1839 until 1846.

Hill traced the Hutt downstream to just below the present town of Clare. In late May 1839, based upon information supplied by Hill, the explorer Edward John Eyre followed in Hill's footsteps, tracing it downstream to its junction with the Broughton River.

== See also ==
- List of rivers of Australia § South Australia
