= Clare Valley =

- Region
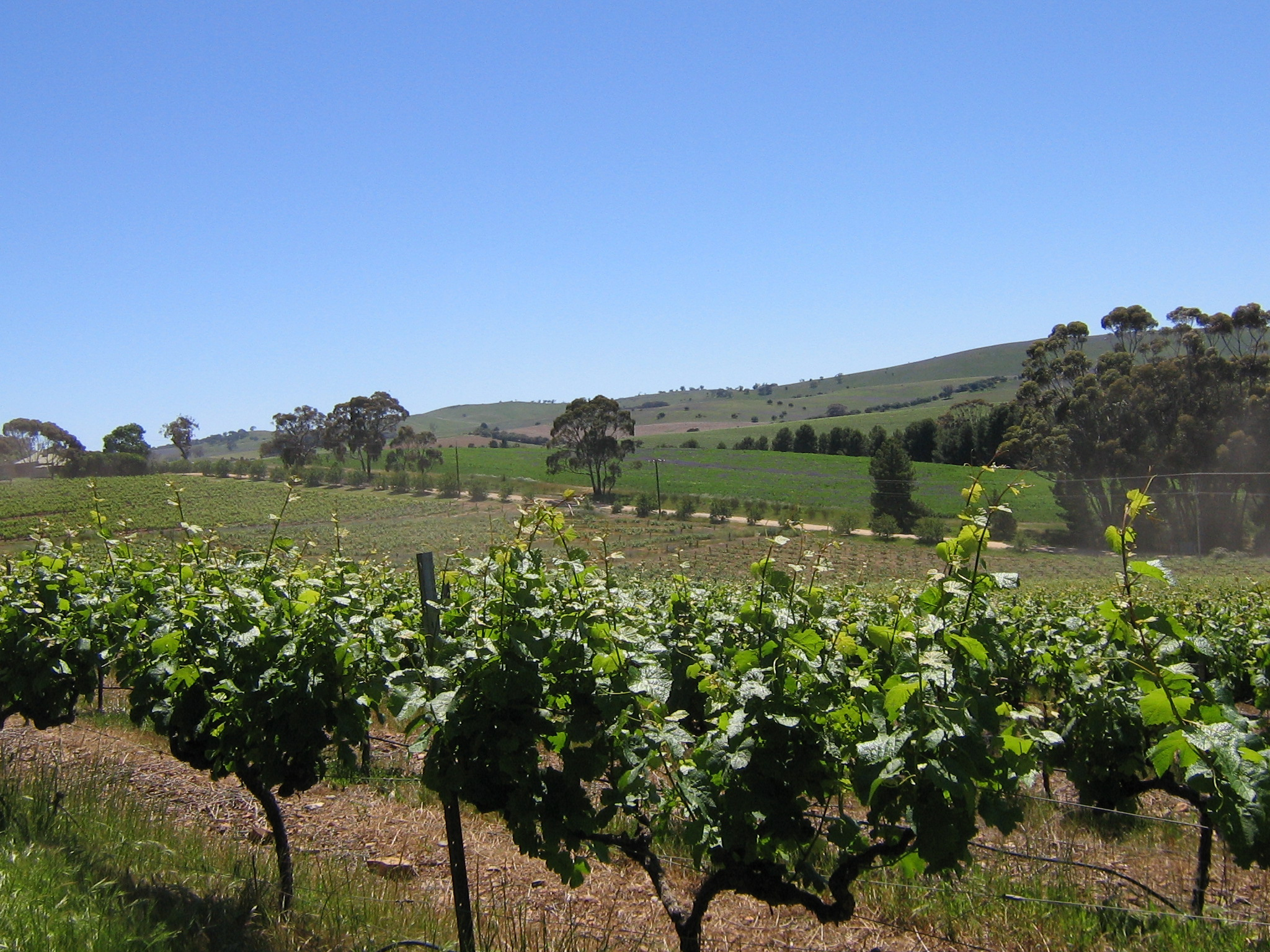

- Coordinates: 33°50′1″S 138°36′36″E
- Country: Australia
- State: South Australia
- Region: Yorke and Mid North
- LGA: District Council of Clare and Gilbert Valleys

Government
  - State electorate: Frome
  - Federal division: Grey
- County: County of Stanley

The Clare Valley is a valley located in South Australia about 100 kilometres (62 miles) north of Adelaide in the Clare and Gilbert Valleys council area. It is the river valley formed by the Hutt River but is also strongly associated with the roughly parallel Hill River. The valley is traversed by the Horrocks Highway and the towns in the valley along that route from south to north are Auburn, Leasingham, Watervale, Penwortham, Sevenhill and Clare. The geographical feature has given rise to the Clare Valley wine region designation, a notable winegrowing region of Australia.

== Geography ==
The valley is formed by the Skilly Hills and Bungaree Hills on the west with the Stony Range rising on the valley's east. The Temperate Grassland of South Australia cover most of the area.

== History ==
=== Pre-European settlement ===
The original inhabitants of the Clare Valley were the Ngadjuri people. It is believed that they had major camping sites at Clare and Auburn, as well as other areas outside the valley.

=== European settlement ===
The first European to reportedly explore the Clare Valley was John Hill, who did so in early April 1839, visiting and naming the Hutt River. Its nearby twin, the Hill River, was later named in his honour. On returning to Adelaide, he reported his findings of potentially good farmland to his friend and associate, Edward John Eyre. Eyre in turn informed John Horrocks, who had only arrived in South Australia during March 1839. Eyre later explored the Clare Valley on the return journey from his second 1839 expedition to the northern regions of South Australia. Horrocks set out with his servant, John Green and established himself in the area now known as Penwortham. This became the first permanent settlement in the valley.

By 1840, Edward Burton Gleeson had set up the Inchiquin pastoral run to the north which was later developed into the town of Clare and in 1848, Jesuits were settling into the place which would become the town of Sevenhill. Settlers came from places including England, Ireland, Poland and Silesia during the 1840s, producing a rich heritage of architecture and villages, which remain largely intact. Vineyards were planted alongside those first villages and winemaking has continued ever since.

=== Modern times ===
On 16 February 1983, the Clare Valley was affected by the Ash Wednesday bushfires. Although there were no fatalities in the area, over 6,100 hectares were burnt out, causing $5 million worth of damage. The railway line between the Clare Showgrounds and Penwortham was severely damaged, and resulted in its eventual demise. The old rail route has since been transformed into a bicycle and walking track known as the Riesling Trail. This 35 km sealed trail links the villages of the valley.

== Attractions ==
The Clare Valley is a popular wine tourism destination. Known for its cool climate white wines, most notably its Riesling, it is home to an estimated 50 wineries throughout the region. Some of its most well known and popular wineries include Taylors Wines, Annie's Lane, Grosset Wines, Jim Barry Wines, Seven Hill Cellars, Kilikanoon and Skillogalee. Kilikanoon (2013) and Jim Barry Wines (2020) won James Halliday's Winery of the Year award.

Held in late May, after harvest, the Clare Valley Gourmet Weekend is a festival celebrating food and wine. It is spread over three days, with many of the local wineries and restaurants hosting events, tastings and music.

The Clare Valley is also known for its walking and cycling trails being home to stretches of the Riesling Trail, Rattler Trail, Mawson Trail and Lavender Federation Trail.

=== Blenheim Festival ===
The Blenheim Music and Camping Festival, a two-day music festival, was an annual event between 2009 and 2018. The Shaolin Afronauts, Max Savage and the False Idols, Tony Joe White, Marlon Williams, Timberwolf and Kaurna Cronin played at the 2015 event.

The festival organisers decided to take a break in 2019, to allow the property to regenerate after prolonged drought and the impact of people camping in the paddocks. It was intended to run its 10th event over the Easter weekend in 2020; however the restrictions enforced owing to the COVID-19 pandemic in Australia prevented this.

== See also ==
- Clare Valley wine region
- Riesling Trail
