= Auburn railway station, South Australia =

Former railway station in South Australia, Australia

Auburn
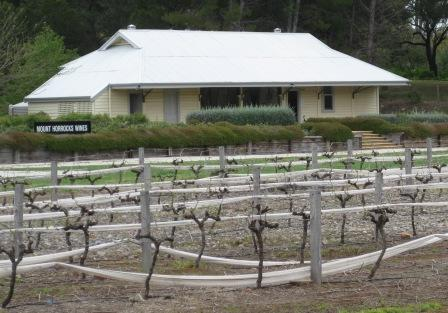
- Auburn railway station, restored as the Mount Horrocks Wines cellar door (29 September 2009)

General information
- Location: Stanley Street, Auburn, South Australia
- Coordinates: 34.02498665947038°S 138.68936135017697°E
- Operator: South Australian Railways
- Line: Spalding line
- Distance: 119 kilometres from Adelaide
- Platforms: 2
- Tracks: 2

Construction
- Structure type: Ground

Other information
- Status: Closed to passengers, repurposed as a wine tasting venue

History
- Opened: 5 July 1918
- Closed: 24 May 1954 (passengers); February 1983 (freight)
Location

Auburn railway station was located on the Spalding railway line. It served the town of Auburn, South Australia.

== History ==
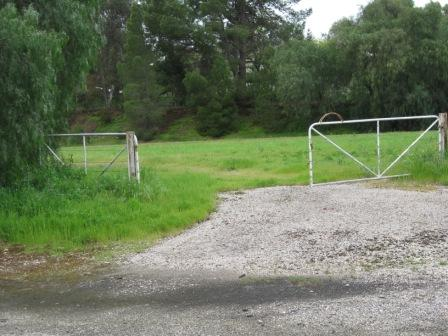
Old gates for the former railway yards at Auburn Now part of the Riesling Trail (September 2009)

Auburn railway station opened on 5 July 1918 with the opening of the railway line between Riverton and Clare (later extended to Spalding on 9 January 1922). The station consisted of a railway yard, a goods shed and a station building.

The station closed to regular passengers on 24 May 1954, with the service being replaced by a co-ordinated road-bus service serving Jamestown and the towns along the Spalding railway line, to connect with trains at Riverton.

In July 1978, the station and the line's associated infrastructure was transferred from South Australian Railways to Australian National. Rail services through Auburn ceased in February 1983 as a result of track damage between the towns of Sevenhill and Penwortham, which caused the demise of the railway. The line was formally closed on 17 April 1984.

== Restoration ==
After the closure of the line between Riverton and Spalding, for many years, the station fell into a state of disrepair. In April 1998, the station was restored as the Mount Horrocks Wines cellar door venue following substantial renovation. In 2000, vineyards were planted at the station. In 2010, the 19 kilometres (12 mi) section from Riverton through Rhynie to Auburn was subsequently redeveloped as the Rattler Rail Trail and opened in 2010. The original 33 km (21 mi) section from Auburn through the Clare Valley to Clare and beyond was extended northwards to the former Barinia siding, and was opened in November 2009.
