= Riverton, South Australia =

Riverton
- Town
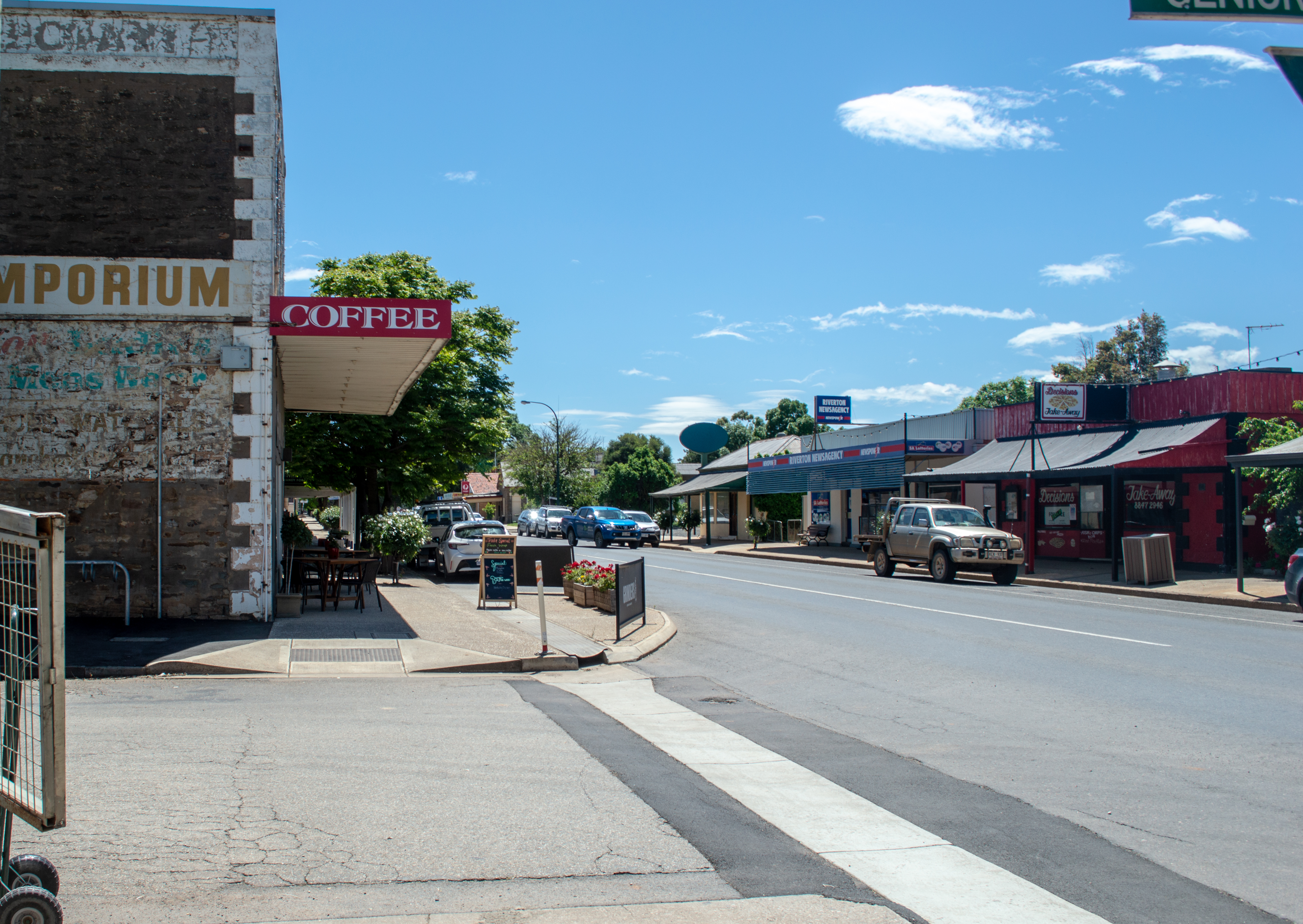
- Torrens Road, Riverton

- Coordinates: 34°09′28″S 138°44′50″E
- Country: Australia
- State: South Australia
- Region: Mid North
- LGA: District Council of Clare and Gilbert Valleys
- Location: 94 km (58 mi) N of Adelaide; 62 km (39 mi) S of Burra; 52 km (32 mi) N of Gawler
- Established: 1856

Government
  - State electorate: Frome
  - Federal division: Grey

Population
  - Total: 795 (UCL 2021)
Localities around Riverton
Undalya	Saddleworth	Steelton
Rhynie	Riverton	Marrabel, Hamilton
Salter Springs	Tarlee, Giles Corner	Allendale North

Riverton is a small town in the Mid North of South Australia, in the Gilbert Valley. It is situated on the Gilbert River, from which the town derives its name. Both the Gilbert Valley and Gilbert River were named after the South Australian pioneer Thomas Gilbert. Riverton was first settled in 1856, as a settlement along the bullock track from the mining town of Burra to the capital city Adelaide. It grew from a plan designed by a James Masters who had established the nearby town of Saddleworth. The streets of Riverton received their names chiefly from James Masters and his friends. They commemorate persons notable in the history of the district or the state. At the 2011 census, Riverton had a population of 810. Including the rural areas surrounding the town, the population was 1213.

== First storekeeper ==
The first storekeeper in the town, John Jubb Horner, arrived in South Australia in 1853 and soon made his way with his family to Riverton. His store, built in the early 1850s, was situated at the south end of the town. His store was the commercial emporium of Riverton, where the settlers would gather for social purposes as well as business. This store was also the original Post Office, Telegraph Office, and registry for births, deaths and marriages. The only other shop in the town in the early 1850s was owned by a cobbler, Mister Payne.

The Riverton Hotel, originally known as the Riverton Arms, opened for business in 1855, although the building was not completed until 1857. This hotel, and the abovemention two shops, were the only business places in 1857.

Local Government was proclaimed in July 1866, the first Court House and Police Station were opened that same year, the new Post Office and the Community Hall were both built in 1874.

== Minerals ==
In 1897, it was reported that miners were engaged in opening up a mineral show in the hills about 5 miles (8 km) east of Riverton, resulting in what appeared to be a permanent lode of copper and silver lead. Samples were sent for assaying and the results were promising, silver and lead definitely being present. However no developments took place, which indicates that the lode could not have been as extensive as appeared at first. Even by 1965, fossickers still gleaned a little from this mineral deposit.

== Railway ==
The transport problems for the Kapunda miners were eased in 1860 when the railway reached there. The question was whether the line should continue from Kapunda northwards along the valley of the River Light to Burra, or whether another line should stretch northwards from Gawler through the Gilbert Valley. The authorities decided on the latter route because it would open up thousands of acres of good agricultural land, encouraging the establishment of new towns along the route.

That was a fortunate decision for Riverton. The Peterborough railway line was opened to Tarlee in 1868, Riverton on 20 December 1869 and Manoora in 1870.

Railway workshops were immediately set up in Riverton. This swelled the population and sharply increased trade generally in the town. However, the workshops closed in 1878.

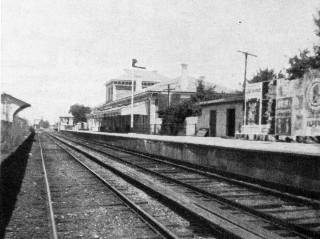
Riverton Railway Station

In 1918, the branch line to Clare was opened, which later extended to Spalding. This branch made it necessary for more railway employees to live at Riverton. In 1965, there were 25 railway employees and their families living there.

Riverton station was the scene of an attempted mass shooting in 1921. A passenger who was travelling on the Broken Hill Express from Adelaide fired a number of shots into the dining room, and Percy Brookfield, the Member of Parliament for Broken Hill, was shot and killed when he tried to disarm the gunman.

The massive buildings were the finest outside Adelaide, with the refreshment rooms being open for all passenger trains. At one time, passenger trains passing through Riverton had connections at Terowie to Broken Hill, Alice Springs and Perth. The refreshment rooms served a three-course dinner to east–west passengers and breakfast to Broken Hill passengers.

The station building now houses tea-rooms, a gallery and bed and breakfast accommodation. Renovated, ensuite railway carriages provide unusual accommodation.

The railways played a major part in the development of Riverton, both as a transport provider and as an employer. Today, the route of railway line from Riverton to Auburn has been converted into a walking/cycle rail trail, known as the Rattler Trail. The Rattler Trail joins the Riesling Trail at Auburn, providing a 43 km route from Riverton, through the heart of the Clare Valley wine region to the North. The Peterborough railway line is also closed, although no rail trail has been created.

== Media ==
Riverton was home to the Mid-North Courier, a newspaper printed between 5 January 1928 and 24 June 1942. It was available in Riverton, Saddleworth, Tarlee, Manoora, Marrabel and Rhynie.

It was also home to a newspaper called the Gilbert Valley News (1 July 1965 – 27 July 1967). The distribution of the publication included: Riverton, Saddleworth, Manoora, Tarlee, Marrabel, Rhynie, Waterloo, Stockport and Black Springs. In August 1967, the newspaper merged with Hamley Bridge's Junction News and Owen Post (10 May 1946 – 28 July 1967) to form the Junction and Gilbert Valley News (4 August 1967 – 30 January 1969). This combined newspaper was then merged into The Bunyip, located in Gawler.

== Governance ==
Riverton is in the District Council of Clare and Gilbert Valleys local government area, the state electoral district of Frome and the federal Division of Grey.

Liberal politicians Clive Hannaford and Trish Worth were born in Riverton.

== See also ==
- List of cities and towns in South Australia
