= Riesling Trail =

Walking and cycling track in South Australia

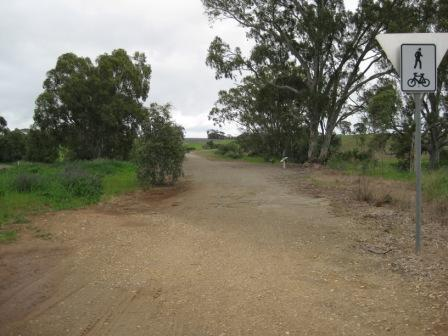
- Riesling Trail, looking to the north, near Leasingham
- Length: 35 kilometres (22 miles)
- Location: Clare Valley
- Established: 1995
- Trailheads: Auburn 34.02614°S 138.68555°E; Clare 33.83526°S 138.61843°E; Barinia 33.77113°S 138.62481°E
- Use: Walking, cycling
- Right of way: Spalding railway line
- Website: rieslingtrail.com.au

The Riesling Trail is a 35 kilometres (22 miles) long walking and cycling track located in the Clare Valley, South Australia. Established for recreational purposes, it runs between Auburn and Clare, passing through several towns and villages along the way, including Leasingham, Watervale, Penwortham and Sevenhill. The trail is named after Riesling, the most important white grape variety in the Clare Valley wine region. It continues 8 kilometres (5.0 miles) north of Clare to the area known as Barinia.

The Riesling Trail route is part of the former Spalding railway line branch line which ran between Riverton in the south to a northern terminus at Spalding. The section of railway from Riverton to Clare was opened in 1918. Railway stations and sidings along the line were: Rhynie, Undalya, Auburn, Mulkirri (siding), Watervale, Penwortham, Tatkana (siding), Sevenhill, Clare, Kooramo, Barinia, Hilltown, Andrews, and Spalding.

Rail services ceased after the 1983 Ash Wednesday bushfires burnt through the valley and damaged a lot of the trackwork. In 1989 the rails and steel bridges were removed and in 1993, this part of the route was converted into its present use as a walking and cycle trail.

The Riesling Trail passes through vineyard and farming country. There are various side loops as well as access to wineries, coffee shops, and pubs. Bike hire is available at several locations including Auburn, Clare and the Clare Caravan Park. It is possible to hire bikes and ride one-way with pick-up at the other end. The trail has a gentle up-grade from Auburn to just north of Penwortham, from where it gradually descends into Clare.

The Rattler Rail Trail extends a further 19 kilometres (12 miles) south of Auburn to Riverton, creating further opportunity for cycling and walking in the region.

== See also ==
- List of rail trails
- Wine tourism
- Spring Gully Conservation Park
