= Brady Creek =

Brady Creek may refer to:

- Brady Creek (San Saba River), a stream in Texas, United States
- Brady Creek (South Dakota), a stream in South Dakota, United States
- Brady Creek, South Australia, a locality in the Mid North region of South Australia, Australia
