= Riverton railway station =

Station in South Australia, 1870 to 1986

Riverton
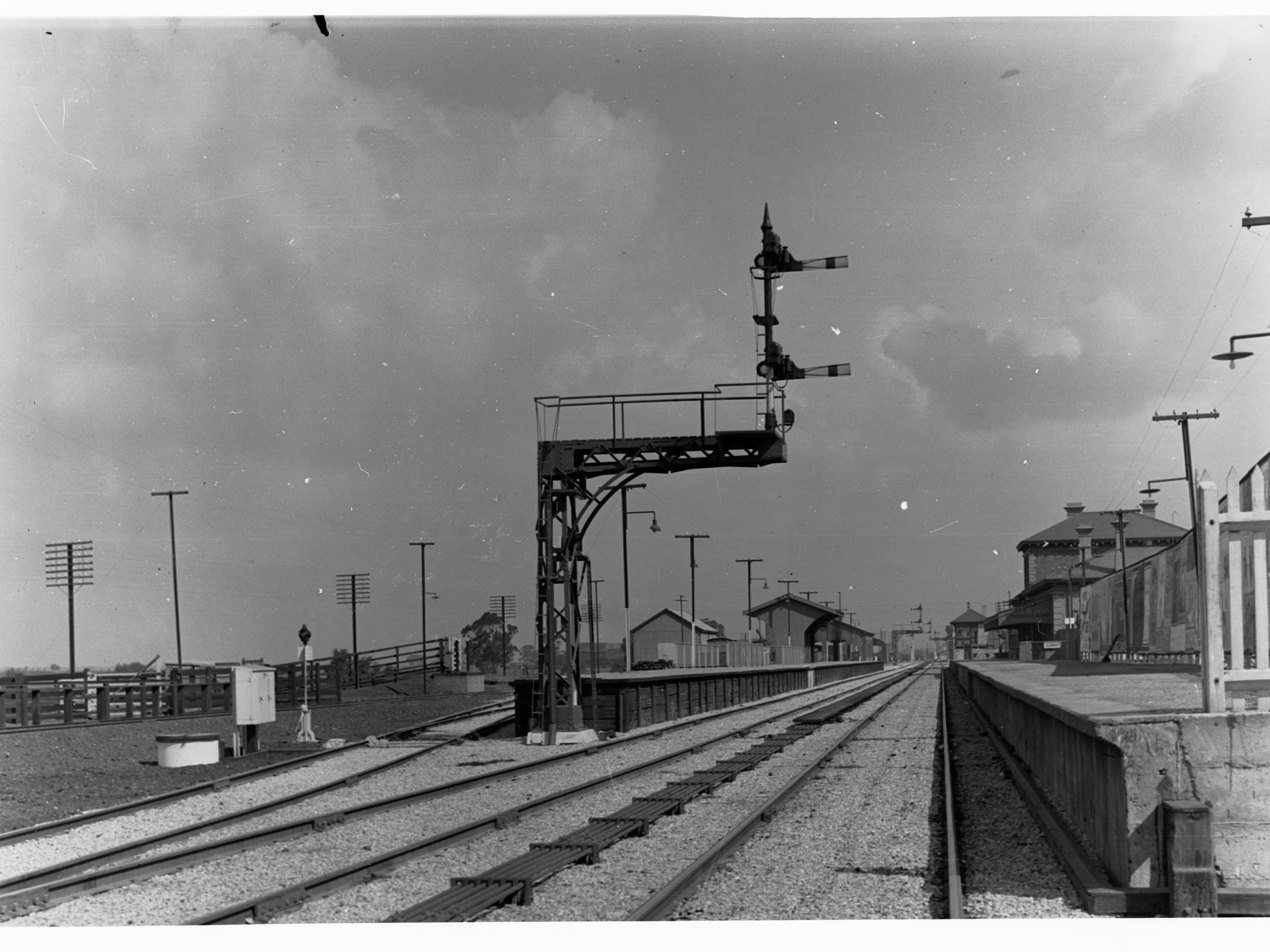
- Riverton railway station (circa 1929)

General information
- Location: Hannaford Avenue, Riverton, South Australia
- Coordinates: 34°09′31″S 138°44′58″E
- System: Former Australian National regional rail
- Owner: South Australian Railways 1860 - 1978 Australian National 1978 - 1997 One Rail Australia 1997-2022 Aurizon 2022-present
- Operator: South Australian Railways 1860 - 1978 Australian National 1978 - 1986
- Line: Roseworthy-Peterborough line
- Distance: 102 kilometres from Adelaide
- Platforms: 2
- Tracks: 2

Construction
- Structure type: Ground

Other information
- Status: Closed

History
- Opened: 21 February 1870
- Closed: December 1986

Services
| Preceding station | Aurizon | Following station |
|---|---|---|
| Tarlee towards Adelaide | Roseworthy-Peterborough railway line | Saddleworth towards Peterborough |
Location

Riverton railway station was located at the junction of the Roseworthy-Peterborough railway line and the Spalding railway line in South Australia.

== History ==
Riverton railway station opened on 21 February 1870 when the Roseworthy-Forresters railway line was extended to the towns of Manoora and Burra. It became a junction station on 5 July 1918 with the opening of the branch line to Clare (later extended to Spalding in 1922). Both lines were constructed as 1,600 mm (5 ft 3 in) broad gauge.

=== Shooting ===
A shooting occurred at the station on 22 March 1921, when Russian gunman Koorman Tomayoff departed the Broken Hill Express at Riverton and fired at several people, killing 2. It became the first political assassination in Australia as one of the deaths was New South Wales politician Percy Brookfield, who had attempted to subdue the gunman before being shot. Tomyaoff only expressed remorse for shooting Brookfield and no one else who was shot, but he later allegedly claimed that he was paid to kill Brookfield. Tomayoff was later declared insane and so he was never prosecuted, his motives for the shooting remaining unclear.

== Closure ==
Regular passenger services on the Spalding line was replaced by a co-ordinated bus service on 24 May 1954. In 1978, the station and all associated infrastructure was included in the transfer of South Australian Railways to Australian National. Riverton ceased to be a junction station with the closure of the Spalding line in 1984. Regular passenger services on the Peterborough line ceased in December 1986. Some special train tours used the station up until 2004. In 1997, the station and railway line were included in the transfer of Australian National's freight assets to Australian Southern Railroad (later known as One Rail Australia.) Bulk grain trains last used the line in October 2005.

== Present day ==
In 1981, the station was complex was found to have state heritage significance, and was subsequently placed on the SA State Heritage Register in 1987. The complex is now privately owned, and the station building is a private residence. During the 1990s some Redhen railcars were moved to the station complex and were used as accommodation. Most of the railcars have been scrapped, but a few have been retained as a wine tasting venue.
