= Auburn station =

Auburn station may refer to:

- Auburn station (California), in Auburn, California
- Auburn station (SEPTA), a former station in Auburn, Pennsylvania
- Auburn station (Sound Transit), in Auburn, Washington
- Auburn Park station, a planned railroad station in Chicago
- Auburn railway station, Melbourne, in Victoria, Australia
- Auburn railway station, Sydney, in New South Wales, Australia
- Auburn railway station, South Australia
