= Hilltown, South Australia =

Hilltown
- Town
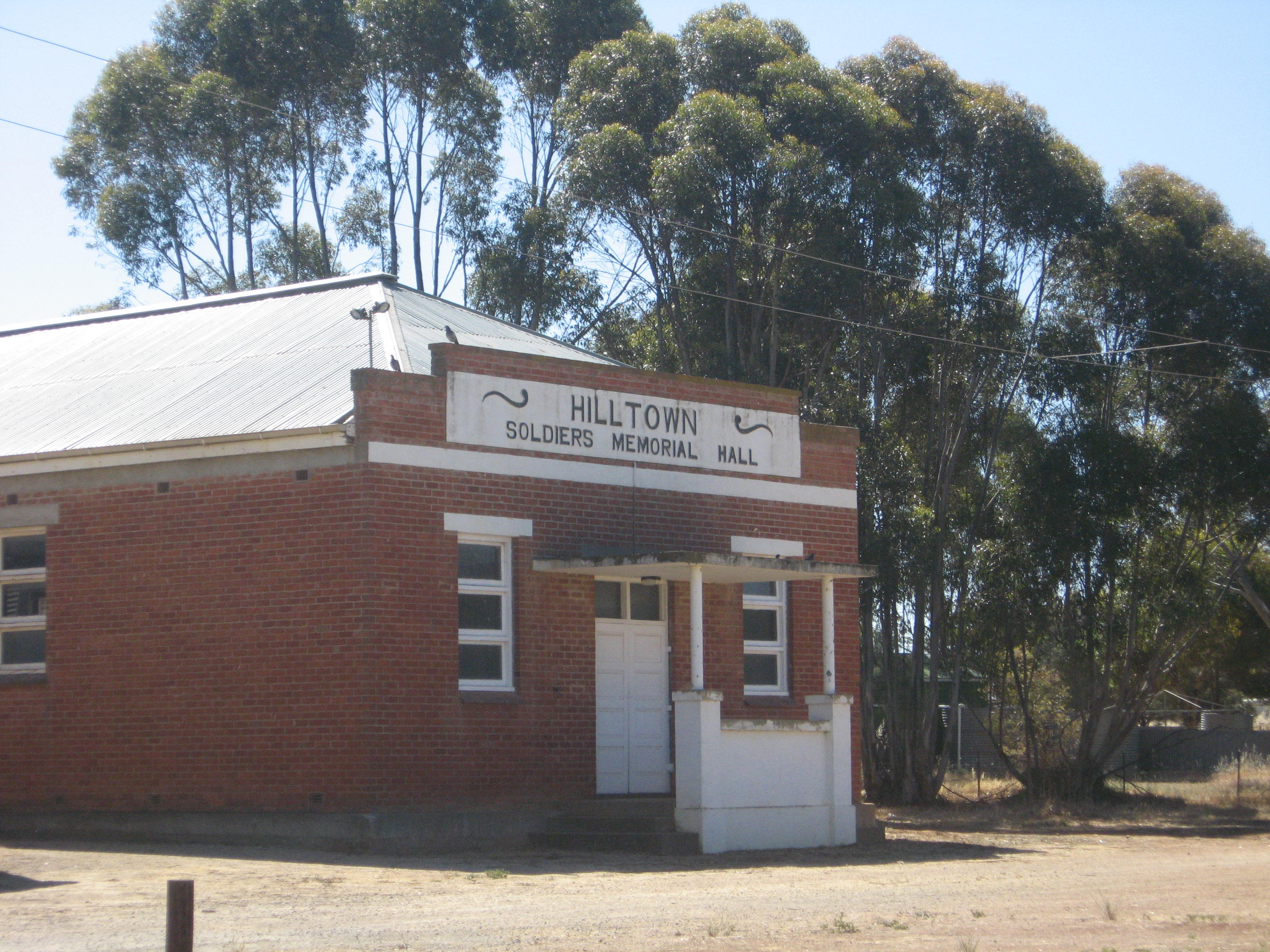
- Soldiers' Memorial Hall, Hilltown

- Coordinates: 33.6865°S 138.6364°E
- Country: Australia
- State: South Australia
- LGA: Clare and Gilbert Valley Council
- Established: 1866

Government
  - State electorate: Frome
  - Federal division: Grey
- Elevation: 348 m (1,142 ft)

Population
  - Total: 42 (SAL 2021)
- Postcode: 5455
Localities around Hilltown
Euromina	Andrews	Leighton
Anama	Hilltown	Gum Creek
Bungaree	Barinia	Hill River

Hilltown is a locality in the District Council of Clare and Gilbert Valleys of South Australia. The former town centre is located on Hilltown Road, which runs north-south between Andrews and Hill River, while the unsealed Harvey Highway connects the former town centre to RM Williams Way. It is about 4 km east of RM Williams Way, on the former Spalding railway line.

== History ==
It was created in the 1860s when closer settlement came to the Mid-North, allowing grain farming by self-employed farmers. The government town of Hilltown was surveyed in September 1865. The first lots at Hilltown were sold by public auction in March 1866. Street names of the surveyed township honored pioneering pastoralists of the region such as John Harris Browne and Charles Brown Fisher.

It was proposed to rename it Yakkalo in 1916 and Milne in 1926, but neither took effect. Subsequent public infrastructure, since closed, included a railway siding and primary school. The Riverton-Spalding railway line passed the town in 1922, the station was named for the Hundred of Milne which is the cadastral division in which the town was established. It was named in 1860 after Sir William Milne, MP. The town was recorded as diminished in 1929. The local railway station had been opened under the name of Milne, but was altered to Hilltown in 1939. The railway closed in 1984. Hilltown Post Office opened on 2 January 1914 and closed on 4 April 1985.

A private subdivision named Dudley formerly existed on the border of Hilltown and Barinia; it has now been subsumed into the two localities.

== Features ==
The Clare Valley Aerodrome is located in the south-west corner of the locality, on the corner of RM Williams Way and Cornwell Road. The Hilltown Soldiers' Memorial Hall is still available for community use.
