= Emu Downs =

Emu Downs may refer to:

- Emu Downs, South Australia
- Emu Downs Wind Farm, Western Australia
