= Booborowie =

- Town
- Coordinates: 33°33′46″S 138°45′45″E
- Country: Australia
- State: South Australia
- Region: Mid North
- LGA: Regional Council of Goyder
- Location: 200 km (120 mi) N of Adelaide
- Established: 1877

Government
  - State electorate: Stuart
  - Federal division: Division of Grey

Population
  - Total: 205 (SAL 2021)
- Time zone: UTC+9:30 (ACST)
  - Summer (DST): UTC+10:30 (ACDT)
- Postcode: 5417
Localities around Booborowie
Spalding	North Booborowie	Mount Bryan
Spalding	Booborowie	Mount Bryan
Andrews	Leighton	Burra

Booborowie is a locality in South Australia. It is located 200 km (124 mi) north of Adelaide.

== Booborowie Station ==
In 1843, Dr William James Browne and his brother Dr John Harris Browne took up the Booborowie run. In 1851 they purchased a crown lease of 153 square miles, and in 1853 the brothers purchased 46,978 acres of the lease.

The Browne brothers established a merino stud and ran shorthorn cattle. They went on to purchase properties on the Adelaide Plains, at Mount Gambier, the Flinders Ranges, and the Eyre Peninsula, and were instrumental in establishing Katherine in the Northern Territory. This led to a large sheep and cattle drive, under the supervision of Alfred Giles, to leave South Australia in 1878.

The northern portion of the station was sold to Henry Dutton and George Melrose in 1897. The remainder of the station was sold in 1910 and 1912 for closer settlement.

== History of the township ==
The Booborowie Township was proclaimed on 29 March 1877.

Being a farming community, the chief products produced are wool, wheat, lucerne and canola.

The town is named after the nearby Booborowie Waterhole, a small seasonal waterhole on Walton Palace Creek about 1 km (0.6 mi) north west of the town, the "owie" signifying "waterhole" in the language of the indigenous Ngadjuri people, as in Hundred of Minlacowie, Terowie and Yarcowie (modern linguists tend to render the word as 'awi'). The spelling "Booboorowie" was common in the 19th century.

A feature of the area is the "Camel Hump", a drystone wall which runs over 30 kilometres (19 miles) from Booborowie to Farrell Flat.

The historic Booborowie Homestead and the former Booborowie Council Chambers are listed on the South Australian Heritage Register.

Today, Booborowie is a popular destination for visitors enjoying the rural scenery, historic buildings and camping facilities at the town oval. The town is serviced by a primary school (opened 1892) with playgroup. There was once a general store in the centre of town that housed both a hardware store and the post office. The building is now a diner, and the post office has moved to the town hall.
