= Pultenaea maidenii =

Maiden's bush-pea

Conservation status
- Extinct (EPBC Act)

Scientific classification
- Kingdom: Plantae
- Clade: Embryophytes
- Clade: Tracheophytes
- Clade: Spermatophytes
- Clade: Angiosperms
- Clade: Eudicots
- Clade: Rosids
- Order: Fabales
- Family: Fabaceae
- Subfamily: Faboideae
- Genus: Pultenaea
- Species: †P. maidenii

Binomial name
- †Pultenaea maidenii Reader

Synonyms
- Pultenaea stricta var. maideni Ewart orth. var.; Pultenaea stricta var. maidenii (Reader) Ewart

Species of flowering plant

Pultenaea maidenii, commonly known as Maiden's bush-pea, is an extinct species of flowering plant in the family Fabaceae and was endemic to Victoria, Australia. It was an erect shrub with egg-shaped leaves with the narrower end towards the base, and pea-shaped flowers.

== Description ==
Pultenaea maidenii was an erect shrub that typically grew to a height of up to 1 m (3 ft 3 in), with ribbed stems that were sparsely hairy when young. The leaves were egg-shaped with the narrower end towards the base, concave or folded lengthwise, 6–10 mm (0.24–0.39 in) long and 2–3 mm (0.079–0.118 in) wide with lance-shaped stipules about 1.5 mm (0.059 in) long at the base. The flowers were arranged clusters of four to six at the ends of the branches with broadly egg-shaped to round bracts 1–3 mm (0.039–0.118 in) long and wide. The sepals were 5–6 mm (0.20–0.24 in) long with bracteoles attached to the side of the sepal tube. The standard was 7–8 mm (0.28–0.31 in) long and the ovary was hairy. Flowering occurred in November.

== Taxonomy and naming ==
Pultenaea maidenii was first formally described in 1906 by Felix Reader in The Victorian Naturalist from specimens collected in 1904 by Herbert Bennett Williamson "at the Pipehead Reservoir of the Hamilton Waterworks, on the Victoria Range, Dundas County, Victoria". The specific epithet (maidenii) honours Joseph Maiden.

== Distribution ==
Maiden's bush-pea grows is only known from the collections made by Williamson between 1903 and 1906 on the south-western side of the Victoria Range in the Grampians.

== Conservation status ==
Pultenaea maidenii is listed as "extinct" under the Australian Government Environment Protection and Biodiversity Conservation Act 1999.
