= Tarlee railway station =

Former railway station in South Australia, Australia

Tarlee

General information
- Coordinates: 34.27611675747103°S 138.76953124660258°E
- Elevation: 373 m (1,224 ft)
- System: Former Australian National regional rail
- Operator: Australian National
- Line: Roseworthy-Peterborough line
- Distance: 87.9 kilometres from Adelaide
- Platforms: 1
- Tracks: 1

Construction
- Structure type: Ground

Other information
- Status: Closed

History
- Opened: 1898
- Closed: December 1986

Services
| Preceding station | Aurizon | Following station |
|---|---|---|
| Stockport towards Adelaide | Roseworthy-Peterborough railway line | Riverton towards Peterborough |
Location

Tarlee railway station was located on the Roseworthy-Peterborough railway line. It served the town of Tarlee, South Australia.

== History ==
=== Opening ===
The first stage of the broad gauge Burra line from a junction at Roseworthy to Forresters (now Tarlee) opened on 3 July 1869. It extended to Manoora on 21 February 1870, Burra on 29 August 1870, Hallett on 10 March 1878 and Terowie on 14 December 1880. Terowie was a break of gauge station with the line continuing north to Peterborough as a narrow gauge line, opening on 11 May 1881. The current Tarlee railway station was built in 1898 and replaced the original terminus of Forresters. It was named after a corruption of the name of the already established city of "Tralee" in County Kerry, Ireland. The station consisted of a main building, a goods shed, goods platform with loading crane, station master's residence, wheat shed, stockyards, stacking blocks and various iron and bluestone flour sheds, motor sheds and a passing loop measuring 200m long.

=== Closure ===
In 1978, the station and all associated infrastructure was included in the transfer of South Australian Railways to Australian National. The station closed for regular passenger use on 13 December 1986, but some special tours used the station up until 2004. In 1997, the station and railway line were included in the transfer of Australian National's South Australian freight assets to Australian Southern Railroad (later known as One Rail Australia.) Grain trains last used the silos at Tarlee in October 2005. The station remnants and railway line were included in Aurizon's purchase of One Rail Australia in 2022.

=== Present day ===
Most of the station and infrastructure still remain today but are in disrepair. The wheat shed, stockyards and stacking blocks have been demolished. The station is now privately owned.
