= Koonoona, South Australia =

Koonoona
- Town
- Coordinates: 33°49′50″S 138°55′44″E
- Country: Australia
- State: South Australia
- LGA: Regional Council of Goyder
- Established: August 2000 (gazetted)

Government
  - State electorate: Stuart
  - Federal division: Grey

Population
  - Total: 7 (SAL 2021)
- Postcode: 5417
Localities around Koonoona
Porter Lagoon	Burra	Burra
Porter Lagoon	Koonoona	Burra
Black Springs	Apoinga	Emu Downs

Koonoona is a rural locality in the Mid North region of South Australia, situated in the Regional Council of Goyder. It was established in August 2000, when boundaries were formalised for the "long established local name". It occupies the north-western corner of the cadastral Hundred of Apoinga.

The area was originally the territory of the Ngadjuri people. It was named after the Koonoona Station and Merino stud, which was established in 1863 by Walter Duffield and T. S. Porter. Koonoona Station was described in 1929 as "one of the oldest estates in this district" and "noted for the breed of its merino sheep"; another correspondent in 1933 labelled it "one of the most important [Merino studs] in the Commonwealth".

Koonoona Provisional School opened in 1894, was declared half-time with Gum Creek in 1903, and closed in 1915.
