= Apoinga, South Australia =

Apoinga South Australia
- Coordinates: 33.93°S 138.94°E
- Population: 29 (SAL 2021)
- Postcode(s): 5413
- Location: 27 km (17 mi) S of Burra
- LGA(s): Regional Council of Goyder
- State electorate(s): Stuart
- Federal division(s): Grey
Localities around Apoinga:
Porter Lagoon	Koonoona	Emu Downs
Black Springs	Apoinga	Emu Downs
Waterloo	Tothill Belt	Brady Creek
- Footnotes: Coordinates

Apoinga is a rural locality in the Mid North region of South Australia, situated in the Regional Council of Goyder.

The area was originally the territory of the Ngadjuri people. The cadastral Hundred of Apoinga was proclaimed on 7 August 1851 by Governor Henry Young. It is believed to be a corruption of "appinga", a name of a local Aboriginal tribe. The hundred had its own local government, the District Council of Apoinga, from 1873 to 1932; however, the council seat was at Logan Gap. The Apoinga Lutheran Church opened on 10 July 1936 in the former Apoinga School, but the congregation relocated to the Black Springs Church (a former Anglican church) in 1963.

The modern locality was established in August 2000, when boundaries were formalised for the "long established local name". A portion of Apoinga was severed and added to Emu Downs on 20 August 2015 to resolve an access problem. The locality is much smaller than the cadastral hundred, consisting of a north–south strip along part of the hundred's western border.

The historic former Apoinga Hotel and the Apoinga Smelter Site (the former Penny's Smelting Works) on Tothill Belt Road are listed on the South Australian Heritage Register. The smelter was established at Apoinga in 1848 by Messrs Penny and Owen. Until then, ore from the copper mines at Burra was transported to Port Adelaide and shipped to Swansea in Wales for smelting. Establishing smelters in Australia could reduce the cost of producing copper ingots. There was no supply of coal known in South Australia to fuel a smelter. Penny believed he had a process of smelting ore using a smelter fueled by charcoal made from the abundant timber supplies in the area. Apoinga was on the road from Burra to Adelaide. The smelter produced its first copper in January 1849, but had closed by 1852 as the miners moved to the Victorian gold rush.
