= Hopkins Creek Conservation Park =

Protected area in South Australia

- IUCN category VI (protected area with sustainable use of natural resources)
- Location within South Australia
- Location: South Australia, Emu Downs
- Nearest city: Burra
- Coordinates: 33°51′07″S 139°00′59″E
- Area: 5.15 km^{2} (1.99 sq mi)
- Established: 22 July 2010
- Governing body: Department for Environment and Water

Hopkins Creek Conservation Park is a protected area located in the Australian state of South Australia in the locality of Emu Downs about 125 kilometres (78 mi) north-east of the state capital of Adelaide and about 21 kilometres (13 mi) south of the town of Burra.

The conservation park consists of Section B, Block C4 and Section 467 in the cadastral unit of the Hundred of Apoinga. It is named after Hopkins Creek, a watercourse located to the north of its boundaries. It came into existence on 22 July 2010 by proclamation under the National Parks and Wildlife Act 1972. A separate proclamation on 22 July 2010 ensured the continuation of “existing rights of entry, prospecting, exploration or mining” regarding the land under the Mining Act 1971. As of 2016, it covered an area of 5.15 square kilometres (1.99 sq mi).

The Heysen Trail, the long distance walking trail, passes along the southern boundary of the conservation park.

Land within the conservation park's boundaries is known to be a site for Acacia glandulicarpa (hairy-pod wattle), a perennial shrub which occurs in western Victoria and eastern South Australia and which is listed as endangered by the National Parks and Wildlife Act 1972 and as vulnerable by the Commonwealth Environment Protection and Biodiversity Conservation Act 1999.

The conservation park is classified as an IUCN Category VI protected area.

== See also ==
- Protected areas of South Australia
