= Euromina =

- Town
- Coordinates: 33.61°S 138.59°E
- Country: Australia
- State: South Australia
- LGA: Northern Areas Council
- Location: 25 km (16 mi) north of Clare; 15 km (9.3 mi) south of Spalding
- Established: 1865

Government
  - State electorate: Stuart
  - Federal division: Grey
- Postcode: 5454
Localities around Euromina
Yacka	Broughton River Valley
	Euromina	Andrews
Marola	Anama	Hilltown

Euromina is a locality in the upper Mid North of South Australia. It is about 25 kilometres (16 mi) north of Clare and spans RM Williams Way. The area is sparsely populated, with its small population growing from 12 in 2016 to 25 in 2021.
