= Bonney Well =

Waterhole in Northern Territory, Australia

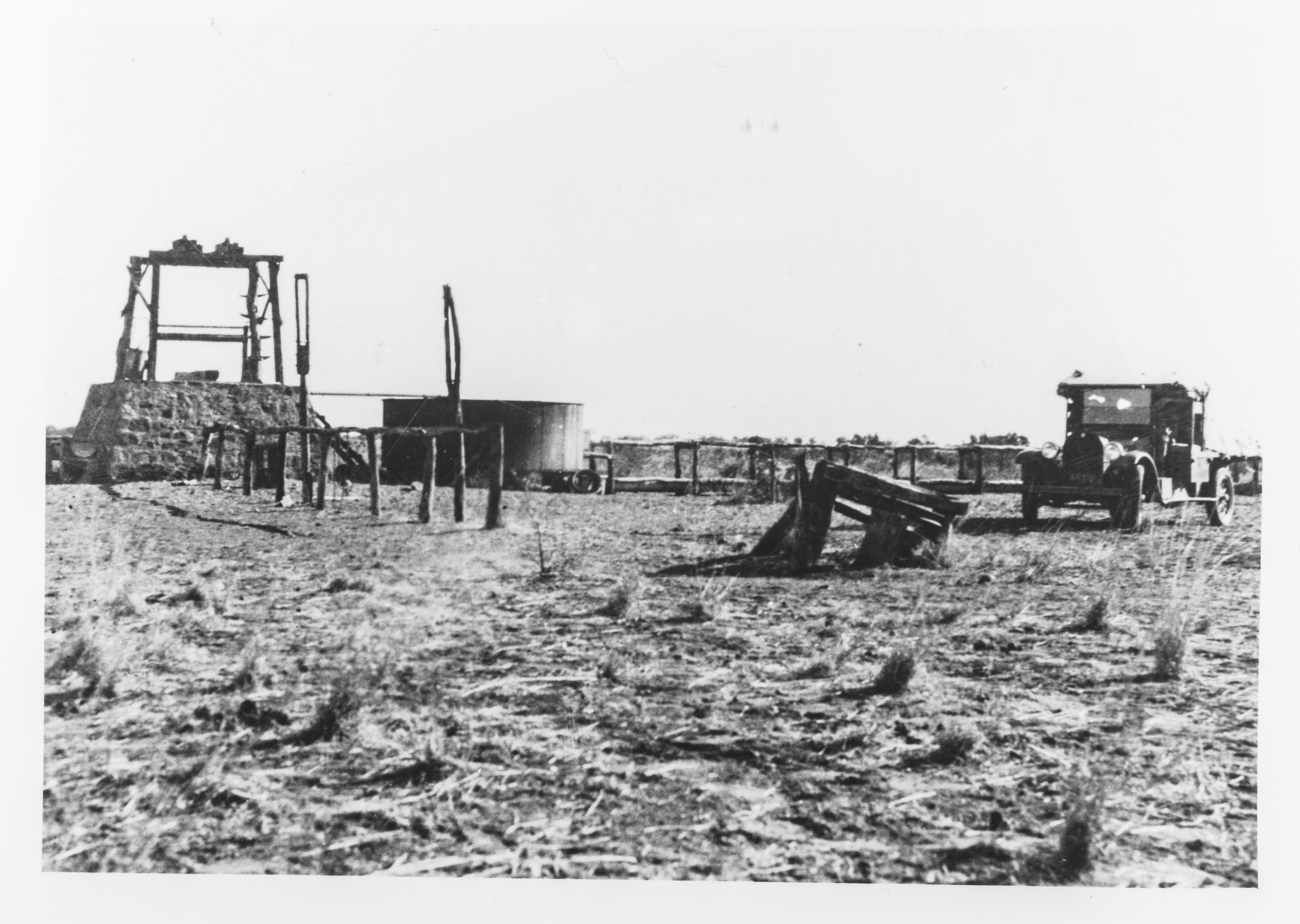
Bonney Well in 1925

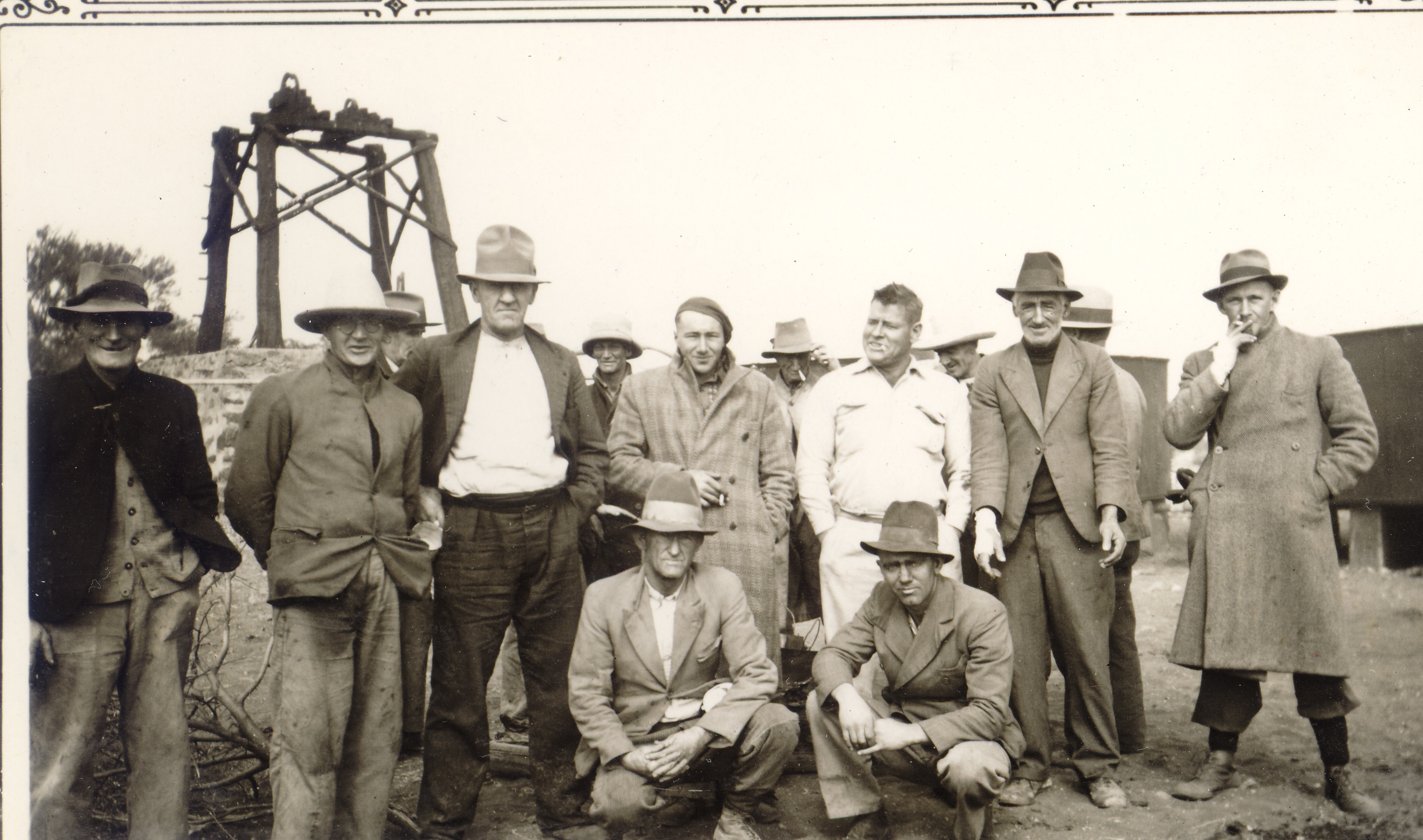
Road gangs at Bonney Well, c1938 - 1948

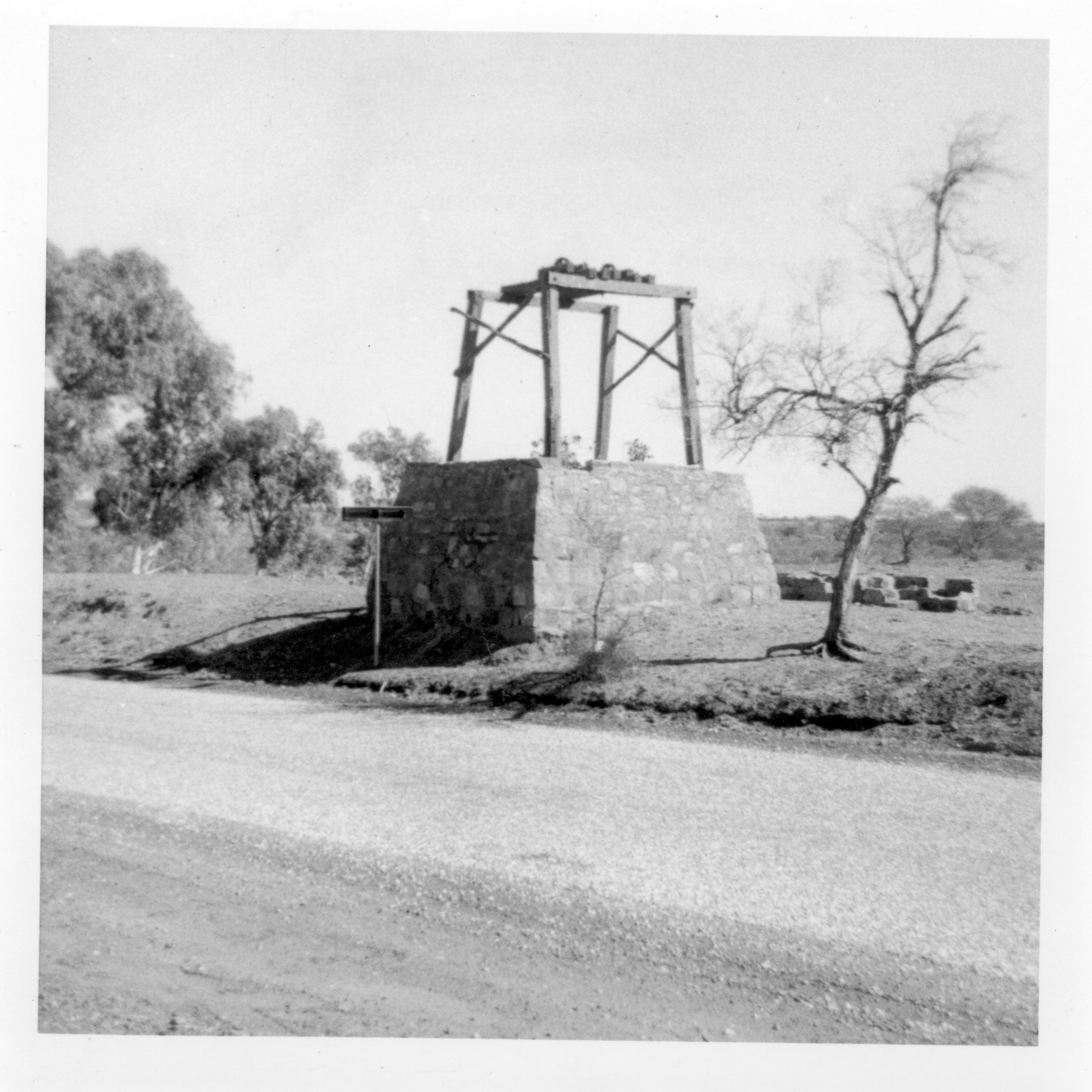
Bonney Well in c1964

Bonney Well, sometimes referred to as Bonny Well is a former stock well on the North South Stock Route. It is 90 km south of Tennant Creek, 8 km north of Karlu Karlu and is on the Lands of the Warumungu people.

Bonney Well is one of only three wells remaining with its stone dumps intact. It is a popular tourist stop for people travelling through the Barkly Region along the Stuart Highway and it offers a carpark, picnic area and public toilet. It was listed on the Northern Territory Heritage Register on 22 August 1996.

== History ==
The waterhole that became Bonney Well was first used by John McDouall Stuart in 1860 - 1962 during his expeditions across Australia. He named it after Charles Bonney, the Commissioner of Crown Lands of South Australia back then.

The well was first dug in 1878 - 1897 by Arthur and Alfred Giles when they were overlanding 12,000 sheep to Springvale Station. It was then deepened by staff of the Australian Overland Telegraph Line in 1884 and a stone dump and whip system were added in 1892. The well's whip no longer remains.

The bore, windmill and tank were installed in the late 1930s and, some time later, a cement tank. These have been protected and they provide an example of the areas industrial heritage. In the 1930s there was interest in Bonney Well from a variety of mining companies but no major mining activity took place there. In 1936 the death of a prospector, Charles Simmons, who collapsed in the intense heat on the road to Bonney Well was reported nationally.

In the early 1930s missionary Annie Lock set up a mission at the nearby Yirrarji Rockhole (Boxer Creek), 35 km north of Bonney Well. During this period she was known as "The good missus of Bonny Well."
