= Annie Lock =

Australian missionary (1876–1943)

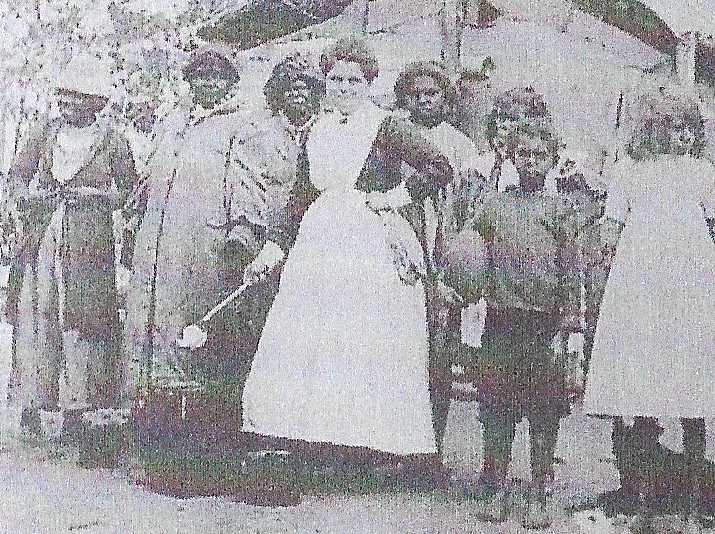
Annie Lock in 1915 at the Carrolup Mission

Ann Lock, better known as Annie Lock (1 August 1876 – 10 February 1943), was a missionary of the Australian Aborigines Mission, (later United Aborigines Mission). She worked across Australia for nearly 35 years and played an important role in bringing the Coniston Massacre to national public attention.

== Early life ==
Annie Lock was born on 1 August 1876 at Rhynie in South Australia. Annie was the seventh child of English-born parents, Ann and Walter Lock. She worked as a dressmaker until 1901 when she entered Angas College, Adelaide to train as a missionary.

In 1903 she joined the New South Wales Aborigines Mission (which became the Australian Aborigines Mission and then the United Aborigines Mission in 1929). She spend 34 years working for the mission society.

== Work ==
Lock worked as a missionary in NSW, WA, SA and the NT. Her most controversial period was when, in 1927, she arrived at Mer Ilpereny (Harding Soak/Arden's Soak), 161 km north of Alice Springs and approximately 22 km from Coniston Station where she established a 'mission'. While there she worked primarily with the approximately 100 Anmatyerr people who lived or visited the soak.

The Australian Aborigines Mission did not support her move here. It was too far north for logistical support and they had plans to send two male missionaries to the area. For this reason she was entirely dependent on direct donations to offer shelter, food, medical treatment and education to the people living there.

When the Coniston Massacre took place Lock was as instrumental in bringing about an official inquiry into what happened there. Following her advocacy, along with that of Methodist Home Missionary Athol McGregor, a Board of Inquiry was appointed in December 1928. It was presided over by police magistrate, A H O'Kelly.

The mission at Mer Ilpereny closed in 1928 when, due to severe drought the water supply dried up and the site was abandoned. Lock remained in Central Australia for some years after this and undertook 'roving mission work' in which she travelled to surrounding cattle stations and, eventually set up another mission at Yirrarji Rockhole (Boxer Creek), 35 km north of Bonney Well in the Barkly Region where she established a school.

In 1929, Lock gave evidence at the Inquiry and achieved national notoriety when Hermann Adolph Heinrich, a missionary from Ntaria (Hermannsburg), declared that she had told him she would be "happy to marry a black". This 'sensational' quote was reported around Australia and drew significant negative attention to her. One of the findings of the inquiry was to partially blamed racial unrest in the area on "a woman Missionary living amongst naked blacks thus lowering their respect for the whites".

== Later life ==
In 1933 Lock returned to South Australia where she worked at Ooldea, where she pioneered a mission until 1936.

She married widower James Johansen in Port Augusta on 15 September 1937 and resigned from the mission organisation and travelled with her minister husband; despite suffering from diabetes.

Lock died of pneumonia on 10 February 1943 at Cleve on the Eyre Peninsula.

== Resources about ==
Bishop, Catherine & Curtin, Penelope, (editor.) (2021). Too much cabbage and Jesus Christ : Australia's 'mission girl' Annie Lock (1st ed). Wakefield Press, Mile End, South Australia.
