= Clare Valley Aerodrome =

Airport in South Australia

- IATA: none; ICAO: YCVA

Summary
- Airport type: Private
- Operator: Clare Valley Flying Group
- Location: Hilltown, South Australia
- Elevation AMSL: 1,120 ft (340 m)
- Coordinates: 33°42′32″S 138°35′06″E
- Website: www.clarevalleyaerodrome.com.au

Map
- Location in South Australia

Runways
Direction	Length		Surface
Direction	m	ft	Surface
17/35	1,200	3,937	Clay
09/27	600	1,969	Grass
- Sources: AIP,

Clare Valley Aerodrome is an airport located 14 km (8.7 mi) north of the town of Clare, South Australia. The Clare Valley Flying Group began construction of the airfield in 2010 and it was officially opened in November 2014.
