= Leighton, South Australia =

Leighton
- Town
- Coordinates: 33.66°S 138.80°E
- Country: Australia
- State: South Australia
- LGA: Regional Council of Goyder

Government
  - State electorate: Stuart
  - Federal division: Grey

Population
  - Total: 46 (SAL 2021)
- Postcode: 5417
Localities around Leighton
Booborowie	Booborowie	Burra
Andrews	Leighton	Burra
Hilltown	Gum Creek	Burra

Leighton (originally Baldry) is a rural locality in the Mid North region of South Australia, situated in the Regional Council of Goyder. It was established in August 2000, when boundaries were formalised for the "long established local name".

The settlement began as a private subdivision known as Baldry, which was first put up for auction in January 1875. It subsequently adopted the name of Leighton, which was the name of a family of early settlers in the area.

Leighton Post Office opened as Baldry Post Office in 1877 but was soon renamed; it closed in 1920. The Baldry (later Leighton) Wesleyan Church opened in the 1870s; its date of closure is unknown. The Leighton Hall opened in 1909 and was demolished in 2003.

Leighton School opened in 1880 and closed in 1989. The former school's World War I honour roll is now preserved at the Booborowie Institute.

Leighton Cricket Club was formed in 1929; its date of closure is unknown. Leighton Golf Club opened in 1932, but there is no reference to it after 1941. Leighton was also an early council seat for the District Council of Booborowie, prior to the construction of a council chambers at Booborowie itself.

The locality is zoned for use in primary production, mainly for agricultural uses, with a small amount of land used for grazing livestock.
