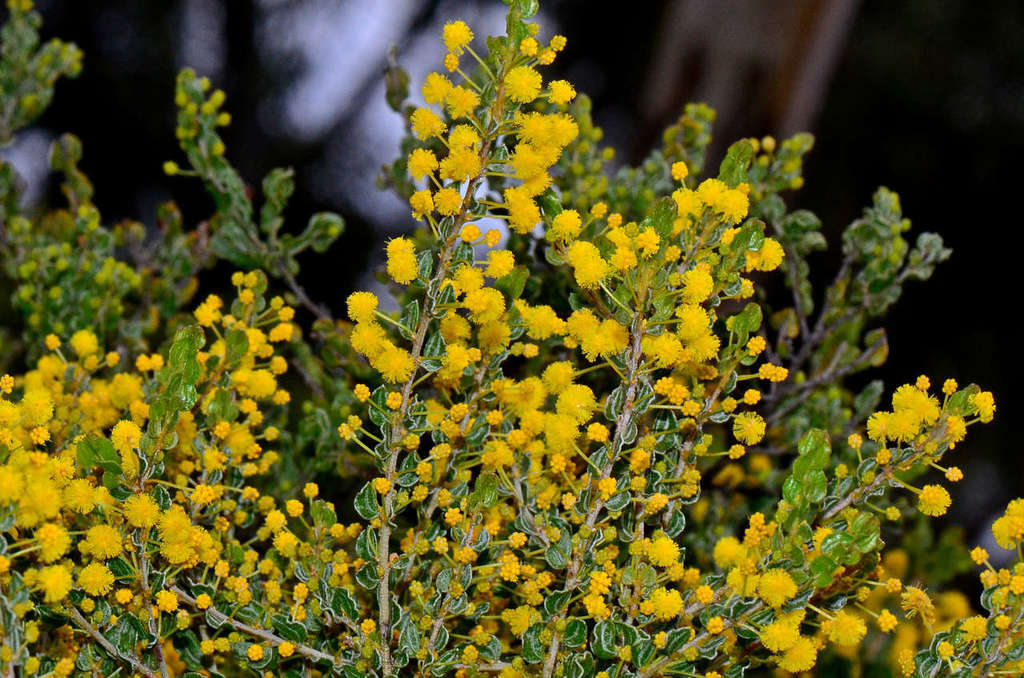

Conservation status
- Vulnerable (EPBC Act)

Scientific classification
- Kingdom: Plantae
- Clade: Tracheophytes
- Clade: Angiosperms
- Clade: Eudicots
- Clade: Rosids
- Order: Fabales
- Family: Fabaceae
- Subfamily: Caesalpinioideae
- Clade: Mimosoid clade
- Genus: Acacia
- Species: A. glandulicarpa

Binomial name
- Acacia glandulicarpa Reader
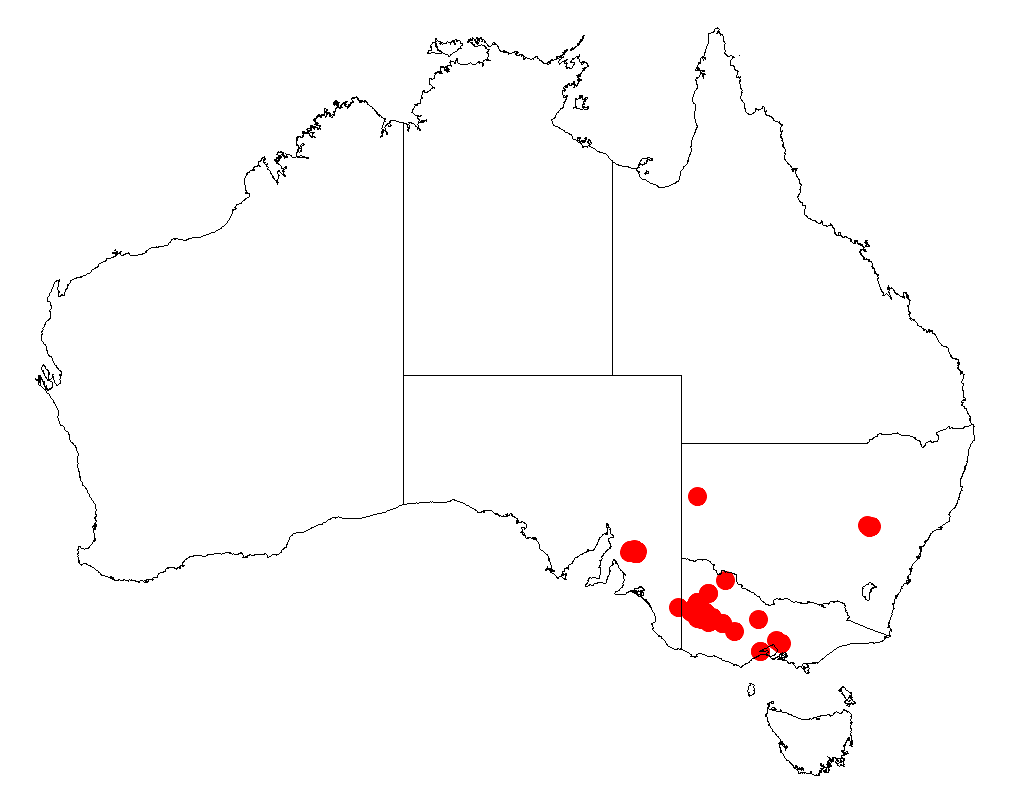
- Occurrence data from AVH

Synonyms
- Racosperma glandulicarpum (Reader) Pedley

= Acacia glandulicarpa =

Hairy pod wattle

Species of legume

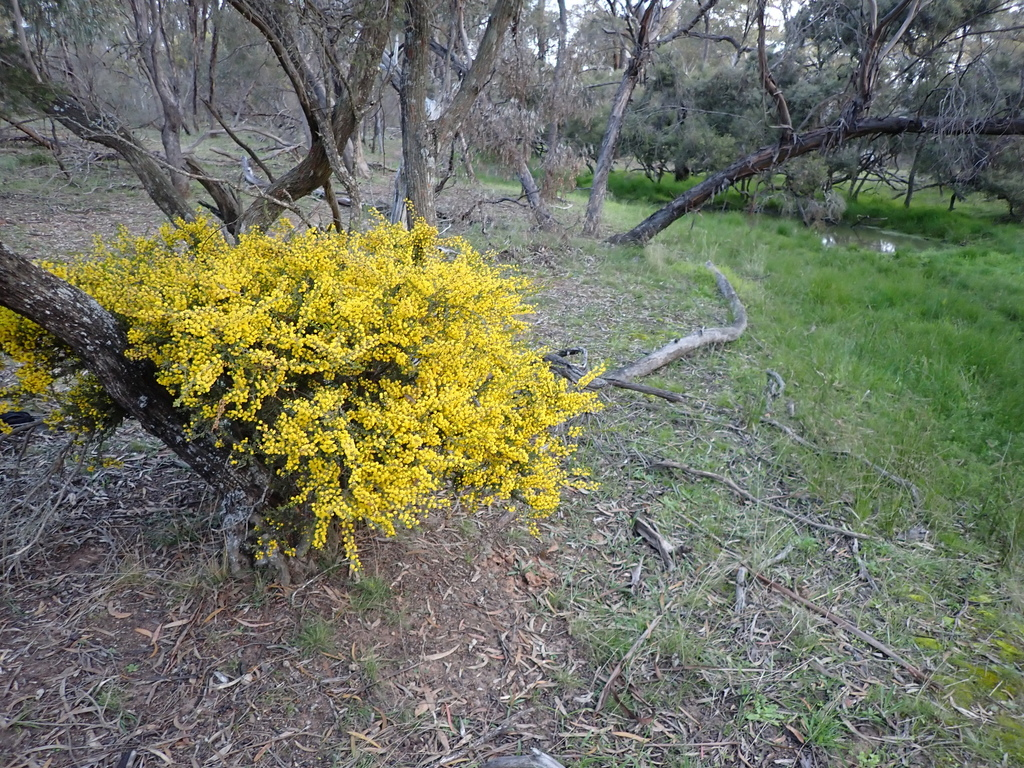
Habit near Horsham

Acacia glandulicarpa, commonly known as hairy-pod wattle, is a species of flowering plant in the family Fabaceae and is endemic to southern continental Australia. It is a dense, spreading, slightly sticky shrub with hairy branchlets, egg-shaped to elliptic phyllodes, spherical heads of bright yellow flowers and oblong, thinly leathery pods.

== Description ==
Acacia glandulicarpa is a dense, spreading, slightly sticky shrub that typically grows to a height of 1–2 m (3 ft 3 in – 6 ft 7 in) and has hairy branchlets. Its phyllodes are egg-shaped, 5–13 mm (0.20–0.51 in) long and 3–6 mm (0.12–0.24 in) wide, the upper edge more or less straight and parallel to the branchlet, the lower edge convex and usually wavy. Each face of the phyllodes have one or two prominent veins. The flowers are borne in one or two spherical heads in axils on a slender, glabrous peduncle 4–10 mm (0.16–0.39 in), each of the many heads with eight to twenty bright yellow flowers. Flowering occurs from July to October, and the pods are narrowly oblong, up to 30 mm (1.2 in) long, about 5 mm (0.20 in) wide, thinly leathery and densely covered with glandular hairs. The seeds are oblong, about 3 mm (0.12 in) long with a curved aril.

== Taxonomy ==
Acacia glandulicarpa was first formally described by Felix Reader in The Victorian Naturalist from specimens he collected in "hilly mallee country, north-west from Dimboola" in 1895. The specific epithet (glandulicarpa) means 'small-gland fruit', referring to the pods that are covered with glandular hairs.

== Distribution and habitat ==
Hairy-pod wattle has a scattered distribution, occurring in Burra Creek Gorge, Hanson and Bordertown areas in South Australia and the Little Desert-Dimboola area in Victoria. The species grows in alkaline soil on rocky hills, in open scub or open forest. The population in Victoria is scattered in about 100 woodland sites, located in southern Wimmera, south-west of Horsham and north of Nhill to near Burra Creek Gorge area and Bordertown area in South Australia, through to the Little Desert and Dimboola in Victoria where it is found on rocky hills as a part of scrub or Eucalyptus woodland communities.

In locations where soils are not as well drained, the species is associated with yellow gum (Eucalyptus leucoxylon), grey box (Eucalyptus microcarpa) and buloke (Allocasuarina luehmannii).

Most sites are in vulnerable situations such as roadsides, small crown land remnants or scattered within developed agricultural land, distributed on slopes in the transition zone between heavy and sandy soils.

== Conservation status ==
Acacia glandulicarpa is listed as "vulnerable" under the Australian Government Environment Protection and Biodiversity Conservation Act 1999 and as "endangered" under the Victorian Government Flora and Fauna Guarantee Act 1988 and the South Australian Government Protected areas of South Australia#National Parks and Wildlife Act 1972.

There are estimated to be about 6,000 – 12,000 plants among the roughly 100 sites, with the Little Desert National Park site accounting for about 25% of the total number. Most of the remaining sites are small, fragmented, and vulnerable to disturbance, within degraded and weedy vegetation, providing little opportunity to expand the population.

== Threats ==
Threats to the species include inappropriate fire regimes, weed invasion, lack of regeneration, erosion, agricultural chemical spray drift, roadworks, and grazing by introduced herbivores or domestic stock.

Ecological requirements for the hairy-pod wattle have not yet been studied and identified. While it is known that seedlings can grow without fire or soil disturbance, information on regeneration has not been studied.

== See also ==
- List of Acacia species
