= Farrell Flat =

Farrell Flat South Australia
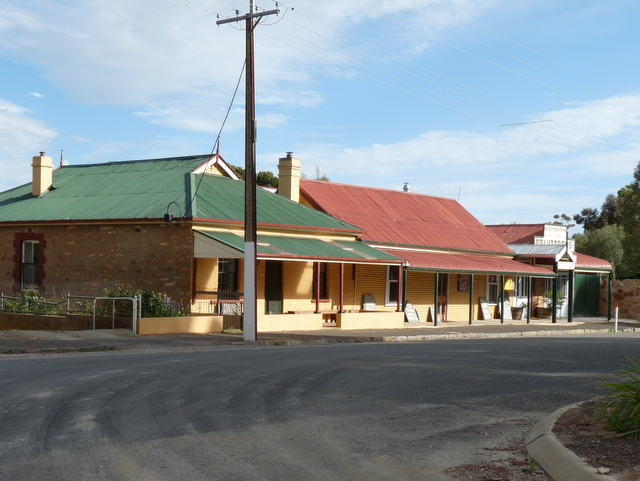
- Shops in Farrell Flat

- Coordinates: 33°50′0″S 138°48′0″E
- Population: 201 (SAL 2021)
- Postcode(s): 5416
- Location: 151 km (94 mi) N of Adelaide; 20 km (12 mi) E of Clare; 22 km (14 mi) SW of Burra
- LGA(s): Regional Council of Goyder
- State electorate(s): Frome, Stuart
- Federal division(s): Grey
- Website: Farrell Flat
Localities around Farrell Flat:
Hill River	Gum Creek	Hanson
Clare	Farrell Flat	Porter Lagoon
Mintaro	Manoora	Black Springs

Farrell Flat (formerly Hanson) is a town in South Australia. The town is located 20 kilometres (12 mi) east of Clare and 22 kilometres (14 mi) southwest of Burra.

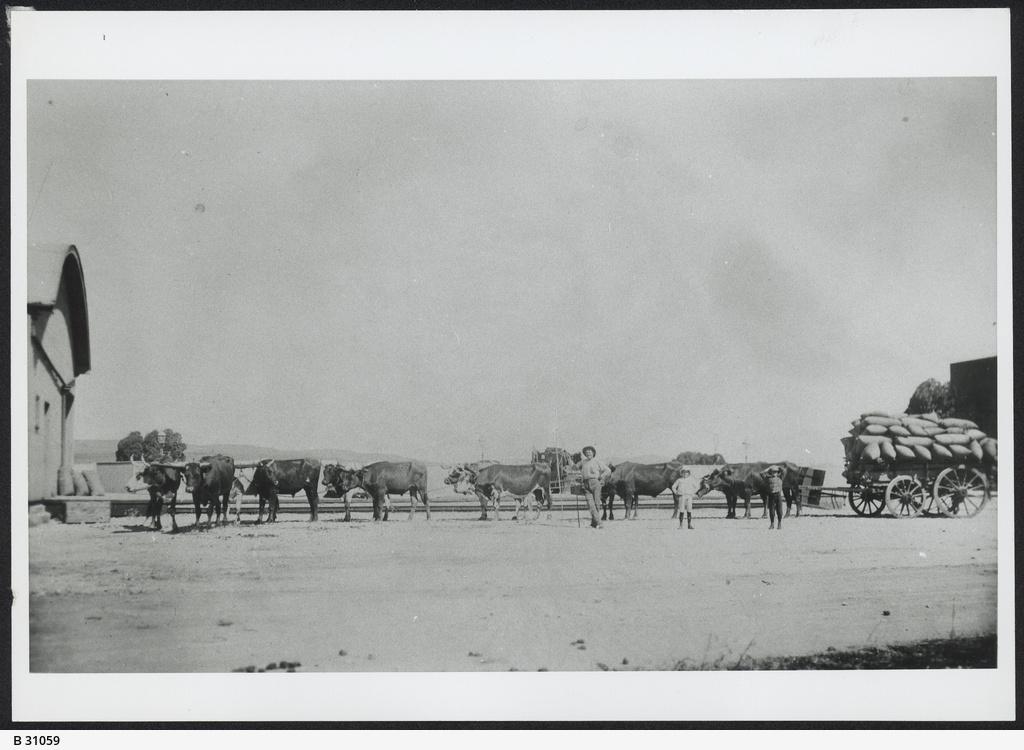
Farrell Flat 1912

Once the heart of a thriving farming community, Farrell Flat today is largely a satellite town to the larger towns nearby. It has retained its own identity, with a functioning hotel, cafe and meeting house, engineering business and grain silos.

The town was surveyed as Hanson in 1870 and did not officially become Farrell Flat until 19 September 1940. The name Farrell's Flat had been in use for some time, this being the name of the railway station. The nearby town of Davies was officially renamed to Hanson on 19 September 1940.

Farrell Flat was on the Roseworthy-Peterborough railway line. The last train ran through Farrell Flat in 2004.

Farrell Flat was named for Colonial Chaplain and Dean of Adelaide, James Farrell (26 November 1803 – 26 April 1869)

== See also ==
- Stanley Football Association

== Gallery ==
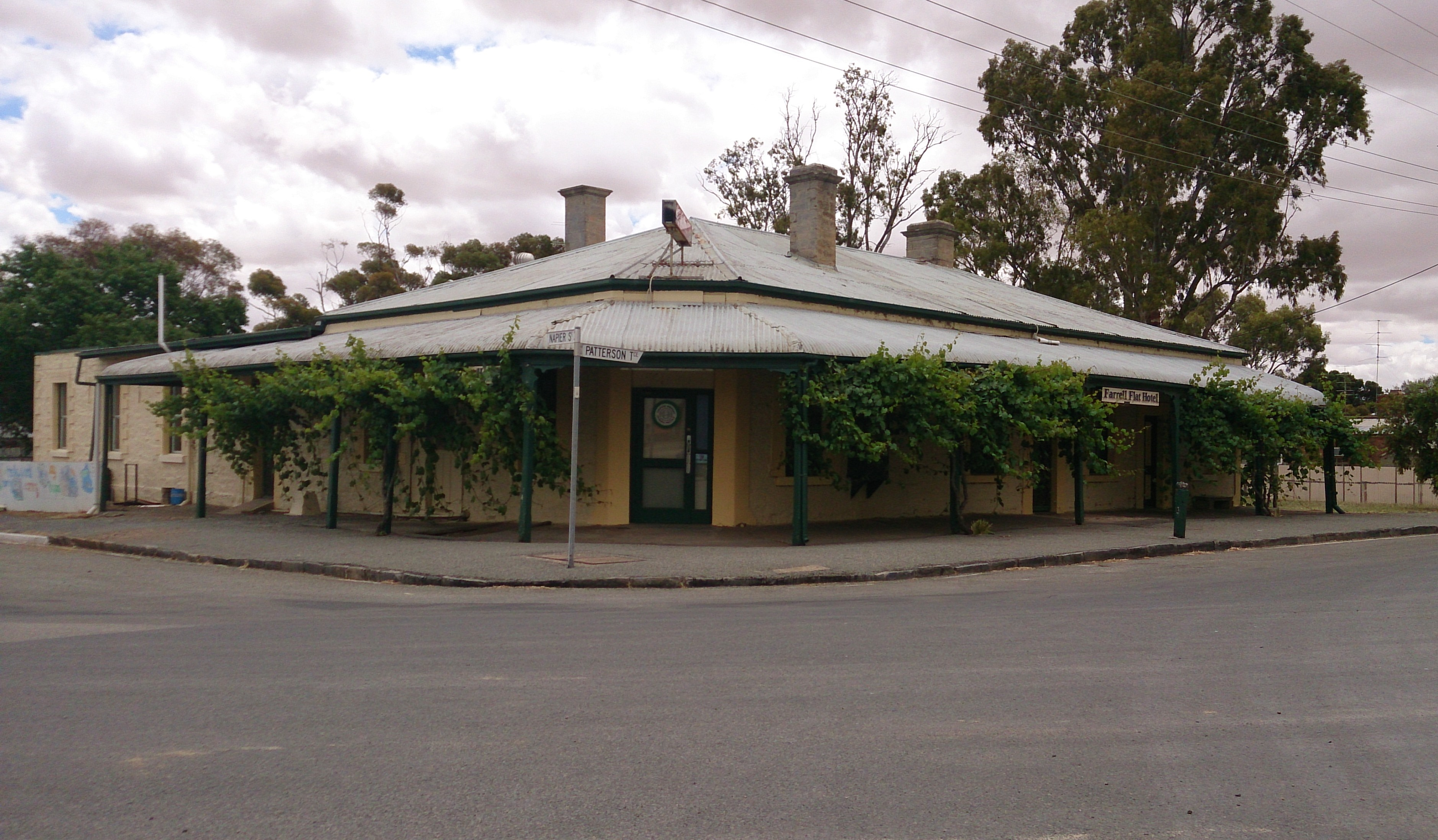
Farrell Flat Hotel in 2013

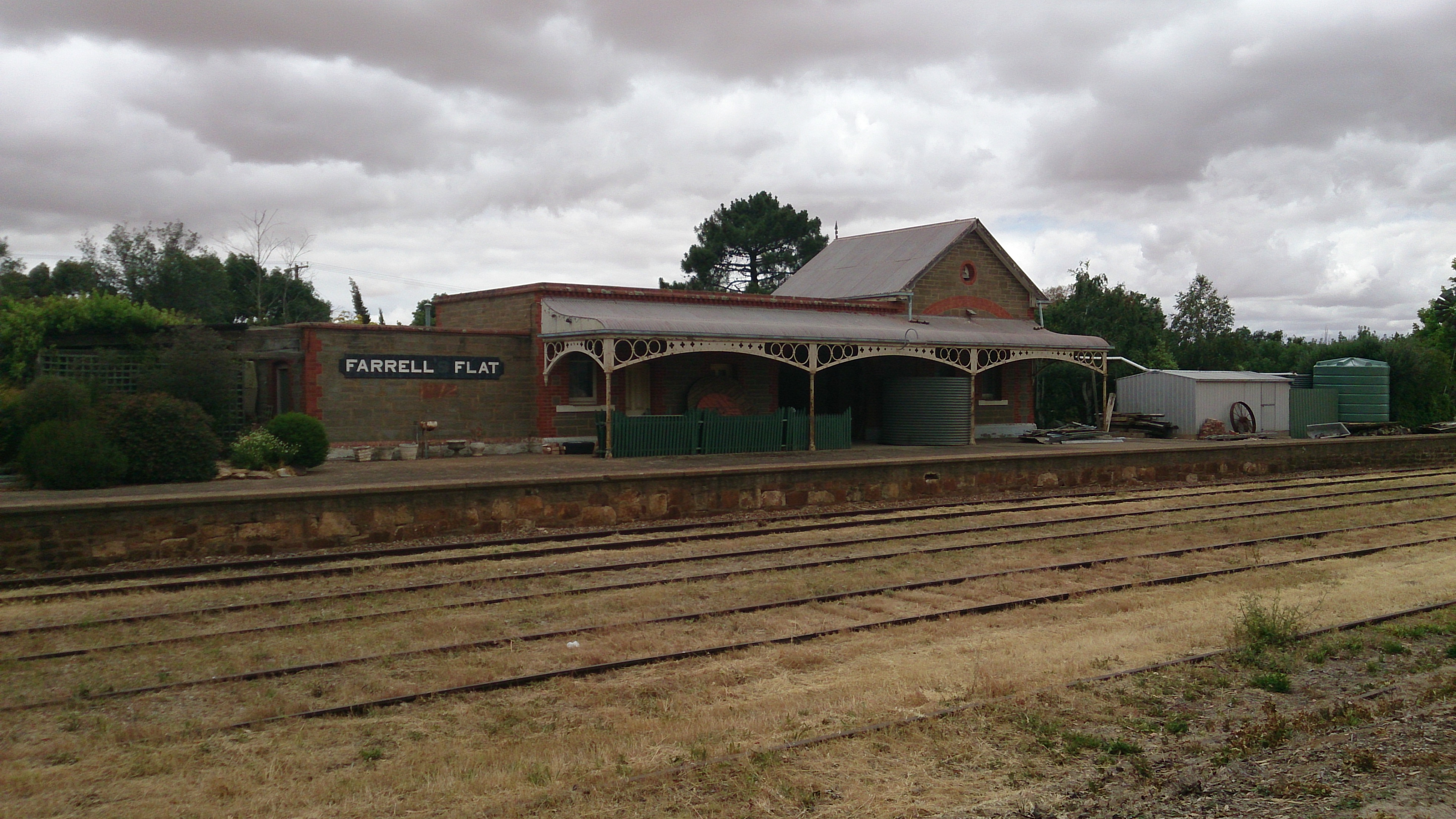
Farrell Flat Railway Station in 2013

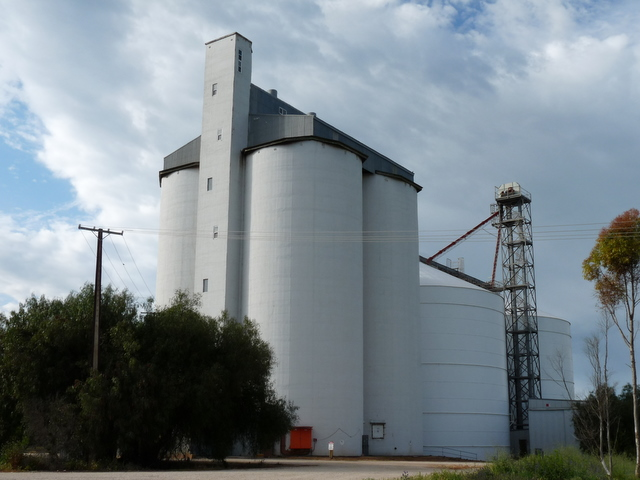
Silos

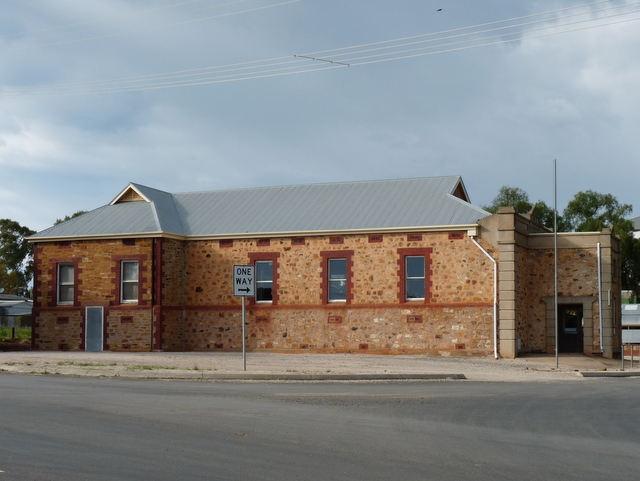
Farrell Flat Institute 1912

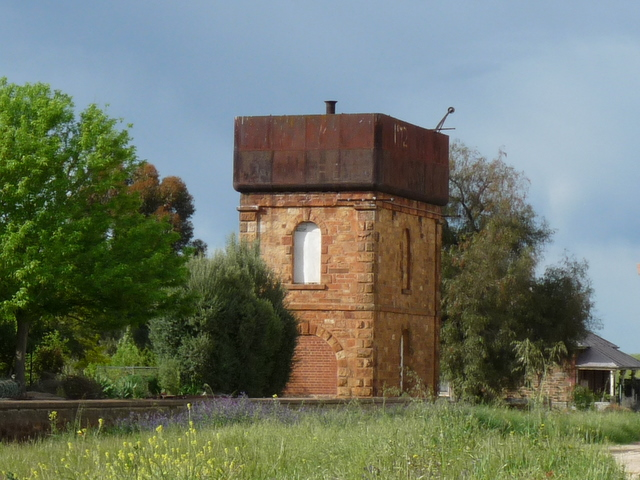
Railway Water Tank

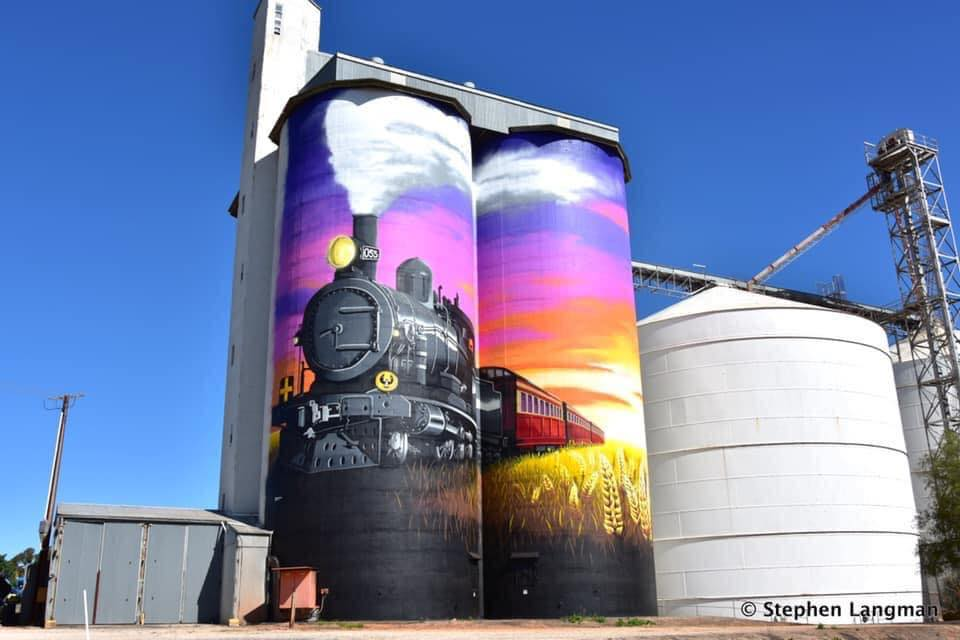
Painted Silos at Farrell Flat

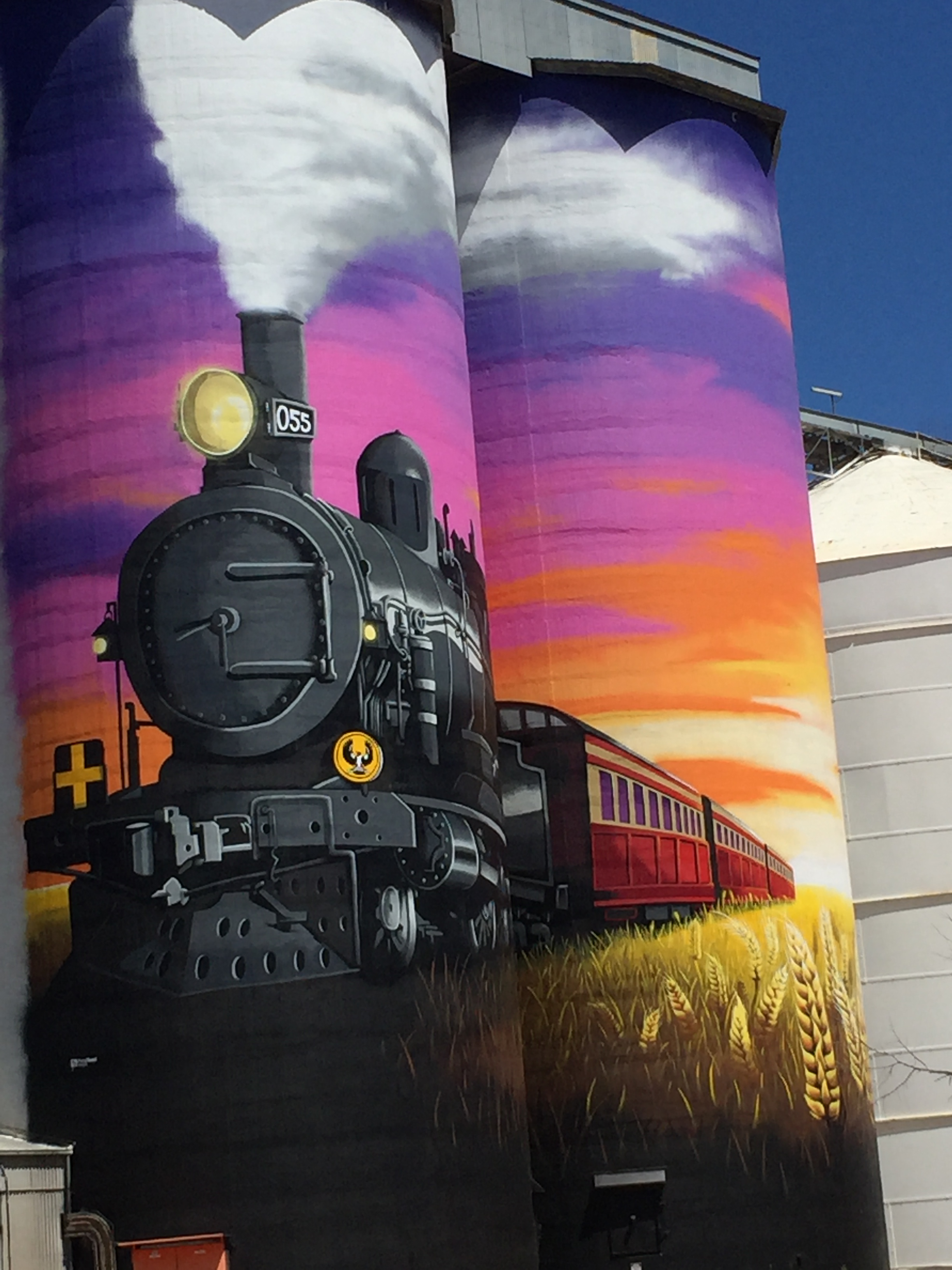
Painted Silos at Farrell Flat
