= Waterloo, South Australia =

Waterloo
- Town
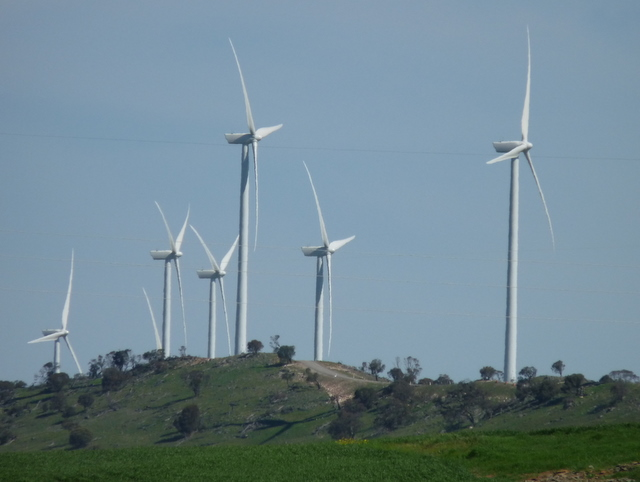
- The Waterloo windfarm looking southwest along the Tothill Range

- Coordinates: 33.992050°S 138.879240°E
- Country: Australia
- State: South Australia
- LGA: District Council of Clare and Gilbert Valleys
- Location: 121 km (75 mi) NE of Adelaide; 7 km (4.3 mi) W of Manoora; 11 km (6.8 mi) S of Black Springs
- Established: 1865

Government
  - State electorate: Frome, Goyder
  - Federal division: Grey

Population
  - Total: 82 (SAL 2016)
- Postcode: 5413
Localities around Waterloo
Black Springs	Black Springs	Apoinga
Manoora	Waterloo	Tothill Belt
Manoora	Steelton	Tothill Belt

Waterloo is a settlement in South Australia, located just off the Barrier Highway between Manoora and Black Springs, approximately 121 kilometres (75 mi) north-east of the state capital of Adelaide.

== History ==
The township of Waterloo was surveyed and established in 1865 in the Hundred of Waterloo, County of Light. It derives its name from the famous battle of the Napoleonic Wars. Waterloo is situated in a valley on the head of the Light River. Located about midway between Kapunda and Burra, it is not to be confused with Waterloo Corner on the Adelaide Plains. In 1866 a petition was signed by 233 of the inhabitants and settlers for the establishment of a police station and courthouse. The government rejected this, as the township then comprised not more than six houses, a flourmill, and a hotel.

The locality is the birthplace of Tom Kruse, the Australian outback mailman who worked on the Birdsville Track in the border area between South Australia and Queensland.

== Land Use ==
Although the township of Waterloo never thrived, it became the service centre for a large rural community, providing such facilities as a school, churches, and shopping. Today it is in the midst of a productive agricultural district, which it continues to service. Windfarms have been established on nearby ranges.

== Kunden (Carlsruhe) ==
Approximately two and one-half kilometre (0.31 miles) south of Waterloo is the locality of Kunden. Originally named Carlsruhe (German: [ˈkaɐ̯lsˌʁuːə] KARLS-roo-uh), it was established in the nineteenth century by German immigrants who built the Carlsruhe Lutheran church and an adjoining cemetery. In 1918 as part of the Act of Parliament to change German place names, Carlsruhe was renamed Kunden. Carlsruhe school had 44 students when it was closed in 1917 as a consequence of law changes that required students to be taught in English rather than German. Today, the locality is now part of the greater Waterloo postcode area and all that remains of its original namesake is the church, cemetery and Carlsruhe Road.
