= Black Springs, South Australia =

Black Springs South Australia
- Coordinates: 33.8965°S 138.8893°E
- Postcode(s): 5413
- Location: 125 km (78 mi) north of Adelaide; 35.1 km (22 mi) east of Clare
- LGA(s): District Council of Clare and Gilbert Valleys
- Region: Mid North
- State electorate(s): Frome
- Federal division(s): Grey
Localities around Black Springs:
Farrell Flat	Porter Lagoon	Koonoona
Stanley; Mintaro	Black Springs	Apoinga
Manoora	Waterloo	Tothill Belt

Black Springs is a locality and former township in South Australia's Mid North region. It lies on the east side of the Barrier Highway between Gawler to the south and Burra to the north. The source of the Wakefield River is a few hundred metres south of the old township.

== Governance ==
Black Springs is governed at the local level by the District Council of Clare and Gilbert Valleys. It lies in the state electoral district of Frome and the federal electoral division of Grey.

== See also ==
- Clare, South Australia
- Hundred of Stanley
