= Emu Downs, South Australia =

Coordinates: 33°54′S 138°58′E

Emu Downs
- Town
- Coordinates
- Country: Australia
- State: South Australia
- LGA: Regional Council of Goyder

Government
  - State electorate: Stuart
  - Federal division: Grey

Population
  - Total: 52 (SAL 2021)
- Postcode: 5381
Localities around Emu Downs
Koonoona	Burra	Worlds End
Apoinga	Emu Downs	Hallelujah Hills
Apoinga	Brady Creek	Robertstown

Emu Downs is a rural locality in the Mid North region of South Australia, situated in the Regional Council of Goyder.

In 1880, the Emu Downs were described as "a vale extending between the Robertstown ranges on the west, and a line of smaller hills on the east. On the western side the country is adapted for sheep, and the stations Anlaby and Koonoona meet. Just within the rainfall line, the crops in most years are fair".

Emu Downs Post Office opened on 1 May 1881, was downgraded to a receiving office on 1 March 1921, upgraded again on 1 July 1927, and then closed permanently on 31 December 1973.

Emu Downs Lutheran Church was dedicated in 1876. The first church closed in 1908, with a new church being built the same year. The second church closed in 1989 and was sold to private buyers; it was severely damaged in a fire but has since been refurbished.

Emu Downs School opened as a Lutheran school as early as 1876. In June 1917, the school was one of 49 "German" schools seized and taken over by the state government in June 1917 as a consequence of World War I, and was reopened in July as a state school. It varied between being classed as a provisional school or primary school in subsequent years depending on numbers, before closing due to dwindling attendance in 1949. In its final year, the Emu Downs teacher lived in a caravan on the school grounds because the nearest available accommodation was four miles away.

The Emu Downs Cemetery is located off Kotz Road, and is maintained by the Russian Molokan Spiritual Christian Leapers & Jumpers Cemetery Inc.

The formal gazetted locality of Emu Downs was established in August 2000. It is located in the cadastral hundred of Apoinga.

== See also ==
- Hopkins Creek Conservation Park
