= Porter Lagoon, South Australia =

Porter Lagoon South Australia
- Coordinates: 33.823550°S 138.877270°E
- Population: 8 (SAL 2021)
- Postcode(s): 5416
- LGA(s): Regional Council of Goyder
- State electorate(s): Stuart
- Federal division(s): Grey
Localities around Porter Lagoon:
Hanson; Farrell Flat	Hanson	Burra
Farrell Flat	Porter Lagoon	Koonoona
Farrell Flat	Black Springs	Koonoona; Black Springs
- Footnotes: Coordinates; Adjoining localities

Porter Lagoon is a rural locality in the Mid North region of South Australia, situated in the Regional Council of Goyder. It was established in August 2000, when boundaries were formalised for the "long established local name". Most of the locality lies in the cadastral Hundred of Hanson; a small strip along the eastern side lies in the Hundred of Apoinga.

The area was originally the territory of the Ngadjuri people. The dominant feature of the locality is the eponymous lagoon. The lagoon can cover several miles in wet seasons, and is "intensely salty". It is used by "many thousands of water birds, pelicans, great cormorants, whiskered terns and silver gulls" at certain times of year.

In the late nineteenth and early twentieth century, it was a popular alternate "seaside" attraction, with visitors coming from across the district. It was a popular venue for aquatic sports when the water level was high enough, had both a boat club and a tennis club, and was also a popular hunting ground when wild fowl were in season. The boat club had tenure of the lagoon in the late 1920s, and banned the drinking of alcohol in the vicinity. In 1935 a newspaper correspondent wrote that the lagoon had been drying up, and was only six inches deep, with the water "always very salt, now positively brine".

In 1939, a correspondent described swimming in Porter Lagoon as "the remedy being worse than the complaint" due to the water being at an exceptionally low level, such that bathers bore a "close resemblance to the Biblical character, Lot's wife, when they emerge from the brine", although they noted that the previous year it had been a "veritable 'sea-side' resort for residents living anywhere near it - hundreds of bathers taking full advantage of its cooling and invigorating prospects. The Porters Lagoon Boat Club ceased to exist on 30 June 1947, having been weakened by a series of dry seasons and the impact of World War II.

By the early 1950s, there was an issue with the provision of facilities at the lagoon, as the District Council of Burra Burra noted that they "had no one who could be made responsible for the maintenance of lavatories, etc., at this locality." In 1954, the Burra Demobilised Soldiers' Association undertook a project to build conveniences such as toilets, dressing sheds and rainwater tanks, and received a license over the north end of the lagoon for that purpose.
