= Brady Creek, South Australia =

Town in Australia

Brady Creek
- Town
- Coordinates: 33°58′S 139°00′E
- Country: Australia
- State: South Australia
- LGA: Regional Council of Goyder

Government
  - State electorate: Stuart
  - Federal division: Grey

Population
  - Total: 19 (SAL 2021)
- Postcode: 5381
Localities around Brady Creek
Apoinga	Emu Downs	Robertstown
Tothill Belt	Brady Creek	Robertstown
Tothill Belt	Ngapala	Robertstown

Brady Creek is a rural locality in the Mid North region of South Australia, situated in the Regional Council of Goyder. It was established in August 2000, when boundaries were formalised for the "long established local name" for the creek which it is centred on and named after. It is divided between the cadastral Hundreds of Apoinga and English.

The area was originally the territory of the Ngadjuri people. Much of the area was part of Anlaby Station after European settlement, although parts of the area were surveyed as early as 1865. In 1906, the Anlaby land was purchased by the state government for closer settlement and was subdivided.

A postal receiving office was opened at Brady Creek on 2 June 1916, was upgraded to a post office on 1 July 1927, and provisionally closed on 11 February 1931; it became a telephone exchange on 5 March 1931, and closed on 22 April 1969. The locality also had a hall and tennis courts.

In 1986, it was noted that while the area was "reliable cropping and grazing land", holdings had grown larger and many of the original families had moved out of the area.
