= Gum Creek, South Australia =

Gum Creek
- Town
- Coordinates: 33°42′46.3″S 138°45′55.8″E
- Country: Australia
- State: South Australia
- LGA: Regional Council of Goyder

Government
  - State electorate: Stuart
  - Federal division: Grey

Population
  - Total: 30 (SAL 2021)
- Postcode: 5417
Localities around Gum Creek
Hilltown	Leighton	Leighton
Hilltown	Gum Creek	Burra
Hill River	Farrell Flat	Hanson

Gum Creek is a rural locality in the Mid North region of South Australia, situated in the Regional Council of Goyder. It was established in August 2000, when boundaries were formalised for the "long established local name". It is named for the Gum Creek pastoral property, which originally extended from Farrell Flat to Mount Bryan, with the homestead being located in the Gum Creek locality. The property was owned by a number of notable figures, with Sir John Duncan succeeding Sir Walter Hughes as owner.

A Primitive Methodist church opened at "Iron Mine, Gum Creek" in October 1871, built by J. & T. Pearce of Kooringa for a cost of £140. A Sunday school at Ironmine Methodist Church, as it came to be known, was built in 1923. The church held a 75th anniversary celebration in April 1946. The church closed in 1974 and was converted to a residence.

Gum Creek School opened in 1898 and closed in 1957. Prior to this, a day school was reported as being run by a Mr. Rogers in the Gum Creek Chapel during the 1870s. The later school building survives today, though is in a derelict state.

A telephone office opened at Gum Creek on 1 May 1926, became a postal receiving office on 3 May 1926 and was upgraded to a post office on 1 July 1927. It closed on 13 March 1953.

It formerly had its own tennis, football and cricket teams.
