= Brady Creek (South Dakota) =

Stream in the United States

Coordinates: 43°54′56″N 101°32′52″W

Brady Creek is a stream in the U.S. state of South Dakota.

Brady Creek has the name of a local cattleman.

== See also ==
- List of rivers of South Dakota
