= Rattler Rail Trail =

Rail trail in South Australia

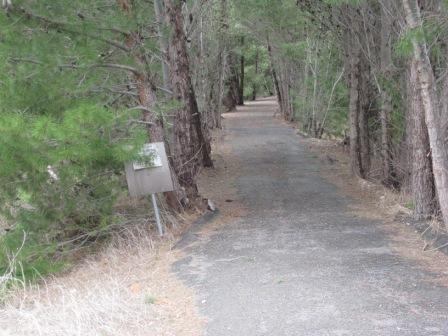
- Rattler Trail, looking to the south from the northern end at Auburn, South Australia
- Length: 19 kilometres (12 miles)
- Location: Mid North
- Established: 2010
- Trailheads: Auburn 34.02614°S 138.68555°E; Riverton34.15393°S 138.75133°E
- Use: Walking, cycling

The Rattler Rail Trail is a 19 km (12 mi) rail trail which joins onto the southern end of the Riesling Trail at Auburn, South Australia. Following the route of the former Spalding railway line, the trail takes its name from the rattling old train that used to ply the route. The Rattler Rail Trail passes through farming land as it wends its way to Riverton via Rhynie. Bike hire is available in the town of Auburn.

The Riesling Trail and Rattler Trail combine to create a walking/cycling trail over 50 kilometres (31 miles) in length, through the Clare Valley wine region and the farming land of the Mid North of South Australia.
