= Hanson, South Australia =

Hanson South Australia
- Coordinates: 33°45′12″S 138°50′25″E
- Population: 23 (SAL 2021)
- Postcode(s): 5417
- Time zone: ACST (UTC+9:30)
  - Summer (DST): ACST (UTC+10:30)
- Location: 123 km (76 mi) N of Adelaide; 29 km (18 mi) NE of Clare; 13 km (8 mi) SW of Burra
- LGA(s): Regional Council of Goyder
- Region: Yorke and Mid North
- County: Stanley
- State electorate(s): Stuart
- Federal division(s): Grey
Mean max temp	Mean min temp	Annual rainfall
21.94 °C; 71 °F	9.0 °C; 48 °F	555.6 mm 21.9 in
Localities around Hanson:
Gum Creek		Burra
	Hanson
Farrell Flat	Porter Lagoon

Hanson (formerly Davies) is a town in South Australia, located 29 kilometres (18 mi) north-east of Clare and 13 kilometres (8.1 mi) south-west of Burra at the intersection of the Barrier Highway and the Hanson-Farrell Flat Road in the Regional Council of Goyder. It is also adjacent to the former Peterborough railway line as the next station towards Adelaide from Burra which was the terminus for some time.

== History ==
The town was surveyed in 1865 and originally known as Daviestown, Davieston, or Davies Town, named after Sir Richard Davies Hanson (1805–76), a Chief Justice of South Australia and acting Governor of the then colony from 1872 to 1873. The first lots were offered for sale first on 30 November 1865. A decision was made around 1890 to rename the town Hanson, although the name was not officially changed until 19 September 1940. The change brought the town's name into line with that of the nearby Hanson railway station. On the same date, the nearby town known as Hanson officially became Farrell Flat, also aligning that town's name with that of its railway station.

Over the years Hanson has comprised a church, a hall, a school, a shop, a railway station and a few houses.

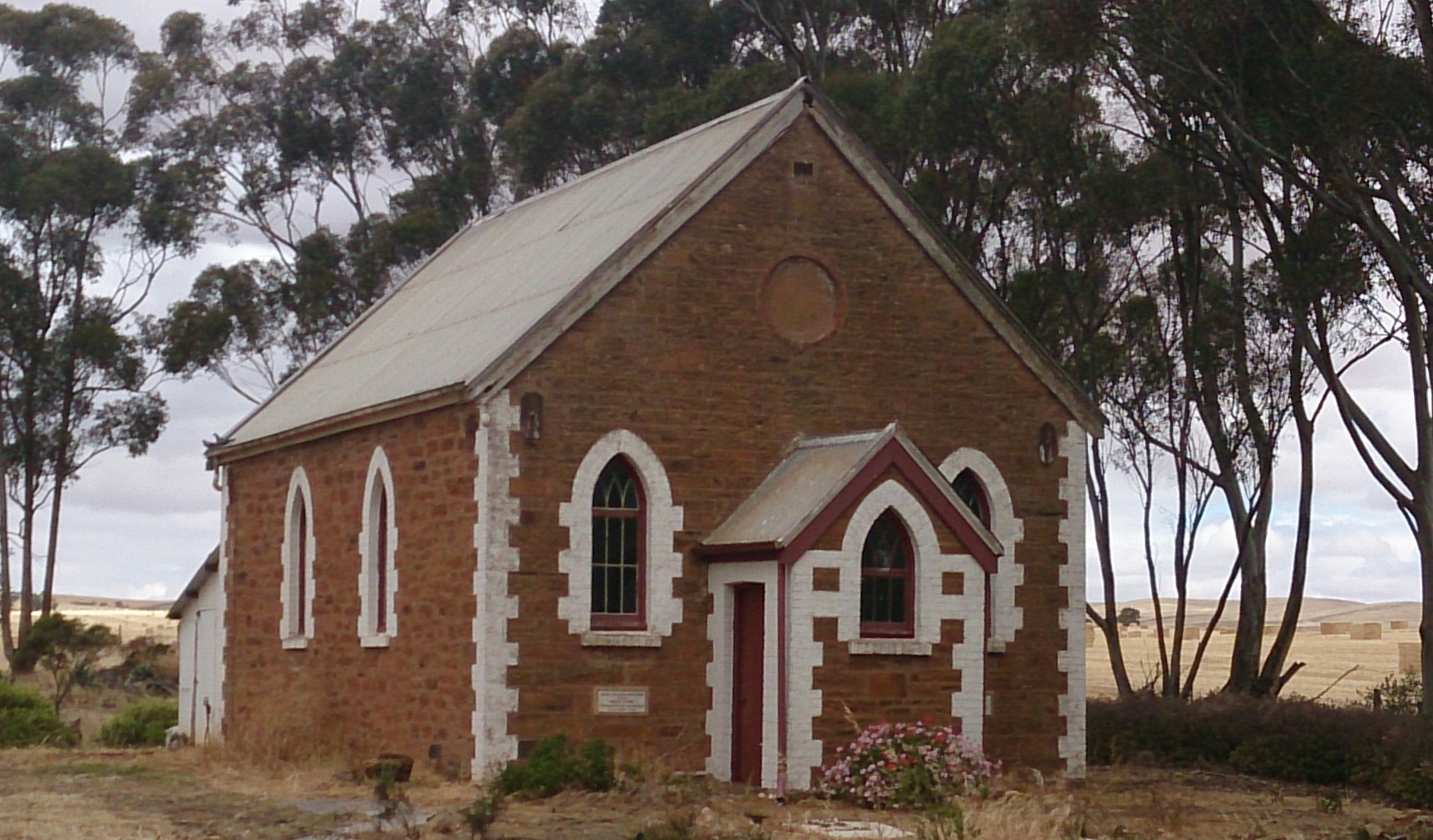
Former Hanson Methodist Church (2013)

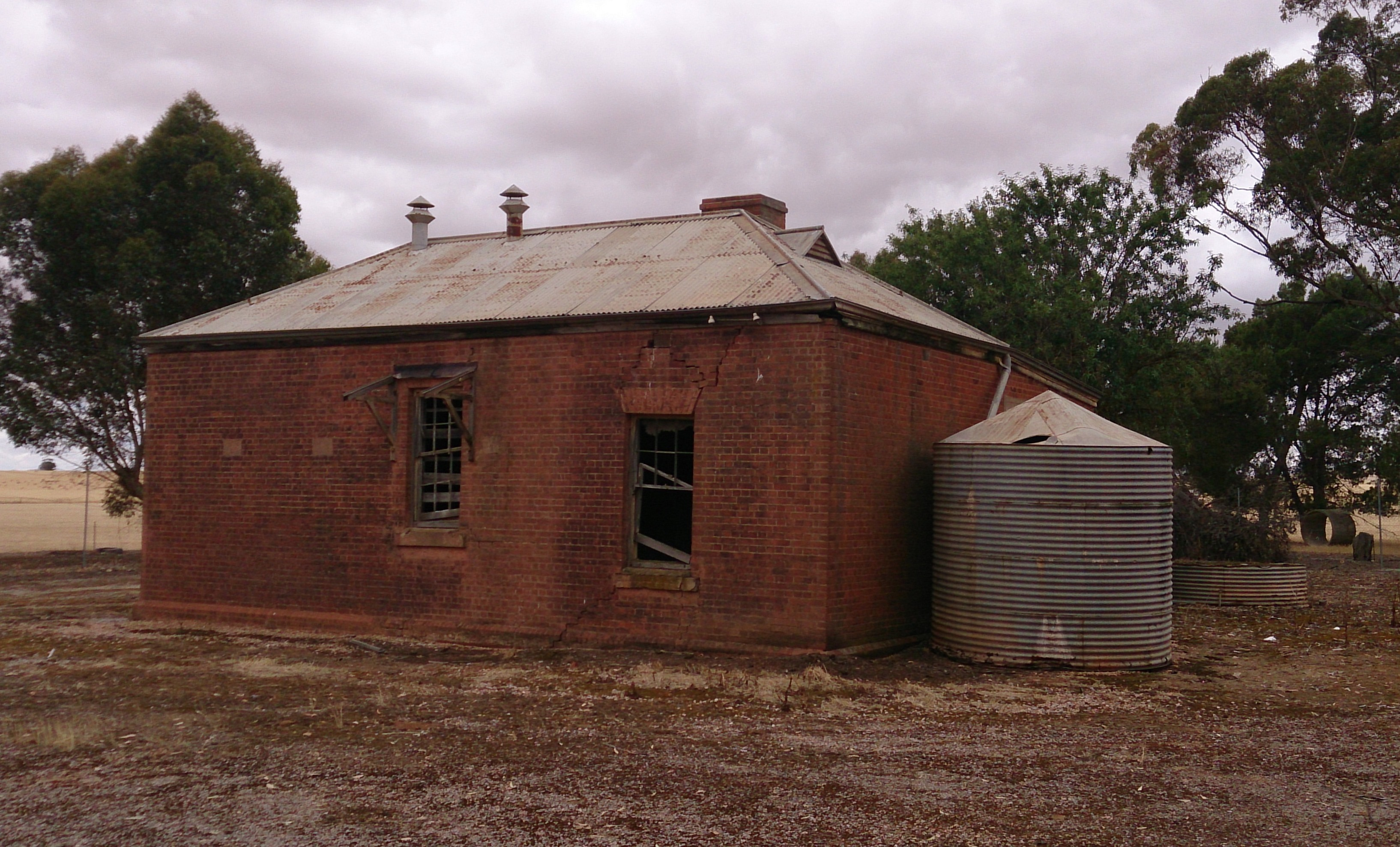
Former Hanson Primary School building (2013)
