= Felix Reader =

German-born Australian chemist and botanist

Felix Maximilian Reader (1850–1911) was a German-born Australian chemist and amateur botanist.

Born in Berlin, he trained as a chemist before emigrating to New Zealand, then shortly afterwards, in the 1880s, to Australia. In the 1890s he settled at Dimboola, Victoria, where he had a chemist's shop until the early 1900s. He was an enthusiastic botanist, publishing many papers in the Victorian Naturalist, establishing himself as an expert on the grasses of the southern Wimmera, and collecting the type specimen of Acacia glandulicarpa. He also amassed a large private herbarium, which he sold to the National Herbarium of Victoria in 1906. Brachycome readeri and Pottia readeri are named in his honour. In 1908, he edited the exsiccata work Plantae Victoriae Australiae exsiccatae.

Over 3,000 specimens collected by Reader are cared for at the National Herbarium of Victoria (MEL), Royal Botanic Gardens Victoria. A smaller collection of specimens are deposited at Te Papa in Aotearoa New Zealand.
