= Spalding railway line =

Former railway line in South Australia

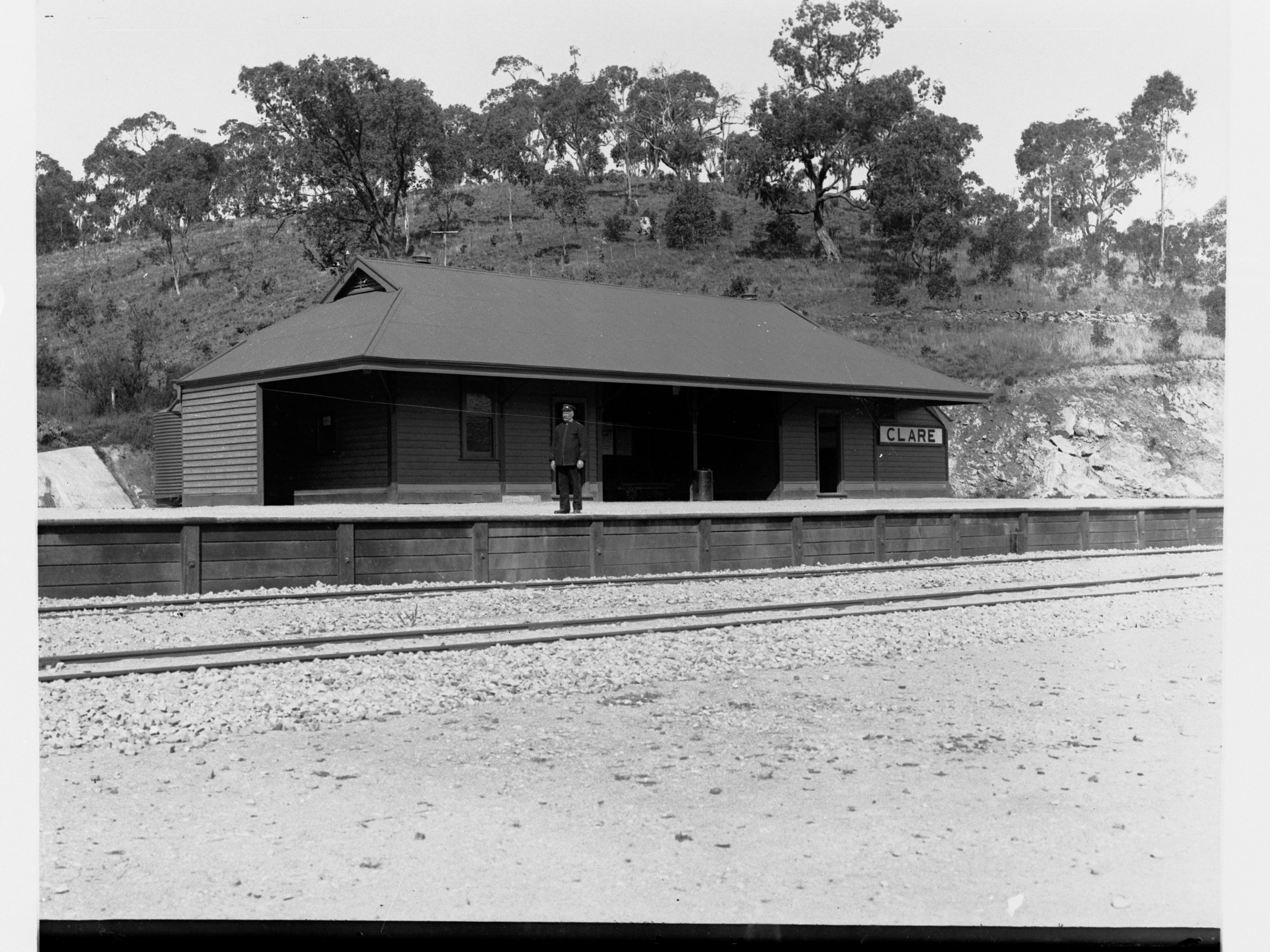
- The railway station at Clare in September 1918, a month after the first section of the Spalding line opened to Clare.

Overview
- Status: Closed and Removed
- Termini: Riverton; Spalding
- Continues from: Peterborough line

Service
- System: South Australian Railways
- Operator(s): South Australian Railways; Australian National

History
- Opened: Riverton-Clare: 5 July 1918; Clare-Spalding: 9 January 1922
- Closed: 17 April 1984

Technical
- Line length: 83.8 km (52.1 mi)
- Track gauge: 1,600 mm (5 ft 3 in)

The Spalding railway line was a railway line on the South Australian Railways network which branched from the Peterborough line at Riverton and passed through the Clare Valley to Spalding. The line opened from Riverton to Clare on 5 July 1918, being extended to Spalding on 9 January 1922. The cessation of railway services was a consequence of the Ash Wednesday bushfires in February 1983, which caused major damage to infrastructure between Sevenhill and Penwortham. The line was formally closed on 17 April 1984.

== Campaign for the railway ==
It was a railway that had been mooted in the 1860s, but was deemed to be too costly on account of the hilly nature of the Clare region. In 1870 railways were constructed to the east (Burra), and the west (Hoyleton) of the Clare region. In 1875 a Railway Commission was established to recommend appropriate expansion of the South Australian railway network, but recommended against a branch line to Clare because no point in the region was more than 15 miles (24 km) from a railway station. The communities of Clare, Watervale and Auburn continued to agitate for the railway. At the start of the 1910s, their cause was championed by Sir Richard Butler, who had briefly been South Australian Premier, and was then Commissioner of Public Works in Archibald Peake's administration. A Royal Commission examined the proposal and determined that a branch-line to Clare would not generate revenue sufficient to cover costs, but extending the line further north towards Spalding would facilitate closer settlement of the pastoral estates, which would in turn generate more revenue. The Riverton to Spalding Railway Act was passed in 1913.

== Construction ==
The line was built with economies that doomed it to inefficient operation. There were tight curves (15 chains (990 ft; 300 m) radius north of Clare), 1:60 grades, second-hand 60 lb (27 kg) rails, and reinforced concrete bridges that were designed for light axle loading. When larger locomotives were introduced on the South Australian Railways in 1926, the Spalding line was unable to carry their greater weight. The motive power up to 1950 was mainly Rx class engines, with the occasional Q class and S class. Commencing early 1951, the line was worked mainly by 750 class locomotives. From 1960 the line was worked by 830 class diesel-electric locomotives.

There was a major bridge over the Broughton River, just south of Spalding. It still stands, and in 1993 it was heritage listed. That listing was a consequence of the inclusion of the bridge in the 1985 book by Colin O'Connor "Spanning Two Centuries - Historic Bridges of Australia". O'Connor's book contains inaccuracies in relation to this bridge. It attributes its design to Alexander Moncrieff, but the contract drawing is signed by Alex's brother Joseph. When the bridge was designed, Alex Moncrieff had not worked for the South Australian Railways for two years. Its 5-arch design was, by engineering standards, more than a decade obsolete when the contract was signed in 1918. Australia's expert on ferro-concrete construction, John Monash, had abandoned that style of bridge by 1906. When the Broughton River bridge was completed in 1919 there was a dispute over payments to the contractor, Joseph Dixon. The matter went to the High Court of Australia, which was critical of Joseph Moncrieff's handling of the contract, yet by a majority the High Court found in favour of the South Australian Railways.

== Safeworking ==
From 1918 to 1922, the safeworking system was the telephone block. With the opening of the line to Spalding in 1922, the line was worked under permissive block conditions. From January 1944 the line was worked by the train order system, operated by Train Control in Adelaide.

== Rail services ==
In 1924 the South Australian Railways began using Model 55 Brill petrol railcars to provide passenger services on rural branch-lines, with Clare being the first destination, commencing on 24 February. Two days earlier, South Australian Premier Sir Henry Barwell hosted a group of officials and members of parliament on a demonstration run to Clare. By the end of 1924, the new railcars had become known in popular parlance as "Barwell Bulls", which was a term coined by one of Barwell's political opponents, with reference to the penetrating bovine sound of the railcar's air-horn.

In 1927 the larger Model 75 Brill railcars operated the passenger service, and continued until 1954. On 24 May 1954, the railcar service was replaced by a co-ordinated road-bus service serving Jamestown and the towns along the Spalding railway line, to connect with trains at Riverton. The main source of outward freight on the line was bulk grain railed from Andrews. However, the rail-haul distance for transporting the grain to the terminal at Port Adelaide was considerably longer than the distance by road haulage to Wallaroo. During the 1970s there was a marked drop in the tonnage of grain railed from Andrews. Spalding became an unattended station in January 1975, and then in July 1978, soon after Australian National Railways took over South Australian country operations, Andrews became the effective terminus, because Spalding was deleted from the Working timetable. The track was lifted in 1989.

== The Riesling Trail ==
In October 1992 the Clare Valley Winemakers Association held a Creative Think Day intended to find a way to distinguish the region's Riesling wine. Tony Brady of Wendouree Cellars suggested a trail be built using the old railway formation, and that it be called the Riesling Trail. He was supported by Evan Hiscock of Petaluma Wines. The proposal gained support from Terry Lavender of the State's Office of Recreation and Sport. In May 1994, two trial sections of The Riesling Trail were officially opened - Sevenhill to Watervale, and Riverton to Rhynie. The Clare Valley Winemakers Association continued to drive development of the Trail, and the section between Clare and Auburn was officially launched on 7 November 1998. In 1999 a community management committee was established. The 19 kilometres (12 mi) section from Riverton through Rhynie to Auburn was subsequently redeveloped as the Rattler Rail Trail and opened in 2010. The original 33 km (21 mi) section from Auburn through the Clare Valley to Clare and beyond was extended northwards to the former Barinia siding, and was opened in November 2009.

A committee in Clare is organising events and displays to mark the centenary of the official ceremony of the opening of the railway to Clare, performed by His Excellency, the Governor, Sir Henry Galway, on 4 July 1918. A book on the history of the railway is being prepared, and is planned to be released in time for the centenary.
