= Barinia =

Barinia South Australia
- Coordinates: 33°44′21″S 138°37′04″E
- Population: 22 (SAL 2021)
- Postcode(s): 5453
- Location: 149 km (93 mi) north of Adelaide; 10 km (6 mi) north of Clare
- LGA(s): District Council of Clare and Gilbert Valleys
- State electorate(s): Frome
- Federal division(s): Grey

The locality of Barinia is situated in South Australia in the Mid North region, approximately 10 km north of Clare. It was a railway siding on the Spalding railway line, which closed in 1984. In November 2009 it became the northern terminus of the Riesling Trail, which utilises the route of the former railway.

== Governance ==
Barinia is governed at the local level by the District Council of Clare and Gilbert Valleys, located within the state electoral district of Frome and the federal electoral division of Spence.

== See also ==
- Clare Valley
