= Andrews, South Australia =

Andrews
- Town
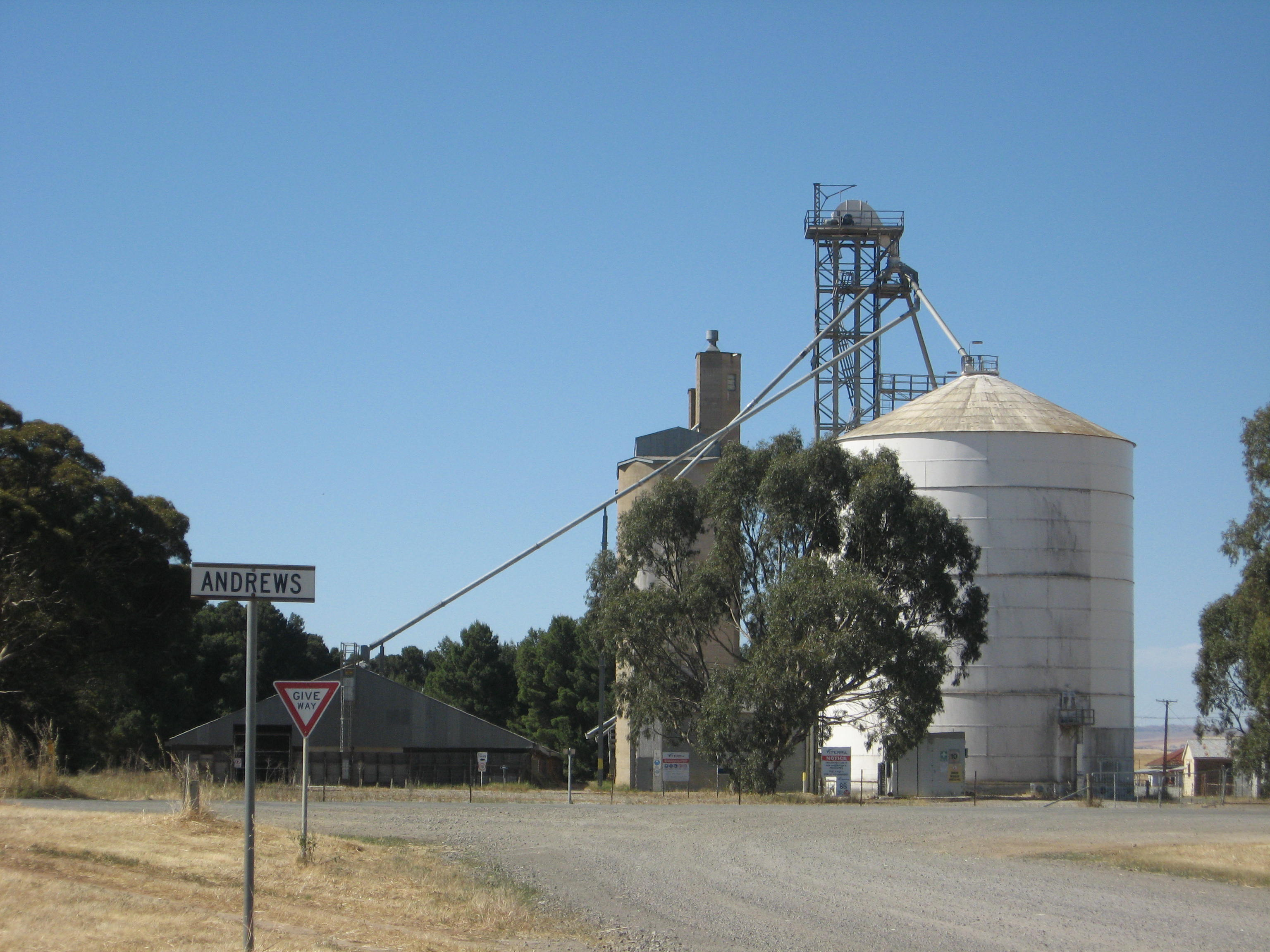
- Grain silos at Andrews

- Coordinates: 33.59°S 138.63°E
- Country: Australia
- State: South Australia
- LGA: Northern Areas Council
- Location: 44 km (27 mi) south of Jamestown, South Australia; 12 km (7.5 mi) south of Spalding
- Established: 1864 (hundred proclaimed); 2001 (locality gazetted)

Government
  - State electorate: Stuart
  - Federal division: Grey

Population
  - Total: 32 (SAL 2021)
- Postcode: 5454
Localities around Andrews
Broughton River Valley	Spalding	Booborowie
Euromina	Andrews	Booborowie; Leighton
Hilltown	Hilltown	Leighton

Andrews is a rural locality in the Northern Areas Council of South Australia, located on the Hill River. Its boundaries were formalised in April 2001 for the long established name for the area. The district, which is primarily dedicated to primary production, mainly grain farming, is in the Spalding Ward of the council. The township has bulk grain handling and storage facilities as well as limited sporting and community facilities. The Hill River Road and the Hill River run north–south through the locality, while Andrews Road runs east–west, connecting the Goyder Highway with RM Williams Way. In the 2011 census, the population of Andrews was too low to separately report; it was included in that of adjacent Spalding.

The original pastoral leases were thrown open for closer settlement when the Hundred of Andrews was proclaimed on 24 November 1864. The Hundred of Andrews has wider boundaries than the modern locality, also including modern Euromina, Broughton River Valley and the southern section of Spalding. The Hundred was named after Richard Bullock Andrews, a South Australian politician and judge. Most of the original land sales took place in 1865. The section of the Hundred of Andrews north of the northern border of adjacent Euromina became part of the District Council of Spalding when it was first proclaimed in 1885; the remainder would later become part of the District Council of Hutt and Hill Rivers until being merged into the Spalding council in 1935. Andrews Post Office opened circa 1922 and closed on 31 December 1979.

The Northern Areas Council Development Plan states that the "bulk handling and storage facilities at Andrews are of strategic importance to the economy of the State and need to be protected from encroachment by incompatible development", and seeks to avoid "incompatible land uses" in the vicinity.
