= Rhynie, South Australia =

Rhynie South Australia
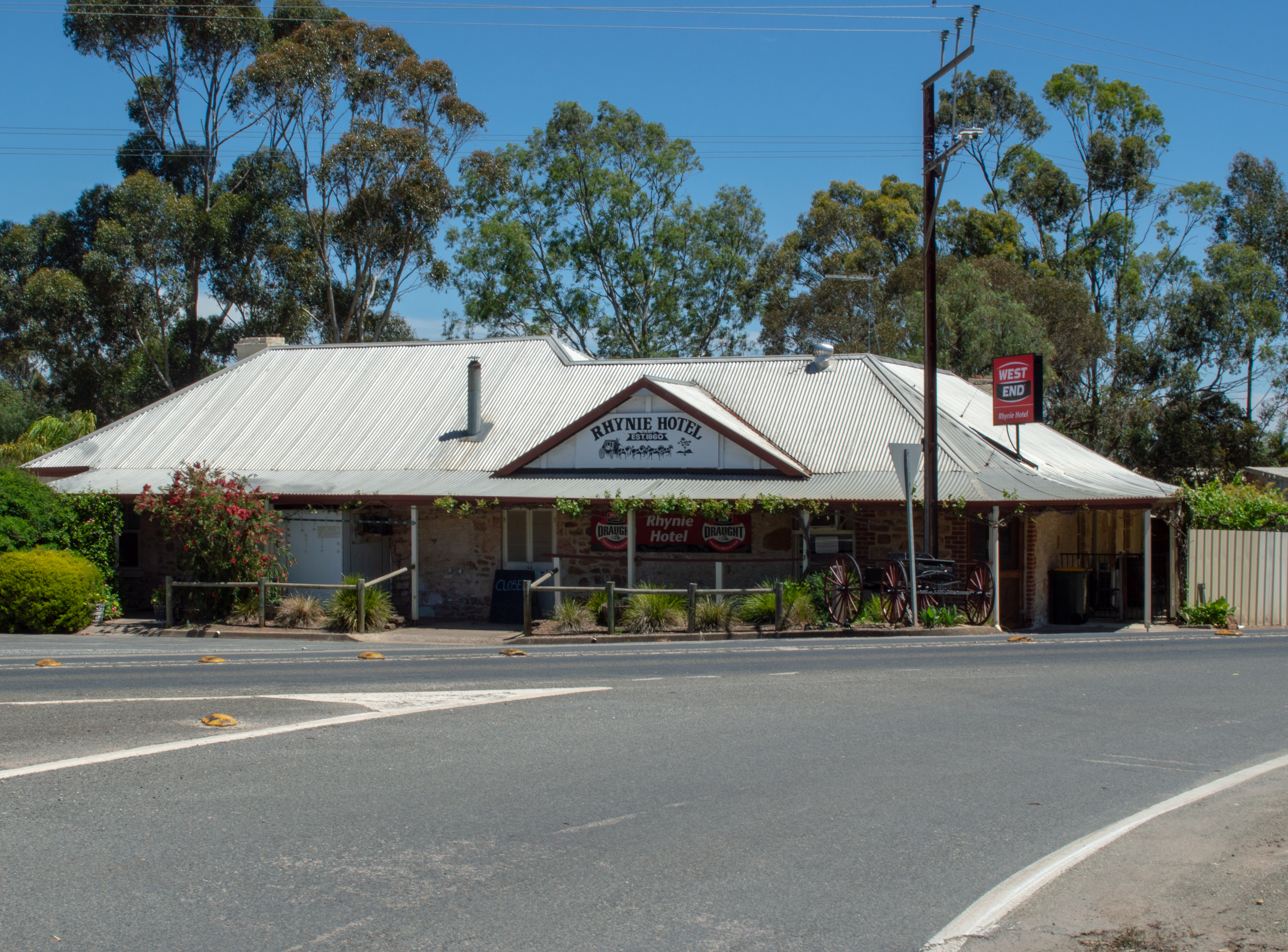
- Rhynie Hotel established 1860

- Coordinates: 34°08′0″S 138°42′0″E
- Population: 138 (SAL 2021)
- Established: 1859
- Postcode(s): 5412
- LGA(s): District Council of Clare and Gilbert Valleys
- Region: Mid North
- State electorate(s): Frome
- Federal division(s): Grey

Rhynie is a small town in South Australia, halfway between Tarlee and Auburn, along the Horrocks Highway. It was surveyed and founded in 1859.

Rhynie was on the Spalding railway line, which was closed in April 1984 and replaced by the Rattler Rail Trail cycling and walking path.

The town is within the District Council of Clare and Gilbert Valleys area.

Missionary, Annie Lock, was born in Rhynie.
