= Manoora, South Australia =

Manoora South Australia
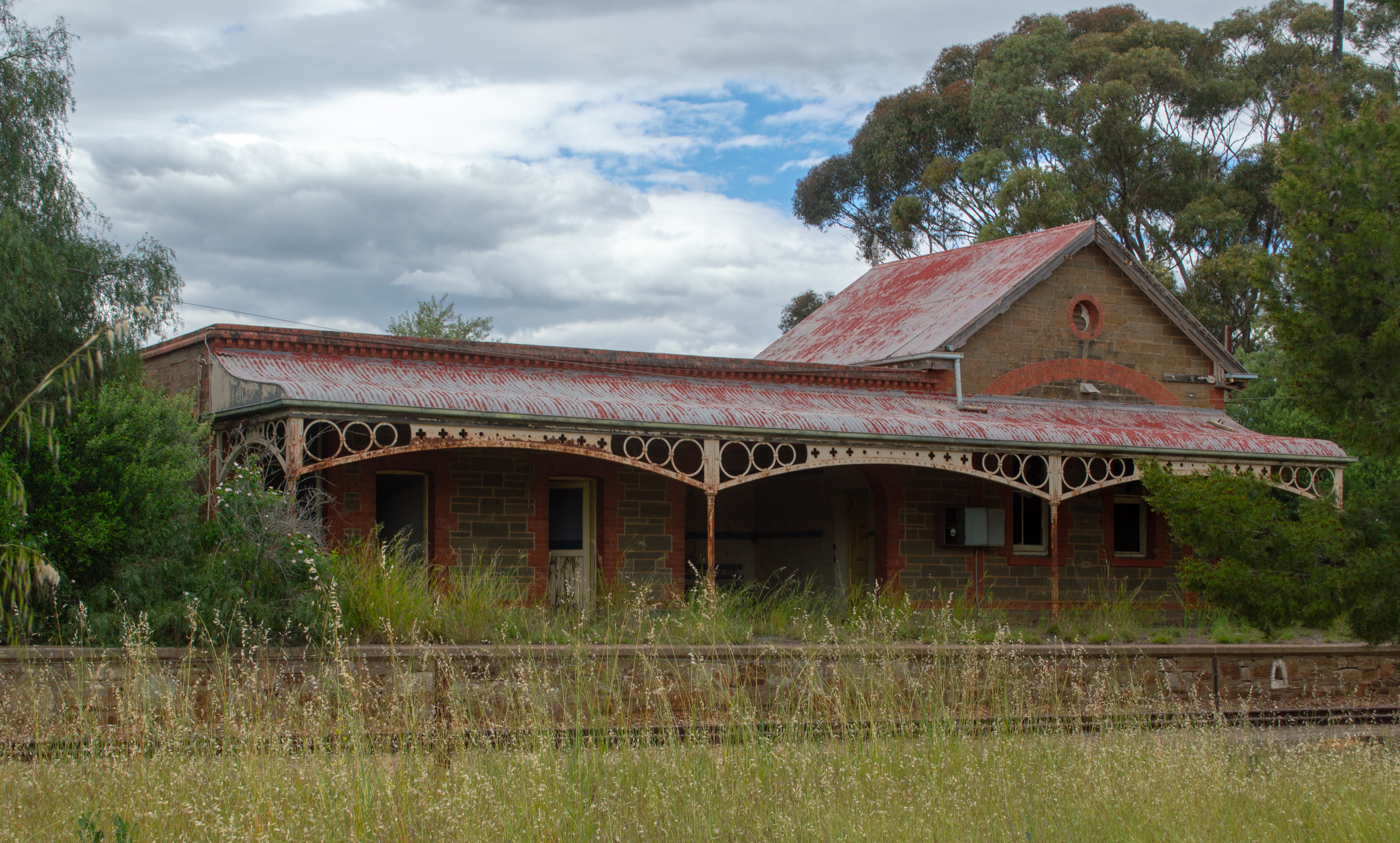
- Former Manoora railway station

- Coordinates: 34.0006°S 138.8174°E
- Population: 134 (SAL 2021)
- Postcode(s): 5414
- Location: 114 km (71 mi) north of Adelaide; 42 km (26 mi) south of Burra; 27 km (17 mi) NE of Giles Corner
- LGA(s): Clare and Gilbert Valleys Council
- State electorate(s): Electoral district of Frome
- Federal division(s): Grey
Localities around Manoora:
Mintaro	Stanley	Black Springs
Watervale	Manoora	Waterloo
Auburn	Saddleworth	Steelton

Manoora is a settlement in the Mid North region of South Australia on the Barrier Highway and upper reaches of the Gilbert River. At the 2021 Australian census, the population was 134.

== History of settlement ==
The first Europeans to settle at Manoora, during the British colonisation of South Australia in about 1841, were the sheep pastoralists Edward and William Peter, of Scottish origin. Having established their head station near present Manoora, for a few years the brothers (or cousins) held extensive occupation licences reaching toward the Kapunda and Burra districts.

Manoora is named for another early station in the district owned by A. W. J. Grant. The name is believed to be derived from a Aboriginal name for a spring or water.

== Demographics ==
At the 2006 census, Manoora had a population of 277.

By the time of the 2021 census, this number had shrunk to 134, of whom 54% were male.

== Railway ==
Manoora became the temporary terminus of a broad-gauge railway line from Roseworthy in February 1870. It was later extended further to the towns of Terowie and Peterborough in the 1880s. Regular passenger trains ended in 1986. The line was formally closed in March 2004.

== Stone ==
Sandstone was quarried at Manoora from the 19th century, which was variously known as Manoora freestone, which became known as Manoora sandstone or Manoora stone.

In 1877, "Manoora freestone" was used in the construction of the new Adelaide Institute and Marine Offices in Port Adelaide. At that time, John Kelsh was the proprietor of the Manoora quarries. In 1878, a new building for the German Club was built in Pirie Street, Adelaide, the lower level of which was built from Manoora Stone.

In 1878 the foundation stone for the new Public Library of South Australia (now the Mortlock Chamber, part of the State Library of South Australia) was laid, designed by colonial architect E. J. Woods. The walls were built of brick with Sydney freestone facings, while decorations were made from Manoora stone, which had a darker colour.

The stone was used extensively in the 1960s.

== Ship ==
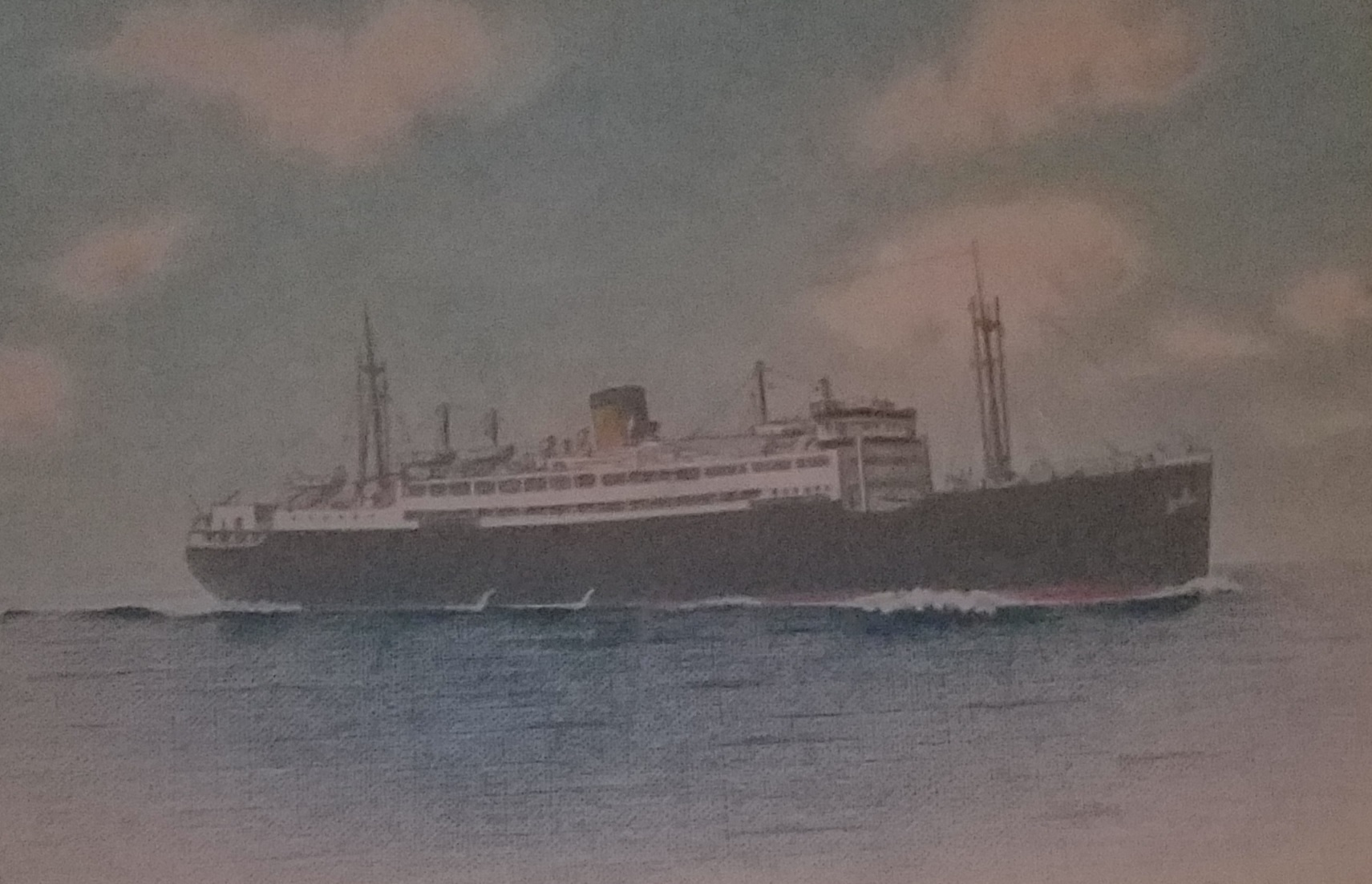
MV Manoora 6 June 1937

HMAS Manoora was named after Manoora, South Australia. She was built in Scotland in 1935 for the Cairns-to-Fremantle coastal passenger run for the Adelaide Steamship Company. She was requisitioned by the Royal Australian Navy for naval service in 1939.
