= Joseph S. Cole =

Australian educator (c.1831–1916)

Joseph Stear Carlyon Cole (c. 1831 – 15 October 1916) was an educator in South Australia, the founder of Stanley Grammar School in Watervale, South Australia. For most of his life, he was referred to as Joseph S. Cole or Joseph St. Cole (!); then around 1885, he began calling himself Carlyon or J. S. Carlyon Cole.

== History ==
Cole was born in the City of Exeter in Devon, where he was educated by Matthew Bennett of the Oakhampton Street Grammar School, by his father George Talbert Cole, and by his father's friend Dr. Radford, perhaps the paediatrician and gynaecologist Thomas Radford MD (1793–1881).

He was brought up in the Church of England, confirmed by Dr. Philpotts, and sang in the choir at Exeter Cathedral. He was enrolled to spend a few years at Exeter College, Oxford but was pulled out by his uncle John Clifton, manager for the noted builder Thomas Cubitt, who had secured a position for the lad in London, which he was pleased to accept. The next nine years was a great experience for him, as he was able to learn a great deal at the nearby Birkbeck School, University College, Royal Institute, and the Royal College of Chemistry. He left his uncle and found lodgings at Lincoln's Inn Fields, where he socialised with members of the legal profession and began reading for Law. He was responsible for introducing a friend's poetry to Mr. Justice Talfourd (died 1854).

In 1856, Sapper Cpl John Coles (24 April 1886), an uncle on his mother's side, invited Cole to join him in Penwortham, South Australia. Cpl Coles was on Grey's 1837–38 expedition to the North West of Australia and 1839 expedition to the West, and with Eyre in 1840. In 1842, Coles lost all four fingers of his right hand in a feu de joie accident and had to be pensioned off, and secured a position as Crown Lands ranger.

What Coles' plans for his nephew were are unclear, but an opportunity arose at nearby Auburn, where plans for a day school initiated by William Hocking, previously of the Burra, had fallen through, and the town's unofficial "mayor", Joseph Edwin "Joe" Bleechmore, publican of the "Rising Sun" and friend of Coles, suggested Cole take it over. The school opened 28 May 1855 in the New Chapel, and under Cole's tutorship the children's education developed remarkably. Cole resigned in mid 1858, to be replaced by the Rev. Edward Newlyn. The Auburn school closed briefly to enable refurbishment of the building.

Cole was appointed to the new school in Watervale, whose 59 students initially met in the Bible Christian chapel, awaiting the completion of the new publicly funded schoolhouse, which opened on 17 February 1859. In mid 1861, Cole accepted a position as the first headmaster of the re-opened Pulteney Street School, which he relinquished three months later to resume mastership of Watervale school, which had been closed from June to September for lack of a teacher.

He purchased the block of land between the schoolhouse and Commercial Street, and in 1863 began construction of his private school, with four rooms at the rear section of what would become the present two-storey structure. In 1871, the building was extended upward, with four dormitories on the upper floor. A new section was added at ground floor level with another two dormitories above. In 1876, the process of transferring ownership of the schoolhouse from the Council of Education to the District Council was underway.

In 1878, Cole relinquished his teacher's licence so he could run his school independently of the Council of Education. He made an offer (which was rejected) to purchase that building to become part of his private school.

Joseph died in 1916. His wife, Hannah, died in 1928. Their remains were buried in St Marks's churchyard, Penwortham.

== Other interests ==
- He was the first clerk of the Auburn Local Court.
- He was the first clerk of the Wakefield District Council.
- He was appointed by Anthony Forster as Auburn correspondent for the South Australian Register.
- He was hon. secretary of the Watervale branch of the British and Foreign Bible Society.
- He was an active member of the International Order of Odd Fellows.

== Family ==
Joseph Stear Carlyon Cole (c. 1831 – 15 October 1916) married Hannah Peacock (c. March 1842 – 24 August 1928) on 29 November 1862. Hannah was a sister of Henry Furneaux Peacock.

- Florence Jane Cole (1863 – 3 August 1936) married Alfred Tom Patrick ( – ) in 1888, lived in Swanbourne, Western Australia
- Ada Lucy Cole (1865 – 1 February 1890)
- Jessie Edith Cole ( – c. 3 March 1949)
- Clement George Cole (1871 – 4 September 1931), of Fremantle, died at Watervale
- Alice Jennie Cole ( – ), also of Fremantle
- Mabel Mary Cole (1875– )

The explorer John Coles (5 December 1814 – April 1886) was a maternal uncle; presumably a brother of his mother.
