= Eyre Creek (South Australia) =

Eyre
- Location of the river mouth in South Australia
- Etymology: Edward John Eyre

Location
- Country: Australia
- State: South Australia
- Region: Mid North

Physical characteristics
- Source
  - location: near Mount Horrocks
- Mouth: confluence with the Wakefield River
  - location: Auburn
  - coordinates: 34°01′05″S 138°41′10″E

The Eyre Creek is an ephemeral watercourse in the Mid North region of the Australian state of South Australia.

== Course and features ==
The creek rises east of Mount Horrocks and drains south through Watervale and Leasingham before reaching its confluence with the Wakefield River north of Auburn in the Clare Valley. The creek runs along Main North Road.

The creek was named in honour of Edward John Eyre, who explored the area in 1839 during one of his expeditions.

== See also ==
- List of rivers of Australia § South Australia
