= Walter Duncan =

Walter Duncan may refer to:

- Walter Leslie Duncan (1883–1947), Australian politician
- Walter Gordon Duncan (1885–1963), politician in South Australia
- Walter Hughes Duncan (1848–1906), pastoralist and politician in South Australia
- Walter Jack Duncan (1881–1941), United States Army war artist
- Walter Duncan (painter) (1848–1932), British painter
- J. Walter Duncan, American businessman
