= John Duncan (Australian politician) =

Australian politician (1845–1913)

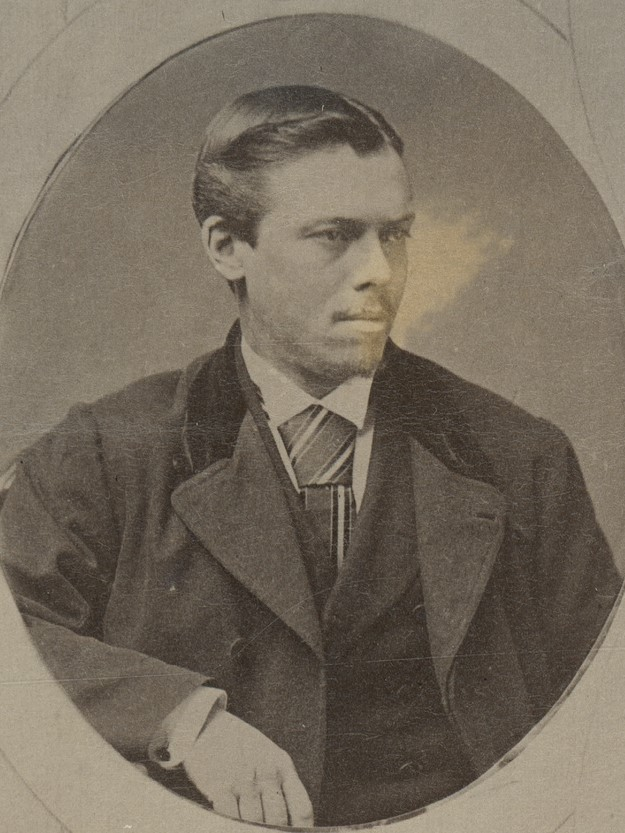

Member of the South Australian House of Assembly for Port Adelaide
- In office 1871–1875

Member of the South Australian House of Assembly for Wallaroo
- In office 1875–1877

Member of the South Australian House of Assembly for Wooroora
- In office 1884–1890

Member of the South Australian Legislative Council
- In office 03 Mar 1900 – 8 October 1913
- Succeeded by: Sir David Gordon

Personal details
- Born: 12 February 1845 Anstruther, Fifeshire, Scotland
- Died: 8 October 1913 (aged 68) North Adelaide, South Australia

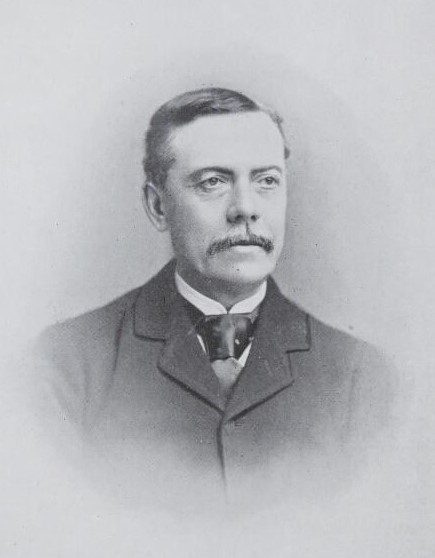

Sir John James Duncan (12 February 1845 – 8 October 1913) was a politician in the colony and State of South Australia.

== History ==
Duncan was born the elder son of (sea) Captain J. Duncan in Anstruther, Fifeshire, Scotland, and came out to South Australia with his parents in 1854; his father was a partner with his brother-in-law Sir Walter W. Hughes, who was running sheep and cattle at Hoyle's Plains and on Yorke Peninsula in the vicinity of Wallaroo and Moonta.

He was first educated privately, then at Bentley (near Gawler), Stanley Grammar School at Watervale, then at St Peter's College. On leaving school he found employment as a clerk for Elder, Smith, & Co., then was put in charge of the finance department of the smelting works, and then the mines at Wallaroo. He then took charge of several pastoral properties of his uncle, on whose death he inherited the Gum Creek (near Burra) and Hughes Park estates. The latter property had an ideal country house to the west of Watervale, where he spent the summer months, and concentrated on sheep-breeding.

== Politics ==
In 1871, at 26 years of age, he was elected to the Port Adelaide seat in the South Australian House of Assembly, then when that district was broken up in 1875, to the seat of Wallaroo. He resigned in 1877 to make a trip to Europe, and while in France acted as a commissioner for South Australia at the Paris Exhibition in 1878. In 1884 he was elected to the seat of Wooroora, and held that seat until 1890 when he resigned to assist in creating the National Defence League. The following year he was elected to the Legislative Council for the North-Eastern district. In 1896 he retired to visit England. In 1900 he was returned unopposed, and from 1901 was leader of the Liberal Party, and served on the Legislative Council until his death.

== Other interests ==
Duncan was a trustee of the State Savings Bank, and for some years, a director of the Wallaroo and Moonta Mining and Smelting Company, Ltd., and the Adelaide Steamship Company and Adelaide Steam-tug Company. He was president of the Pastoral Association of South Australia and West Darling from 1905 to 1907. He was for many years on the Upper Wakefield District Council, and its chairman for several years. He was also president of the Australian National League, which became the Liberal Union. He was a life governor of the Adelaide Children's Hospital. He was created a Knight Bachelor in 1912.

He died at a private hospital in North Adelaide following an operation for gallstones and was buried at Penwortham cemetery. Of his considerable fortune he left a large sum to a wide range of church and charitable institutions, including the General Assembly of the Presbyterian Church of South Australia, the Flinders Street Presbyterian Church, St Mark's Church, at Penwortham, the Home for Incurables, the Adelaide Children's Hospital, South Australian Institution for the Blind and Deaf and Dumb, the Royal Institution for the Blind (formerly Industrial School for the Blind), the Home for Weak-minded Children, and the University of Adelaide.

== Family ==
Sir John was a nephew of Sir Walter Watson Hughes, and a brother of Walter Hughes Duncan MP (29 April 1848 – 12 May 1906).

He was twice married. He married Jane Morrison in November 1873; she died a year later. He married Jean Gordon Grant of Westbourne Park on 27 August 1879. They lived at Hughes Park, Watervale and at "Strathspey", Mitcham. He had two daughters: M. H. Duncan and Jean Duncan, and four sons: John Grant (Jack) Duncan-Hughes, Sir Walter Gordon Duncan, Keith Duncan and Colin Duncan.

Parliament of South Australia
Preceded by William Quin	Member for Port Adelaide; 1871–1875	Succeeded by William Quin
