= Leasingham, South Australia =

Coordinates: 33°58′S 138°39′E

Leasingham South Australia
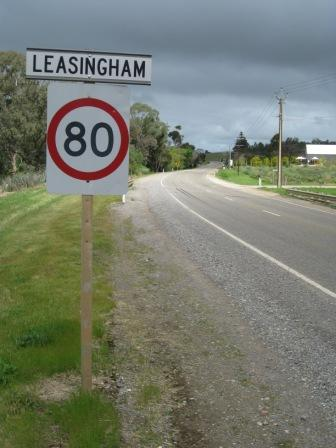
- Northern entrance sign, Leasingham
- Population: 114 (SAL 2021)
- Established: 1853
- Postcode(s): 5452
- Location: 117 km (73 mi) north of Adelaide; 17 km (11 mi) south of Clare
- LGA(s): District Council of Clare and Gilbert Valleys
- Region: Mid North
- State electorate(s): Frome
- Federal division(s): Grey
Localities around Leasingham:
Kybunga	Penwortham; Watervale	Mintaro
Hoyleton	Leasingham	Manoora
Halbury	Auburn	Auburn

Leasingham is the name of a hamlet on the southern edge of the Clare Valley, in the Mid North of South Australia. It is approximately 117 kilometres from the state's capital, Adelaide and 17 kilometres south of the town of Clare.

Although the surrounding country is elevated, the township is located in lower country at the intersection of Main North Road and the connecting roads to Mintaro (to the East) and Hoyleton (to the West). Leasingham is bisected by the Eyre Creek as it makes its way to the Wakefield River. The Riesling Trail is on the western fringe of the township, following the former railway route between Auburn and Clare.

== History ==
The Leasingham district was the ancestral home of the Ngadjuri people. The first European explorer, John Hill, passed through the district in April 1839. Surveys soon followed, the township being named after the village and civil parish of Leasingham in Lincolnshire, England and the site was once owned by E. Campbell, who held approximately 120 hectares (60 acres) of freehold land, which he sold in 1853. By 1866 Leasingham had about 130 residents and, although ribbon development occurred around the Main North Road crossroad, it never prospered into a town.

== Governance ==
Leasingham is in the District Council of Clare and Gilbert Valleys, the state electoral district of Frome, and the Australian House of Representatives Division of Grey.

== Land use ==
Leasingham is an agricultural district in which dry grain farming predominates. Additionally, being centrally located in quite a picturesque district, it caters for tourism and has a restaurant, caravan park, bed and breakfast accommodation and a number of tasting/cellar door sales operations of local wineries.
