= William George Torr =

Australian educator (1853–1939)

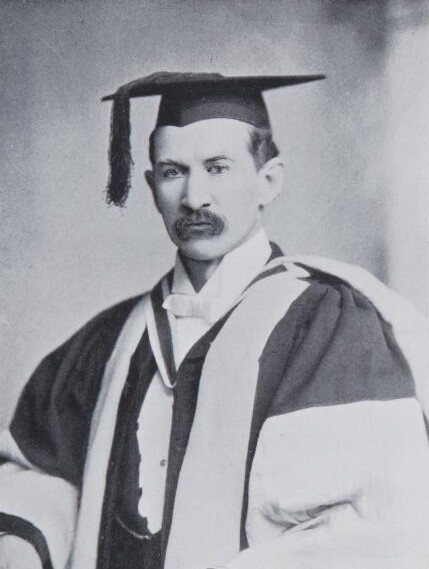
Torr in 1901

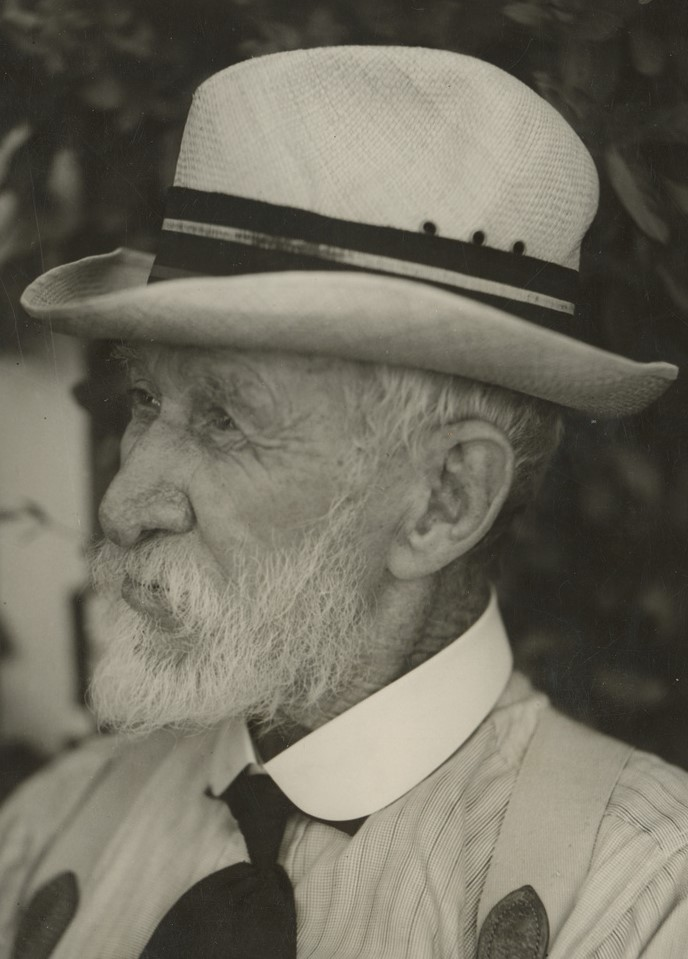
Torr in 1937

William George Torr MA, BCL, LLD (29 March 1853 – 13 September 1939), often referred to as "Old Oxford", was a religious educator in South Australia.

== History ==
William G. Torr was a son of John Torr (c. 1815 – 14 February 1884) of Tavistock, Devon, who with his wife Ann Montrose Torr, née Green, and family emigrated to Burra, South Australia, arriving on the Hooghly in 1855. William was educated there and at Stanley Grammar School, Watervale, before taking up work on a sheep station in Tasmania.

He started his working life as a teacher at Ulooloo (Note: Ulooloo was a goldfields town midway between Hallett and Whyte-Yarcowie) in 1872, and gained experience as an assistant at the City Model School, Grote Street, an institution devoted to giving young teachers practical experience, from 1875. The following year he was in charge of a new class intended to give a few student teachers experience in running a small country school. During his stay in Adelaide he also took Bible classes at the Bible Christian church in Young Street, Adelaide. In 1878 he was appointed headmaster of the Moonta Mines Model School.

He visited England around late 1884 or early 1885, possibly to enroll as a student with Oxford University, as around the end of 1885 he resigned his position with the Education Department to undertake studies preparatory to his taking charge of Way College, which was then being planned. He then studied at Oxford, where he gained his MA and BCL, then Cambridge, where he gained his LLD.

Way College, (Note: The College occupied a building, formerly Dr Joyce's Eye Infirmary, on Park Terrace, North Unley (renamed Greenhill Road, Parkside). After closure of the College, the building was taken over by Methodist Ladies' College (later Annesley College).) named for Rev. James Way, was opened in 1892 for the Bible Christian and Primitive Methodist denominations as a religious school for boys and to prepare students for the ministry. Torr was appointed first headmaster, and was succeeded by Frank Lade, but stayed on as an assistant. Following Methodist union in 1900, the work of Way College was taken over by Prince Alfred College, and the school closed at the end of 1903. Torr founded Brighton Training College, opened in 1909, devoted to training young men for the ministry, with residential accommodation built at his own expense. This function was taken over around 1925 by Wesley College, North Unley, and the home, renamed "Old Oxford House", became a Methodist retreat and memorial to Torr and his assistant Rev. John Thorne.

He was an authority on chitons, and made numerous collecting expeditions with Sir Joseph Verco. He was a keen player of bowls, and was first captain of the Brighton Bowling Club.

He contributed over 1800 weekly articles in the series "Talks with Young Men" to Australian Christian Commonwealth, official organ of the Methodist Church.

== Recognition ==
- Torr Avenue Brighton, a new thoroughfare which was created when a property belonging to the S.A. Blind, Deaf and Dumb Institution, was subdivided, was named for him.
- A stained-glass window at the Brighton Methodist Church was dedicated to his memory.

== Family ==
Torr's siblings included:

- Sophia Jane Torr (c. 1838 – 29 November 1917) married James Brown of Mintaro, South Australia in 1856

- William Jethro Brown (29 March 1868 – 27 May 1930)

- Mrs R. Dale of Bath, England
- James Cotton Torr (c. 1841 – 24 March 1921) of "Roseneath", Upper Mitcham
- John Sampson Torr (c. 1846 – 30 October 1932) of Redhill, South Australia

- (Florence) Laura Torr (born 1878) married William Arthur Brown on 15 April 1895

- Thomas Torr (c. 1848 – 6 October 1939), also of Redhill
- Eliza Ann Torr (16 November 1855 – c. 28 March 1935) married Milton Moss Maughan (2 November 1866 – 1921), son of James Maughan, on 6 August 1880.

William George Torr (1853–1939) married Charlotte Chewings (2 January 1854 – 10 August 1885) on 30 March 1877. Their children included:

- Leonie May Torr (16 September 1883 – 20 February 1944) married William R. Christie (c.1863 – c. 1940) on 16 July 1904
- Claude Montrose Torr (2 May 1885 – 1917)

He married again, to Albertina Santo (née Kidner) (c. 1845 – 10 December 1909) on 20 December 1893.

Albertina was the widow of Philip Santo, Jnr (11 December 1842 – 13 June 1868); they had two daughters, Albertina Mary Santo (1867– ) and Amelia Elizabeth Santo (1868–1941), who both married Messent boys.

He married a third time, to Mary Frances Buchan, née Walter, (c. 1856 – 17 March 1937) on 6 February 1912.

Mary was the widow of auctioneer David Thomas Buchan (1840–1891) of Melbourne, who had a son, Allan Carnegy Buchan.

The Torrs lived at Way Cottage, Great Downing Street (became Wattle Avenue), Brighton.
