= Henry Furneaux Peacock =

South Australian public servant

Henry Furneaux Peacock (25 October 1850 – 6 February 1935) was a South Australian public servant, who served as Under-Treasurer of S.A.

== History ==
Peacock was born in Adelaide to Wiles Peacock, a conveyancer, winegrower and distiller of Fullarton and his wife Jane Peacock, née Furneaux, who arrived in South Australia aboard Taglioni in October 1842 with two daughters.

He was educated at the Fellenberg Commercial School on Hindmarsh Square, and at J. L. Young's Adelaide Educational Institution. He joined the SA Public Service as a cadet in the Chief secretary's office at the age of 15. He left the public service in 1872 for an appointment with the Bank of South Australia, then joined the Education Department five years later. The following year he won a position with Treasury and was appointed Controller of Accounts on 1 July 1906.

He served during sixteen changes of Treasurer, holding various duties including Registrar of Stock, Controller of Imperial Pensions, and secretary of the Public Service Provident Fund. His final promotion was as successor to Tom Gill as Under-Treasurer in 1920, retiring in 1923. His successor was the Public Actuary, Reginald Robert Stuckey.

== Other interests ==
- Peacock was a keen gardener and was secretary/treasurer of the S.A. Gardeners' Society for over 25 years.
- In his youth he was a fine athlete, a member of the Adelaide Amateur Athletic Club, pre-eminent in the pole vault (then called "pole-leaping").
- He played cricket and lacrosse, and served President and Vice-President of various clubs.

== Family ==
Wiles Peacock (c. 1817 – 28 April 1889), conveyancer, also winegrower and distiller of Furneaux vineyard, Fullarton, and his wife Jane Peacock, née Furneaux (c. 1815 – 13 February 1892), who arrived in South Australia aboard Taglioni in October 1842 with two daughters.

- Jane Peacock (c. 1840 – 1 October 1919) married Stephen Gale ( – ) on 13 May 1862
- Hannah Peacock (c. March 1842 – 24 August 1928) married Joseph Stear Carlyon Cole ( –1916) of Stanley Grammar School, Watervale, fame, on 29 November 1862.
- Sarah Deborah Peacock (1844– ) possibly died in infancy
- Henry Furneaux Peacock (1850 – 6 February 1935) married Adelaide Mary Allott (1856–1944), daughter of mayor W. D. Allott, in 1879.

- Lurline Allott Peacock (1880–1971)
- Leslie Wiles Allott Peacock (1882–1960) married Ida Caroline Mary Holden (20 July 1888 – 1976), daughter of H. J. Holden, on 21 April 1909. He was a councillor with the Berri Town Council.
- Doris Allott Peacock (1888–1985) married Laurance Llewellyn Davey in 1915

- Emily Peacock (c. 1853 – 25 August 1930) married James Crocker (c. 1846 – 6 June 1920) in 1875
- Rebecca Peacock (1855 – 20 March 1912) married William John Simons/Simonds? Coote ( – 8 October 1913) on 8 June 1896

There is no reason to believe they were related to businessman and parliamentarian William Peacock.
