= William Jethro Brown =

Australian jurist (1868–1930)

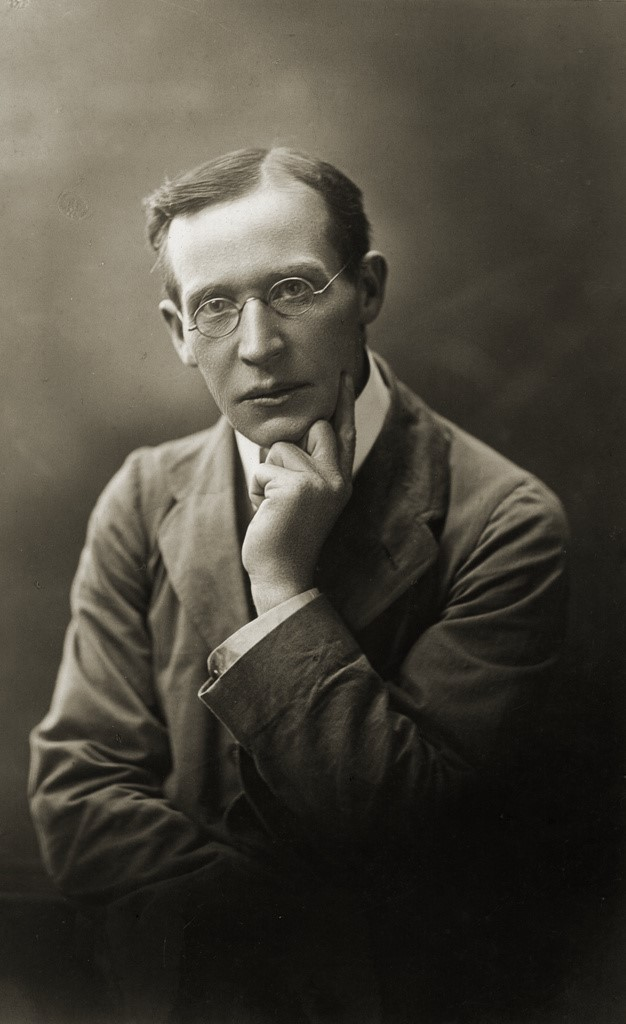

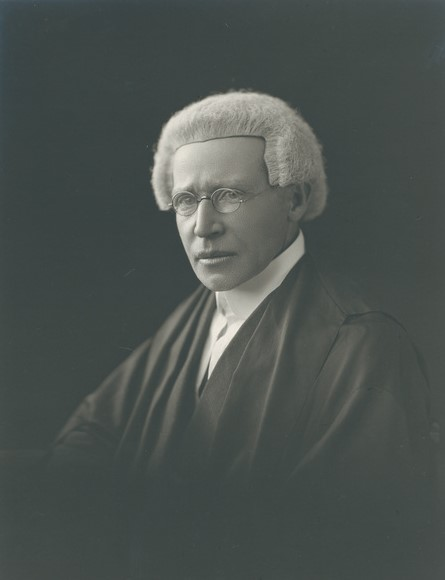

William Jethro Brown (29 March 1868 – 27 May 1930), commonly referred to as Jethro Brown, was an Australian jurist and Professor of Law.

Brown was the son of James Brown, a farmer, and his wife Sophia Jane, née Torr, so "Old Oxford" W. G. Torr was an uncle. He was born at Mintaro, South Australia and educated at Stanley Grammar School, Watervale, South Australia, then taught for a while at Moonta Mines State School. He then studied at St John's College, Cambridge, graduating in 1890 with a double first class in the law tripos. He was called to the bar of the Middle Temple in 1891.

His replacement was Coleman Phillipson (1875/1878?–1958), who occupied the chair from 1919 to 1925.
