= Auburn, South Australia =

Auburn
- Town
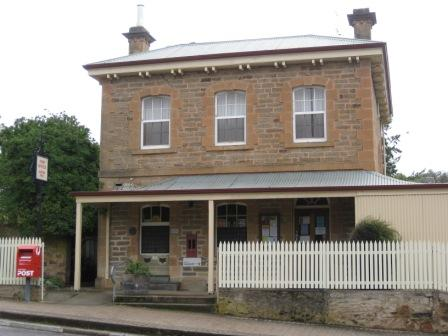
- Auburn Post Office

- Coordinates: 34°01′38″S 138°41′08″E
- Country: Australia
- State: South Australia
- Region: Mid North
- LGA: District Council of Clare and Gilbert Valleys
- Location: 111 km (69 mi) north of Adelaide; 25 km (16 mi) south of Clare
- Established: 1849

Government
  - Mayor: Allan Aughey
  - State electorate: Frome
  - Federal division: Grey

Population
  - Total: 370 (UCL 2021)
- Postcode: 5451
Localities around Auburn
Watervale	Leasingham	Mintaro
Hoyleton	Auburn	Manoora
Halbury	Undalya	Saddleworth

Auburn is a small town in the southern edge of the Clare Valley, in the Mid North of South Australia.

It lies in the northern Mount Lofty Ranges just east of the Skilly Hills. Auburn is bisected by the Wakefield River as it makes its way to the sea at Port Wakefield.

It has strong poetical themes, being named from a poem and the birthplace of a famed poet.

== History ==
The first European to explore through the Auburn district, in April 1839, was John Hill, who was followed one month later by Edward John Eyre. On 10 March 1840 John Morphett selected a special survey of 4,000 acres on the Wakefield River as land agent for three English investors, Admiral George Lambert, Edward Rice M.P., and Robert Slaney M.P.

Very soon after, just outside the southwest corner of this survey, a pioneering character named William Tateham squatted on the Wakefield River, living in a riverbank dugout from where he provided hospitality to travellers. The spot, which later became the site of Auburn, was for a time named Tateham's Waterhole or Billy Tatum's because of this.

In October 1849, Thomas Henry Williams, a copper-smelting superintendent at the Burra mines, received a land grant for what was to become the Auburn area. During the next few years Williams sold off allotments to bullock teamsters and others. The first building – a well-appointed hotel named the Rising Sun Inn, which still stands – was built in 1850 and so Auburn Village was begun. The hotel's enterprising proprietor, Joseph Edwin Bleechmore (c. 1809–1887), also founded the town's school, which opened in May 1855 under Joseph S. Cole, later of Stanley Grammar School.

The Spalding railway line from Riverton opened on 5 July 1918. The railway was closed and removed in the 1980s and is now the Rattler trail.

The name of Auburn, probably applied by Williams, is doubtless derived from a line in a poem by Oliver Goldsmith, Sweet Auburn, loveliest village on the plain.

== Governance ==
Auburn is in the District Council of Clare and Gilbert Valleys, the state electoral district of Frome, and the Australian House of Representatives Division of Grey.

== Notable residents ==
Auburn is the birthplace of Australian poet, C. J. Dennis (born 1876), who lived for a time in the former Auburn Hotel, which has since been demolished. A small tributary of the Wakefield River, Dennis Creek runs through the town and was named in honour of his father, who was a local publican 1868–80. The town was also the birthplace of Australian cricketer and Australian Rules football player, Ernie Jones (born 1869). Mary "Maisie" Harriet Archer Thomas nee Smith, wife of South Australian newspaper proprietor Evan Kyffin Thomas and daughter of the local doctor, Arthur William Smith was born at Auburn on 8 October 1878.

== The town today ==
Often considered the Gateway to the Clare Valley, the town is on the Horrocks Highway, approximately 111 kilometres from the state's capital, Adelaide and 25 kilometres south of the town of Clare.

Auburn always was a transport hub. In the 1850s it was on the Gulf Road, used by bullock teamsters carting copper ore from Burra, through Mintaro, to Hoyles Plains and on to Port Wakefield. Today it is on the Horrocks Highway, connecting Adelaide to the north, and also connects the Riverland district with Yorke Peninsula. The southern end of the Riesling Trail also begins here, alongside the former railway station, which is now a winery cellar door.

Auburn has many charming historical buildings. As a result, since the 1970s the town has become a popular tourist destination, with a number of local winery cellar doors and B&Bs. Auburn is serviced by a pub and several cafes, a gallery, roadhouse, bike hire and internet cafe, a post office, hairdresser, Primary School, CFS station, and a number of other services. The Auburn oval hosts sporting facilities for cricket, bowls and netball and is also the location of a small, self-contained caravan park.

== Gallery ==
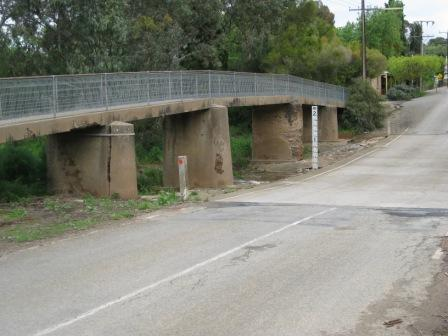
Ford and footbridge, King Street

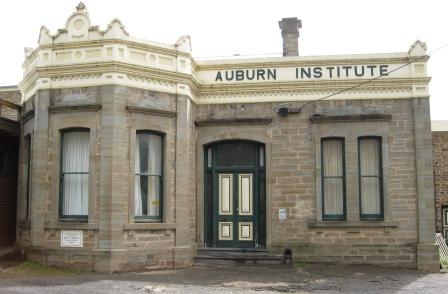
Institute building

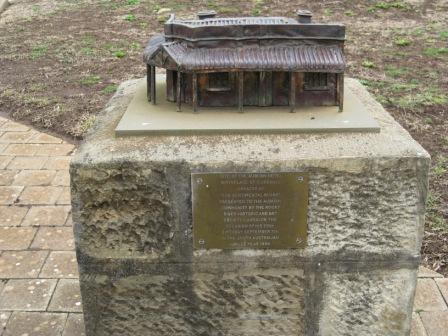
C. J. Dennis memorial

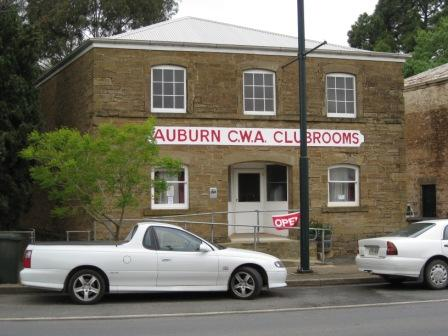
CWA Clubrooms, Main North Road

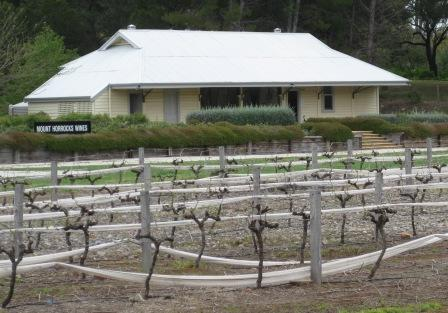
Former railway station, now a cellar door

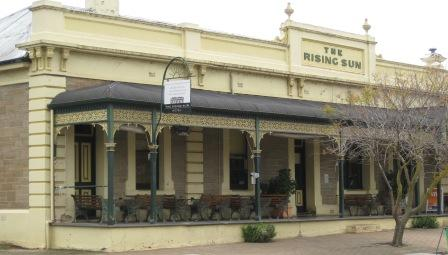
Rising Sun Hotel

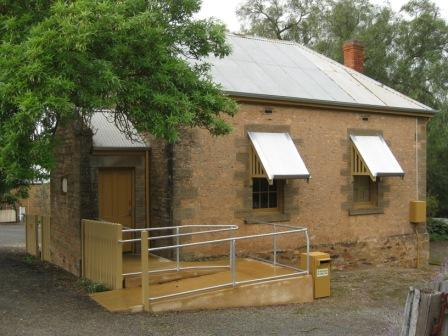
Public library (former Council Chambers)

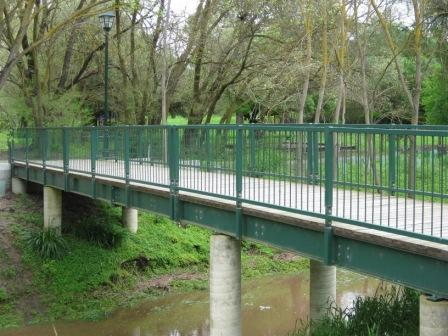
Footbridge over Wakefield River (part of the Riesling Trail)

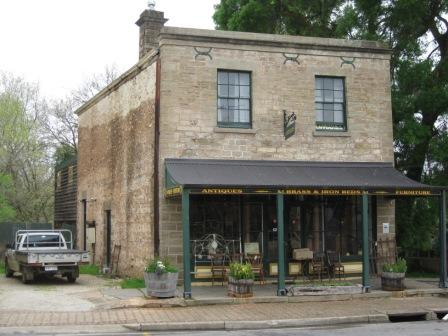
Former Mechanics Institute building, now an antique store
