= Hoyleton Airbase =

- IATA: none; ICAO: YHYL

Summary
- Airport type: Private
- Owner/Operator: Aerotech
- Location: Hoyleton, South Australia
- Time zone: Australian Central Standard Time (UTC+09:30)
  - Summer (DST): Australian Central Summer Time (UTC+10:30)
- Elevation AMSL: 160 m / 525 ft
- Coordinates: 34°01′32″S 138°31′29″E

Maps
- Interactive map of Hoyleton Airbase

Hoyleton Airbase (ICAO: YHYL) is an airstrip near the small town of Hoyleton in the Mid North region of South Australia. It has one unsealed runway. It is used as a support base for the South Australian Country Fire Service with several fixed wing aircraft (mostly Air Tractor AT-802s) and helicopters based there during the fire season.

The base is operated by Aerotech. Out of fire season, the aircraft are used for aerial crop spraying. In fire season, on high fire danger days, Hoyleton Airbase is on standby for rapid response to any reported fire in the Mid North Primary Response Zone. Sometimes the aircraft might reach a newly reported fire before CFS trucks are able to reach it.
