= Tom Gill (public servant) =

Australian public servant

Thomas Gill (23 February 1849 – 21 July 1923) CMG ISO was a public servant in South Australia who served as Under-Treasurer from 1894 to 1920.

== History ==
Gill was born in Glen Osmond the son of Thomas Gill (March 1816 – 1 January 1903) and Maria Florence Gill ( – 1910) née Selby, and educated at the local school.

Gill's father arrived in Albany, Western Australia aboard HMS Buffalo on 13 September 1833 in company with Sir Richard Spencer, for whom he served for three years before being involved in the construction of the coastal trader Emma Sherratt at Torbay. He was engaged with he W.A. Survey Department 1839–1844 then with the South Australian Government supervising construction of the Great Eastern Road between Glen Osmond and Crafers. He married Maria Florence Selby in 1848, and had three children: Tom, Mary Ann (1851– ), who married William Holmes on 28 December 1876, and George (1855– ) who moved to South Yarra, Victoria.

In 1865 he joined the Public Service as a junior in the Volunteer Staff (the colony's militia) office. He transferred to the Audit Office, where in 1877 he became chief clerk. In 1878 he was appointed to the Agent-General's Office, London, where he uncovered some valuable information regarding the way interest on the public debt of the colony was paid, resulting in significant savings. In 1881 he transferred to the Treasury; in June 1889 he was appointed Accountant to the Treasury.

He served as secretary to the South Australian delegates to the 1891 Federal Convention, and in 1894 was appointed Under-Treasurer of South Australia, welcomed by the press as a "... smart, reliable, and most deserving public officer", and faithfully served under eight (or nine if V. L. Solomon is counted) Treasurers of various political hues.

He retired in 1920; his replacement was Henry Furneaux Peacock.

Gill and Peter Whitington were in 1922 appointed as a commission to enquire into the public service to identify savings and means of simplifying and improving procedures.

He died in the Adelaide Hospital after being struck by a tram at the corner of Currie and King William streets.

== Treasurers for whom he served ==
- Thomas Playford II (11 June 1887 – 27 June 1889, 19 August 1890 – 6 January 1892, 16 June 1893 – 17 April 1894),
- Frederick Holder (27 June 1889 – 19 August 1890, 21 June 1892 – 15 October 1892, 17 April 1894 – 1 December 1899, 8 December 1899 – 15 May 1901)
- William Benjamin Rounsevell (6 January 1892 – 21 June 1892, 15 October 1892 – 12 May 1893)
- John Downer (12 May 1893 – 16 June 1893)
- Vaiben Louis Solomon (1 December 1899 – 8 December 1899)
- Richard Butler (15 May 1901 – 26 July 1905, 22 December 1909 – 3 Jun 1910, 14 July 1917 – 7 May 1919)
- Archibald Peake (26 July 1905 – 22 December 1909, 17 February 1912 – 3 April 1915, 15 May 1919 – 6 April 1920)
- Crawford Vaughan (3 June 1910 – 17 February 1912, 3 April 1915 – 14 July 1917)
- George Ritchie (8 April 1920 – 3 November 1922)

See Treasurer of South Australia

== Other interests ==
In 1886 he published a work on the bibliography of South Australia, and another on the Northern Territory in 1902. His large personal library featured an extensive collection of works on the early history of the Colony. He compiled and published a Bibliography of South Australia in 1886, a History and Topography of Glen Osmond in 1902, and a biography of Colonel William Light in 1911.

He was a foundation member and longtime treasurer of the South Australian branch of the Royal Geographical Society.

He was a trustee of the Savings Bank of South Australia from 1920, succeeding H. Allerdale Grainger.

He was a member of the Municipal Tramways Trust.

He was an executive officer of the Public Service Superannuation Fund Board to 1920.

== Family ==
He married Louisa Jane Bristow (c. 1857 – 18 September 1915) on 5 October 1874. They had a home "Willalar" in Glen Osmond. Their children were:

- Kathleen Mabel Gill (1877 – 29 August 1935)
- Thomas Flinders Gill (1884 – 16 December 1947) worked as gardener, died after being struck by car on Franklin Street, Adelaide.
- Elinor Aileen Gill (1884–1949) married John Gilbert Partridge on 22 April 1913, became the Australian and NZ representative of the Panacea Society
- Mary Gill (1886– )
- Adelaide Dorothy Gill (1889–1948) married Reginald Lewsbe Abbott on 21 November 1911. She married again, to Harry Lee Aldersey in 1926
- Franklin Gill (1891–1965) was a fine tenor and served as (Anglican) Synod secretary from 1938. He was also Hon. Treasurer of the Royal Geographical Society.

Walter Gill FLS (1851–1929), forestry administrator, for many years at Wirrabara, South Australia, has been described as a brother. This is contradicted by what is known of their respective parents and their birthplaces.
