= Skilly Hills =

Range of hills in South Australia

Coordinates: 33°58′S 138°36′E

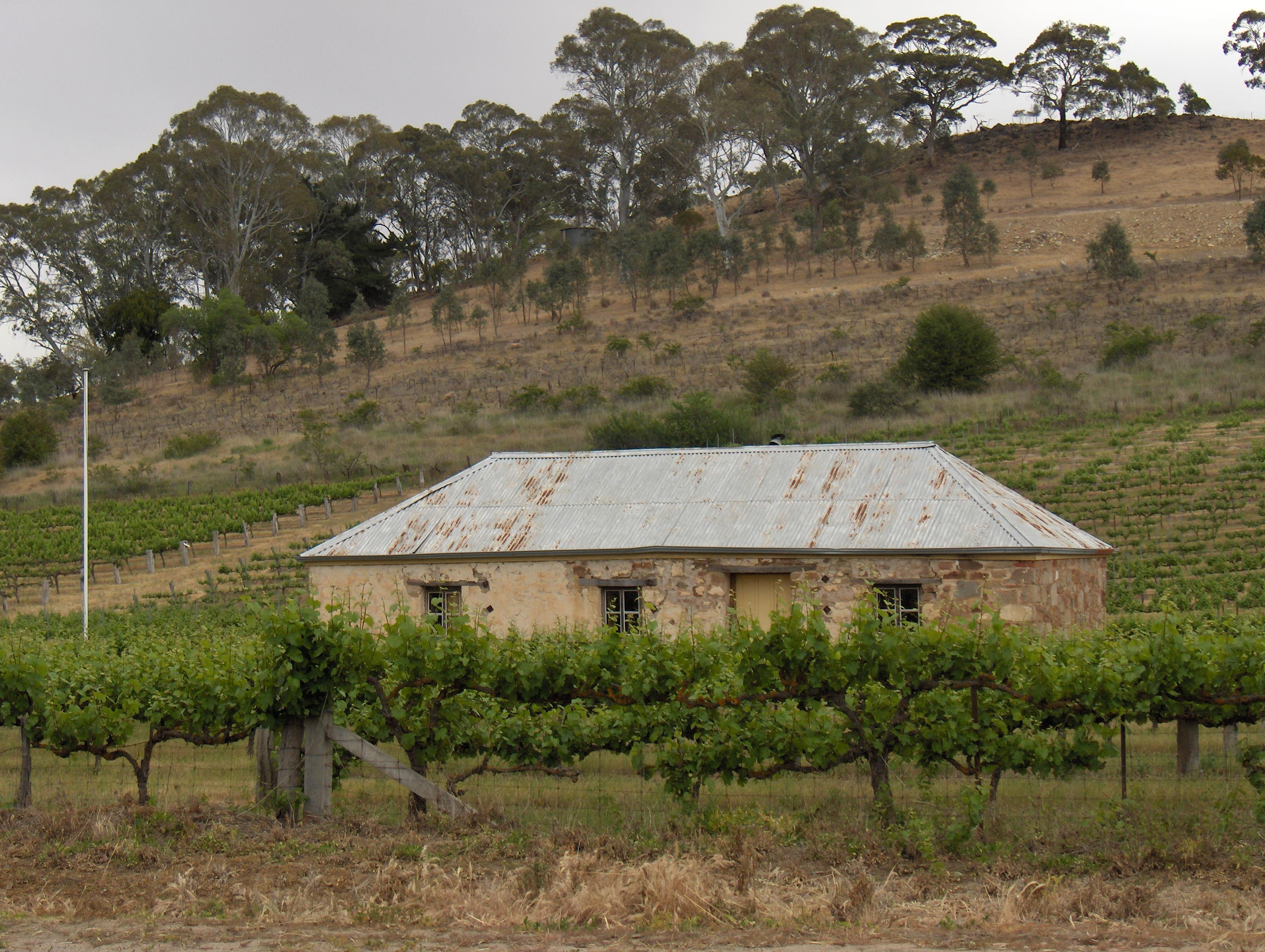
Section of the Skilly Hills on the western side of the Clare Valley town of Penwortham

The Skilly Hills are a range of hills which make up part of the Mount Lofty Ranges in South Australia's Mid North region.

They comprise several long parallel ridges of low hills which run generally north south, parallel to the Horrocks Highway, forming part of the western geographical boundary of the Clare Valley. For government administration, they are in the Hundred of Upper Wakefield, County of Stanley.

The most prominent peaks are Tower Hill and Mount Oakden, the latter being named after local pioneer John Oakden.

== History ==
The name Skilly Hills is a slang derivation from nearby Skillogalee Creek, a watercourse that rises near Penwortham and flows southward, generally parallel to the Skilly Hills, to become a tributary of the Wakefield River. The creek itself was named by a government survey party of 1840 (perhaps with a certain irony concerning their rations) after skillogalee (usually spelt skillygalee), a traditional thin broth, simple in composition, once typically consumed throughout the British Isles, especially in Ireland and Scotland, particularly by the working class, as well as by soldiers and seafarers.

By the 1860s the creek was often called Skilly Creek, there then being districts called Upper (later Higher) Skilly and Lower Skilly, with schools in each. Upper Skilly also became called the Skilly Hills, a name recorded in common usage by at least 1877. The high rainfall in the Skilly Hills contributes to the Skillogalee Creek being one of the few permanently flowing watercourses in the region.

== Land use ==
There are no towns of significance within the Skilly Hills but there are several towns and townships nearby which service the area, including Penwortham, Leasingham, Watervale, and Auburn. The town of Clare serves many of the commercial needs of the district. Land use is mainly mixed farming and sheep grazing. In recent decades wine and olive oil production have become important elements of local commerce. These attractions, plus the picturesque hills, support a tourism industry, resulting from which there are quite a few bed and breakfast establishments in the region.
