= Hoyleton, South Australia =

Hoyleton South Australia
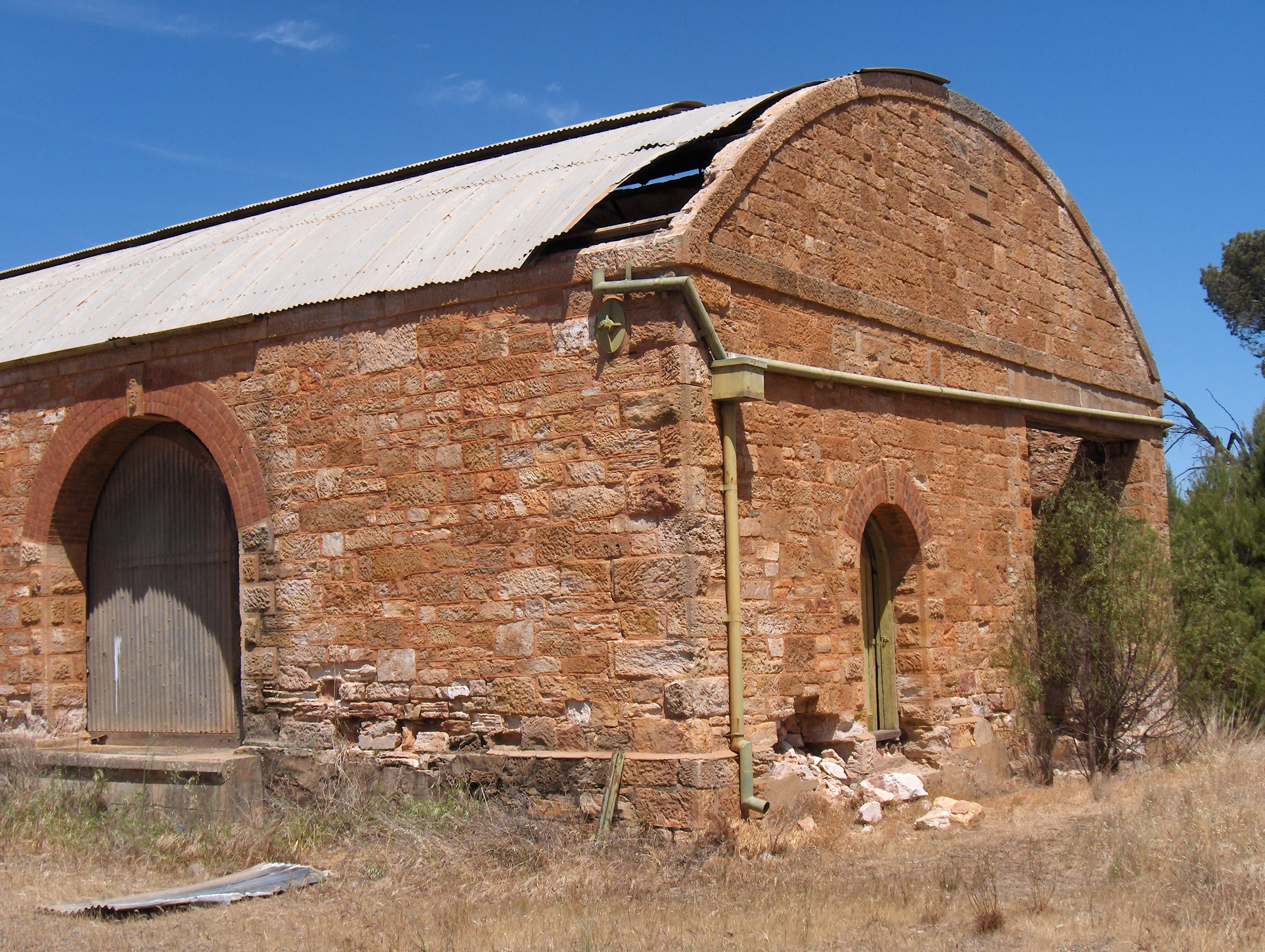
- Original goods shed, built in the 1870s

- Coordinates: 34°01′25″S 138°33′43″E
- Population: 120 (SAL 2021)
- LGA(s): Wakefield Regional Council
- Region: Mid North
- County: Stanley
- State electorate(s): Goyder
- Federal division(s): Grey
Localities around Hoyleton:
Bowillia	Kybunga; Spring Gully	Watervale
Stow	Hoyleton	Leasingham
Watchman	Halbury	Auburn

Hoyleton (formerly Hoyle's Plains) is a former railway town in South Australia, west of the Clare Valley, halfway between Leasingham and Halbury.

Hoyle's Plains was the original terminus of the Port Wakefield railway line. This was constructed in 1869 as a horse-drawn tramway to assist farmers on the newly settled Hoyles Plains to get their grain to the port.

The Gladstone railway line ran from Balaklava to Blyth and further on into the Mid North of the state. Due to various reasons, this particular line had become obsolete and the tracks were dismantled in the late 1980s. The original historic stone railway shed remains standing alongside the grain silos which are still in use, but now serviced by road.

Sir Walter Watson Hughes, one of the founders of the University of Adelaide, originally owned a pastoral lease at Hoyleton in the 1850s. He later went on to own vast copper mining interests at Wallaroo, on the Yorke Peninsula.

The Hoyleton Airbase to the west of the township is a base for firefighting aircraft to quickly respond to reports of fires in the Mid North region.

== Government ==
Hoyleton is in the Wakefield Regional Council local government area, the State Electoral District of Goyder and the Federal Electorate of Grey.

== Gallery ==
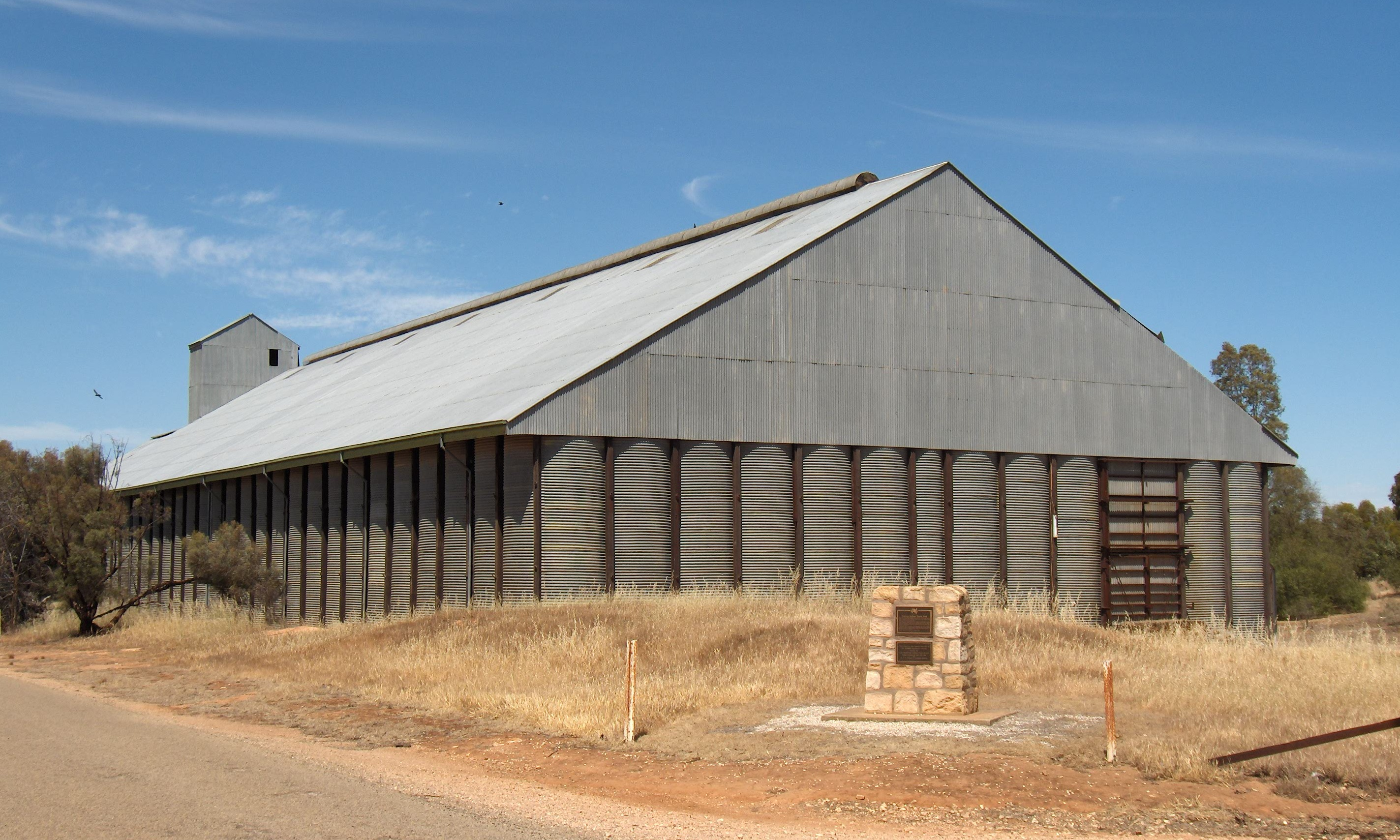
Grain storage that is no longer in use

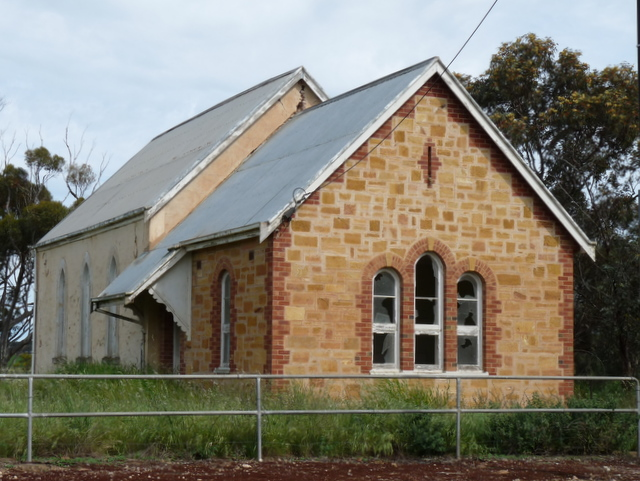
Disused church

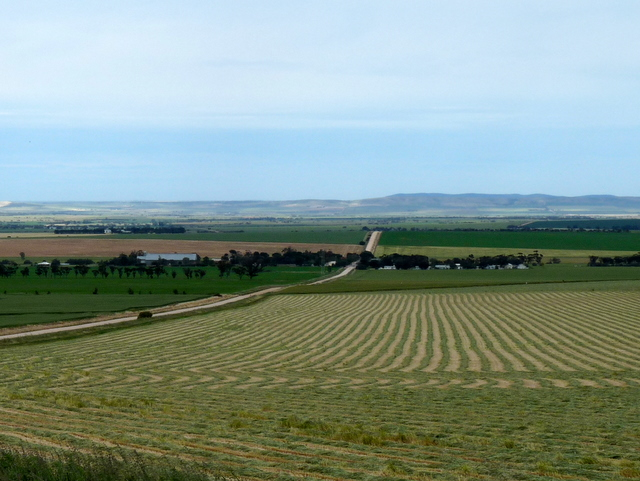
Looking west towards Hoyleton from Mt. George Road

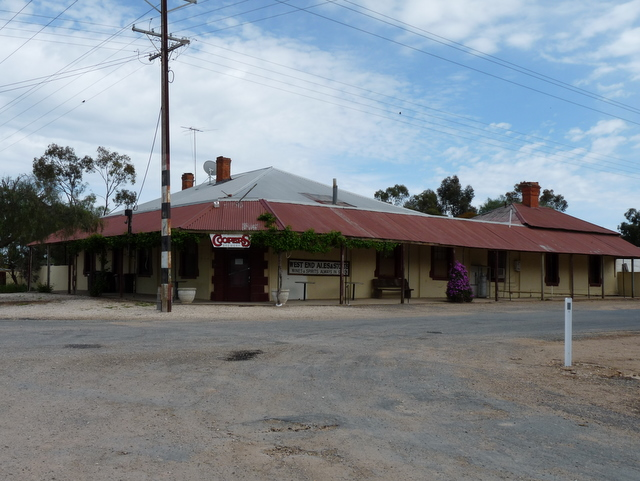
Former Hoyleton Hotel

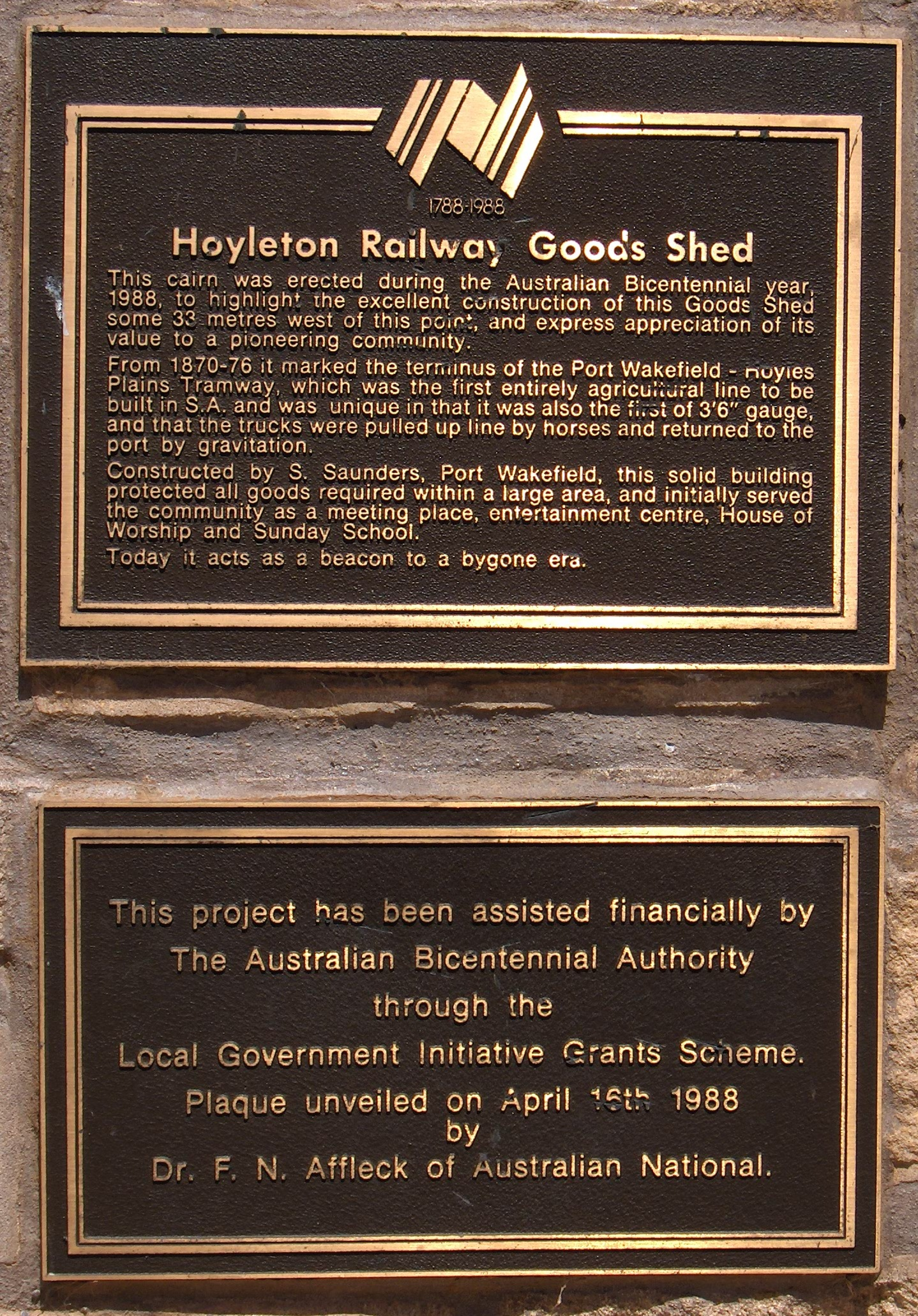
Railway monument
