= Walter Hughes Duncan =

Australian politician

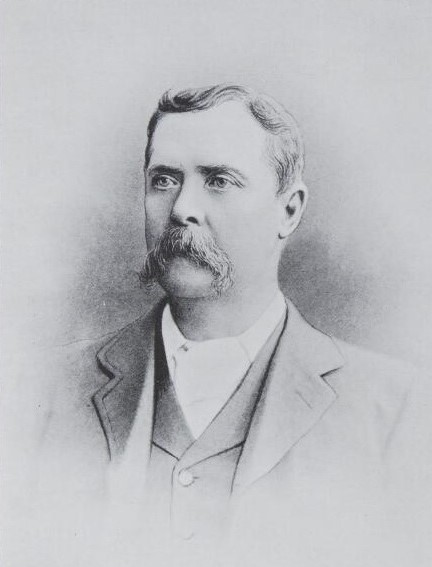

Walter Hughes Duncan (29 April 1848 – 12 May 1906) was a South Australian pastoralist and politician. He was a member of the South Australian House of Assembly from 1896 to 1906, representing the electorates of Onkaparinga (1896-1902) and Murray (1902-1906).

== History ==
Duncan was born the second son of (sea) Captain John Duncan (died 24 April 1880) in Anstruther, Fifeshire, Scotland, and came out to South Australia with his parents in 1854; his father was a partner with his brother-in-law Sir Walter W. Hughes, who was running sheep and cattle at Hoyle's Plains and on Yorke Peninsula in the vicinity of Wallaroo and Moonta. He was educated at Stanley Grammar School, at Watervale, at St Peter's College, Adelaide, and studied for two years at Cambridge. He was a successful pastoralist, owning "Mernowie" of 1,800 acres (730 ha) near Marrabel and shareholder in the Wallaroo and Moonta mines.

== Politics ==
He was a councillor with Waterloo District Council for three years, then stood, unsuccessfully, for the Assembly seat of Burra in 1891, and again in 1893. In 1896 he stood for Onkaparinga and was successful, and was returned in 1899, both times with Robert Caldwell as a colleague. In 1902 he won the seat of Murray. He was an attentive listener, and only ever spoke in Parliament on matters with which he was completely conversant. He was "one of Nature's gentlemen".

He died suddenly at sea on the S.S. Ormuz on his return journey from London, somewhere between Port Said and Colombo, and was buried at sea.

== Family ==
He was a nephew of Sir Walter Watson Hughes and a brother of the politician Sir John James Duncan. He had a half-brother William Duncan and half-sisters Janet Elizabeth Duncan and Helen Chambers Duncan.

He married Alice Rebecca Good ( – ca.30 October 1927) on 21 September 1876; they had residences "Duncraig" at Stirling and "St Monans" at Palmer Place (Brougham Place?), North Adelaide.
