= Wakefield River =

Wakefield
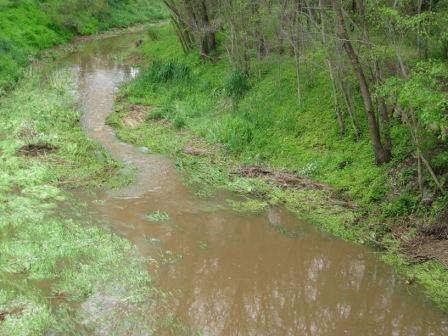
- Wakefield River flowing through Auburn

- Location of the river mouth in South Australia
- Etymology: Edward Gibbon Wakefield
- Native name: Undalya (Kaurna)

Location
- Country: Australia
- State: South Australia
- Region: Mid North, Adelaide Plains

Physical characteristics
- Source: Clare Valley
  - location: Black Springs
  - coordinates: 33°56′9″S 138°51′46″E
  - elevation: 429 m (1,407 ft)
- Mouth: Gulf St Vincent
  - location: Port Wakefield
  - coordinates: 34°11′24″S 138°08′38″E
  - elevation: 0 m (0 ft)
- Length: 116 km (72 mi)
- Basin size: 1,913 km^{2} (739 sq mi)

Basin features
- Tributaries
  - left: Pine Creek (Wakefield River)|Pine Creek, Woolshed Flat Creek
  - right: Skillogalee Creek

The Wakefield River is an ephemeral river that flows to an estuary in the Australian state of South Australia.

== Course and features ==
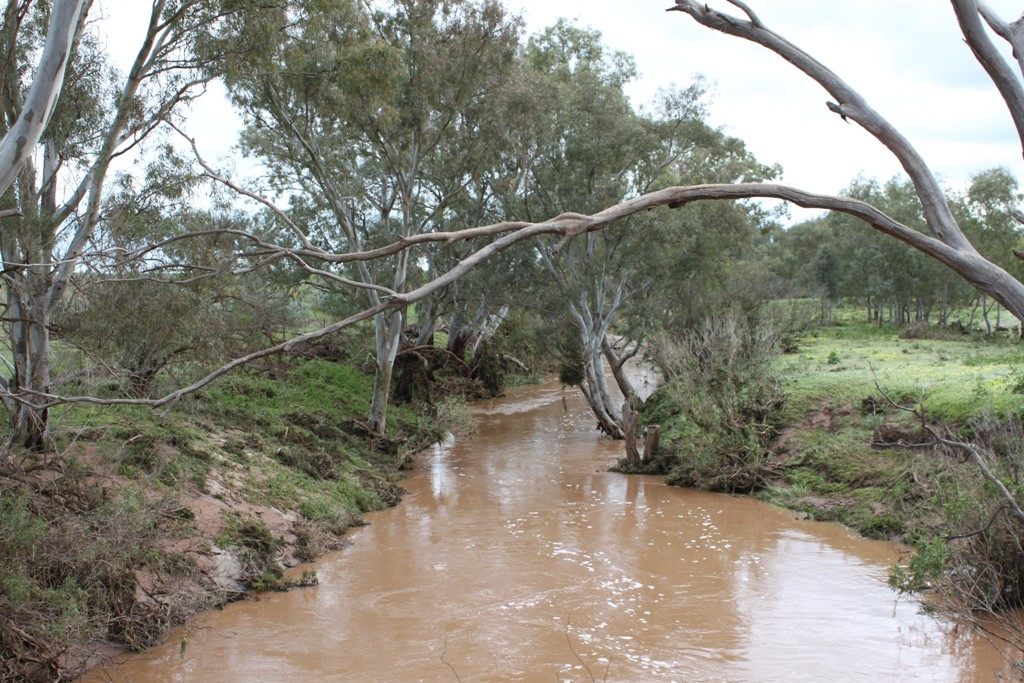
Wakefield River in flood at Whitwarta in 2010

The river rises above Merildin, flowing southward, passing the towns of Watervale and Auburn, where it is fed by several small creeks, and then curves to flow westerly past the town of Balaklava into the head of Gulf St Vincent at Port Wakefield.

The river's catchment area covers 1,913 square kilometres (739 sq mi). Three quarters of the catchment is used for agricultural purposes.

The major tributaries of the Wakefield River are the Eyre, Skillogalee, Pine, Rices, Hermitage and Woolshed Flat Creeks. Skillogalee Creek, which rises in the Skilly Hills near Penwortham, is a significant tributary of the Wakefield River. The high rainfall in the Skilly Hills contributes to the Skillogalee Creek being one of the few permanently flowing watercourses in the region.

Dennis Creek is another tributary of the Wakefield River. It is a very short ephemeral stream which is located in the Clare Valley town of Auburn and only flows during periods of rain. Its headwaters are located in the hills on the western side of the town and it runs along a small gully, passing under Main North Road, and into the Wakefield River. The creek was named after James Dennis, the father of C.J. Dennis, who ran a hotel in the town for a time.

Course of the river

== History ==
The first recorded sighting of the river was from John Hill (incorrectly named William Hill by some sources) in early April 1839, who named it after Edward Gibbon Wakefield, the promoter of the scheme of systematic colonization that led to the founding of the Colony of South Australia. Hill was embarked upon the expedition which led to his discovery of the Clare Valley. The second European to visit was explorer Edward John Eyre, in late May 1839, who records that he encamped "upon a chain of large ponds of excellent water called by Mr. Hill the Wakefield".

== See also ==
- List of rivers of Australia § South Australia
