= Stanley Grammar School =

Location
- Watervale SA
- Coordinates: 33.96096°S 138.64410°E

Stanley Grammar School was a private day and boarding school in Watervale, a small town in South Australia's Clare Valley. Its history, which dates from 1858 to 1904, is inextricably linked with that of its founder and headmaster, Joseph S. Cole (1831–1916).

== History ==
The school began as "Watervale School" in mid-1858 with headmaster J. S. Cole and 59 boy students. It was first housed in the Bible Christian chapel in Watervale. The Council of Education had already authorised construction of a new publicly funded schoolhouse, which was opened on 17 February 1859.

Cole ran the school in two streams: a lower school, funded by the Council of Education (later Education Department), operating in their building and according to their curriculum, and the upper school, for which fees were charged and which was run independently.

At some stage, Cole purchased the land between the schoolhouse and Commercial Street, and in 1863 began construction of his private school building, with four rooms at the rear section of what would become the present-day two-storey structure. Anne Parker advertised "boarding for young gentlemen" in conjunction with Cole's school. It became "Stanley Grammar School" in 1867, Stanley being the county in which Watervale is situated, and later the motto Discat puer ut docere possit (Let the boy learn, that he may teach) was adopted by Cole. In 1871, the building was extended upward, with four dormitories on the upper floor. A new section was added at ground floor level with another two dormitories above. Demand for student accommodation continued to grow, and Cole received some criticism for the standard of accommodation and decided to divorce his operations from the Council of Education. In 1878 made an offer (which was rejected) to purchase its school building, as he was about to embark on further building.

In 1884, the building was greatly enlarged to something like its final form.

Although primarily a boys' school, there were occasional girl students, and possibly female boarders. Subjects offered included chemistry, assaying, surveying, linear and perspective drawing, brokerage discount and commission, bookkeeping, and field subjects. The school operated as a night school for some time.

Cole retired in 1904, when it appears the school closed, and he died in 1916. The building was left untouched by his two daughters for almost thirty years, then sold at auction. The building has operated as a restaurant and as a bed and breakfast accommodation. It has been placed on the South Australian Heritage Register and is now a classified, protected building.

There is little to be found on Cole's assistants, though he must have had several. A Mr Flett is mentioned, as is a Mrs Jordan, later Mrs F. W. Johnson, who opened her own private school in Watervale, then served as "house mother" at Stanley Grammar for five years. Mrs Cole, née Hannah Peacock (1842–1928) was described in obituaries as "invaluable" and "the real house mother", but memorialists, of which there were many, only ever mention J. S. Carlyon Cole. By contrast, the names (at least) of many tutors at the, admittedly somewhat larger, near-contemporary Adelaide Educational Institution are known. It is likely their daughter Jessie Cole, who lived on the property until her death in March 1949, was an assistant.

== Postscript ==
After Jessie's death, most of the contents were sold by public auction. The building passed through a number of hands, many with the idea of converting the old school into a private residence, before running up against the sad reality of the cost of such a project. Girl Guides have used its rooms, as has the school next door. Old wares and antiques and old farming equipment have been sold from the premises. In the early 1970s a group of artists purchased the property for $10,000 and used it as a studio for making jewellery and ceramics. One potential buyer wanted to demolish it for the building materials.

It was accorded State Heritage listing in 1978.

In the 1980s, it became a restaurant, "The Three Roses," which was popular for some time. It operated as a "Bed and Breakfast" in the early 1990s. Through all these changes of usage, the building continued to deteriorate, until an Adelaide heart surgeon purchased the property and with liberal doses of money and expertise restored and refurbished the building. He owned it for 14 years, then in 2007 sold it to Denise and Frank Kuss, who offered its various suites as luxury boutique accommodation.

== Notable alumni ==
Students of the institution who went on to some prominence include:

- Dr. W. Jethro Brown
- Sir John Duncan
- Walter Hughes Duncan, his brother
- Sir David Gordon
- David Shearer
- William George Torr
