= Watervale, South Australia =

Town in the Clare Valley, South Australia

Watervale
- Town
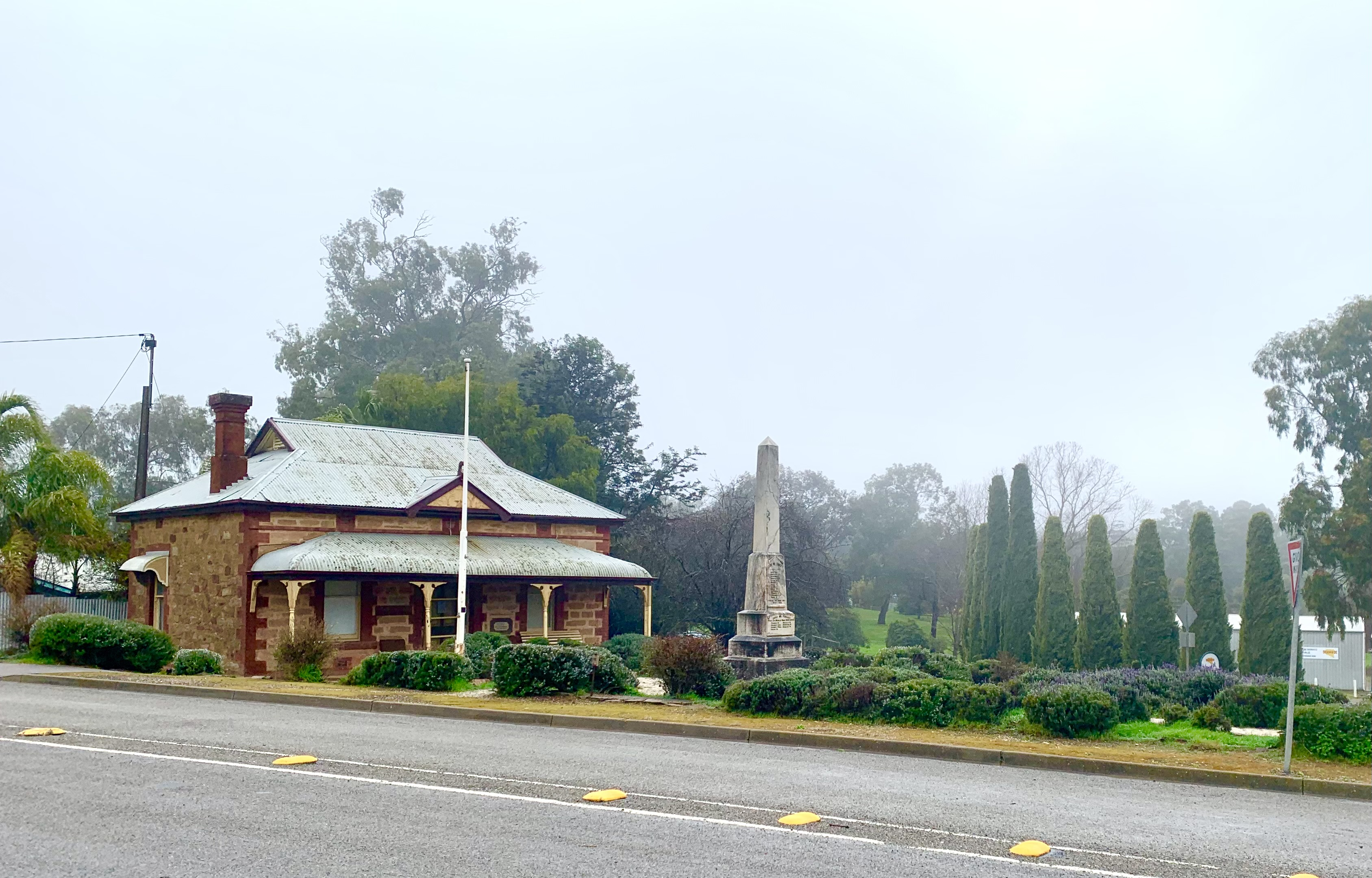
- The Institute and War Memorial in Watervale

- Coordinates: 33°57′0″S 138°38′0″E
- Country: Australia
- State: South Australia
- Region: Mid North
- LGA: District Council of Clare and Gilbert Valleys
- Location: 120 km (75 mi) north of Adelaide; 15 km (9.3 mi) south of Clare
- Established: 1847

Government
  - Mayor: Allan Aughey
  - State electorate: Frome
  - Federal division: Grey

Population
  - Total: 338 (SAL 2021)
- Postcode: 5452
Localities around Watervale
Spring Gully	Penwortham	Mintaro
Kybunga	Watervale	Manoora
Hoyleton	Leasingham	Auburn

Watervale is a town on the Horrocks Highway in the Clare Valley, South Australia, approximately 9 kilometres north of Auburn and 15 kilometres south of Clare. Watervale is located on the lands of the Ngadjuri people who remain the area's traditional and continuing custodians. It is surrounded by a number of small wineries and several B&Bs. The Riesling Trail runs past the town to the west, between the highway and the Skilly Hills.

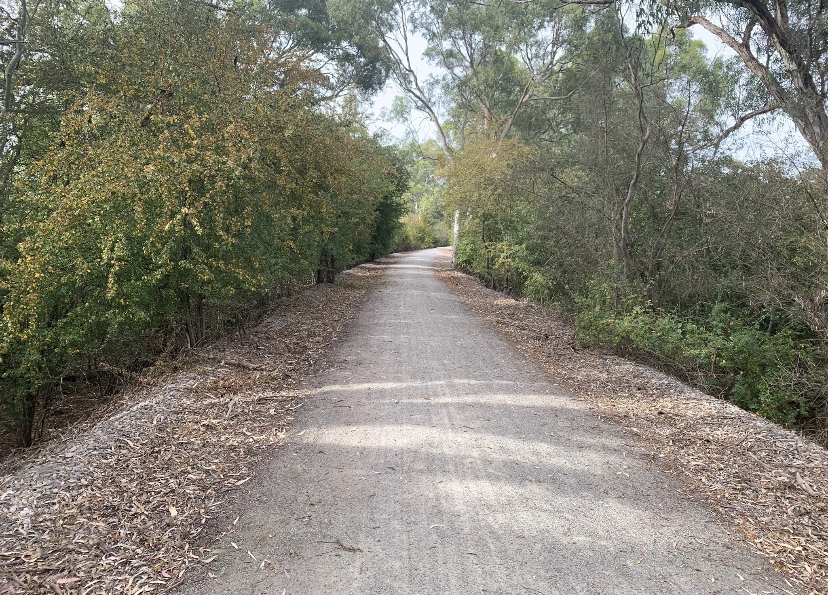
The Riesling Trail near Watervale township

The town has a number of 19th-century heritage buildings, including the former Stanley Grammar School, which now provides private bed and breakfast accommodation.

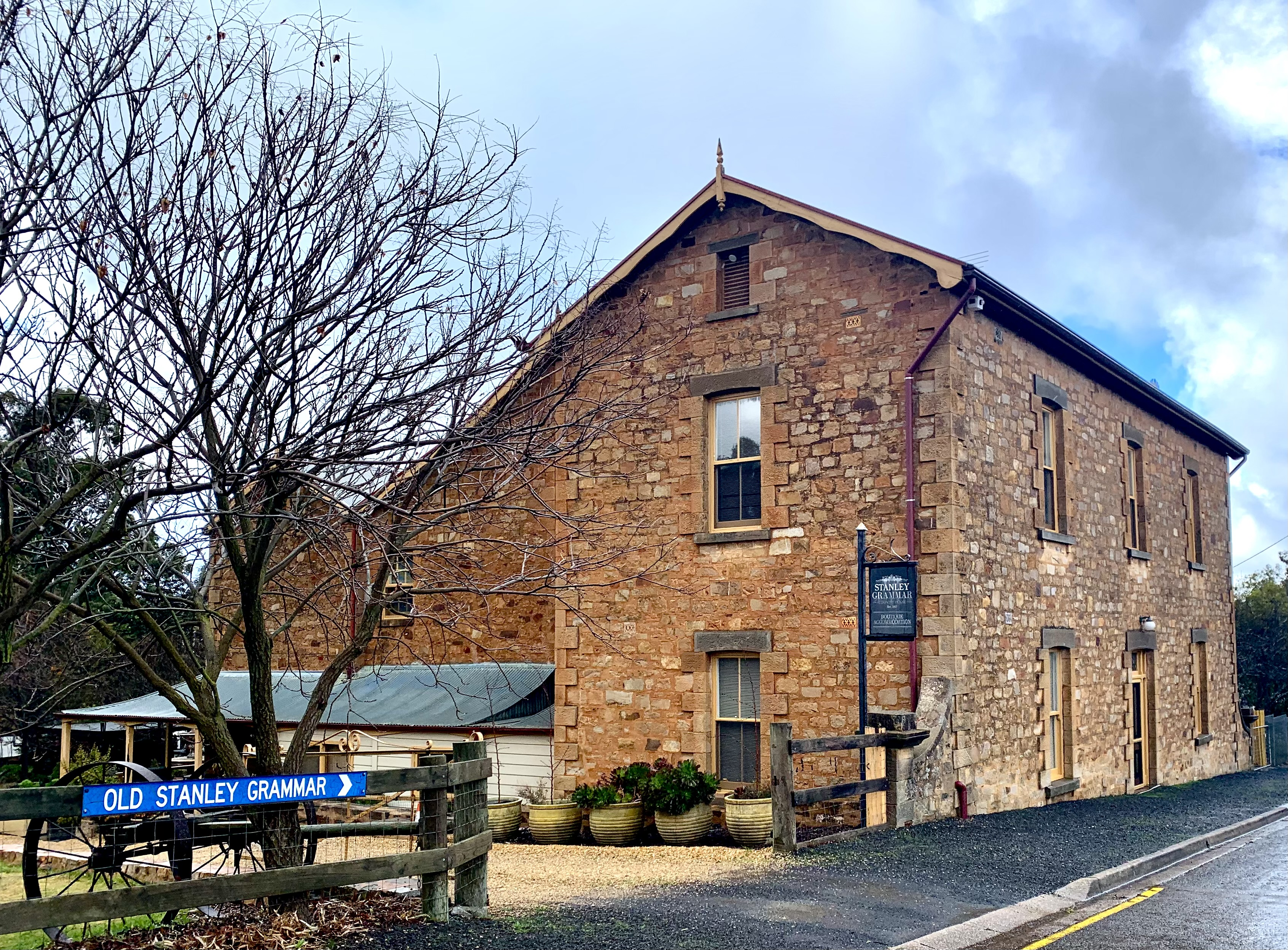
Old Stanley Grammar School

Mount Horrocks to the East is the highest point in the Clare Valley at 609 metres elevation and can be accessed via the Lavender Federation Trail. The walk from Watervale township to the top of Mt. Horrocks and back takes about 3 hours (at a distance of 11 km return) and is rated at a Grade 3 (moderate) difficulty. The spectacular views are 360° and are well worth the effort, particularly looking back at the township. https://www.walkingsa.org.au/walk/find-a-place-to-walk/collection/clare-valley-short-walks/

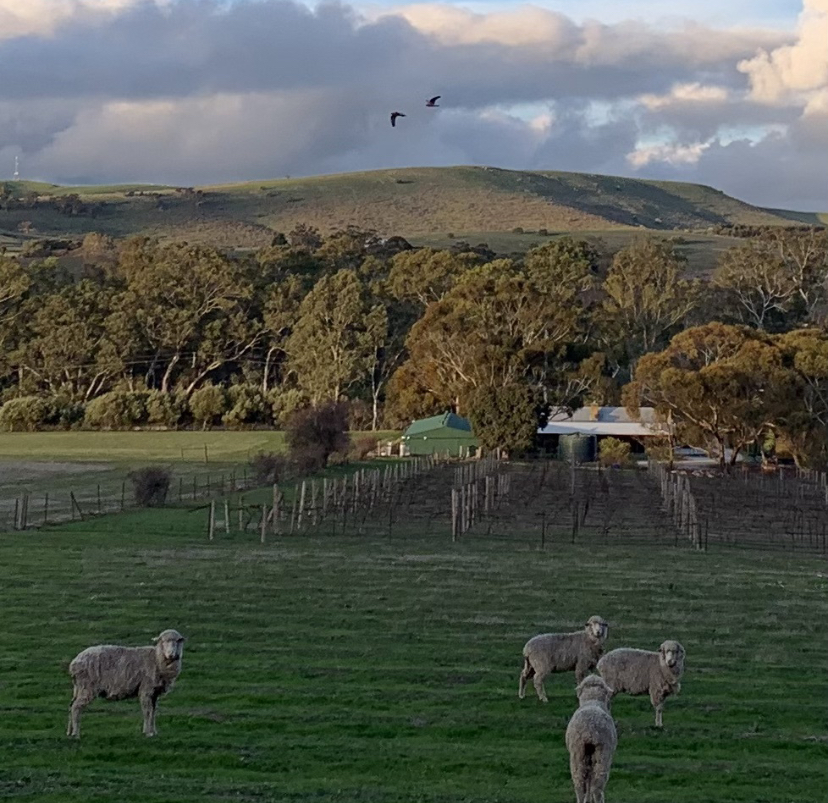
The view of Mt. Horrocks from the Riesling Trail near Watervale

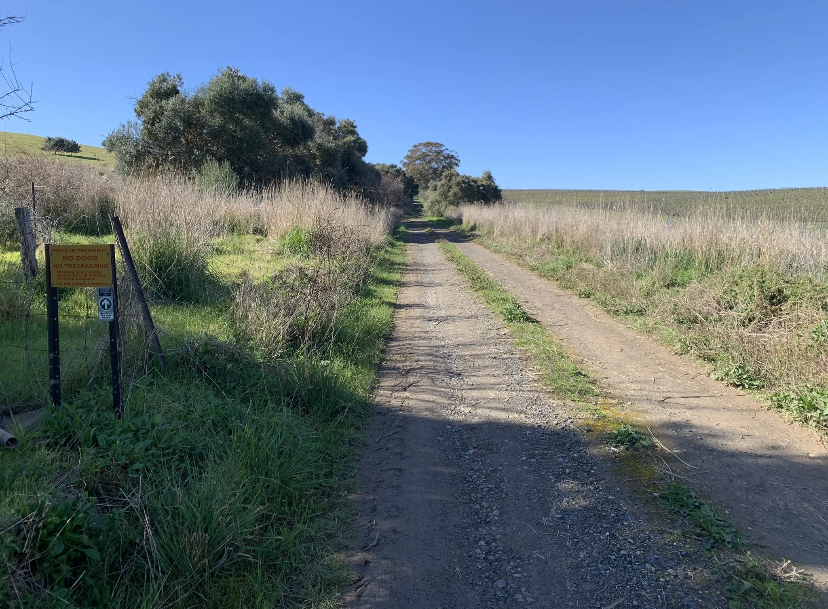
Part of the Lavender Federation Trail leading to Mt. Horrocks from Watervale township

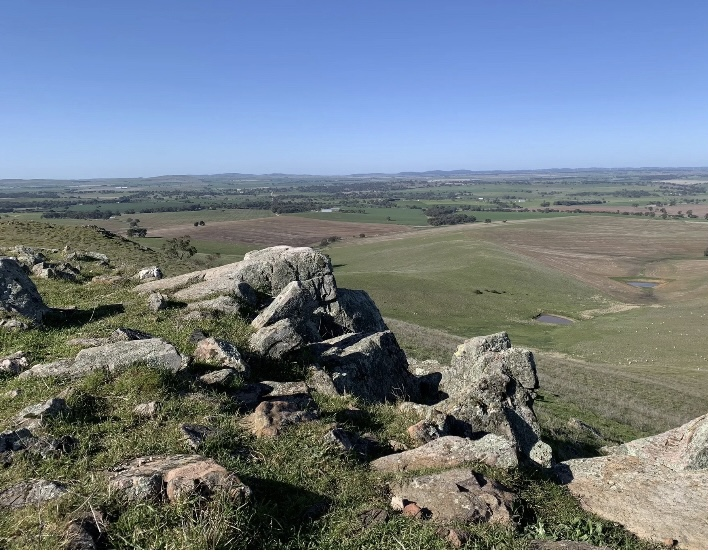
View of the surrounding countryside from the top of Mount Horrocks

== History ==
Watervale is located on Eyre Creek, which is a tributary of the Wakefield River.

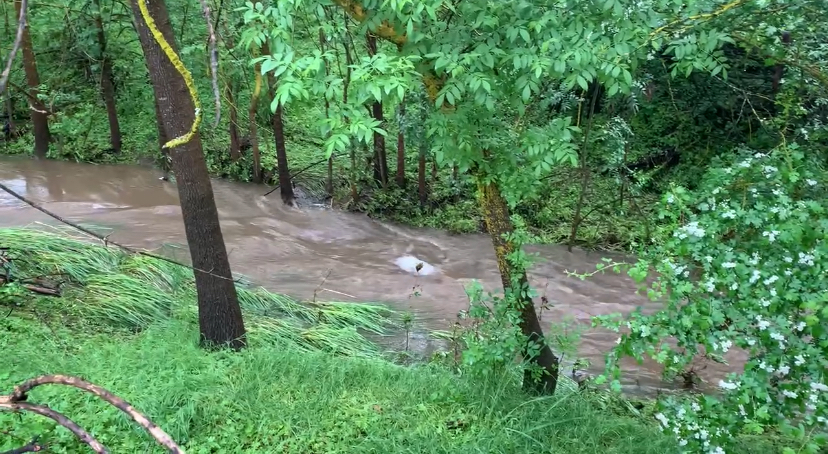
The Eyre Creek in Watervale

The area on which the town was settled was originally granted to a pioneer named David Davies in 1847 by Governor Robe, and he named this section of land Watervale.

The area was settled by a number of Protestant families who founded a Bible Methodist Church in the township. The current Uniting Church and accompanying hall are examples of such colonial constructions in the area.

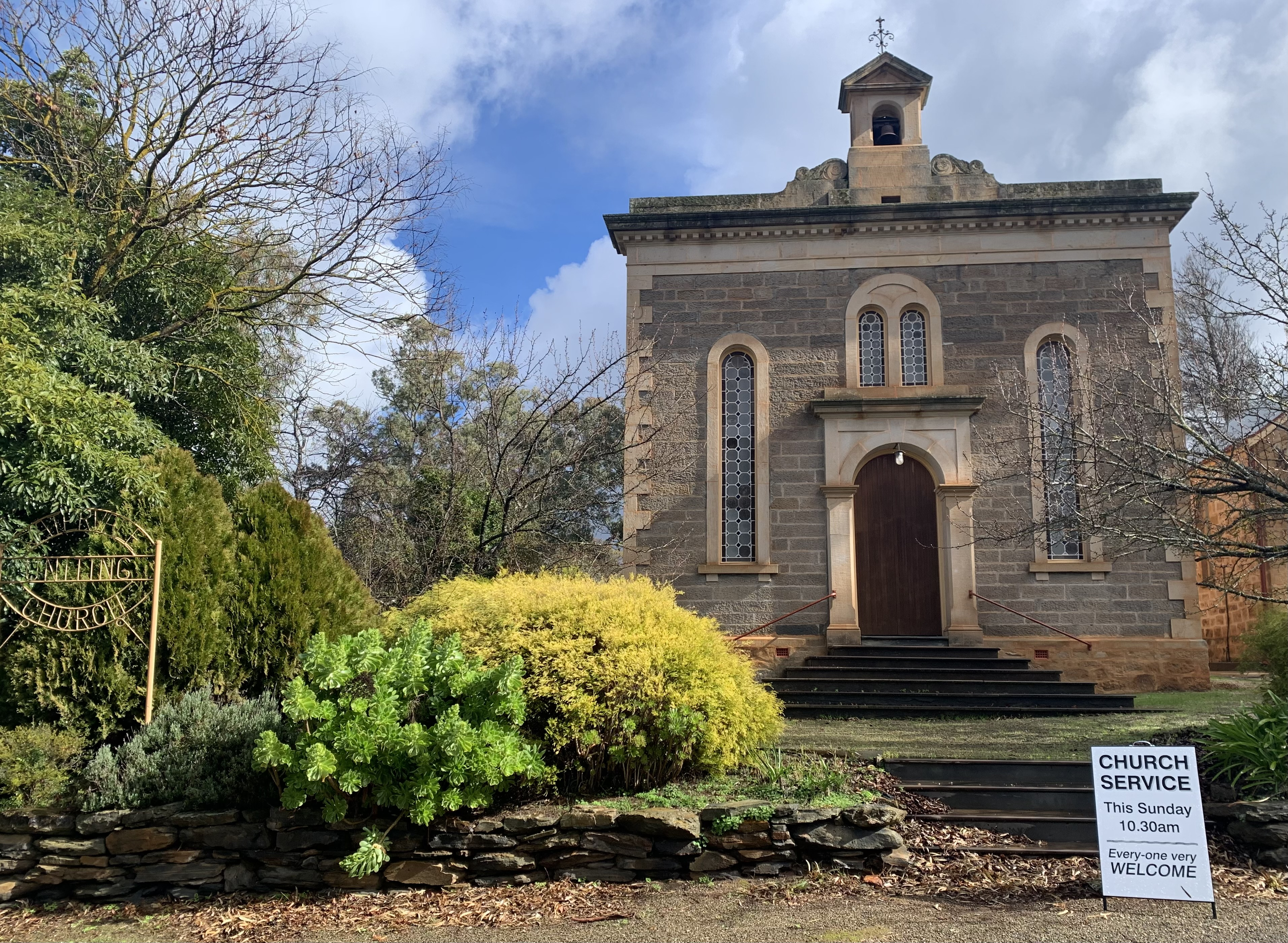
The Uniting Church in Watervale, previously The Bible Christian Church, built approximately 1855

The second vineyard in the Clare Valley was planted by Valentine Mayr, who planted four acres at his property 'Pomona', (an apple and pear orchard) in Watervale in 1852, and made his first wine in 1856. In 1870 he expanded his plantings to thirty acres of shiraz and verdelho, which is now the site of Crabtree Watervale Wines, located on North Terrace, just off the Horrocks Highway and not far from the Riesling Trail.

The heritage listed Quelltaler Estate dates back to 1865. Francis Treloar, formerly a miner at Burra, bought 117 acres of land near Watervale in 1851, for a winery which he named Spring Vale. Treloar established the Springvale wine cellars in 1868: sections of these stone cellars, dug into the hillside (as was typical of cellars at that time) survive. In 1890 T. G. H. Buring and Carl Sobels joined forces and purchased the Spring Vale vineyard and plant. This winery subsequently was developed as Quelltaler, known more recently, as Annie's Lane. In 2017 this winery and vineyards were bought by Seppeltsfield.

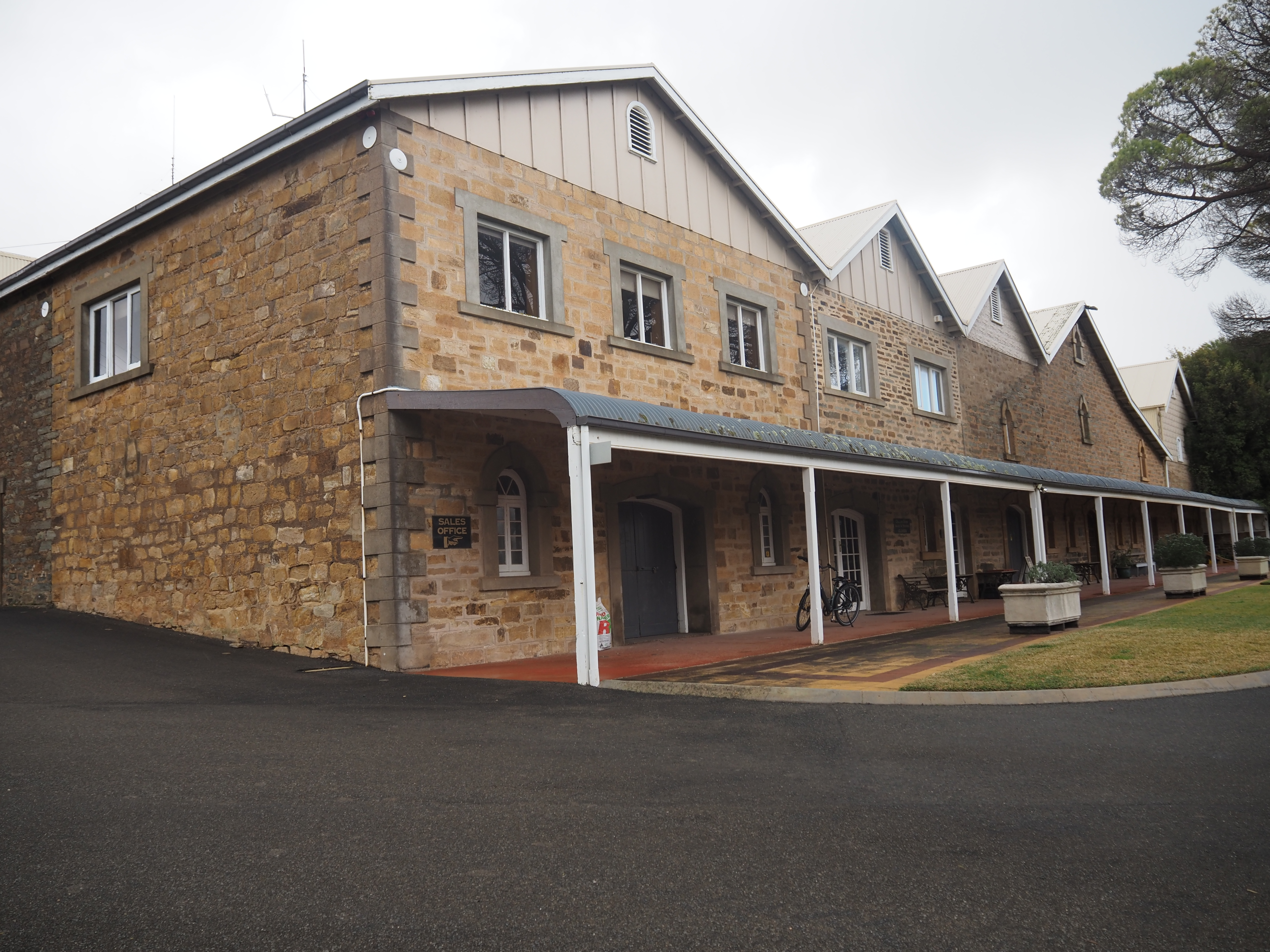
Quelltaler Winery

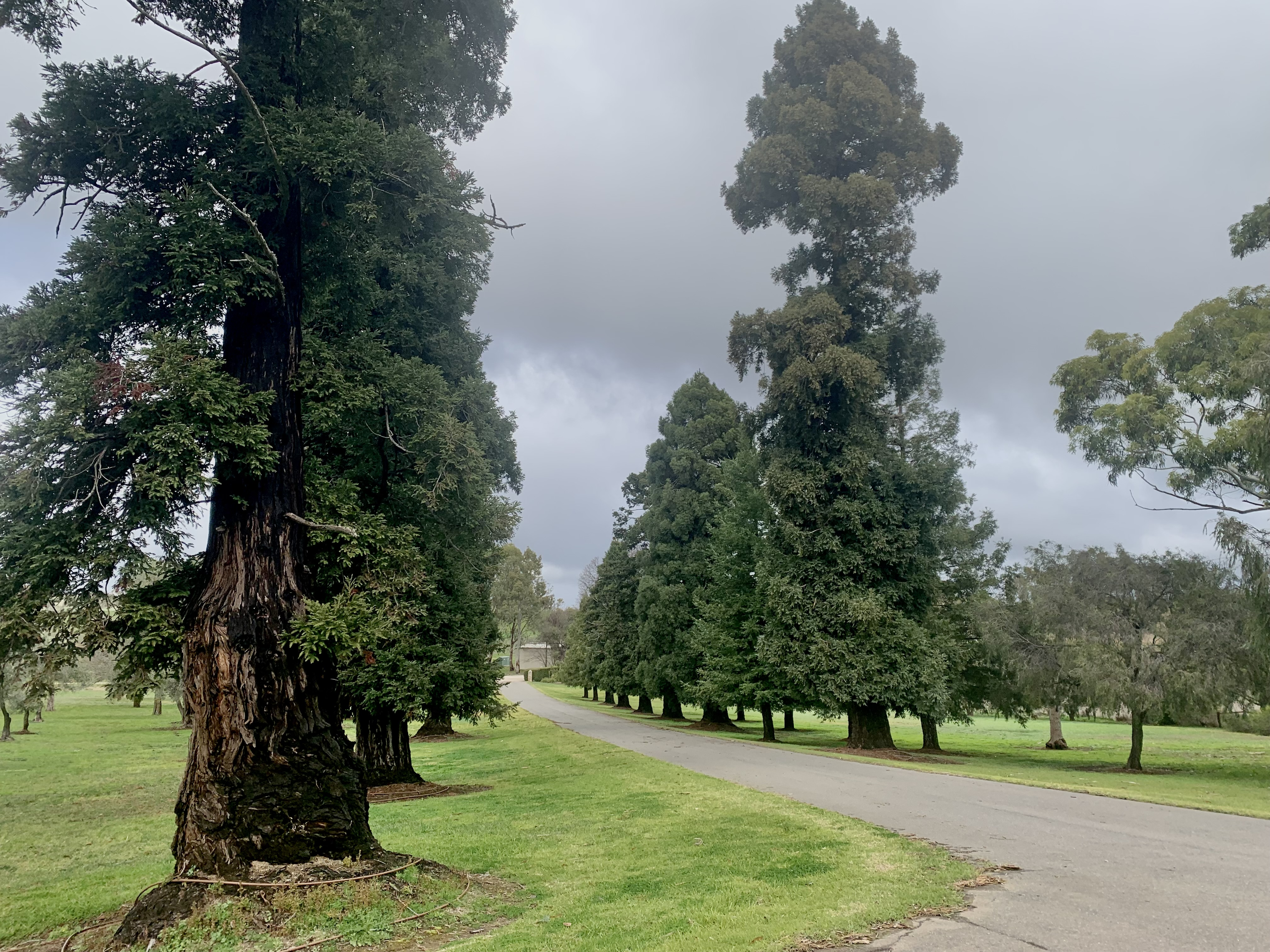
Historic Sequoia Driveway leading to Quelltaler Winery

Hughes Park Estate, extending over 3,000 hectares, is three km from Watervale in the Skilly valley, where the first stone homestead was completed in 1860. It was built by Sir Walter Watson Hughes, who owned the Wallaroo and Moonta copper mines and founded Adelaide University from his profits. Still owned by the Duncan family, over the years many Watervale residents have found work there. At present the restored two-story homestead caters for weddings and the restored 1845 worker's cottages are now rented as a B&B.

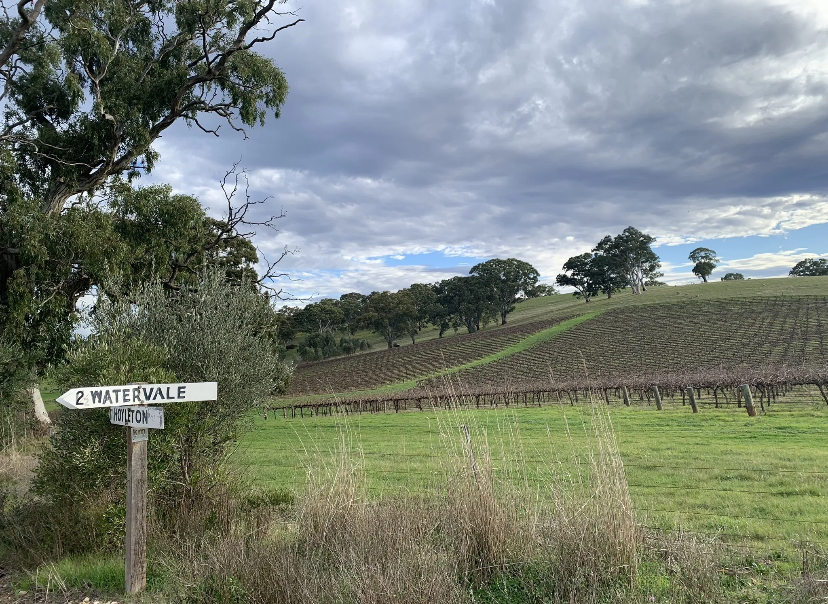
Accessing Watervale from the Hughes Park road in The Skilly

== The town today ==
The township boasts a post office, bakery/cafe, hotel, primary school, CFS unit, a Uniting church,

A public concert of Medieval music being performed in the Watervale Uniting Church

a small number of local businesses and a winery. A variety of recreational facilities are located at the "Watervale Soldiers' Memorial Park" (tennis club and courts, the Watervale Redbacks Cricket Club and a bowling green). In recent times "The Vale" was completed and provides a community hub for the Town.

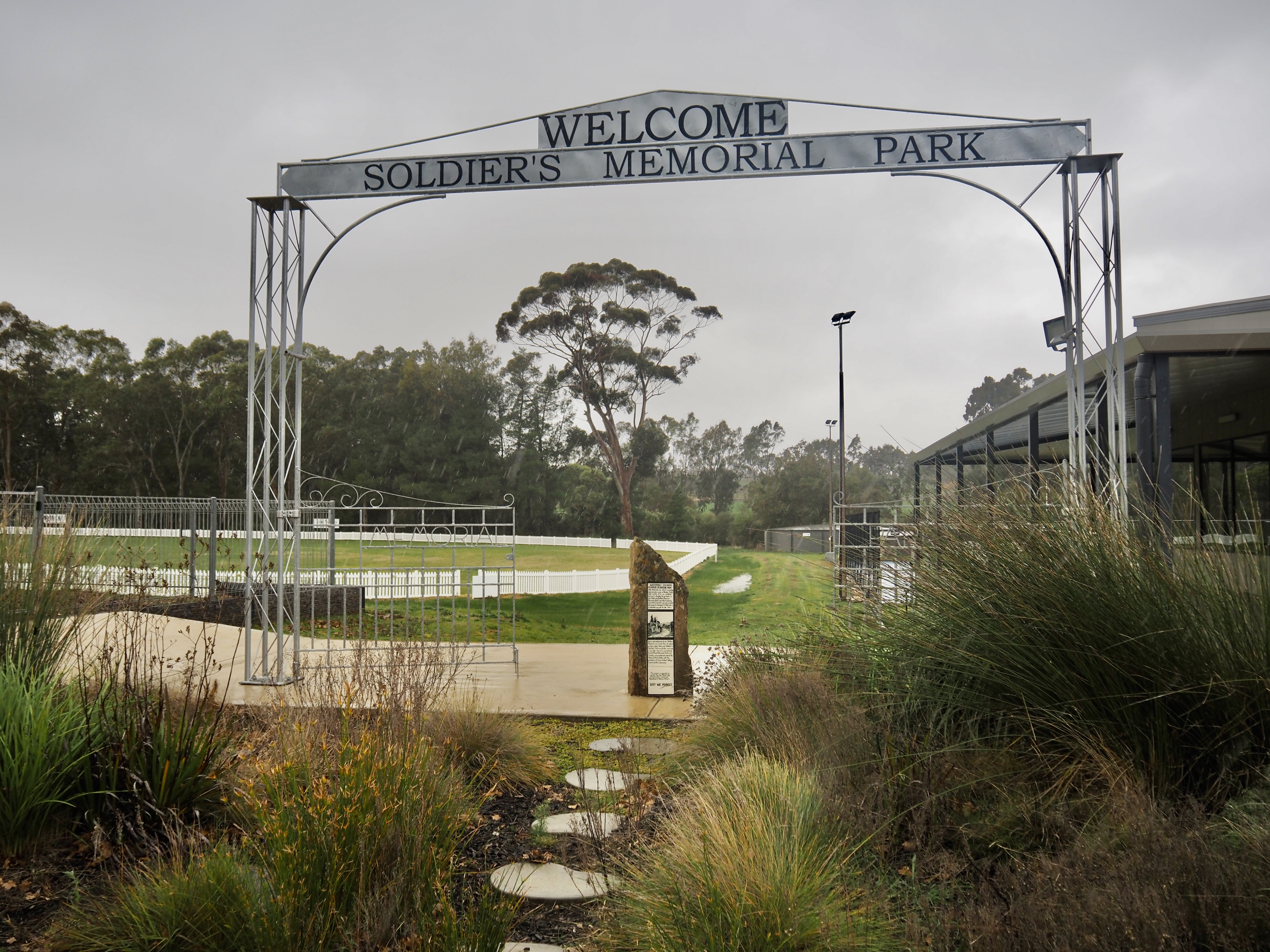
Watervale Soldier's Memorial Park

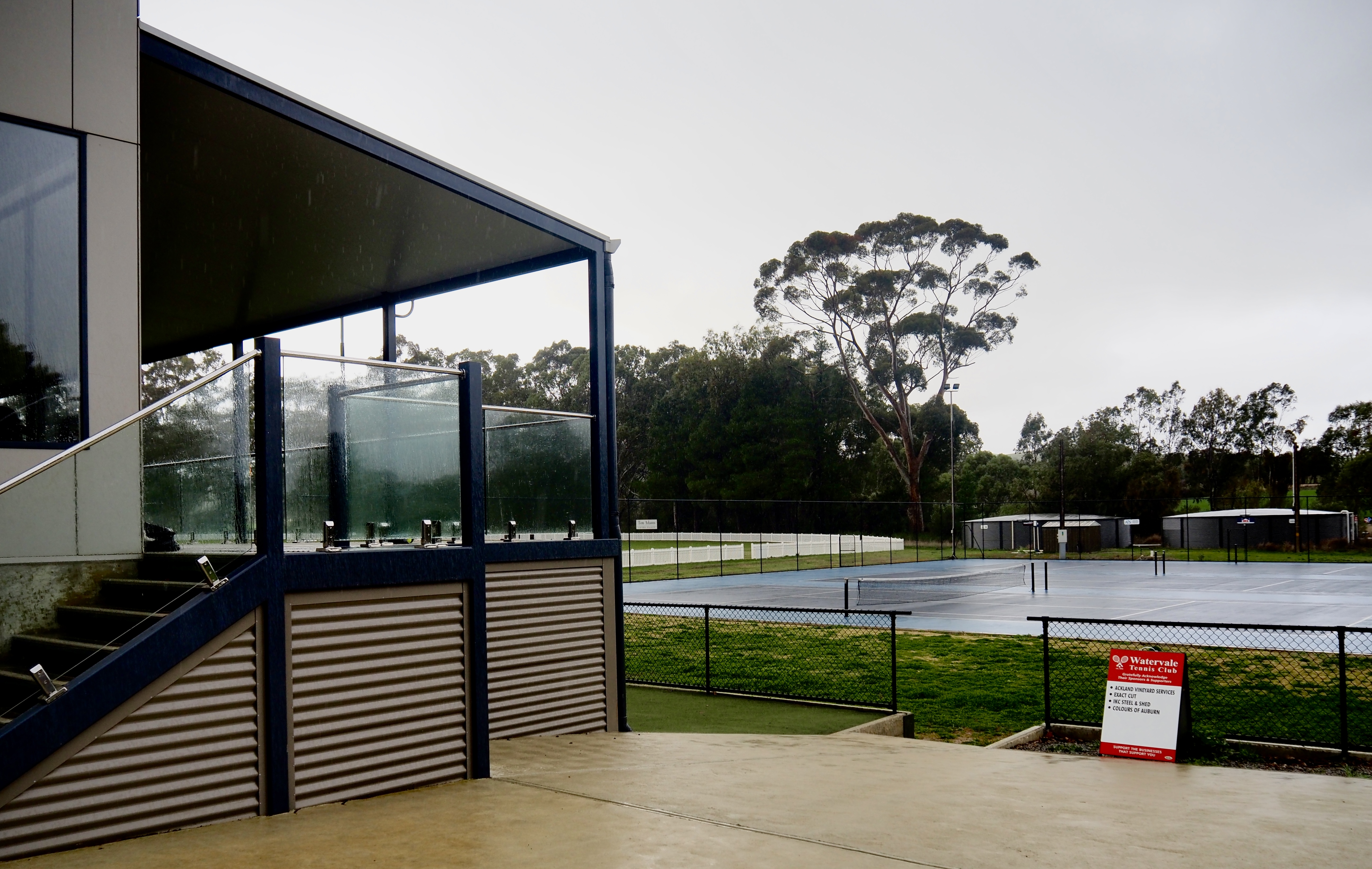
The Vale Community Hub and Tennis Clubrooms

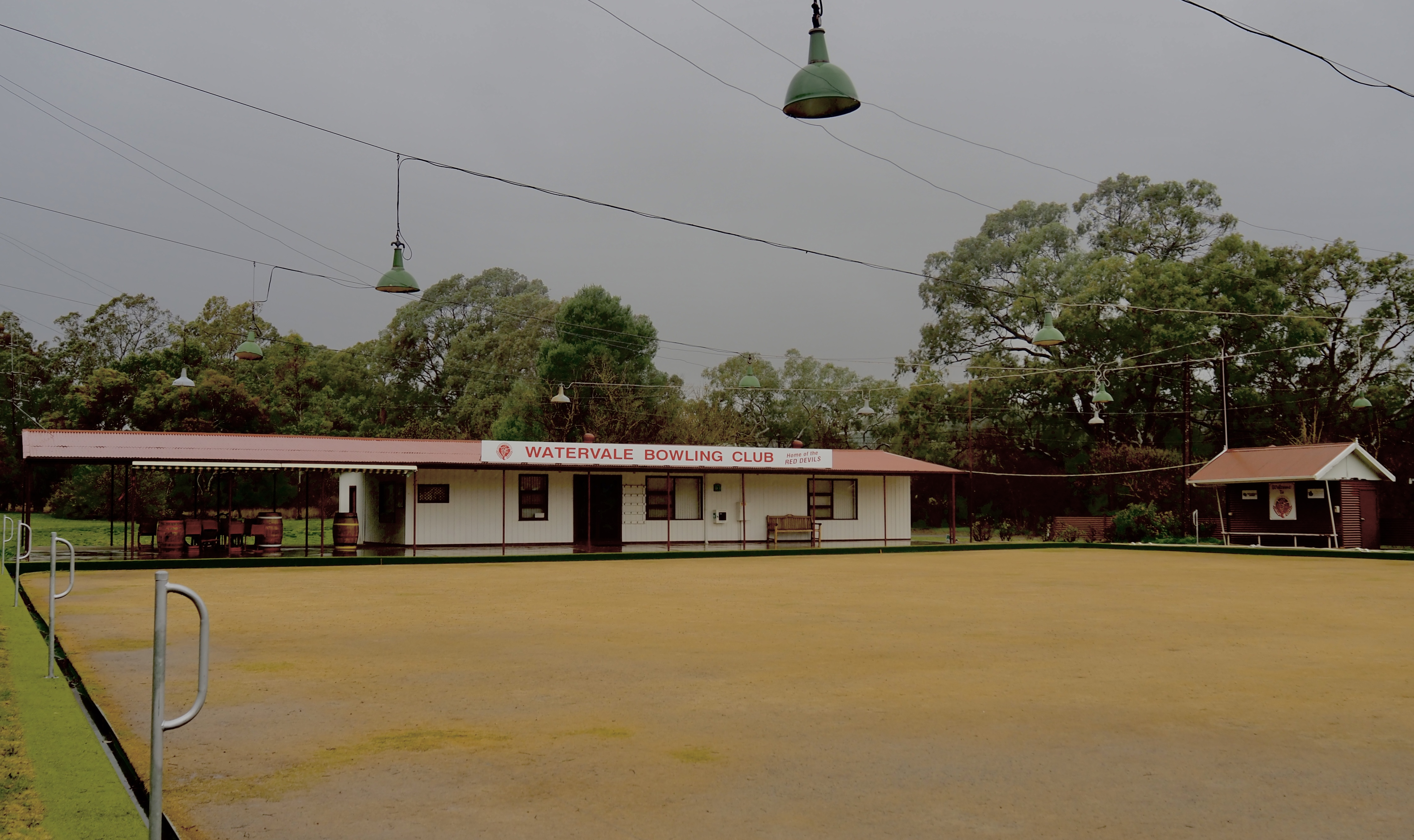
Watervale Bowling Club

Several bed and breakfast and holiday cottages are available for rent, including Watervale Retreat, Battunga B&B, Mulberry House and as previously mentioned the Old Stanley Grammar School. The town can be readily accessed from the Riesling Trail.

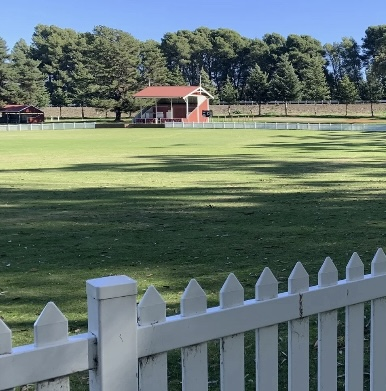
The historic Watervale Grandstand

The historic Grandstand overlooking the town oval was renovated in 2010.

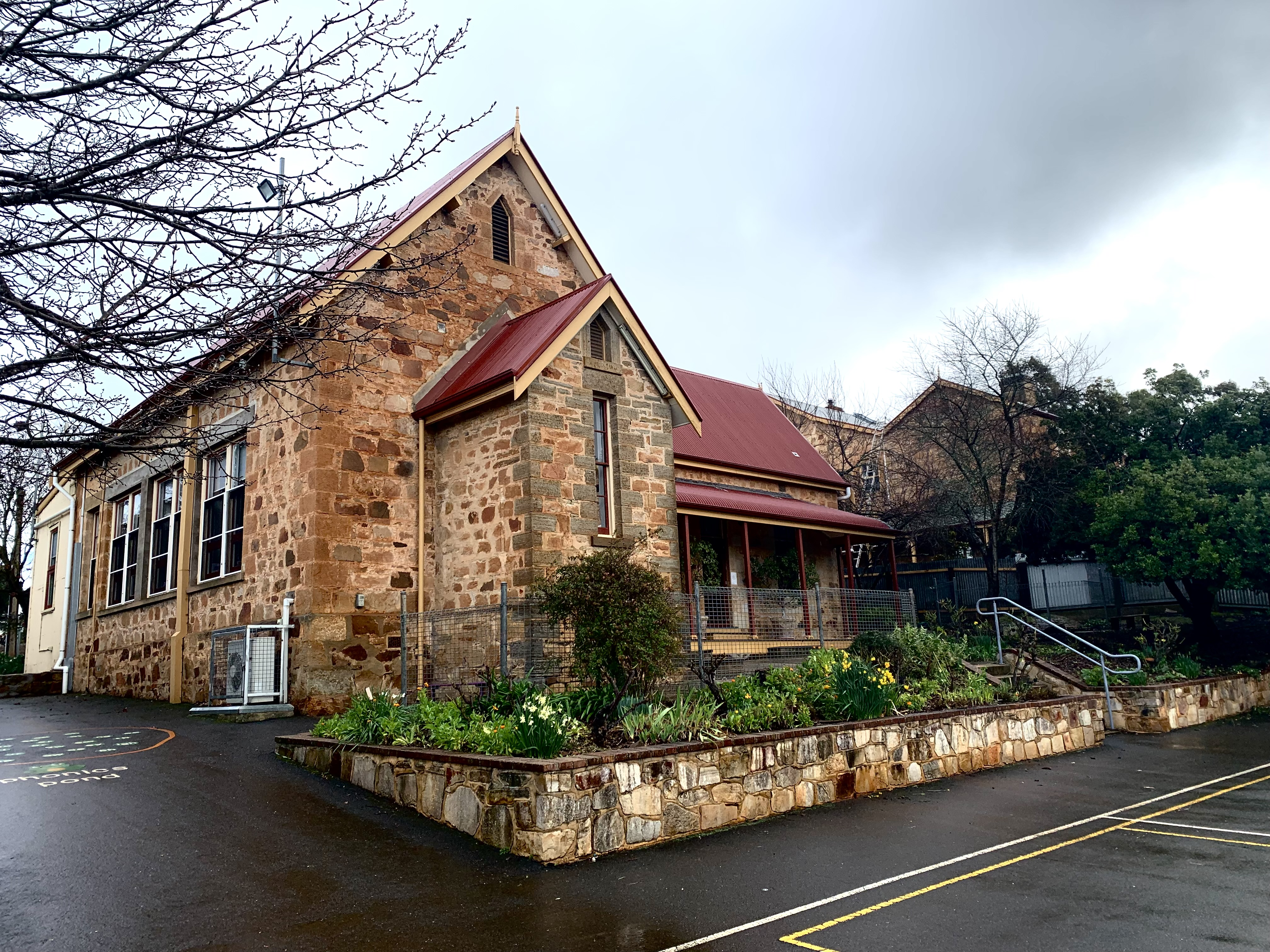
The Watervale Primary School built in approximately 1860, students having previously been taught in the Bible Christian Church hall opposite

As part of the Clare Valley, Watervale is regarded globally as the home of high quality and distinctive Riesling. The terra rossa loam over limestone soils are particularly suited to this variety's purity and structure. Many winemakers source their Riesling fruit from blocks grown in the Watervale sub region. Cabernet and Shiraz grapes are also grown in the Watervale region.

A local artist of note is Harry Sherwin. Some of his work can be seen inside the Watervale Hotel.

Watervale once hosted an annual 'Day on the Green' concert at Annie's Lane, attracting up to 6,000 concert-goers.

The Watervale Foresters Hall, which in the past had been used for School Christmas concerts and community dances and in more recent years had been used by the community for meetings, art classes and a children's playgroup, had by 2009 fallen into disrepair. It was subsequently sold by the Watervale Community Association following considerable discussion and consultation amongst the townspeople and is now in private ownership.

== Governance ==
Watervale is in the District Council of Clare and Gilbert Valleys, the state electoral district of Frome, and the Australian House of Representatives Division of Grey.

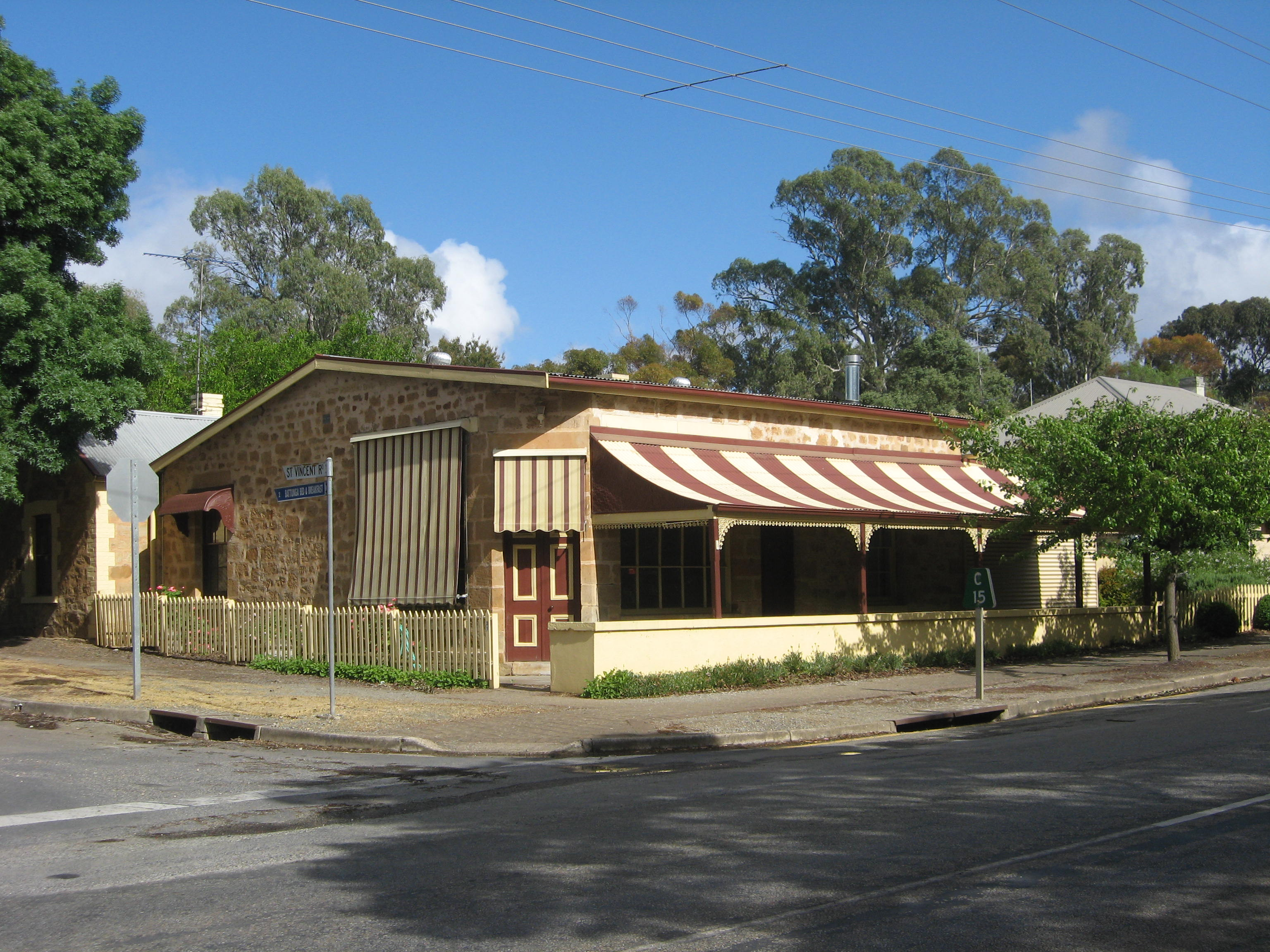
Joseph Bennett's home and saddlery shop, 1853 to 1873, at corner Main North Road and St Vincent Road, Watervale, South Australia. Bennett was also postmaster, registrar of births deaths and marriages, and special constable.

== See also ==
- Stanley Football Association
