= Long Flat, South Australia =

Long Flat
- Town
- Coordinates: 35.1322°S 139.3112°E
- Country: Australia
- State: South Australia
- LGA: Rural City of Murray Bridge

Government
  - State electorate: Hammond
  - Federal division: Barker
- Postcode: 5253
Localities around Long Flat
Mobilong	Murray Bridge East	Murray Bridge East
Murray Bridge	Long Flat	Burdett
Swanport	Monteith	Kepa

Long Flat is a semi-rural satellite locality of Murray Bridge in South Australia on the east bank of the Murray River south of the eponymous bridge and Swanport Bridge.

The locality was formally named after the Long Flat Irrigation Area in March 2000.

== Location ==
Its boundaries were formalised in March 2000 to cover a portion of land immediately across the river to the east of the main Murray Bridge conurbation. It is bounded on the north and east by the Adelaide-Melbourne railway line, on the south by the South Eastern Freeway, and on the west by a 4.7 km (2.9 mi) stretch of the river. The defunct Rabila Railway Station is on the locality's northern boundary. Long Island Recreation Park on Long Island, within the Murray River, is westerly adjacent to the locality.

== See also ==
- List of cities and towns in South Australia
