= Intract =

Construction and building maintenance contracting company

Intract Indigenous Contractors
- Industry: Construction and contracting
- Founded: 2010; 15 years ago
- Founder: McMahon Services
- Headquarters: Adelaide and Darwin, Australia
- Key people: John Briggs, Michael Rotumah, Andrew McLeod
- Number of employees: 50
- Parent: McMahon Services (49%)
- Website: www.intract.com.au

Intract Australia is an Australian construction and building maintenance contracting company. It was established to provide employment and training opportunities for indigenous Australians. It was established in 2010 as a business unit of McMahon Services. It is now 51% owned, managed and controlled by indigenous people. Intract built the 15 km-long shared path as part of the Northern Connector freeway project in South Australia.

Intract owns some of the equipment it uses, but also has access to a larger pool of earthmoving and other equipment through its parent company, McMahon Services.
