= Woods Point, South Australia =

Woods Point
- Town
- Coordinates: 35.2206°S 139.3813°E
- Country: Australia
- State: South Australia
- LGA: Rural City of Murray Bridge
- Location: 10 km (6.2 mi) south of Murray Bridge

Government
  - State electorate: Hammond
  - Federal division: Barker

Population
  - Total: 188 (SAL 2021)
- Postcode: 5253
Localities around Woods Point
Monteith, White Sands	Tailem Bend	Tailem Bend
Brinkley	Woods Point	Tailem Bend
Brinkley	Jervois	Jervois

Woods Point is a satellite locality of Murray Bridge in South Australia on the west bank of the Murray River adjacent to White Sands and overlooking the east bank locality of Tailem Bend.

== See also ==
- List of cities and towns in South Australia
