= Wellington, South Australia =

Wellington
- Town
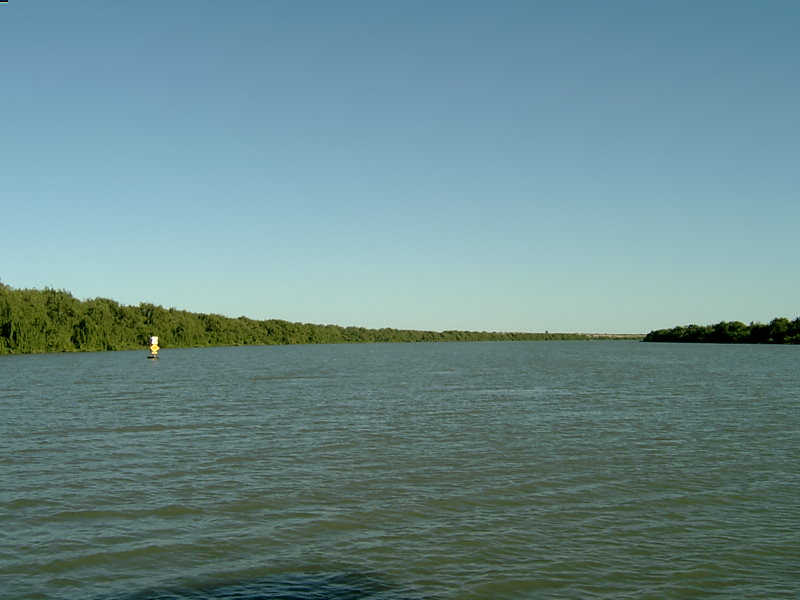
- Crossing the Murray River by ferry at Wellington

- Coordinates: 35°20′02″S 139°22′55″E
- Country: Australia
- State: South Australia
- LGA: Rural City of Murray Bridge
- Location: 105 km (65 mi) from Adelaide
- Established: November 1840

Government
  - State electorate: Hammond
  - Federal division: Barker

Population
  - Total: 184 (SAL 2021)
- Postcode: 5259
Localities around Wellington
Brinkley	Jervois
Mulgundawa	Wellington	Wellington East
Nalpa	Lake Alexandrina

Wellington is a township in South Australia, Australia on the Murray River (River Murray in South Australia) just upstream of where it empties into Lake Alexandrina. Its postcode is 5259. Wellington is in the Rural City of Murray Bridge. At the 2006 census, Wellington had a population of 295.

== History ==
Because of its geographical similarities, the first European colonists likened the development potential of the site of Wellington to that of New Orleans. In 1839 the London-based Secondary Towns Association, represented in Adelaide by John Morphett and John Hill, authorised expenditure on the special survey a proposed town to be named Wellington, with prior consent of the Duke of Wellington himself.

Despite never having seen the land except on a map, the directors of the Association had great hopes for Wellington becoming an important town. The survey eventually provided for 700 lots in Wellington (west side of the Murray) and 300 lots in Wellington East (east side of the Murray), as well as rural sections. Surveyors Cannan and Henderson carried out the survey in November 1840 and the first lots were sold in July 1841.

== Ferry crossing ==
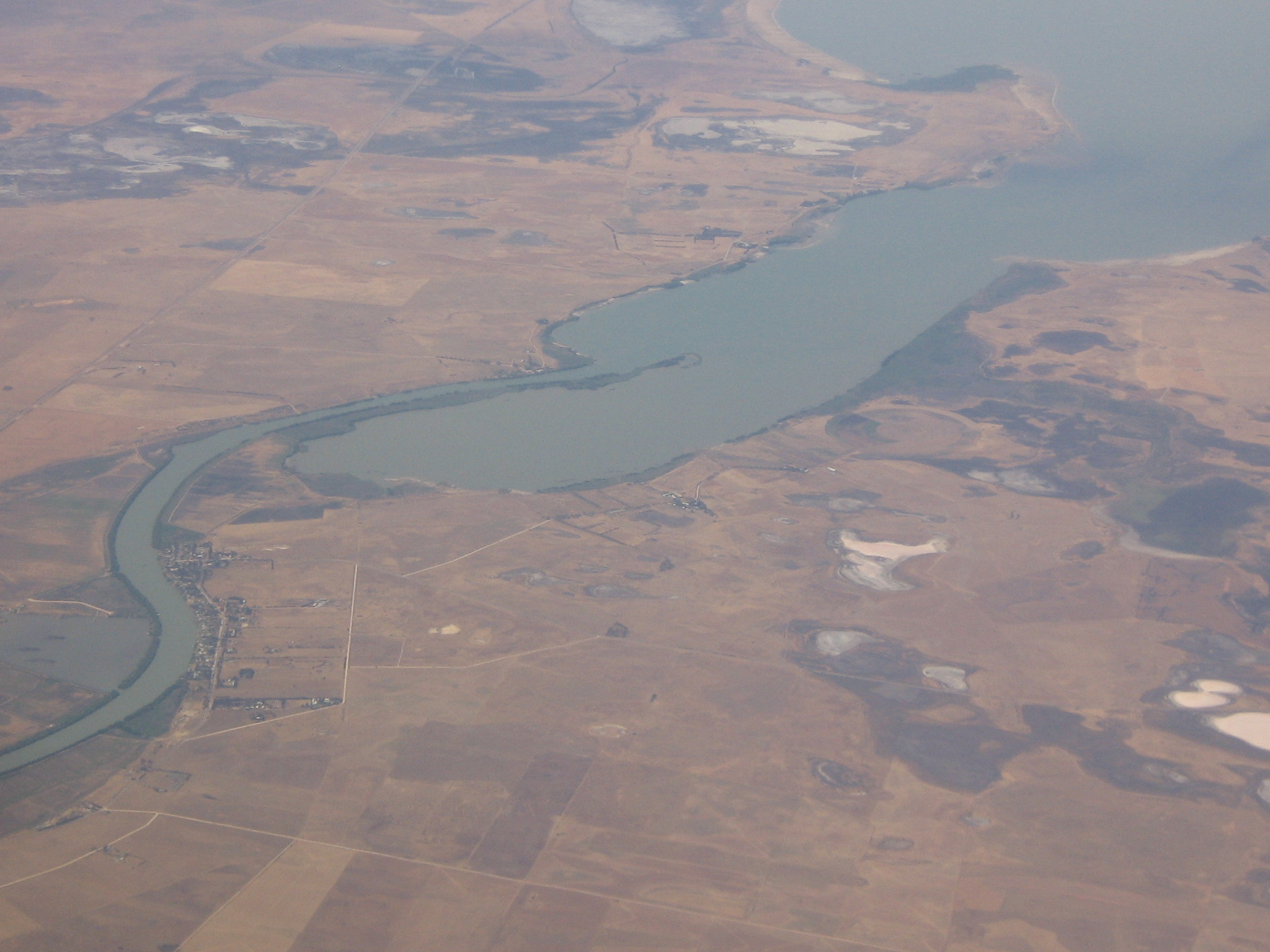
Wellington on the bank of the Murray just before it empties into Lake Alexandrina

Wellington was the original crossing of the River Murray for people, livestock, and goods travelling overland between Adelaide and Melbourne, until a bridge was built at Murray Bridge in 1879. There is still a free government ferry operating here. In 1852-53 much of the gold escorted by South Australian Police from the Victorian gold rushes crossed the Murray at Wellington. Even though the Murray has very little flow most of the time, and Lake Alexandrina is mostly only a few metres deep, the river at Wellington is about 25 metres deep. The surface is often less than one metre above sea level.

== Township ==
Once established, Wellington became a busy ferry crossing point for several decades during the 1840s to 1870s. Servicing the local pastoral district, it soon had a school, police station, and hotels, but it never prospered beyond township status.

The government of South Australia has stated its intention to build a weir at or near Wellington, despite opposition from environmental groups. Under the plan, no water would flow from the Murray into the lower lakes or Coorong during drought or other periods of low flow.

== See also ==
- List of cities and towns in South Australia
- List of crossings of the Murray River
