= Unity College, Murray Bridge =

Private school in South Australia

Coordinates: 35°08′48″S 139°17′15″E

- Murray Bridge, South Australia; Australia

Information
- Former name: Murray Bridge Lutheran School
- Religious affiliation: Lutheranism
- Established: 1978; 48 years ago
- Principal: Kaye Mathwin-Cox
- Grades: Reception - Year 12
- Enrollment: c.650

Unity College is a Lutheran school in Murray Bridge, South Australia. Unity teaches students from reception to Year 12. There are about 650 students enrolled at Unity College. The current principal is Kaye Mathwin-Cox.

== Unity College history ==
1978–1989

The Murray Bridge Lutheran School was officially opened on Sunday 6 May 1978 by Federal Member for Barker, James Porter, before a crowd of 400 people. Enrolments were initially expected to be at 145 students at the conclusion of the first year.

Founding staff included the principal, Trevor Winderlich, teaching staff; Marjorie Wilke, Ruth Hayter, Coralie Fielke, Ann Pfeiffer, and Jenny Gogel in the office. The whole school community goals and vision at that time was to be a caring, sharing community of Christians with a common goal – to educate the children to fill a useful place in society as Christian citizens.

The school's 2nd principal, Leon Zander, started after former principal, Trevor Winderlich, transferred to the new Lutheran School at Golden Grove.

The Secondary Schools Association again became active with a view of submitting another application.

1989–2000

In 1994 an intensive feasibility study within the local catchment area was conducted in March. In June, this report was presented to the Steering Committee and a committee of the Lutheran Church of SA District. The main recommendation from this report states "That approval be given to Murray Bridge Lutheran School to make an application to extend its school to include secondary education."

In 1995 an application to extend to Year 10 was submitted to DEET in Canberra and approved. In 1996 planning started for Middle Schooling at the Murray Bridge Lutheran College to allow for R-12 Study.

In 1997 Year 8 commenced for the first time on the Junior Campus in transportable buildings which were brought in from the Pennington Hostel site in Adelaide.

Stage 1 of construction commenced in April and consisted of a permanent dual classroom with associated student amenities and a science block.

Education on the Middle/Senior Campus commenced on Day 1 Term 4 1997 for Year 6, 7 and 8 students.

Construction of The Steeple began and in 1998 The Steeple was completed and handed over.

Construction of Stage 2 began in July – the Technology building – which comprises a Canteen, Home Economics area, two Computer Labs and a temporary location for our Resource Centre. Student amenities were also incorporated in this stage of development.

Construction of Stage 3 on the Middle/Senior Campus began in May 1999, an addition to the Technology Building comprising two art spaces – one for design and the other for painting – an electronics workshop and a tech studies facility. Completed in September 1999. The school received official approval to extend to Year 11 and 12 in July.

2000–2010

In 2000 Neville Grieger was appointed as principal of Unity College.

Stage 4 of construction was begun, the present Resource Centre, commenced. However the building was initially designed to provide 7 classrooms, a computer lab, staff area and small meeting room. Two ovals on the Middle/Senior Campus were constructed.

With the ever-growing demand for music tuition, areas on the Junior Campus were redeveloped into music practise rooms and the shelter shed was into classroom space.

In 2001 the first class of Year 12 students graduated from Unity College.

Construction of Reception classrooms commenced in October. Four classrooms were built together with wet areas and a lawned play area.

In 2002, as part of the Junior School Reception classroom redevelopment, the new student amenities were provided for these students on the Junior Campus. February 2002 saw the expansion of the Middle School with 4 additional classrooms, an ICT room, staff offices and preparation area, together with a mall, to house student lockers, which linked the new and existing buildings. During this process, we relocated the two double transportable buildings to another location on site to house Music and Drama.

It was decided to convert the Steeple into our worship area. This involved lining the building, providing heating and cooling, seating and audio-visual equipment. The Steeple upgrade was completed in October and has since become a venue that is in constant use by students and the wider community.

Refurbishment to provide a Resource Centre in the R Block. This involved converting two classrooms into a larger space by removing walls opening into the mall area.

November was the official opening of the Middle School General Learning Areas, the Junior School toilets and the Resource Centre.

Administration Building Upgrade was completed in March 2004 and officially opened on 11 June.

The Plaza, Memorial Garden and landscaping was completed in conjunction with the Administration building project and completed in time for Synod on 13 August 2004. Performing Arts building completed in Term 2, 2004. It was officially opened by Alan and Rhonda Packer on 2 September 2004. Senior Centre was completed for the commencement of the 2005 school year.

In mid-2007, Ilene Thiel was appointed as principal.

At the beginning of 2010, the foundations were laid for the new school gymnasium and the school language centre. Hopefully, these buildings will be completed at the end of 2010, or the beginning of 2011. The Year 9 building is a planned housing for specifically Year 8/9 classrooms, a computer room and lockers. The Language Centre will be a joint learning area, shared by the German, Japanese and Indigenous Education faculties. Fully AV equipped classrooms and computer terminals will be built, plus a kitchen area for cultural tastings, and an art area for Aboriginal students.

== Curriculum ==
Unity College's curriculum is broad and varied, accommodating for the range of specialist teachers and the needs and interest of students. The compulsory and optional subjects change from Junior School to Senior school, but core subjects are English, Maths, Science, Christian Studies and SOSE subjects. Optional subject choices include, but aren't limited to, German and Japanese, Drama, Music, Agriculture, Art, Technical Studies, ICT, Woodwork, PE, and Home Economics. Flexibility in subject choices become apparent from Year 8 onwards. The Year 6's have one lesson a week of peer support.

== Events ==
Many events are scheduled each year including Sports Days, Agricultural Shows, Parent Functions and a School Musical every second year.

== Naming and logo ==
Initially called Murray Bridge Lutheran School (MBLS) the name was changed to Unity College in 1997. Along with this name change in 2002 a new school logo was voted on, featuring Swanport Bridge's three pillars as symbols for the Christian Father, Son and Holy Spirit.

== Exchange program ==
As part of the language program at Unity students are offered the subjects of Japanese and German. Not only do the students study the language, but they also learn about the culture and the importance of Cross Cultural Sensitivity in the modern world. To help them gain a better understanding of other cultures outside of the classroom, in 2002,

Unity College began an exchange program in Tokyo, Japan. A group of students come for two weeks and go to school at Unity College. They learn how Australians live and are able to see different landmarks, such as Kangaroo Island. Australian Students then have the opportunity to go to Japan. Gifts are given to students and schools to show that they are welcome.

Aside from this structured exchange program Unity also plays host to other Exchange students throughout the school year. There is also a Service Learning program offered to Areyonga in the Northern Territory and also to Indonesia.

== See also ==
- Chuo University Suginami High School, part of an exchange program with Unity College
