= Brinkley, South Australia =

Brinkley South Australia
- Coordinates: 35.230°S 139.222°E
- Population: 107 (SAL 2021)
- Postcode(s): 5253
- Location: 16 km (10 mi) NW of Murray Bridge
- LGA(s): Rural City of Murray Bridge
- State electorate(s): Hammond
- Federal division(s): Barker
Localities around Brinkley:
Monarto South	Gifford Hill; Murray Bridge South; White Sands	Riverglen; Monteith
Monarto South; Langhorne Creek	Brinkley	Woods Point; Jervois
Langhorne Creek	Mulgundawa; Wellington	Wellington
- Footnotes: Coordinates

Brinkley is a locality and former township in South Australia west of the Murray River and approximately 16 kilometres (9.9 mi) south west by road from the centre of Murray Bridge. Its boundaries for the long-established locality were formalised in March 2000. It is named for the cadastral division in which it lies, the Hundred of Brinkley, which itself was named after Captain M. Brinkley who in 1860 was the clerk of the state's Executive Council.

== Hundred of Brinkley ==
The Hundred of Brinkley is larger than the modern locality boundaries. It includes all or most of the localities and towns:

- Brinkley
- White Sands
- Woods Point
- Jervois
- Mulgundawa
- Nalpa
- Wellington

== See also ==
- List of cities and towns in South Australia
