= Monarto South, South Australia =

Monarto South South Australia
- Coordinates: 35°07′19″S 139°07′44″E
- Population: 152 (SAL 2021)
- Established: 1973
- Postcode(s): 5254
- Time zone: ACST (UTC+9:30)
  - Summer (DST): ACDT (UTC+10:30)
- Location: 67 km (42 mi) ESE of Adelaide
- LGA(s): Rural City of Murray Bridge
- State electorate(s): Kavel
- Federal division(s): Barker
Localities around Monarto South:
Callington	Monarto	Rocky Gully
Callington, Hartley	Monarto South	White Hill, Gifford Hill
Hartley	Langhorne Creek	Brinkley

Monarto South is a locality in South Australia 16 km (9.9 mi) west of the Murray River and 65 km (40 mi) south east by road from Adelaide. The Monarto South railway station is north of the South Eastern Freeway between the Callington and Murray Bridge exits, but the locality spans south of the freeway to Chaunceys Line Road and Ferries McDonald Conservation Park.

In the late 1970s Monarto Junction (or "New Murray Town") was proposed to be the site of a new satellite city of Adelaide. By the turn of the century the proposal had been completely abandoned.

Monarto South took its name from the cadastral Hundred of Monarto (established 1847) centred on the original township of Monarto to the north. The name of the hundred was after "Queen Monarto", an aboriginal woman (spouse of a tribal leader) who lived in the area at the time of its proclamation.

== Transport ==
Monarto South is adjacent to the main Adelaide to Wolseley line, with Monarto South station formerly a junction for the Sedan branch line running north on the plain between the Murray River and the Mount Lofty Ranges.

In the 2010s, a local government project to upgrade Ferries McDonald Road commenced in Monarto South which included bitumization of the road. Due to the presence of mallee fowl in the vicinity the project had to go through several iterations to ensure that the environmental impact is minimized. Completion of the project would create a heavy transport link from Langhorne Creek to the Barossa Valley.

== Parks ==
There are several significant parks within or overlapping into Monarto South, including:

- Monarto Conservation Park (Braendler Scrub)
- Loomooloo Sanctuary
- Ferries McDonald Conservation Park
- Monarto Woodlands Conservation Park

== See also ==
- Monarto, South Australia
- List of cities and towns in South Australia
