= Kinchina Conservation Park =

Protected area in South Australia

- IUCN category VI (protected area with sustainable use of natural resources)
- Location within South Australia
- Location: South Australia
- Nearest city: Murray Bridge
- Coordinates: 35°06′40″S 139°13′37″E
- Area: 4.14 km^{2} (1.60 sq mi)
- Established: 22 September 2016
- Governing body: Department for Environment and Water

Kinchina Conservation Park is a protected area in the Australian state of South Australia in the north of the Gifford Hill Range on the eastern flanks the localities of Rocky Gully and White Hill, west of Murray Bridge.

It was proclaimed under the National Parks and Wildlife Act 1972 on 22 September 2016 along with the preservation of any “existing and future rights of entry, prospecting, exploration or mining” on eight parcels of adjoining land in the cadastral unit of the Hundred of Mobilong. As of September 2016, it covered an area of 4.14 square kilometres (1.60 sq mi).

An announcement made on 22 September 2016 by Ian Hunter, the Minister for Sustainability, Environment & Conservation in the South Australian government described both the conservation park and the nearby Monarto Woodlands Conservation Park as follows:

The two new parks at Monarto support high levels of biodiversity, in part created by the now- mature plantings associated with the proposed development of a satellite city at Monarto in the 1970s. Protection of these areas is consistent with the Government’s Conserving Nature 2012-2020 strategy to conserve a range of ecosystems.

The Kinchina Conservation Park – about 5 kilometres west of Murray Bridge – protects grassy woodland communities considered of high conservation significance and provides habitat for a number of birds that are in decline in the Mount Lofty Ranges, including the diamond firetail, Australasian darter and hooded robin.

The Lavender Federation Trail passes through part of the conservation park on its way from its southern trailhead at Murray Bridge to Mount Beevor in the west.

The conservation park is classified as an IUCN Category VI protected area.

== See also ==
- Protected areas of South Australia
