= Murray Bridge South, South Australia =

Murray Bridge South
- Suburb
- Interactive map of Murray Bridge South
- Coordinates: 35.166°S 139.277°E
- Country: Australia
- State: South Australia
- City: Murray Bridge
- LGA: Rural City of Murray Bridge

Government
  - State electorate: Hammond
  - Federal division: Barker

Population
  - Total: 189 (SAL 2021)
- Postcode: 5253
Suburbs around Murray Bridge South
| Murray Bridge | Murray Bridge | Murray Bridge |
| Gifford Hill | Murray Bridge South | Swanport; Riverglen |
| Brinkley | Brinkley | White Sands |

Murray Bridge South is a satellite locality of Murray Bridge in South Australia west of the Murray River, south of the eponymous bridge, and west of Swanport Bridge. Its boundaries were formalised in March 2000 to cover a portion of semi-urban land immediately south of the South Eastern Freeway and immediately west of the riverside suburbs of Swanport and Riverglen.

== See also ==
- List of cities and towns in South Australia
