= White Hill, South Australia =

White Hill
- Town
- Coordinates: 35.137°S 139.223°E
- Country: Australia
- State: South Australia
- LGA: Rural City of Murray Bridge

Government
  - State electorate: Hammond
  - Federal division: Barker

Area
  - Total: 7.52 km^{2} (2.90 sq mi)

Population
  - Total: 111 (SAL 2021)
- Postcode: 5254
Localities around White Hill
Rocky Gully	Rocky Gully	Murray Bridge
Monarto South	White Hill	Murray Bridge
Monarto South	Gifford Hill	Gifford Hill

White Hill is a semi-rural locality approximately 5.6 kilometres (3.5 mi) west of the centre of Murray Bridge by road. It is named for the geographical feature of the same name, part of the Gifford Hills Range, which runs parallel to the Murray River on the western side of Murray Bridge, from Gifford Hill to Rocky Gully and Kinchina Conservation Park.

Large parts of Kinchina Conservation Park and Monarto Woodlands Conservation Park are within the locality.
