= Monteith, South Australia =

Monteith
- Town
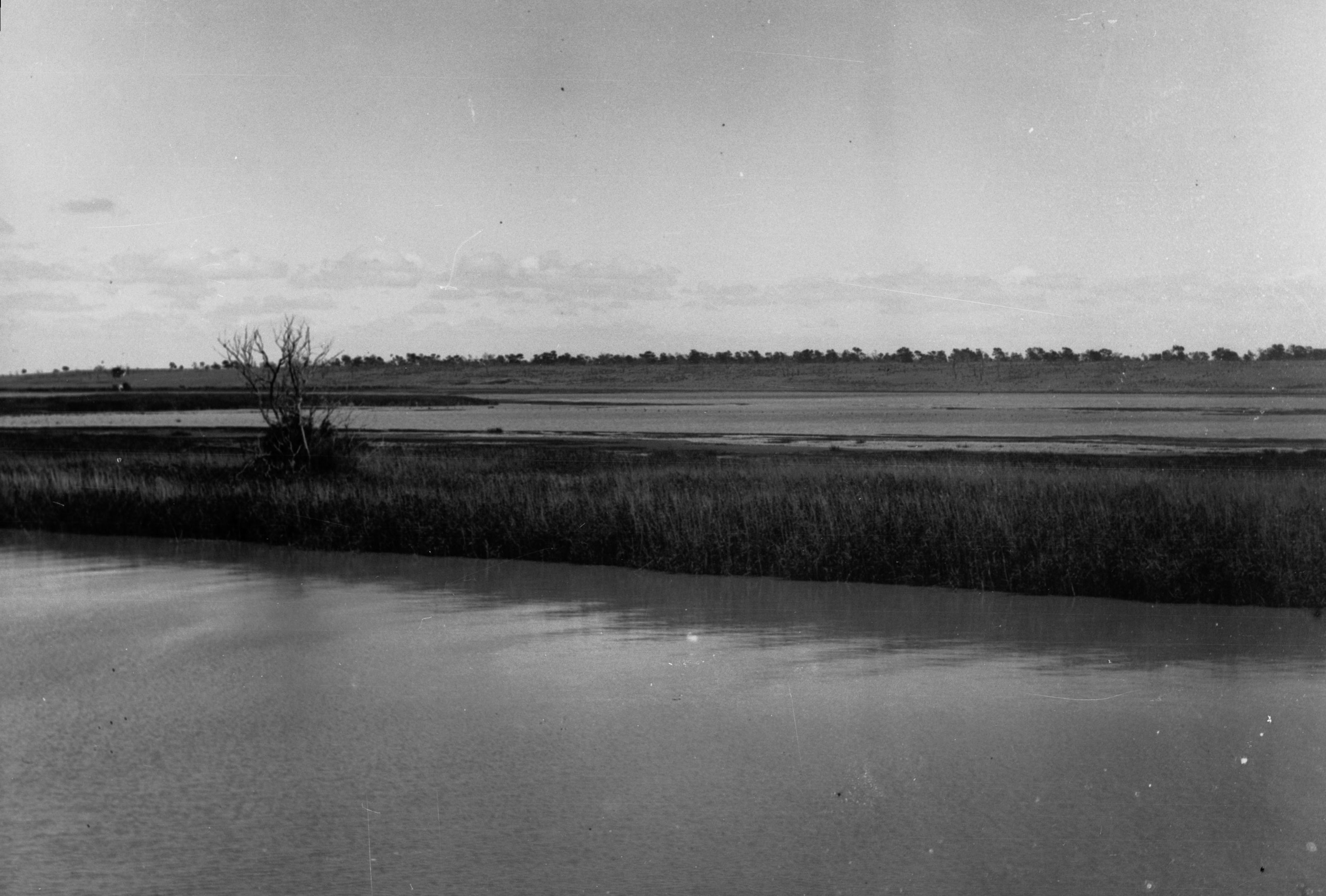
- Monteith Flat, ca. 1925

- Coordinates: 35.17°S 139.32°E
- Country: Australia
- State: South Australia
- LGA: Rural City of Murray Bridge
- Established: 1904

Government
  - State electorate: Hammond
  - Federal division: Barker

Population
  - Total: 104 (SAL 2021)
- Postcode: 5254
Localities around Monteith
Swanport	Long Flat	Murray Bridge East
Riverglen	Monteith	Kepa
	White Sands, Woods Point	Tailem Bend

Monteith is a rural locality inside a bend on the east (left) bank of the Murray River downstream (south) of Murray Bridge on the other bank. It is governed by the Rural City of Murray Bridge. The dominant industry on the river flats is dairy farming, while other agricultural activities take place further inland. Many of the farms are long and narrow along Bells Road, with irrigated land on the river side and elevated land on the other side of the road, including a dairy and farm house.

The locality of Monteith is traversed by the Princes Highway and bounded by the Adelaide-Melbourne railway line. The eastern end of the Swanport Bridge is at the northwestern corner of the locality.

The town of Monteith was surveyed in 1909, and formally named by Governor Day Bosanquet in 1910 after T. F. Monteith, an early pastoralist in the area.
