= Mulgundawa =

Mulgundawa South Australia
- Coordinates: 35.31°S 139.20°E
- Population: 41 (SAL 2021)
- Postcode(s): 5255
- LGA(s): Rural City of Murray Bridge
- State electorate(s): Hammond
- Federal division(s): Barker
Localities around Mulgundawa:
	Brinkley
Langhorne Creek	Mulgundawa	Wellington
	Lake Alexandrina	Nalpa

Mulgundawa is a locality in South Australia on the north coast of Lake Alexandrina between Langhorne Creek and Wellington. The current boundaries were set in 2000 for the long-established name, derived from the local Aboriginal name for the area.

Charles Johnston Knight arrived in South Australia from Scotland on the Arab in 1843. He settled at Mulgundawa in 1856 after marrying Sarah Donnon. By 1910 he had retired and his sons John and Joseph managed the property. The property was described in 1910 as mostly low-lying grassland with few trees.
