= Wellington Weir =

Proposed dam in Australia

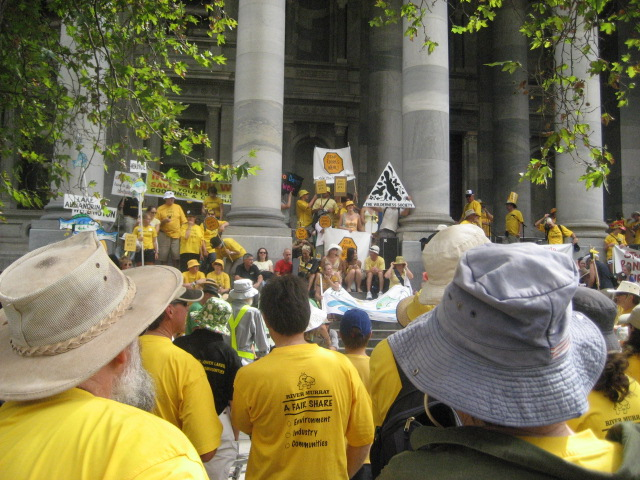
- A rally by "Stop The Weir" protesters on the steps of Parliament House, Adelaide

- Location of the proposed weir in South Australia
- Interactive map of Wellington Weir
- Country: Australia
- Location: Wellington, South Australia
- Coordinates: 35°21′45″S 139°22′14″E
- Purpose: Water supply
- Status: Proposed
- Construction cost: A$200 million (estimated)

Dam and spillways
- Type of dam: Weir (proposed)
- Impounds: River Murray

The Wellington Weir was a proposed weir across the River Murray, located several kilometres south of the town of Wellington, South Australia, immediately upstream from where the river enters Lake Alexandrina. Proposed in 2006 at a cost of A$200 million, by 2009 the project was abandoned, in part due to flooding rains and community opposition. Calls for the project were reignited less than a year later and have been ongoing.

The area that would have been impacted is subject to a Ramsar Agreement, as part of an international convention that aims to halt the loss of wetlands and conserve those that remain through wise use and management. The proposed weir is located on the traditional country of the Ngarrindjeri people.

== History ==
=== 2006 to 2009 ===
The Wellington Weir project was announced in 2006 by the Rann Government of South Australia. It was reported that at the 2006 Melbourne Cup, Rann secured agreement to the project by Prime Minister John Howard.

A proposed weir was suggested as an attempt to secure supply of potable water for Adelaide. The proposed weir would perform two roles: maintain a pool of water up-river that was sufficiently deep enough to allow continued use of the pumping station at Mannum during prolonged drought conditions; and reduce the flow of fresh water into Lake Alexandrina and Lake Albert, the latter that evaporates over 1,000 gigalitres (810,000 acre⋅ft) of water per year.

Much of the lower River Murray is controlled by a system of locks and weirs, including the Goolwa Barrages near the Murray Mouth, and Lock 1 at Blanchetown, 274 kilometres (170 mi) from the river mouth. The lowering of water levels in the lake system would severely impact on those who rely on the lakes and river for their livelihood and include irrigators, such as those in the Langhorne Creek wine region, farmers on the Narrung Peninsula and Point Sturt, and fisherpeople at Meningie and Clayton.

Opponents of the weir contended that the planned weir would severely damage the environment of the lakes and Coorong, and that already endangered species in the lakes and Coorong could become extinct. Others argued that the proposed weir diverted attention from the real issue: the sustainability of the Murray-Darling system. An environmental impact assessment was completed for a proposed temporary weir; and ruled out a permanent weir. The topic of over-allocation of water were significant in the debate regarding the cost of the proposed weir. Discussion included the prospect of buying water licences from irrigators that use water from the Murray River system to grow cotton in Queensland, as opposed to the costs of building the weir.

Environmental organisations, including the local River, Lakes and Coorong Action Group, opposed the weir. Various groups pointed out that the water held back by the proposed weir would be stagnant because "winds from the northwest to the south circulate oxygenated waters from the lakes up the river for many kilometres and winds from the north and northeast bring back freshened water benefiting both areas and precisely fitting in with our anti-clockwise wind rotation". Additionally there were widespread concerns about the release of toxic metals and acidity through the drying out of the acid sulphate soils that are widespread around the lakes.

Following assessment of the environment impact report, in July 2008 the Rann government officially dropped its support for the project. Despite this announcement and without approvals in place, less than a month later it was reported that preliminary works for the weir had commenced. The main reasons for the weir not proceeding were attributed to community pressure about the environmental damage caused by the proposed weir, especially tidal flows of seawater in the river mouth. The construction of the Port Stanvac desalination plant was also attributed as a reason for not proceeding.

Rains and subsequent floods in the upper Darling River in late 2009 and the upper Murray in April and May 2010, ended the Millennium Drought; and the need for a temporary weir.

=== Since 2010 ===
From mid-to-late 2010, there were renewed calls for the weir at Wellington, citing that the weir would improve environmental flows. However, in October 2010, Premier Rann stated that the weir will not proceed in the current parliamentary term.

In 2016, the Senate Select Committee on the Murray-Darling Basin Plan, in a detailed report on the Murray-Darling Basin, recommended further investigation into establishing a lock or other barrage at Wellington:

Recommendation 14: The committee recommends the government undertake cost-benefit analyses of the following options for adapting the management of the Lower Lakes and Coorong, and their social, economic and environmental impacts throughout the basin… investigating the construction of an additional lock at a location above Lake Alexandrina, such as near Wellington, SA, either in concert with the above options or as a single change.

— Senate Select Committee on the Murray-Darling Basin Plan, 2016

It was subsequently reported that NSW Senator David Leyonhjelm, chair of the Senate Select Committee, renewed calls to construct a weir at Wellington.

== See also ==
- List of reservoirs and dams in South Australia
