= Murray River road bridge, Murray Bridge =

Murray River Road Bridge
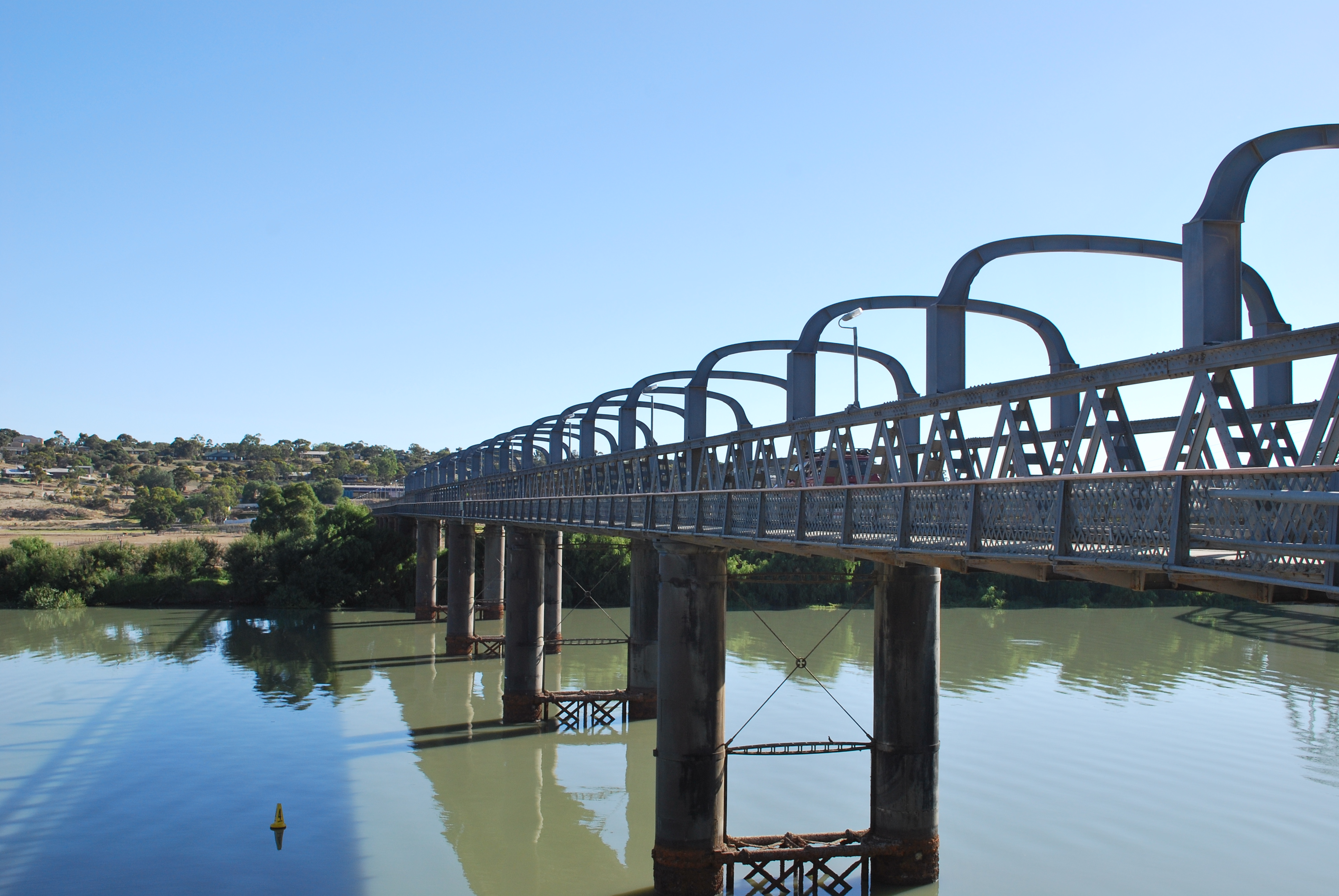
- Murray River Road Bridge in January 2010
- Coordinates: 35°06′56″S 139°16′48″E
- Carries: Adelaide-Wolseley railway line (until 1924)
- Crosses: Murray River
- Locale: Murray Bridge, South Australia
- Maintained by: Department for Infrastructure & Transport

Location
- Interactive map of Murray River Road Bridge

The Murray River Road Bridge is located in the town of Murray Bridge on the Murray River north of Lake Alexandra. The bridge was built as a road bridge in 1879 and converted for mixed road/rail use shortly thereafter when the Adelaide-Wolseley railway line opened. The tiny settlement of Edwards Crossing was renamed Murray Bridge when a new railway bridge was constructed in 1924. Since then, the bridge has been used for road traffic only.

== History ==
The bridge was built of iron between 1873 and 1879 and is 603.5 metres (1,980 ft) in length. It was used by trains for 40 years and during that time toll gates were installed to control other traffic across the bridge. The bridge became a shared road and rail bridge in 1886 and remained so until 1925 when a separate railway bridge was built.

The political history of the bridge extended through several sessions of Parliament starting in 1861 when a Committee of the House of Assembly recommended that if a suitable bridge could be erected at a cost not exceeding £20,000 the required amount should be included in the Estimates for the following session. The structure had to be specially adapted for the transit of cattle and sheep.

In 2023 McMahon Services completed a refurbishment of the bridge.

== Description ==
The height of the bridge was initially set at twenty feet (6.1 m) above the water, but in carrying out the work it was found necessary to increase it to thirty feet (9.1 m) in order to be clear of the funnels of the river steamers.

Superintendent, Mr. H. Parker, arrived from England in June 1874, with his apparatus and commenced the work of placing the remaining piers in position. To measure the depth, divers were sent through 50 feet (15 m) of water and 30 feet of river drift, making a total depth below water level of 80 feet (24 m), under which the divers worked. No.1 pier was taken down 70 feet (21 m); No. 2 pier, 92 feet (28 m); No. 3 pier, 118 feet (36 m); No. 4 pier, 110 feet (34 m); and No. 5 pier, 109 feet (33 m) below the underside of the main girders.

It was a work of some considerable difficulty and danger, and to estimate the cost with the insufficient data at hand was very hazardous. The bridge piers, now increased to five in number, were sunk thirty feet deeper and raised ten feet higher, to suit the steamers, than the section of the river sent to England in 1865 indicated.

The river spans were five in number, each being 114 feet 5 inches (34.87 m) in the clear, and constructed on the Warren principle. They were built by Messrs. Kennard Brothers, of the Crumlin Works, South Wales, and were a fine sample of first-class bridge work. The main girders are connected together laterally by cross girders, which were originally made on the lattice principle, but not being strong enough to sustain the weight of a railway train they were taken to pieces and reconstructed of plate and angle irons. The bridge is floored with Malletts buckle plates, upon which the asphalt and road metal is carried. The length of the structure over the river is 695 feet (212 m), the width of roadway being 11 feet (3.4 m), and of the foot ways, which are also asphalted, 3 feet 6 inches (1.07 m) inches.

The main girders rested on masonry bed-stones, which were supported by the cement concrete with which the cast-iron piers are filled, the piers in each instance having been sunk down to the bed-rock granite. They were composed of cast-iron cylinders seven feet in internal diameter, fitted together in segments, and bolted in lengths as they were lowered into the river bed; and after being tested with double the weight that they would be ever required to sustain, they were filled up with cement concrete. The great depth below the waterline to which these piers were sunk necessitated a much heavier description of bracing than that sent from England. The castings for these heavier braces, which were eighty-nine tons weight, were made by James Martin & Company of Gawler, and were fitted together at the bridge works, on a staging lowered into the water, and afterwards adjusted and fixed by the divers. So soon as the piers were filled up and the bed-stones set the girders, which had previously been put together on floating stages between the piers, were lowered on to the bed-plates by admitting water into the pontoons, which were then removed and moored in the next span, where the operation of building and fixing the girders was carried on, until all the spans were completed.

The eastern approach consisted of twenty-three spans of sixty feet each, making a total length of 1,380 feet (420 m). The piers consist of cast-iron cylinders in six-feet lengths, socketed together and sunk into the swamp to an average depth of about sixty feet. After being duly tested they were filled up with concrete and prepared to receive the main girders, which were constructed on the lattice principle and are made continuous; that is to say, every three spans represented a length of 179 feet 10 inches (54.81 m). The cross girders are constructed of plates and angle irons, and the floor, which was composed of buckle plates, were secured to the cross-girders by suitable bearers. The work of erecting the approach occupied about twelve months, the chief difficulty being the transit of the materials, about 2,560 tons, by sea and overland, and the sinking of the cylinders. The girders were lifted into position by a " Goliath" which was carried on rails throughout the whole length of the swamp.

== Droughts and flooding ==
The severe droughts of 1967 to 1968, 1981 to 1983, 1991 to 1995, and 2006 to 2011 (the Millennium drought) reduced the Murray River to a trickle.

However, the major floods of 1956 and 2011 had the water reaching new record heights. There have also been major floods in 1973 to 1974 and 2016. During 2020 and 2021 the river has been flowing strongly.
