= Murray Bridge North, South Australia =

Murray Bridge North
- Suburb
- Interactive map of Murray Bridge North
- Coordinates: 35.075°S 139.270°E
- Country: Australia
- State: South Australia
- City: Murray Bridge
- LGA: Rural City of Murray Bridge

Government
  - State electorate: Hammond
  - Federal division: Barker

Population
  - Total: 142 (SAL 2021)
- Postcode: 5253
Suburbs around Murray Bridge North
Pallamana	Pallamana; Mypolonga	Mypolonga
Pallamana	Murray Bridge North	Toora
Rocky Gully	Northern Heights	Toora; Mobilong

Murray Bridge North is a semi-rural satellite locality of Murray Bridge in South Australia east of the Murray River and northwest of the eponymous bridge. Its boundaries were formalised in March 2000 to cover a portion of land on either side of the main road to Mannum north of the main conurbation of Murray Bridge and west of the riverside industries of Mobilong and Toora.

== See also ==
- List of cities and towns in South Australia
