= Gifford Hill, South Australia =

Gifford Hill South Australia
- Coordinates: 35.165°S 139.223°E
- Population: 38 (SAL 2021)
- Postcode(s): 5253
- Area: 22.26 km^{2} (8.6 sq mi)
- LGA(s): Rural City of Murray Bridge
- State electorate(s): Hammond
- Federal division(s): Barker
Localities around Gifford Hill:
| Monarto South | White Hill | Murray Bridge |
| Monarto South | Gifford Hill | Murray Bridge South |
| Brinkley | Brinkley | Brinkley |

Gifford Hill is a semi-rural locality approximately 9 kilometres (5.6 mi) south west of the centre of Murray Bridge by road. It is named for the geographical feature of the same name which is thought to be named for South Australian pioneer, John Gifford.

In 2011, Gifford Hill was slated for urban development in a project called 'Gifford Hill - The Murray Bridge Equine and Village Development'. The project is a 50/50 joint venture between Burke Urban and the Murray Bridge Racing Club. As of November 2016, the first part of the development, a horse-racing track and equine facility, was set to be complete and ready for use by mid 2018. In October 2017 the completion date of the facility was pushed back and expected instead to be early 2019.

Gifford Hill is also the location of the transmitter hut and towers for local radio stations 5MU and Power FM.

== Geography ==
Gifford Hill, the geographical feature after which the locality is named, is the highest point of the Gifford Hills Range, which runs north, parallel to the Murray River on the western side of Murray Bridge, from Gifford Hill to Rocky Gully via White Hill and Kinchina Conservation Park.
