= Ben Dougall =

Australian cricketer

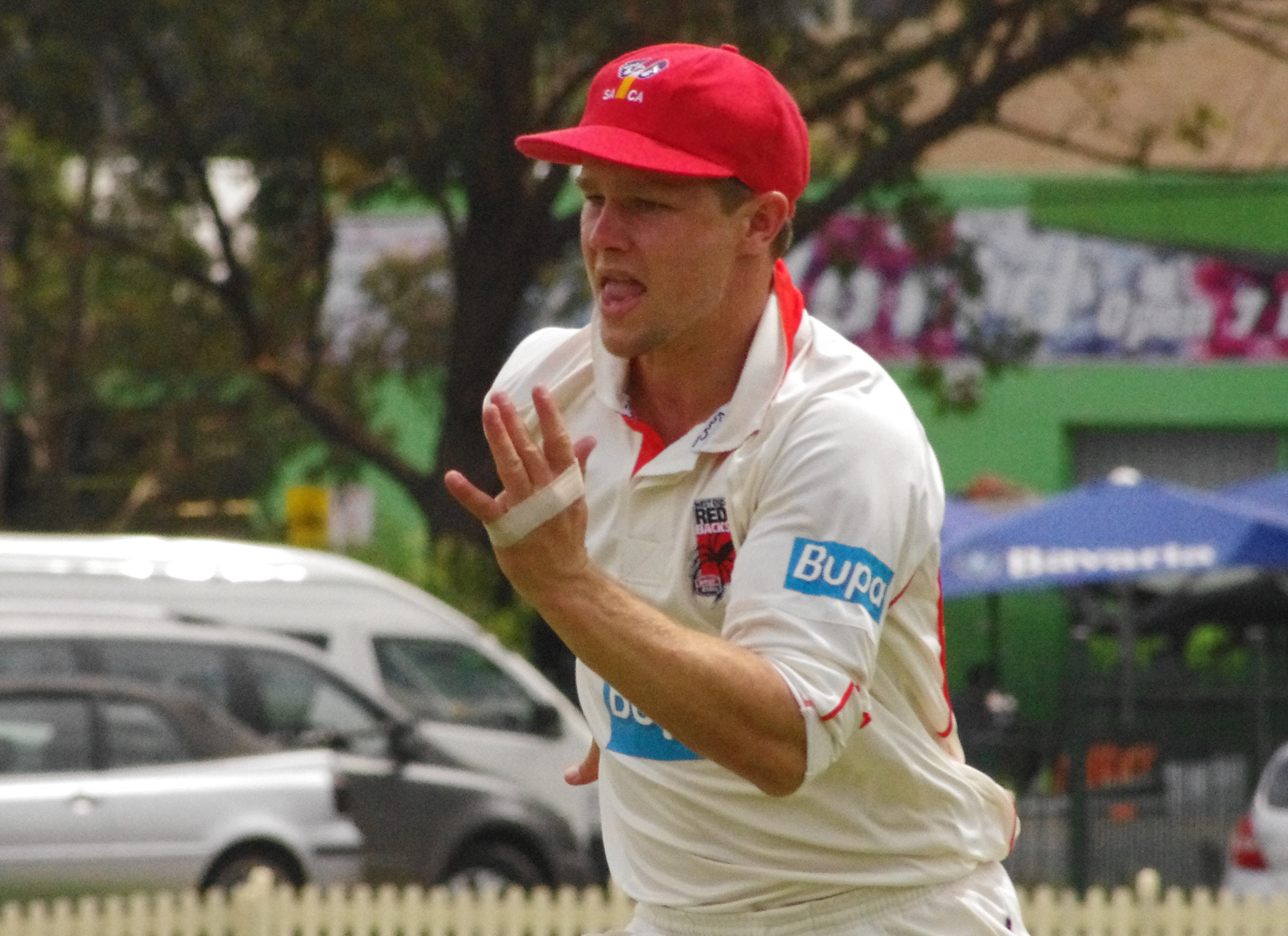

Personal information
- Full name: Benjamin Luke Dougall
- Born: 16 December 1991 (age 34); Murray Bridge, South Australia, Australia
- Batting: Left-handed
- Role: Batsman

Domestic team information
- Years: Team
- 2010/11–2011/12: South Australia
- FC debut: 6 November 2011 SA v NSW
- List A debut: 12 December 2010 SA v NSW

Career statistics
Competition	First-class	List A
Matches	2	3
Runs scored	46	30
Batting average	11.50	10.00
100s/50s	0/0	0/0
Top score	23	23
Catches/stumpings	0/0	0/0
- Source: Cricinfo, 11 September 2013

Benjamin Luke Dougall (born 16 December 1991) is an Australian cricketer who plays for South Australia.

Dougall currently plays as the professional for the Wanderers in the Ribblesdale League.

== See also ==
- List of South Australian representative cricketers
