= Northern Heights, South Australia =

Northern Heights South Australia
- Coordinates: 35.153°S 139.312°E
- Population: 305 (SAL 2021)
- Postcode(s): 5253
- LGA(s): Rural City of Murray Bridge
- State electorate(s): Hammond
- Federal division(s): Barker
Localities around Northern Heights:
Murray Bridge North	Murray Bridge North	Mobilong
Murray Bridge North	Northern Heights	Mobilong
Rocky Gully	Murray Bridge	Murray Bridge
- Footnotes: Coordinates

Northern Heights is a suburban satellite locality of Murray Bridge in South Australia. Being set approximately 900 metres (3,000 ft) back from the west bank of the Murray River, the locality occupies higher ground immediately west of the Preamimma Creek, which separates it from Mobilong Swamp. The crest of Paradise Hill (formerly Hungry Hill) is at the northwestern corner of the locality.

== See also ==
- List of cities and towns in South Australia
