= Lavender Federation Trail =

Hiking trail in South Australia

- Length: 325 km (202 mi)
- Location: Mount Lofty Ranges, South Australia
- Established: 2000
- Trailheads: Murray Bridge, South Australia; Clare, South Australia
- Use: Hiking
- Difficulty: medium
- Season: avoid summer
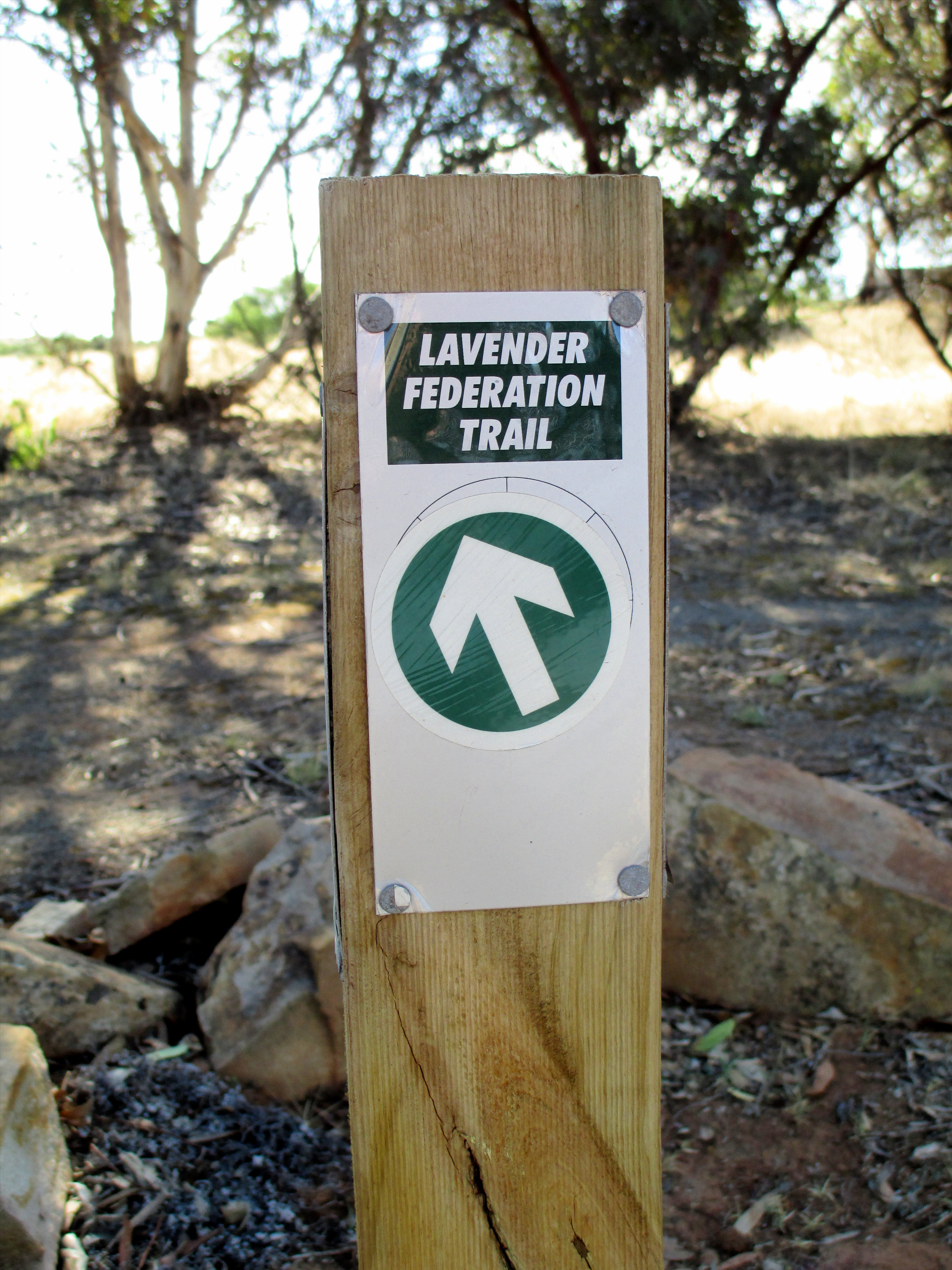
- Waymark: Trail marker at Dutton
- Sights: Mount Beevor; Barossa Ranges
- Hazards: washouts, bushfire
- Surface: mainly natural
- Website: https://lavenderfederationtrail.au/

The Lavender Federation Trail is a long distance walking trail in the eastern Mount Lofty Ranges in South Australia. It extends 325 kilometres (202 mi) from Murray Bridge to Clare. It is named after Terry Lavender OAM and development started in 1999.

== Route ==
The trail starts at Sturt Reserve by the Murray River in Murray Bridge. It climbs out of Murray Bridge through Rocky Gully and Kinchina Conservation Park, and passes Monarto Safari Park. The trail crosses the ridge with views over the Bremer River valley, and up to the summit of Mount Beevor (503m). The trail continues north along the eastern Mount Lofty Ranges through the Eden Valley wine region to Truro. The next section continues north to Eudunda, South Australia. It was extended to Manoora in 2017. The trail was completed to Clare with a grand opening on 5 May 2018.

There are several loops off of the main trail, including:

- Tungkillo Loop Trail
- Eden Valley Loop Trail – 18 km
- Springton Loop Trail – 17 km
- Moculta Loop Trail – 10.5 km
- Moculta–Truro Spur – 9 km
- Truro Spur Trail – 5 km
- Point Pass Loop Trail – 14 km
- Robertstown Link Trail – 7.5 km

== Geology and biology ==
The trail passes through wetlands near the Murray River, rocky gullies up the eastern slopes of the ranges, past the ruins of former farmhouses and copper mines. There are native plants, grain crops, and grape vines then more crops and grazing land.

== History ==
The first section of the trail from Murray Bridge to Mount Beevor near Harrogate opened in 2000. Stage 4 opened in 2014 from Truro to Eudunda. The trail has been progressively extended northwards through Tungkillo, Springton, Eden Valley, Keyneton, Moculta, Truro, Dutton, Eudunda, Waterloo, Manoora to Clare, The final stage opened on 5 May 2018.

== See also ==
- Kinchina Conservation Park
- List of long-distance hiking tracks in Australia
