= Riverglen =

- Town
- Coordinates: 35.1700°S 139.3085°E
- Country: Australia
- State: South Australia
- LGA: Rural City of Murray Bridge
- Location: 7 km (4.3 mi) south of Murray Bridge

Government
  - State electorate: Hammond
  - Federal division: Barker

Population
  - Total: 19 (SAL 2021)
- Postcode: 5253
Localities around Riverglen
Murray Bridge South	Swanport	Monteith
Murray Bridge South	Riverglen	Monteith
Brinkley	White Sands	White Sands

Riverglen is a satellite locality of Murray Bridge in South Australia, located on the west bank of the Murray River. It sits adjacent to Swanport and overlooks the east bank locality of Monteith. The locality was named after the Riverglen Irrigation Area in March 2000.

== See also ==
- List of cities and towns in South Australia
