= Swanport =

- Town
- Coordinates: 35.153°S 139.312°E
- Country: Australia
- State: South Australia
- LGA: Rural City of Murray Bridge

Government
  - State electorate: Hammond
  - Federal division: Barker

Population
  - Total: 157 (SAL 2021)
- Postcode: 5253
Localities around Swanport
Murray Bridge	Murray Bridge	Long Flat
Murray Bridge South	Swanport	Monteith
Murray Bridge South	Riverglen	Monteith

Swanport, formerly known as Thompson's Crossing and Thomson's Landing, is a suburban satellite locality of Murray Bridge in South Australia. It is located on the west (right) bank of the Murray River, adjacent to Swanport Bridge. Its boundaries were formalised in March 2000 to cover a portion of semi-urban land immediately south of the South Eastern Freeway adjacent to the Swanport Bridge, which is the main road freight route over the Murray. It is named for the docking place on the west bank of the Murray which was home to "numerous swans" and also known as Thomson's Landing.

Before British colonisation, the area around Swanport was home to a significant population of Ngarrindjeri people. In 1911, a large Ngarrindjeri burial ground containing the remains of over a hundred people was unearthed during land reclamation operations at Swanport. Most of the bones were subsequently transported to the Adelaide Museum.

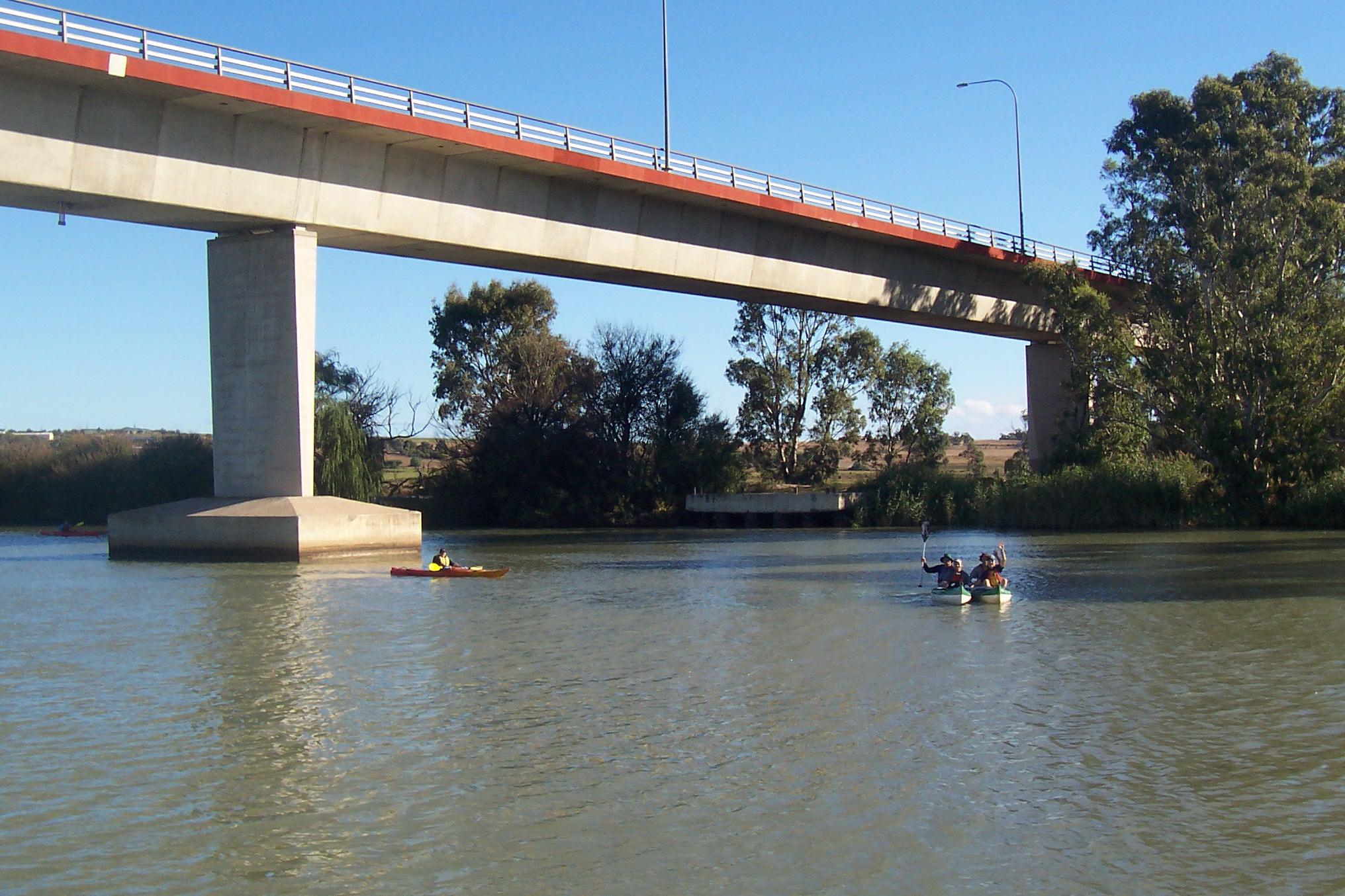
Swanport Bridge at the northern edge of the locality

== See also ==
- List of cities and towns in South Australia
