= Rural City of Murray Bridge =

- Local government area
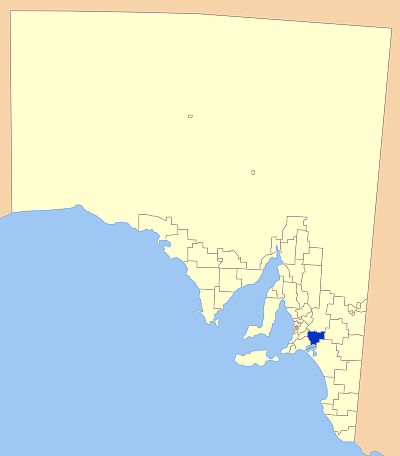
- The location of the Rural City of Murray Bridge in SA

- Interactive map of Rural City of Murray Bridge
- Coordinates: 35.1186°S 139.2838°E
- Country: Australia
- State: South Australia
- Region: Murray and Mallee
- Established: 1977
- Council seat: Murray Bridge

Government
  - Mayor: Wayne Thorley
  - State electorate: Kavel; Hammond
  - Federal division: Barker

Area
  - Total: 1,832 km^{2} (707 sq mi)

Population
  - Total: 21,644 (2021 census)
  - Density: 11.83/km^{2} (30.6/sq mi)
- Website: Rural City of Murray Bridge
LGAs around Rural City of Murray Bridge
| Mid Murray | Mid Murray | Karoonda East Murray |
| Mount Barker | Rural City of Murray Bridge | Karoonda East Murray |
| Alexandrina | Coorong | Coorong |

The Rural City of Murray Bridge is a local government area of South Australia, centred on the regional city of Murray Bridge and stretching south to Lake Alexandrina.

== History ==
It was established in 1977 as the District Council of Murray Bridge, with the amalgamation of the Corporate Town of Murray Bridge and the surrounding District Council of Mobilong. It was renamed the Rural City of Murray Bridge, when it gained city status in January 1993.

== Towns ==
It includes the surrounding towns and localities of:

Avoca Dell, Brinkley, Chapman Bore, East Wellington, Ettrick, Gifford Hill, Greenbanks, Jervois, Kepa, Long Flat, Mobilong, Monarto, Monarto South, Monteith, Mulgundawa, Murrawong, Murray Bridge East, Murray Bridge North, Murray Bridge South, Mypolonga, Nalpa, Northern Heights, Pallamana, Riverglades, Riverglen, Rocky Gully, Sunnyside, Swanport, Toora, Wellington, White Hill, White Sands, Willow Banks, Woodlane and Woods Point, and parts of Burdett, Callington, Caloote, Naturi, Rockleigh, Tepko, Tolderol, Wall Flat and Lake Alexandrina.

== Councillors ==
The Rural City of Murray Bridge has a directly-elected mayor. The current elected councillors as of November 2022 are as follows:

| Ward | Councillor | Notes |
|---|---|---|
| Mayor | Wayne Thorley | |
| Unsubdivided | Andrew Baltensperger | |
| Unsubdivided | Tom Haig | |
| Unsubdivided | Karen Eckermann | |
| Unsubdivided | Fred Toogood | |
| Unsubdivided | Mat O'Brien | |
| Unsubdivided | Airlie Keen | |
| Unsubdivided | John DeMichele | |
| Unsubdivided | Clem Schubert | |
| Unsubdivided | Lisa Courtney | |
