= Chuo University Suginami High School =

High school in Tokyo, Japan owned by Chuo University

Coordinates: 35°42′59″N 139°36′29″E

- Chuo, Tokyo; Japan

Information
- Type: High school

Chuo University Suginami High School (Japanese: 中央大学杉並高等学校) is a high school in Tokyo, Japan. It is overseen by Chuo University, a university that focuses on law.

== History ==
Chuo Suginami was established by Chuo University as a feeder school. The first principal, Suzuki Takashi, a literature professor, opened the school in early 1963. In 1975, a new classroom building, gymnasium and administration building were built. Originally an all-boys school, Chuo Suginami shifted to a mixed gender system in 1990, and classes had integrated genders by 1992.

As of 2025, the school enrolled approximately 1000 students in total, with 90% of the students going on to enroll at Chuo University after graduation.

== Sister School ==
Beginning in July 2002, as part of a plan to teach Cross Cultural Sensitivity to students and allow them to experience a unique culture that they would otherwise not have the chance to, Chuo Suginami and Unity College, Murray Bridge, Australia, have been involved in a biannual student exchange program. In July 2002, the 16 Chuo Suginami students involved in the first exchange visited Australian landmarks such as Kangaroo Island and were the guests of honour at a welcoming ceremony held by Unity College. The Unity students went on their first exchange to Chuo Suginami in December 2003. During this visit, the then-principal, Neville Grieger, gave an address in Japanese to the school at a welcoming ceremony. One year later, Chuo Suginami and Unity College officially became sister schools.

At the beginning of each exchange, gifts are given by each school. Some of these gifts given by Unity include local produce such as a photograph of the Murray River, handmade items and other things unique to the area. Gifts given by Chuo Suginami include a mirror, calligraphy set and a hand-painted bowl. This is an example of the culture students on the exchange exhibit, as gift giving is customary in Japanese society.

The school's goal is to continue student exchanges with Chuo Suginami and maintain a strong bond with them, as well as to encourage students to go to Japan for longer periods of time and continue to improve their Japanese language skills.

== Alumni ==
- Jirō Asada, novelist (graduated 1970)
- Yoshihide Muroya, aerobatics pilot
- Yuumi Koseki, former member of SGO48

== See also ==
- Unity College, Murray Bridge, part of an exchange program with Chuo University Suginami High School
