= White Sands, South Australia =

White Sands South Australia
- Coordinates: 35.1957°S 139.3198°E
- Population: 194 (SAL 2021)
- Postcode(s): 5253
- Location: 10 km (6 mi) south of Murray Bridge
- LGA(s): Rural City of Murray Bridge
- State electorate(s): Hammond
- Federal division(s): Barker
Localities around White Sands:
| Murray Bridge South | Riverglen | Monteith |
| Brinkley | White Sands | Woods Point |
| Brinkley | Brinkley | Woods Point |
- Footnotes: Coordinates

White Sands is a satellite locality of Murray Bridge in South Australia on the west bank of the Murray River adjacent to Riverglen and overlooking the east bank locality of Monteith. The locality was named after the White Sands Ski Resort, a water skiing and wakeboarding facility, in March 2000.

== See also ==
- List of cities and towns in South Australia
