= Long Island Recreation Park =

Protected area in South Australia

- IUCN category III (natural monument or feature)
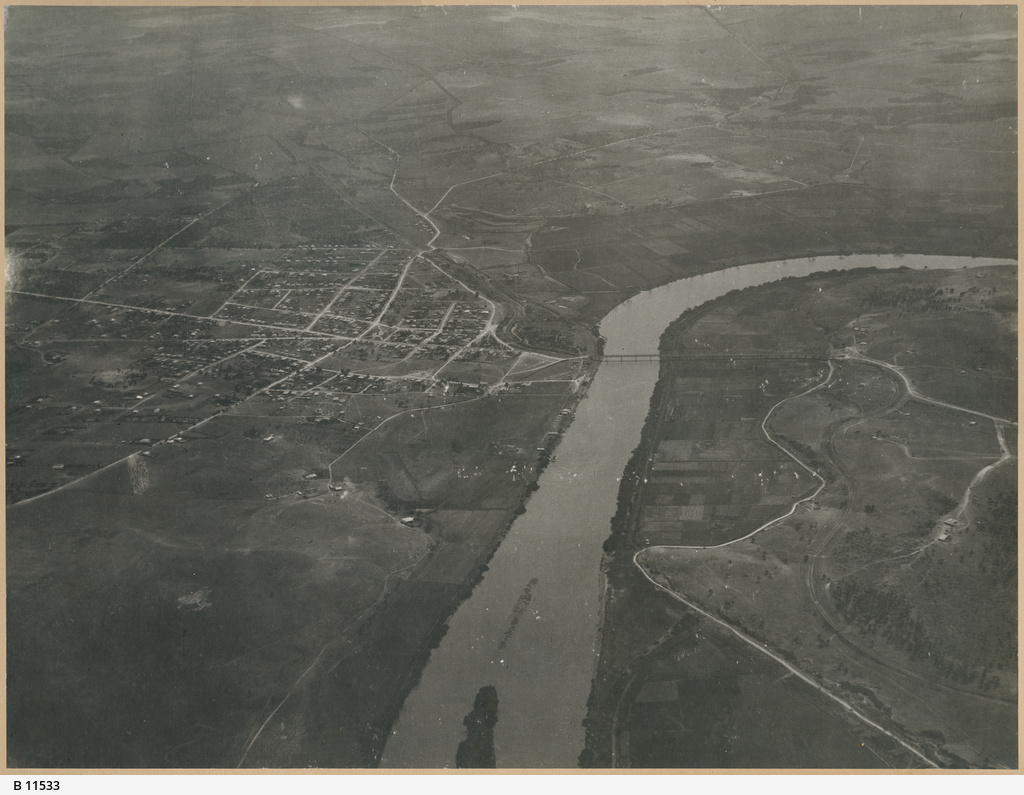
- Aerial view of Murray Bridge including north end of Long Island, circa 1920 (State Library of South Australia B 11533)

- Location within South Australia
- Location: South Australia
- Nearest city: Murray Bridge
- Coordinates: 35°7′49.44″S 139°18′1.07″E
- Area: 8 ha (20 acres)
- Established: 9 October 1958
- Governing body: Department for Environment and Water

Long Island Recreation Park is a protected area in the Australian state of South Australia occupying the full extent of Long Island in the Murray River immediately east of the city of Murray Bridge.

The island forming the recreation park first received protected area status on 9 October 1958 as a recreation reserve proclaimed under Crown Lands Act 1929 and to be managed by the Corporate Town of Murray Bridge. On 1 September 1966, it was proclaimed as a fauna sanctuary under the Fauna Conservation Act, 1964-1965. On 8 July 1976, the recreation reserve was resumed under Crown Lands Act 1929 and then proclaimed as the Long Island Recreation Park under the National Parks and Wildlife Act 1972.

As of 1980, it was reported as having "aesthetic and recreational value", as being a refuge for waterfowl and as supporting "a dense forest of introduced willow species with emergent Eucalyptus camaldulensis".

The recreation park is classified as an IUCN Category III protected area. In 1980, the recreation park was listed on the former Register of the National Estate.

== See also ==
- List of islands within the Murray River in South Australia
