= Swanport Bridge =

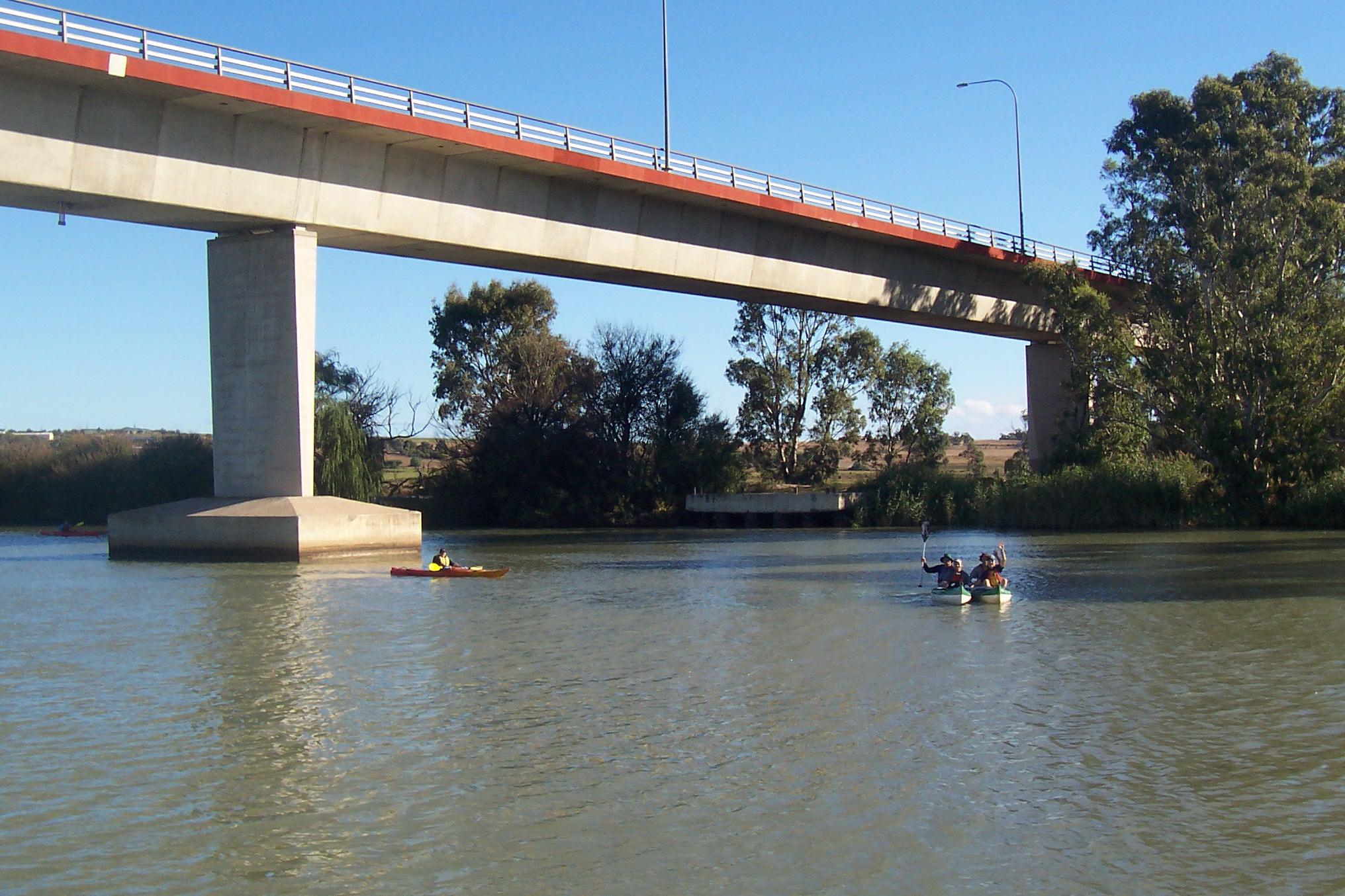
- Coordinates: 35°08′51″S 139°18′32″E
- Carries: Highway 1 (Cars and trucks up to B-double)
- Crosses: Murray River
- Locale: Murray Bridge, South Australia
- Official name: Swanport Bridge
- Named for: Swanport
- Owner: Government of South Australia
- Maintained by: DPTI
- Preceded by: Murray Bridge town bridge
- Followed by: Tailem Bend–Jervois ferry

Characteristics
- Material: Prestressed concrete
- Total length: 1 kilometre (0.62 mi)
- Width: 2 lanes

History
- Opened: 30 May 1979

Location
- Interactive map of Swanport Bridge

Swanport Bridge is a road bridge that carries Highway 1 across the Murray River, located approximately 4 kilometres (2.5 mi) southeast of the town of Murray Bridge in South Australia, Australia. Opened on 30 May 1979 by transport minister Geoff Virgo, the bridge connects the communities of Murray Bridge and Tailem Bend.

== Characteristics ==
The bridge itself is 1 kilometre (0.62 mi) in length with two lanes, one for each direction of traffic, and no separating median. It is constructed from prestressed concrete. There is a footpath on the northern side, with no barrier from the roadway, signposted as being for emergency use only.

The bridge serves as a link between the South Eastern Freeway to the west and the Princes Highway continuing to the east, and as such is an integral part of the Adelaide–Melbourne road transport corridor. Both the South Eastern Freeway to the west of the bridge and the Princes Highway to its east are two lanes each way with a wide median and speed limit of 110 kilometres per hour (68 mph). The bridge itself is only one lane each way with no median strip and has a speed limit of 80 kilometres per hour (50 mph) since 2015.
