= McMahon Services =

- Company type: Private company
- Industry: Construction; Demolition
- Founded: 1959
- Founders: Glen McMahon
- Headquarters: Adelaide, Australia
- Owner: Andrew McMahon; David McMahon
- Number of employees: 700 (2019)
- Subsidiaries: Asurco Contracting
- Website: www.mcmservices.com.au

McMahon Services is an Australian construction and demolition company. Founded in 1959, it is based in Adelaide.

== History ==
McMahon Services was founded in Adelaide in 1959 by Glen McMahon as a demolition company. In 1990, sons Andrew and David took over the management and the company diversified into construction. It is contracted by governments and private industry for construction and demolition projects in most states of Australia.

McMahon Services is one of 12 Class A asbestos removal licence holders (licensed to remove friable asbestos or asbestos-contaminated dust) in South Australia and claims to be Australia's largest asbestos services provider.

In September 2020, McMahon purchased Asurco Contracting.

== Legal issues ==
In 2004, the Federal Court of Australia imposed penalties totalling more than A$535,000 on McMahon Services, SA Demolition & Salvage, D&V Services and several company representatives following proceedings brought by the Australian Competition and Consumer Commission (ACCC) over collusive tendering practices. The case concerned a Defence Department demolition and asbestos-removal contract at the Salisbury site in South Australia, valued at approximately A$2.4 million. McMahon Services was fined A$300,000, while its operations demolition manager, Phillip Bubner, was fined A$35,000.

== Notable projects ==
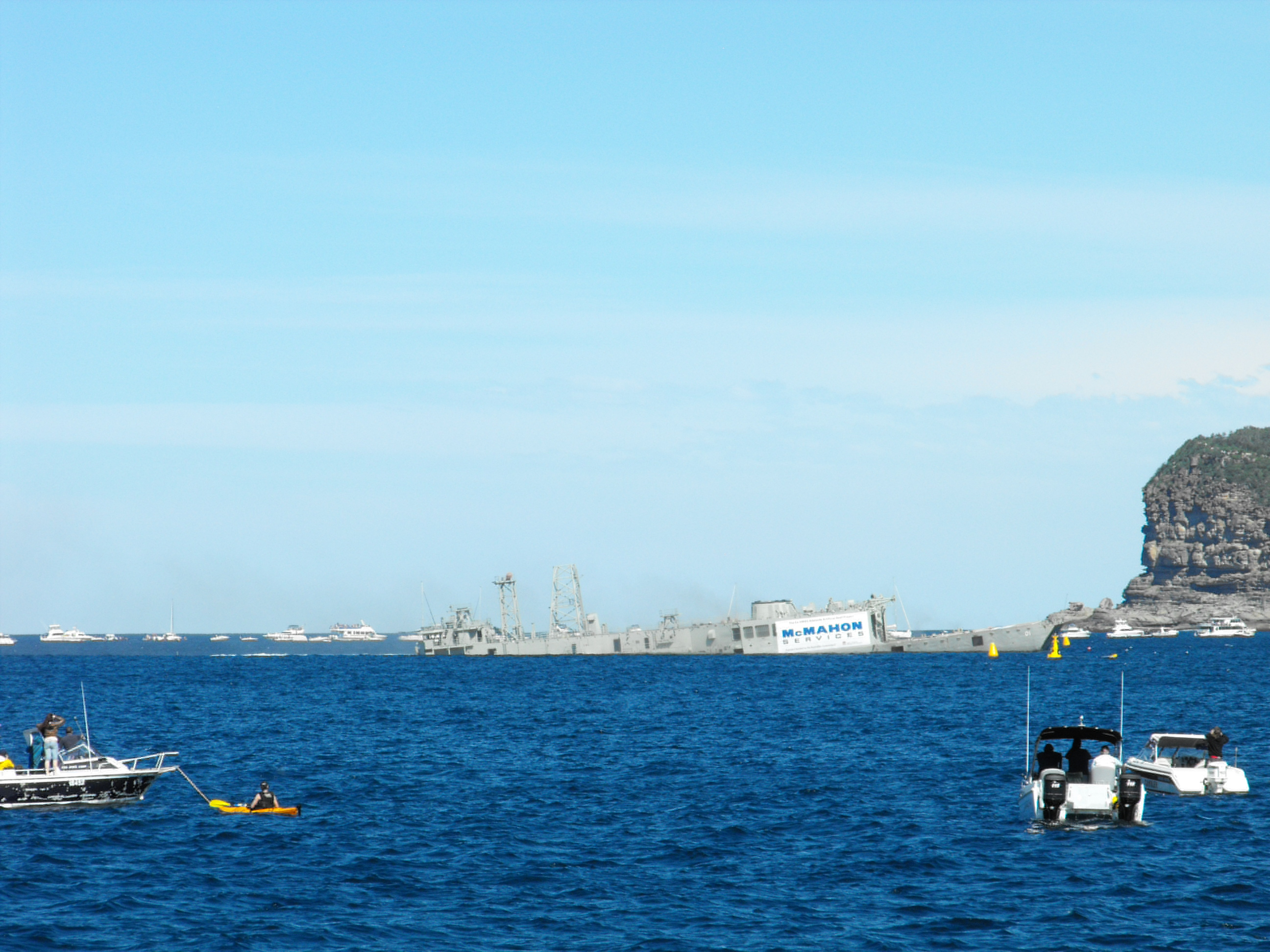
HMAS Adelaide being scuttled off Avoca Beach in April 2011

- Birkenhead Bridge deck replacement
- HMAS Adelaide scuttling
- HMAS Success scrapping
- Kwinana Power Station demolition
- Murray River road bridge, Murray Bridge refurbishment
- Northern Connector
- Northern Power Station demolition
- Royal Adelaide Hospital demolition
- Whyalla Airport terminal upgrade
