= Mobilong, South Australia =

Mobilong South Australia
- Coordinates: 35.100°S 139.277°E
- Population: 7 (SAL 2021)
- Postcode(s): 5253
- LGA(s): Rural City of Murray Bridge
- State electorate(s): Hammond
- Federal division(s): Barker
Localities around Mobilong:
Murray Bridge North	Murray Bridge North	Toora
Northern Heights	Mobilong	Riverglades
Murray Bridge	Murray Bridge	Murray Bridge East
- Footnotes: Coordinates

Mobilong is a suburb of Murray Bridge in South Australia, on the west bank of the Murray River. Its boundaries were formalised in March 2000 to cover a portion of land adjacently north of the Murray Bridge city centre and including the Mobilong Swamp and Murray Bridge Irrigation Area.

Mobilong was the original name for the early settlement of Murray Bridge itself. The present-day locality, however, was specifically named after Mobilong Swamp in 2000. According to South Australian historian Geoffrey Manning, the word Mobilong is a corruption of the Aboriginal term mupulawangk, meaning "soft reed place" as "reeds along the [Murray] river bank were used in the making of coiled baskets." The word appears to have first been used officially in the vicinity to name the cadastral division, the Hundred of Mobilong, in 1860.

Despite its name, the Mobilong Prison is not in the locality of Mobilong, but in the northwestern corner of the locality of Murray Bridge, adjoining Rocky Gully.

== See also ==
- Hundred of Mobilong
- List of cities and towns in South Australia
