= Jervois, South Australia =

Jervois South Australia
- Coordinates: 35°15′34″S 139°26′17″E
- Population: 258 (SAL 2021)
- Postcode(s): 5259
- Location: 99 km (62 mi) SE of Adelaide; 27 km (17 mi) SE of Murray Bridge; 3 km (2 mi) W of Tailem Bend
- LGA(s): Rural City of Murray Bridge
- State electorate(s): Hammond
- Federal division(s): Barker
Localities around Jervois:
	Woods Point
Brinkley	Jervois	Tailem Bend
Wellington	Wellington East

Jervois is a town in South Australia, on the right (western) bank of the lower Murray River. Jervois is predominantly a farming community, especially dairy farming on the floodplain and gently rising ground behind it.

Jervois is located in the Rural City of Murray Bridge local government area, 99 kilometres (62 mi) southeast of the state capital, Adelaide and on the opposite bank of the Murray from Tailem Bend, with a cable ferry carrying vehicles across the river between the two towns. In contrast to Jervois, Tailem Bend is high on cliffs above the left bank of the river. Jervois was surveyed in 1927 and named after the governor of South Australia, William Jervois.

== See also ==
- List of cities and towns in South Australia
- List of crossings of the Murray River
