= Murray Bridge, South Australia =

Murray Bridge Pomberuk
- City
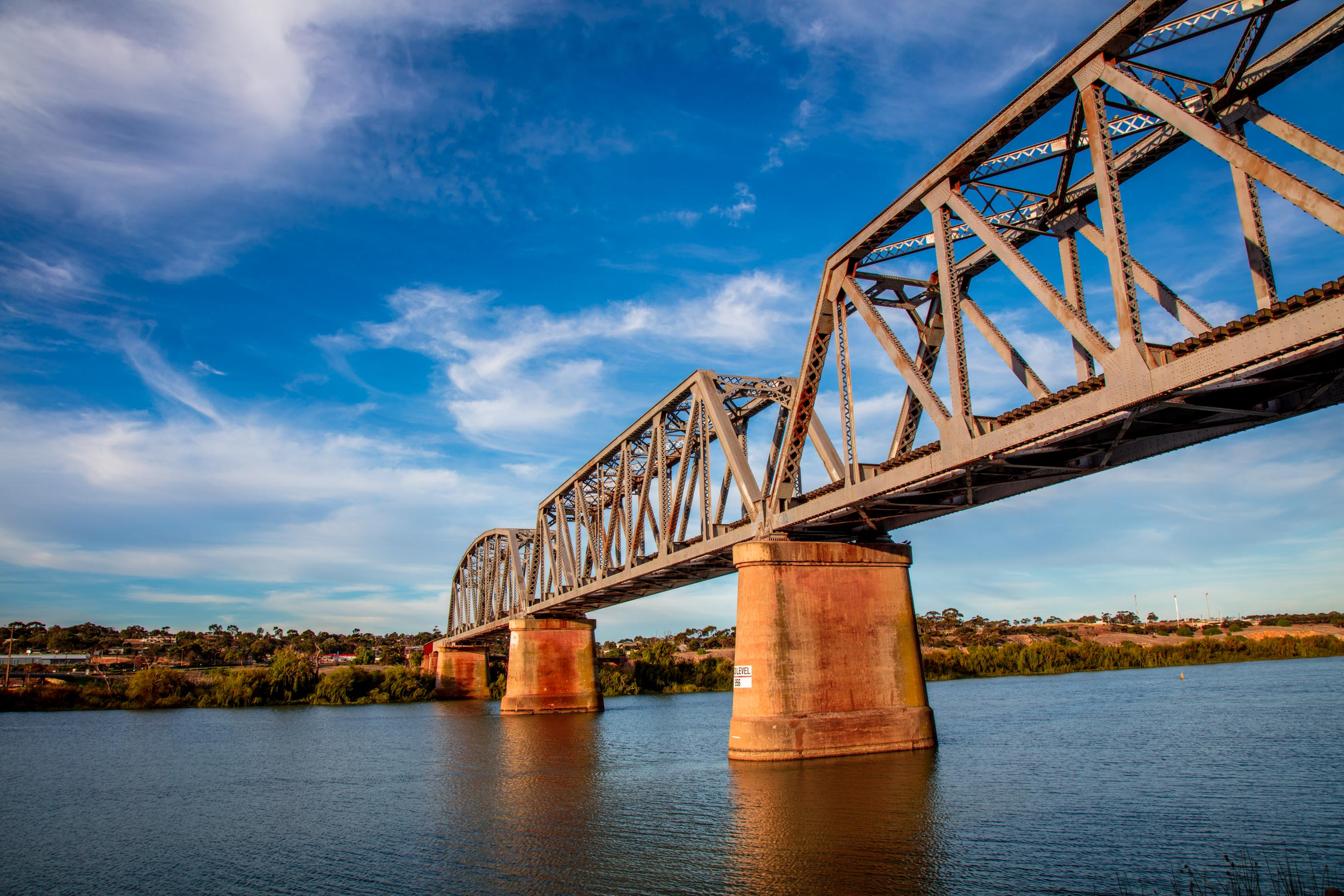
- Murray River road bridge

- Coordinates: 35.117°S 139.267°E
- Country: Australia
- State: South Australia
- LGA: Rural City of Murray Bridge
- Location: 78 km (48 mi) ESE of Adelaide
- Established: 1924

Government
  - State electorate: Hammond
  - Federal division: Barker

Area (2011 urban)
  - Total: 97.5 km^{2} (37.6 sq mi)

Population
  - Total: 17,457 (UCL 2021)
- Time zone: UTC+9:30 (ACST)
  - Summer (DST): UTC+10:30 (ACDT)
- Postcode: 5253
Localities around Murray Bridge
Pallamana; Rocky Gully	Murray Bridge North; Northern Heights; Mobilong	Riverglades; Murray Bridge East
White Hill; Rocky Gully	Murray Bridge	Long Flat
Gifford Hill	Swanport; Murray Bridge South	Monteith

Murray Bridge (formerly Mobilong and Edwards Crossing; Ngarrindjeri: Pomberuk) is a city in the Australian state of South Australia, located 78 kilometres (48 mi) east-southeast of the state's capital city, Adelaide, and 77 kilometres (48 mi) north of the town of Meningie.

The city is called Pomberuk by the traditional owners of the land, the Ngarrindjeri people. It was later known as Mobilong and later as Edwards Crossing, before being renamed as Murray Bridge in 1924, deriving its name from the then Murray River road/rail bridge crossing over the Murray River. The city is situated on the Princes Highway, the main road transport link between Adelaide and Melbourne.

The city services a farming area including dairy, pigs, chickens, cereal crops and vegetables.

== History ==
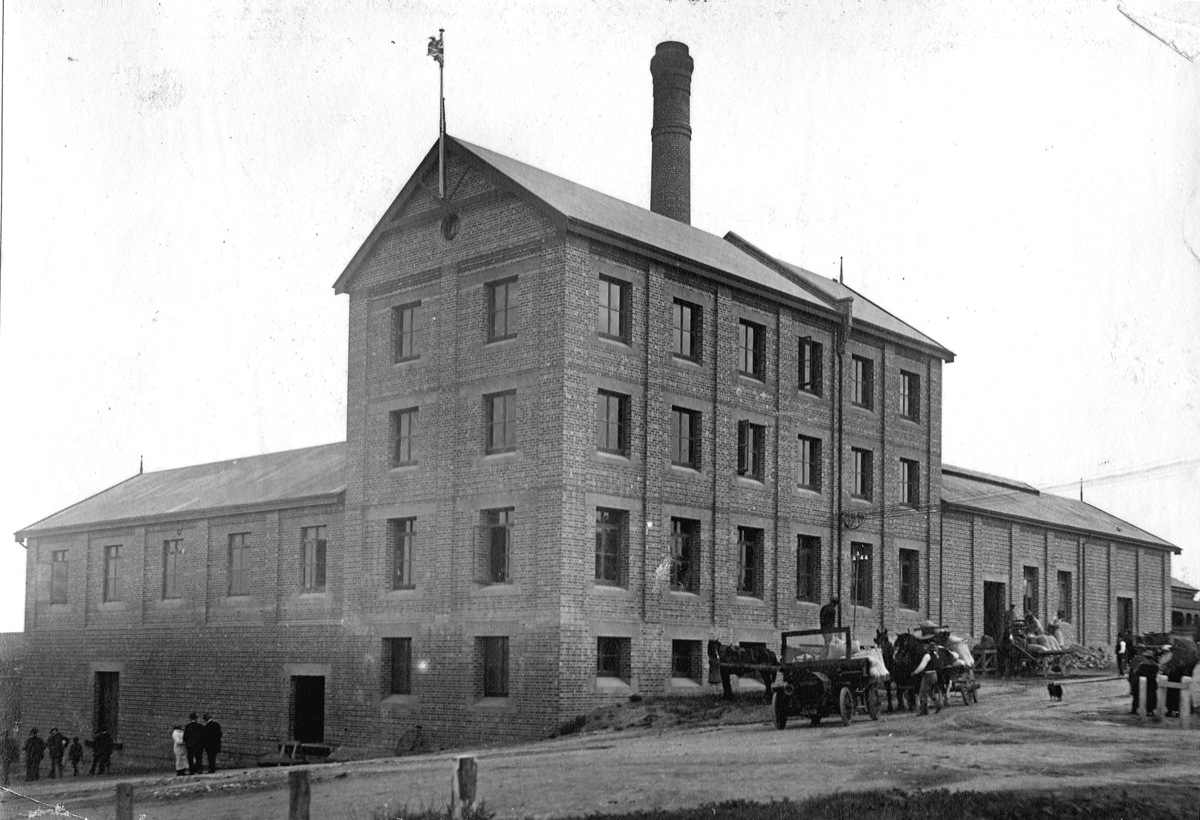
Flour mill at Murray Bridge East, 1920

Murray Bridge is in the traditional lands of the Ngarrindjeri people, who refer to Murray Bridge as Pomberuk. The first European explorer was Charles Sturt, who camped there on 8 February 1830.

The first road bridge across the lower Murray was known as The Murray Bridge and completed at Edwards's Crossing in 1879. To distinguish this bridge from the many other bridges that cross the Murray River, it is known as the Murray River road bridge, Murray Bridge. The bridge became a shared road and rail bridge in 1886 until the separate rail bridge was completed in 1925. The bridge was designed for 1,067 mm (3 ft 6 in) rail track gauge though in actuality, only 1,600 mm (5 ft 3 in) gauge trains ever used it.

The District Council of Mobilong was established in 1884, bringing local government to the township, then known as Mobilong, and the surrounding land within the Hundred of Mobilong. By 1923, the council had absorbed the southern two-thirds of the neighbouring Hundred of Burdett across the river, the Hundred of Ettrick further east, and part of the Hundred of Brinkley to the south. The Mobilong township by then had its own ward. The township seceded from Mobilong council in 1924, calling itself the Corporate Town of Murray Bridge, effectively renaming the township.

In 1920, there was a picture theatre in Murray Bridge known as the Lyric Theatre, leased by Dan Clifford Theatres. At that time, audiences were dwindling owing to only silent films being able to be shown, but there were plans to upgrade to enable screening of "talkies".

In 1977 the two local councils recombined as the District Council of Murray Bridge.

In 1979 the Swanport Bridge, carrying the South Eastern Freeway across the Murray River was completed 5 kilometres (3 mi) downstream, removing most through traffic from the historic road and rail bridge.

In 1993 the local municipal council crossed a population threshold, enabling it to be declared a city, the Rural City of Murray Bridge. The bounded locality of Murray Bridge remained the majority population centre and seat of the city council.

Murray Bridge contains a number of heritage-listed sites, including the Murray Bridge Transport Precinct, listed on the South Australian Heritage Register.

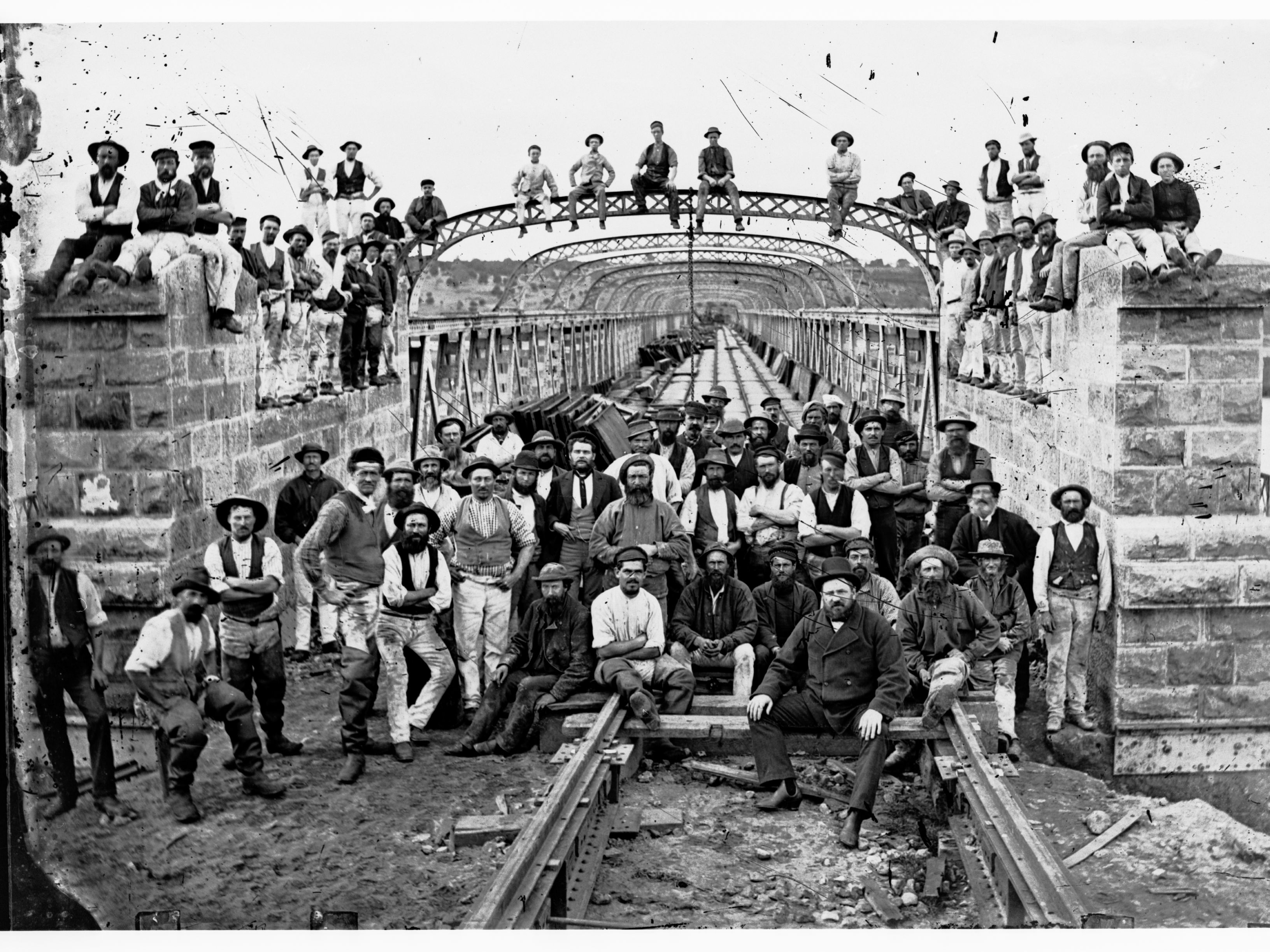
Workers on the first bridge, 1883

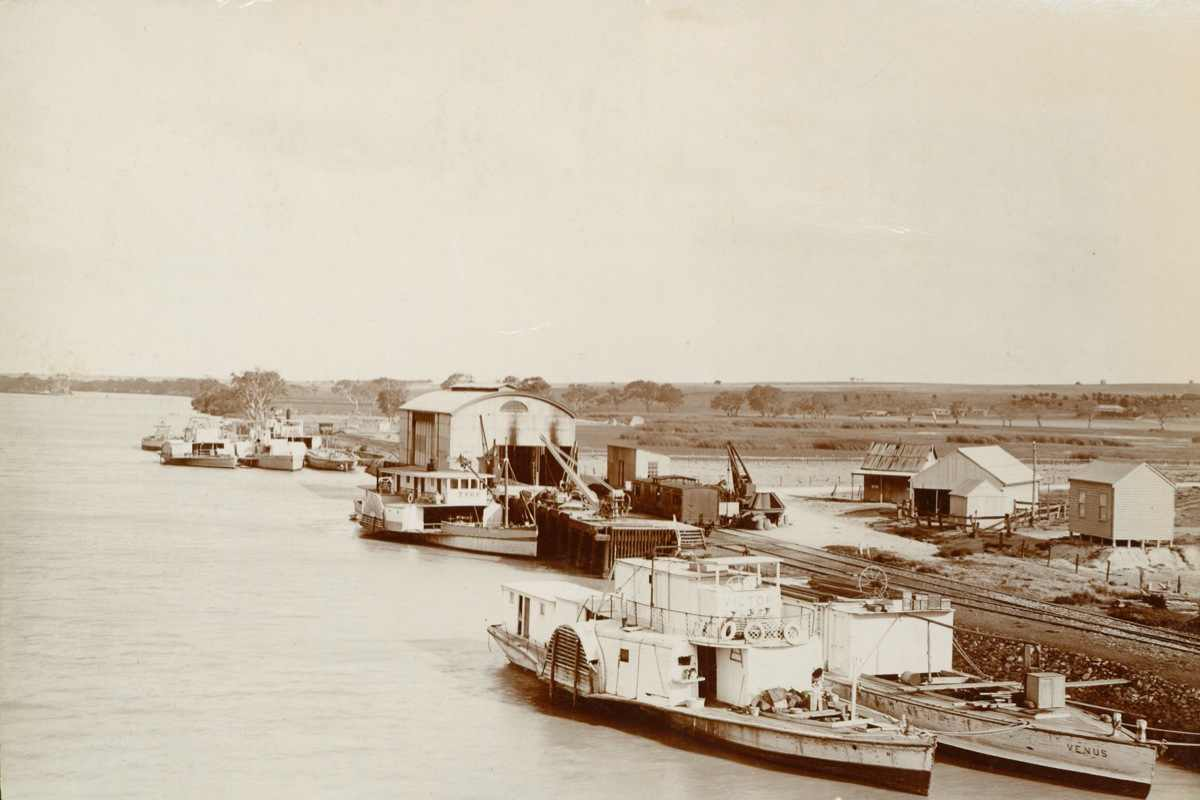
Steamboats at Murray Bridge, 1894

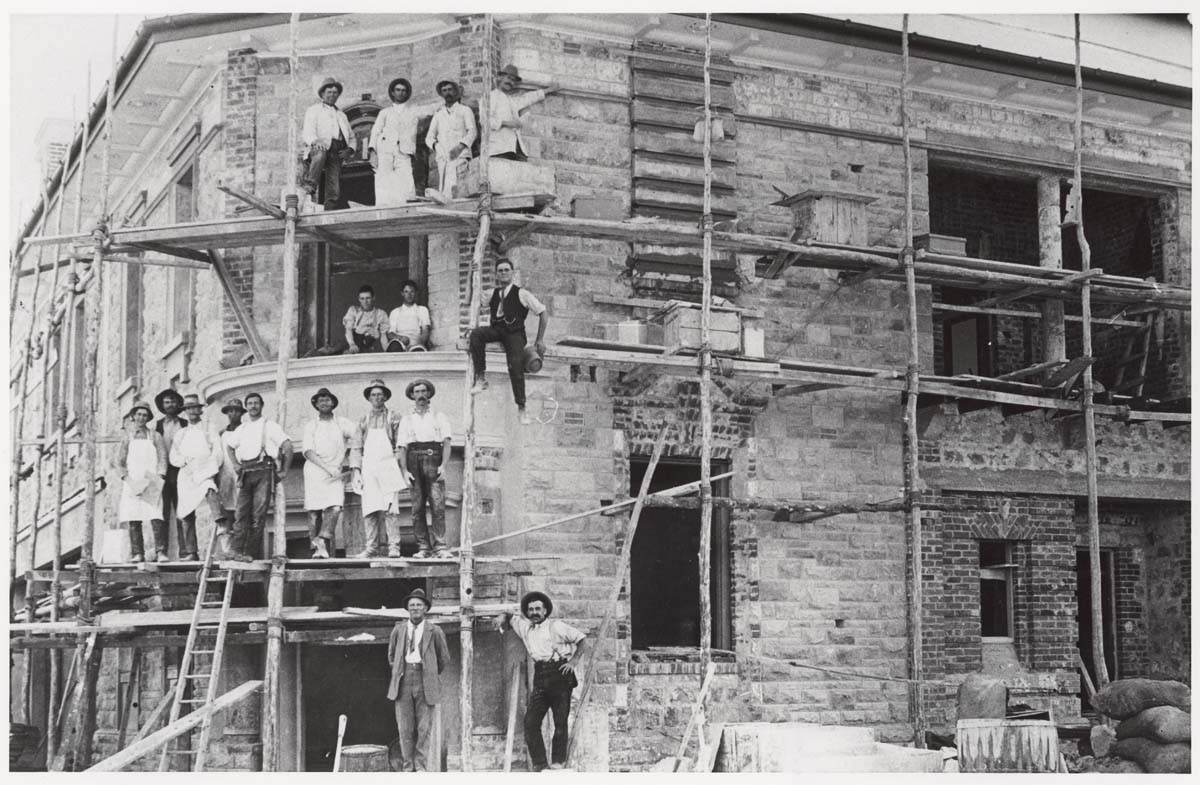
Construction of the Savings Bank, 1915

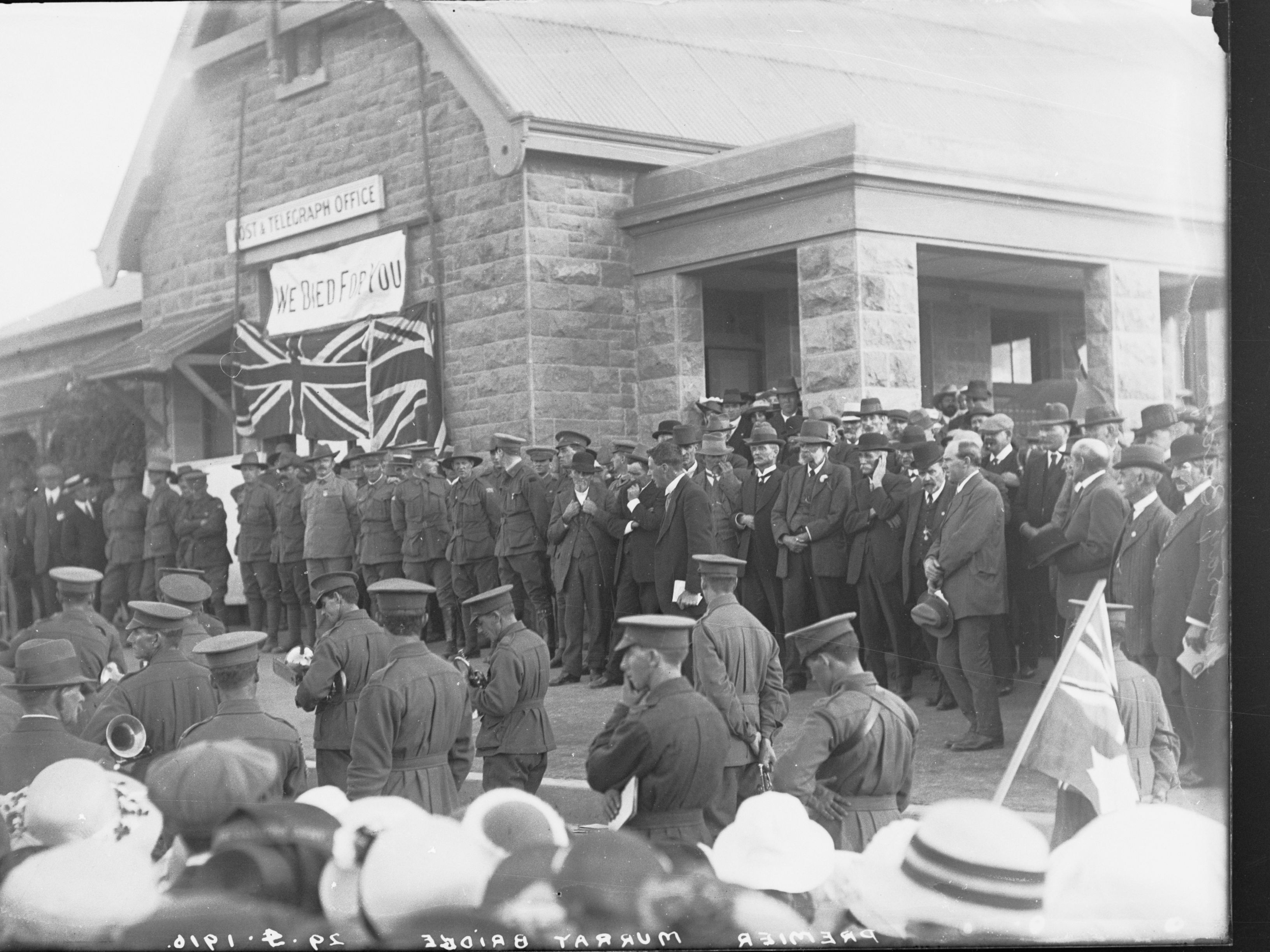
A World War One recruitment drive, Murray Bridge, 1916

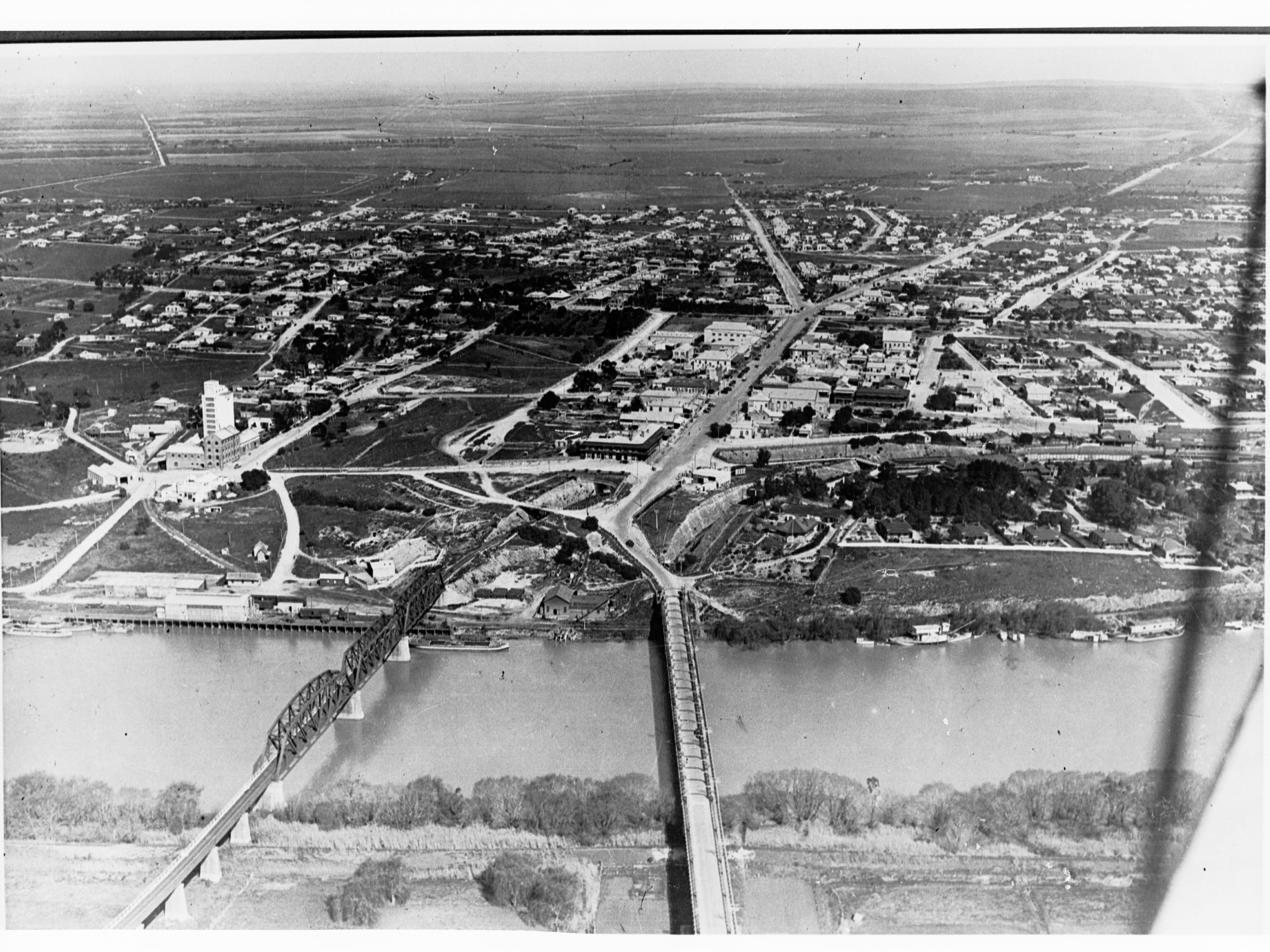
Murray Bridge from the air, 1935

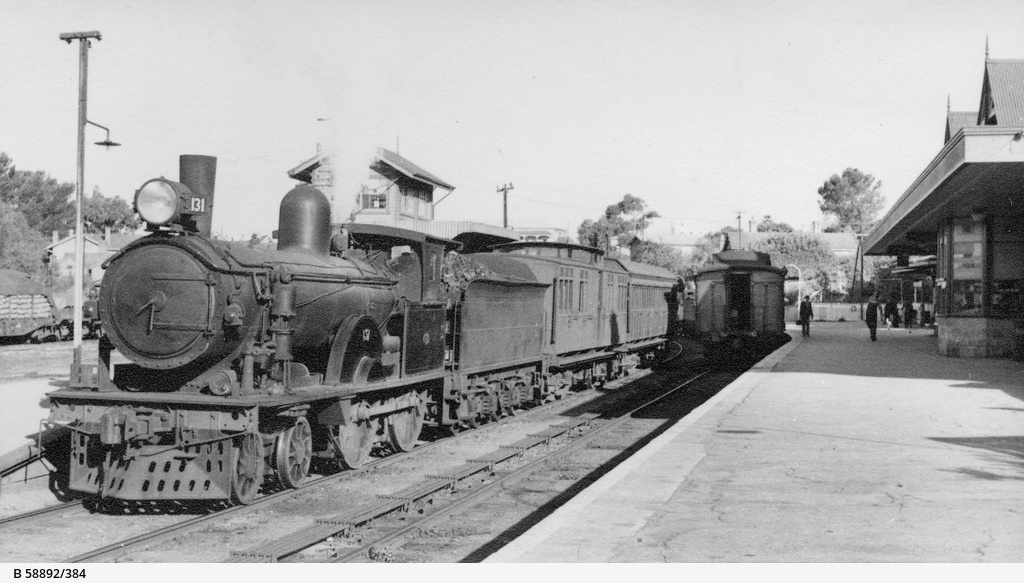
A steam train at Murray Bridge, 1951

== Geography ==
=== Location ===
Murray Bridge is located 76 km south-east of Adelaide and is the population centre of the Murraylands region. The city has an urban area of 97.5 km^{2}, making up 5.3% of the Rural City of Murray Bridge council area of 1,832 km^{2}.

=== Water ===
Situated along the Murray River, the river is the lifeblood of the city and surrounding areas. The river flows into nearby Lake Alexandrina and Lake Albert. Adelaide receives 55% of its water supply from the Murray on average. In the 1982/83 drought, 90% of Adelaide's supply was pumped from the Murray. The "Iron Triangle" industrial area receives 90% of its water from the Murray.

=== Suburbs ===
Refer to the Rural City of Murray Bridge for townships within the council area.

Suburbs within the city include Northern Heights, Murray Bridge North, Murray Bridge East, Murray Bridge South, Riverglades, Gifford Hill, and Avoca Dell.

Murray Bridge also has a number of unofficially named neighbourhoods including: Westside, Southside, Birdsville (also known as Bird Cage, due to the streets being named after birds), Pathways, and Narooma Waters. The latest development to Murray Bridge includes a new estate called Newbridge.

The city used to have a number of neighbourhoods, now part of the wider Murray Bridge township, these included: Hornsey Park, Bridgeport, Riverview, Murray Bridge Estate, Murray Gardens, Totness Park, Dunoon Park, Morningside, South Mobilong, Kerkanya, Ruglea Park, Sladdentown, Glenview, Westland, Slade Park, Rundleville, Railway Land, Myrleville, Ritterville, Riverdene, Hawkelea, Murray Bridge Extension, Pine Park, Laneville, Murray Park, and Esmond Park. Some of these names have been retained as streets, parks or businesses.

=== Climate ===
Murray Bridge has a warm temperate semi-arid climate (Köppen: BSk), with very warm, dry summers and mild, slightly wetter winters. Mean maxima vary from 29.4 °C (84.9 °F) in January and February to 16.3 °C (61.3 °F) in July, while mean minima fluctuate between 14.8 °C (58.6 °F) in January and 5.4 °C (41.7 °F) in July. Annual precipitation is rather low, averaging 348.4 mm (13.72 in) between 101.5 precipitation days. Despite this, the town has 78.8 clear days and 145.7 cloudy days per annum. Extreme temperatures have ranged from 47.5 °C (117.5 °F) on 24 January 2019 to −5.0 °C (23.0 °F) on 21 July 1982.

Climate data for Murray Bridge, elevation 33 m (108 ft), (1991–2020 normals, extremes 1966–present)
Month	Jan	Feb	Mar	Apr	May	Jun	Jul	Aug	Sep	Oct	Nov	Dec	Year
Record high °C (°F)	47.5 (117.5)	46.4 (115.5)	43.7 (110.7)	39.2 (102.6)	31.0 (87.8)	25.6 (78.1)	26.8 (80.2)	30.9 (87.6)	35.0 (95.0)	39.7 (103.5)	44.3 (111.7)	47.3 (117.1)	47.5 (117.5)
Mean daily maximum °C (°F)	30.0 (86.0)	29.7 (85.5)	27.2 (81.0)	23.9 (75.0)	19.9 (67.8)	17.0 (62.6)	16.5 (61.7)	17.9 (64.2)	20.6 (69.1)	23.7 (74.7)	26.5 (79.7)	28.3 (82.9)	23.4 (74.1)
Daily mean °C (°F)	22.5 (72.5)	22.3 (72.1)	20.0 (68.0)	17.0 (62.6)	14.0 (57.2)	11.6 (52.9)	11.0 (51.8)	11.8 (53.2)	14.0 (57.2)	16.5 (61.7)	19.1 (66.4)	20.9 (69.6)	16.7 (62.1)
Mean daily minimum °C (°F)	15.0 (59.0)	14.8 (58.6)	12.8 (55.0)	10.1 (50.2)	8.0 (46.4)	6.1 (43.0)	5.4 (41.7)	5.7 (42.3)	7.3 (45.1)	9.2 (48.6)	11.7 (53.1)	13.5 (56.3)	10.0 (50.0)
Record low °C (°F)	5.1 (41.2)	5.7 (42.3)	4.1 (39.4)	−0.6 (30.9)	−1.8 (28.8)	−4.3 (24.3)	−5.0 (23.0)	−2.0 (28.4)	−1.4 (29.5)	−0.6 (30.9)	2.1 (35.8)	4.0 (39.2)	−5.0 (23.0)
Average precipitation mm (inches)	14.6 (0.57)	19.1 (0.75)	18.7 (0.74)	27.8 (1.09)	32.3 (1.27)	43.6 (1.72)	40.2 (1.58)	37.5 (1.48)	39.5 (1.56)	30.6 (1.20)	26.8 (1.06)	30.5 (1.20)	361.0 (14.21)
Average precipitation days (≥ 0.2 mm)	4.7	5.3	6.1	8.9	12.7	14.9	15.3	14.1	12.7	8.9	7.4	7.0	118.0
Average afternoon relative humidity (%)	38	38	41	45	55	61	59	51	49	42	39	39	46
Source: Australian Bureau of Meteorology (humidity 1991–2010)

== Demographics ==
In the 2016 Census, the Murray Bridge area had a population of 20,858. The median age was 41, and 21.7% of the population were born overseas. The median weekly household income was $973 per week, compared with the South Australian average of $1,206 per week.

The urban area that contains and surrounds Murray Bridge had a population of 16,708 in the 2011 census. In the 2006 census, the population was 14,048. In the 2001 census, the population was 12,998.

In the 2006 Census, 10.4% of the population were born overseas, and 4.5% were Indigenous Australians. The median weekly household income was A$639 per week, compared with $924 in Adelaide. 13.3% of the population identified themselves as Lutheran, while a higher 24.7% identified with no religion.

== Economy ==
=== Local industry ===
The primary industries in the city include agriculture and manufacturing, including food manufacturing.

=== Retail ===
Most of Murray Bridge's retail and dining facilities are located on and in close proximity to Bridge Street. The majority contained within two main shopping centres, Murray Bridge Green and Murray Bridge Marketplace.

Murray Bridge Green opened in 1976 as a Woolworths supermarket and a small number of additional stores. The centre was extended in 2001. A new addition to the original shopping complex was completed in 2015. After 42 years of trading, the Woolworths store closed in May 2018.

A Drakes Supermarket opened in mid-2019 at the former Woolworths supermarket site of Murray Bridge Green shopping centre. Drake's is the seventh supermarket currently operating in Murray Bridge.

Murray Bridge Marketplace was opened in November 2011.

Target closed in early 2021 and was replaced by K Hub.

== Arts and culture ==
=== Entertainment ===
The Murray Bridge Town Hall, built in 1911 and redeveloped in 2010, is a theatre seating up to 300 people located in the city centre. It is managed by the Rural City of Murray Bridge council and hosts events year-round including musicals, travelling shows and fringe festival events.

Cameo Cinema, a single-screen cinema that seats 250 people, is located on Second Street within the city centre. It shows major movie releases and is the only cinema in the region.

=== Local events ===
Murray Bridge hosts a number of popular community events such as the Murray Bridge Fringe Festival, Christmas Pageant and Fireworks Spectacular, Splash Festival, and numerous street stalls and farmers markets.

=== Museums and gallery ===
The city is home to the Round House and Captain's Cottage Museum, both are open for tours and interactive experiences with the history of the area.

The Murray Bridge Regional Gallery exhibits local and regional artists and includes a gallery shop.

=== Public library ===
The Murray Bridge Library, is a public library operated by the Rural City of Murray Bridge council, and is located on the lower level in the Murray Bridge Marketplace shopping centre. Opened in 2011, after moving from its former location on South Terrace, the library overlooks the Murray River and boasts a large selection of books, self-service kiosks, computers, kitchen and gallery areas.

== Parks, recreation, and sport ==
=== Parks and open spaces ===
The Murray Bridge area has approximately 65 parks, reserves and open spaces for public use that range from small reserves to large family-friendly areas.

==== Sturt Reserve ====
Sturt Reserve (including Wharf Hill and precinct) is a popular riverfront area that includes a large playground, barbeque areas, mooring and shelter.

Murray Bridge is home to "The Bunyip", a mechanical representation of the legendary water monster, located on Sturt Reserve. Many South Australian children fondly remember their first visit to the Bunyip, putting a coin in the machine and watching the Bunyip emerge from its watery cage complete with shrieking sound effects.

==== Murray Bridge Linear Park ====
The Murray Bridge Linear Park is a shared-use walkway that runs along Adelaide Road. Opening in stages, the Linear Park includes public toilets, shelter and a BBQ area. It provides a protected pedestrian and bicycle path leading eastward to the city centre.

=== Sport ===
In 1924 the Murray Bridge rowing team was chosen to represent Australia at the Paris Olympics. The Murray Cods, as they were known, won the Australian Eight-Oared Championships (the King's Cup) and were invited to compete in a test race at Port Adelaide between South Australia, Western Australia, Tasmania, and Victoria. Although accustomed to rowing over 3 mi (4.8 km), the Murray Cods were able to defeat the other crews on the 1 mi (1.6 km) mile and 420 yd (380 m) (2 km) course. In February 2024 it was announced that the crew would be posthumously inducted into the South Australian Sport Hall of Fame.

Murray Bridge is also home to the River Murray Football League, which plays Australian rules football. The league consists of the Murray Bridge-based clubs of Ramblers and Imperials and the district teams of Mypolonga, Mannum, Tailem Bend, Jervois and Meningie.

In 2005 the city's golf course, Murray Bridge Golf Club, held the State's premier regional junior team event, the Brett Ogle Cup (named after the Australian Professional golfer Brett Ogle). The home team went undefeated and qualified for the state final, losing narrowly. The team had not previously experienced such success; junior golf in the region has since obtained a higher profile.

Another sporting association in Murray Bridge is the Murray Bridge Amateur Swim Club (The Cods) which competes in meets with other clubs, as well as Country Championships (a large meet for all of the rural South Australian swim clubs) and state and national championships.

Murray Bridge is also the home of the Murray Bridge Racing Club, Murray Bridge and District Table Tennis Association, and holds the 24-hour Australian International Pedal Prix race annually in September. Murray Bridge Lutheran Tennis Club plays hard court tennis on their home courts based at Christian Reserve. Hard court tennis is hosted by various clubs throughout the community, including Jervois, Brinkley, Mannum, Mypolonga and Tailem Bend as well as clubs within the township. Hard court tennis is played on both Friday nights and Saturday mornings. There are both Junior and senior divisions. Friday night tennis offers a social alternative, often offering barbecues and after-game drinks. Lawn tennis is played at Sturt Reserve on Saturday mornings and afternoons from October to February, and is organised by the Murray Bridge Lawn Tennis Association.

Murray Bridge is also known for its basketball, having won numerous State Country Championships and many of its young players going on to represent South Australia in the National Championships.

Murray Bridge is also home to the Murray Bridge Speedway which has been in operation since 1958. Located on the eastern side of the river, the speedway is a 360 metres (390 yd) long dirt track racing venue that caters to both motorcycle speedway and car racing, hosting numerous Australian and South Australian championships during its existence. On 12 November 2011 the speedway hosted its first ever World Championship event when it will host the FIM 2011 World Sidecar speedway Championship with Murray Bridge's own Jesse Headland winning the title as passenger to NSW based rider Darrin Treloar. Headland was the winner of the 2010 Championship in England with his father Mick Headland.

== Governance ==
=== Local government ===
The following bounded localities gazetted in South Australia are considered suburbs of the city of Murray Bridge and are governed by the same city council: Avoca Dell, Gifford Hill, Greenbanks, Long Flat, Mobilong, Monteith, Murray Bridge East, Murray Bridge North, Murray Bridge South, Northern Heights, Riverglades, Riverglen, Sunnyside, Swanport, Toora, White Hill, White Sands, and Willow Banks.

=== State and federal government ===
Murray Bridge is part of the state Electoral district of Hammond, which has been held since 2006 by Liberal MP Adrian Pederick. In federal politics, the city is part of the division of Barker, and has been represented by Liberal MP Tony Pasin since 2013. At local level, Murray Bridge is part of the Rural City of Murray Bridge local government area.

== Education ==
=== Primary and secondary education ===
Local schools include Unity College, Murray Bridge North School, Murray Bridge South Primary School, Fraser Park Primary School, St Joseph's School, Murray Bridge High School and Tyndale Christian College.

=== Tertiary education ===
Murray Bridge has a small TAFE SA campus, which offers a limited selection of tertiary courses. Flinders University opened a rural medical campus in 2012. This location gives students a rural medical placement.

== Media ==
=== Newspaper ===
Murray Bridge is home to The Murray Valley Standard newspaper, whose first edition was printed and distributed on 23 November 1934. It is now published on Tuesdays and Thursdays. Dozens of other regional newspapers, publications and catalogues are also printed at the former Rural Press facility on Adelaide Road.

In 2020, Australian Community Media (ACM) announced that the Murray Valley Standard will cease being printed along with a number of other regional newspapers. This was in part due to COVID-19, but also due to organisational changes and growing online activity. The printing press at the Murray Bridge site was closed and resulted in the loss of 26 jobs.

However, the Murray Valley Standard is still published online as of 19 May 2021.

A monthly community newspaper, first printed on 19 August 1971, was the Bridge Observer (1971–1976). It was later revived in 1983 under the same title, including an insert called Mannum Mercury (1983–1984), and was briefly known as the combined title of Bridge Mercury (1984).

=== Radio ===
Radio stations 5MU (96.3 MHz) and Power FM SA (98.7 MHz) are based at Murray Bridge, with their transmitters located near the peak of Gifford Hill.

Adelaide FM radio stations can also be received relatively clearly throughout the Murray Bridge region, when using an in-car radio, as well as ABC Radio Adelaide on 891kHz.

The other Adelaide AM stations, such as Gold 1323 and FIVEaa, have poor reception due to terrain constraints from the Mount Lofty Ranges and Adelaide Hills.

=== Television ===
Channels from the following television networks are available in Murray Bridge:

- ABC Television (ABC)
- SBS Television (SBS)
- Seven Network as SAS-7
- Nine Network as NWS-9
- Network 10 as ADS-10

The WIN Television (7, 9, 10) stations RTS-5A, RDS-30, and LRS-34 relays the programming from Seven Network (Seven SA), Nine Network (Nine SA) and Network Ten (Ten SA), can be received clearly in the Murray Bridge region.

=== Online ===
Local journalist, Peri Strathearn established the Murray Bridge News after the job losses at the Murray Valley Standard. Murray Bridge News is an online platform that regularly publishes articles from the city's only dedicated full-time journalist.

== Infrastructure ==
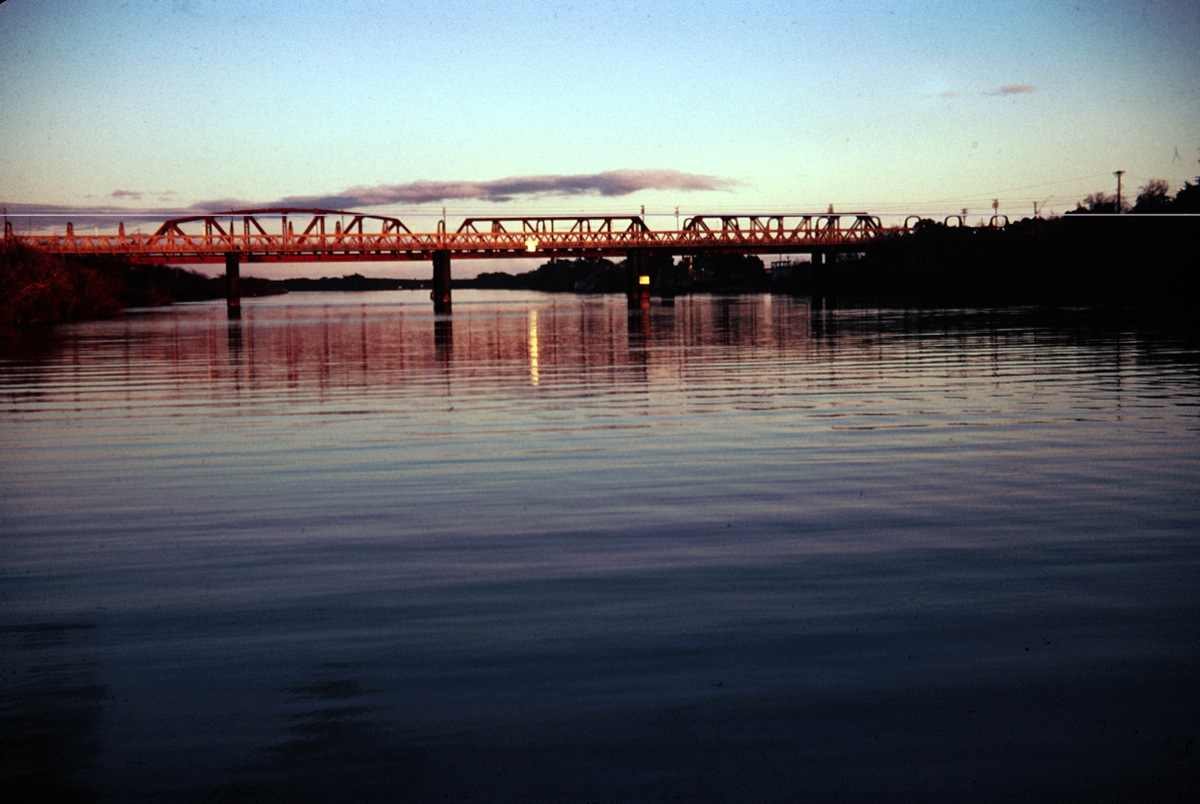
The Rail Bridge over the Murray River at sunset, 1975

=== Transport ===
==== Rail ====
Murray Bridge railway station is on the Adelaide to Wolseley railway line, the South Australian part of the Melbourne–Adelaide rail corridor. It is served by Journey Beyond's twice weekly passenger service The Overland operating between Adelaide and Melbourne.

The Overland is the only passenger railway that still services Murray Bridge, after South Australia's regional rail services operations were scrapped in the 1990s. Over recent years there have been discussions about re-instating commuter rail services between Adelaide and Murray Bridge, however there has been little to no progress made.

The Murray Bridge Transport Precinct is a historic area that includes the railway station and wharf area, the original bridge constructed in 1879 and converted for dual road and rail use in 1886. It returned to being only a road bridge in 1925 when a separate rail bridge (also included in the heritage precinct) opened to handle heavier trains. The railway now passes under the road approach to the bridge through the Murray Bridge Tunnel, a short cut-and-cover tunnel built as part of works for the new rail bridge in 1925.

==== Highways ====
Both bridges cross the Murray River between Murray Bridge and Murray Bridge East. The road bridge was part of the Princes Highway from 1935 until 1979. Murray Bridge is now connected by road to Adelaide via the South Eastern Freeway which leads to a newer crossing of the river further south on the Swanport Bridge built in 1979. State road route B35 connects from the north of the town towards Palmer and the central Adelaide Hills and route B36 leads towards Mannum, other river towns and the Sturt Highway.

==== Bus ====
Various bus and coach services are provided in Murray Bridge, the primary operator being LinkSA, operating a service to Adelaide via Mount Barker and local 'Dial-A-Ride' service. Stateliner (formerly Premier Stateliner) stop at Murray Bridge on its south-east services to Mt Gambier.

V/Line operate day and night coaches between Adelaide Central bus station and Melbourne, and Firefly to Sydney, both operators service Murray Bridge.

==== Airport ====
Murray Bridge Airport is nine kilometres north of the town, but does not have any scheduled services.

==== Walking trails ====
The Lavender Federation Trail is a long-distance walking trail (350 kilometres or 220 miles) that extends from Murray Bridge along the eastern Mount Lofty Ranges to Clare.

== Sister cities ==
Murray Bridge has two sister cities.

- Laredo, Texas, United States of America
- Sanmenxia, China

== Gallery ==
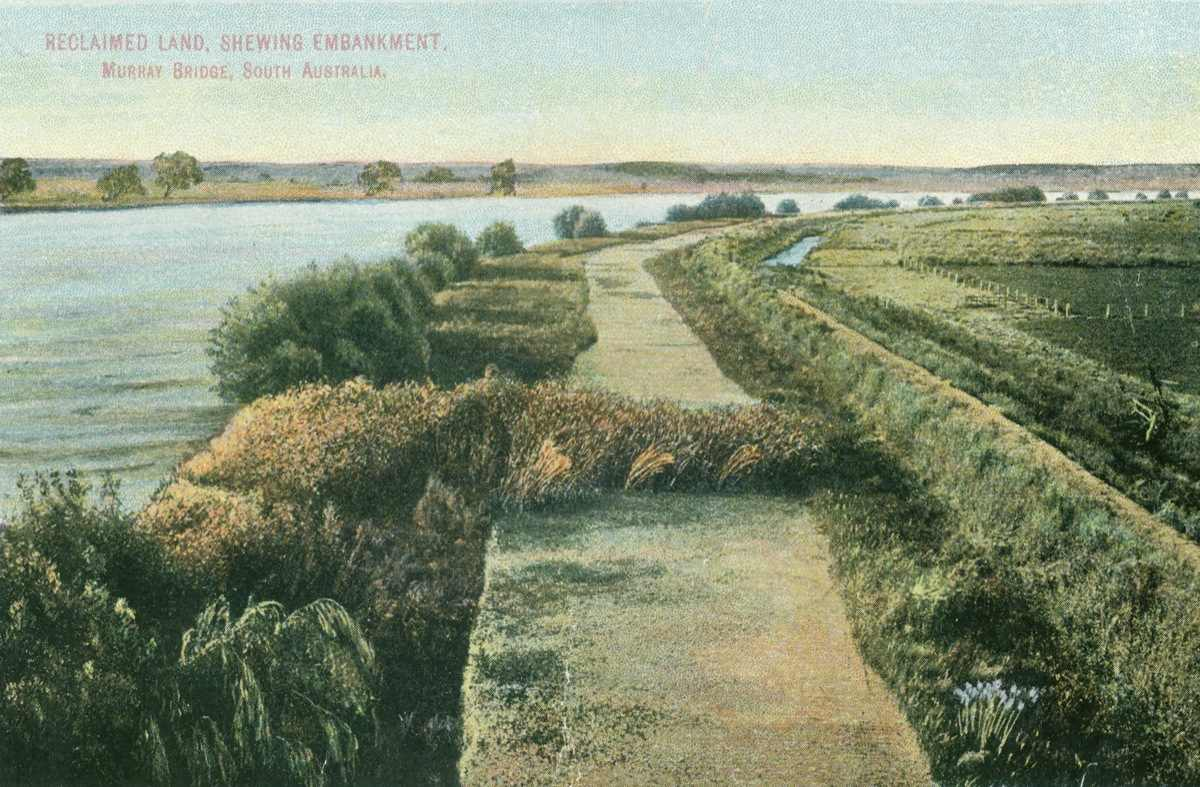
Murray Bridge in 1912.

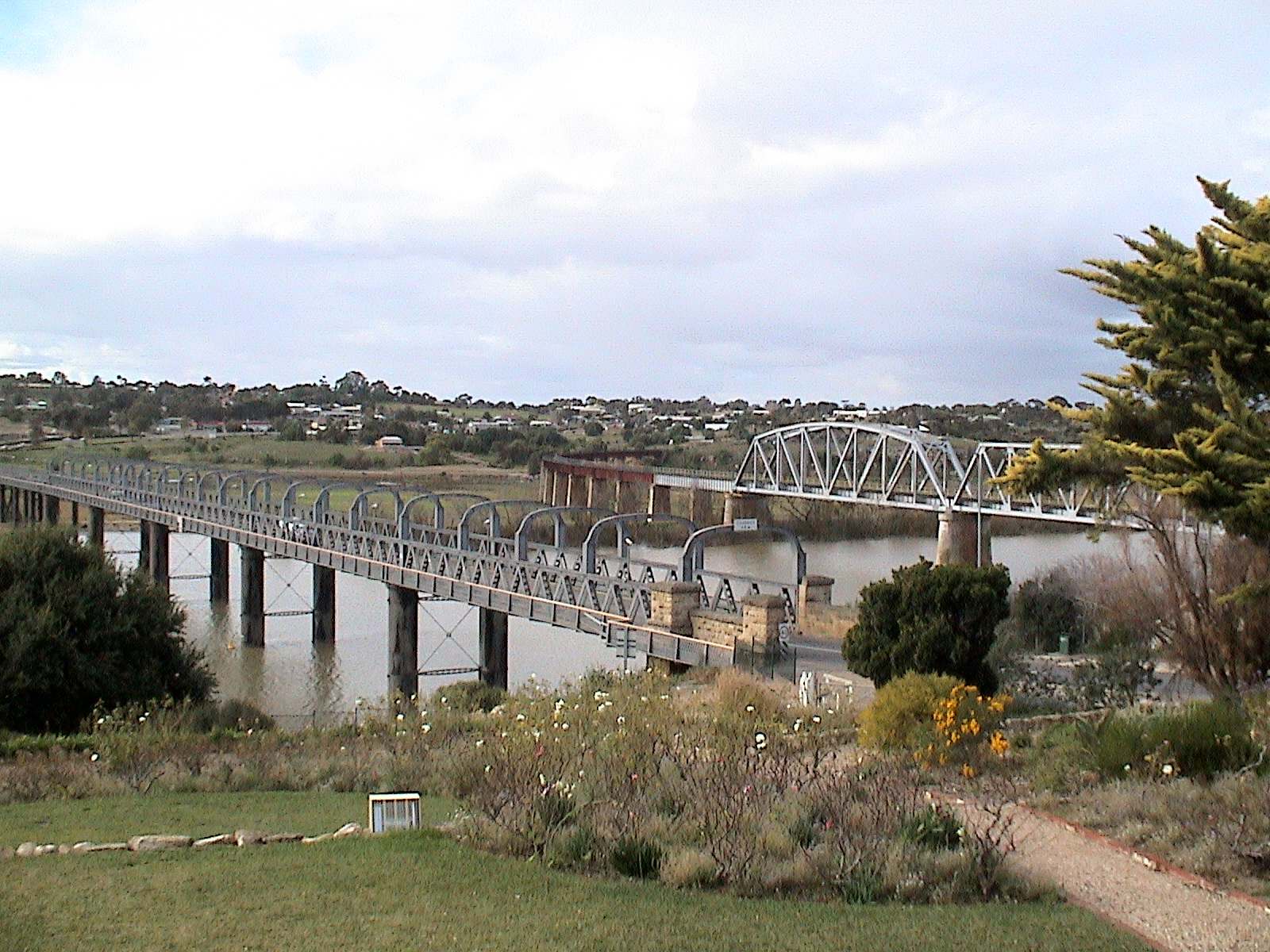
The Murray Bridge road (left, 1879) and rail (right, 1924) bridges over the Murray River.

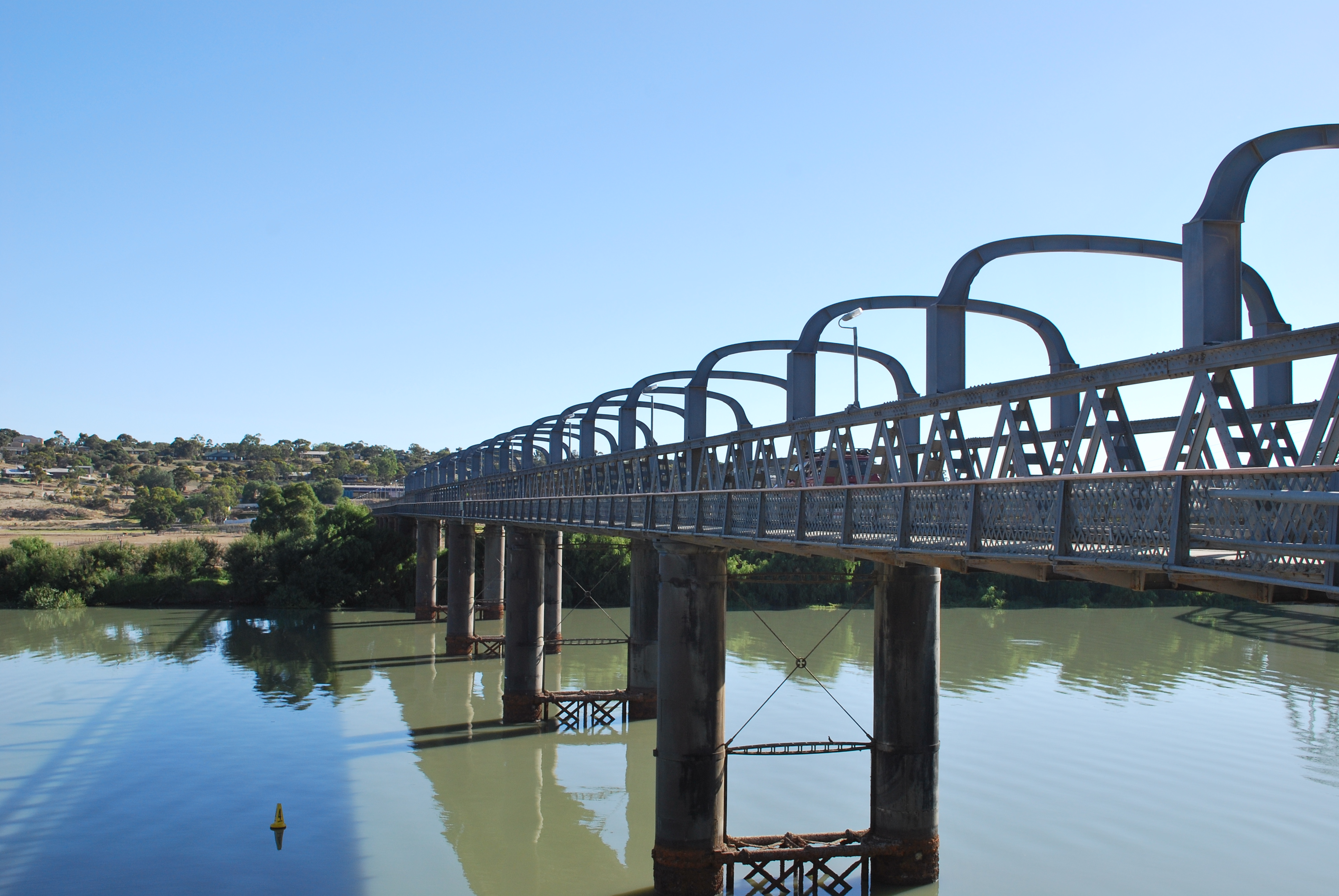
The 1879 road bridge.

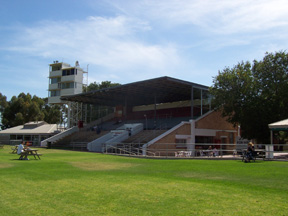
Grandstand at the Murray Bridge Racetrack.

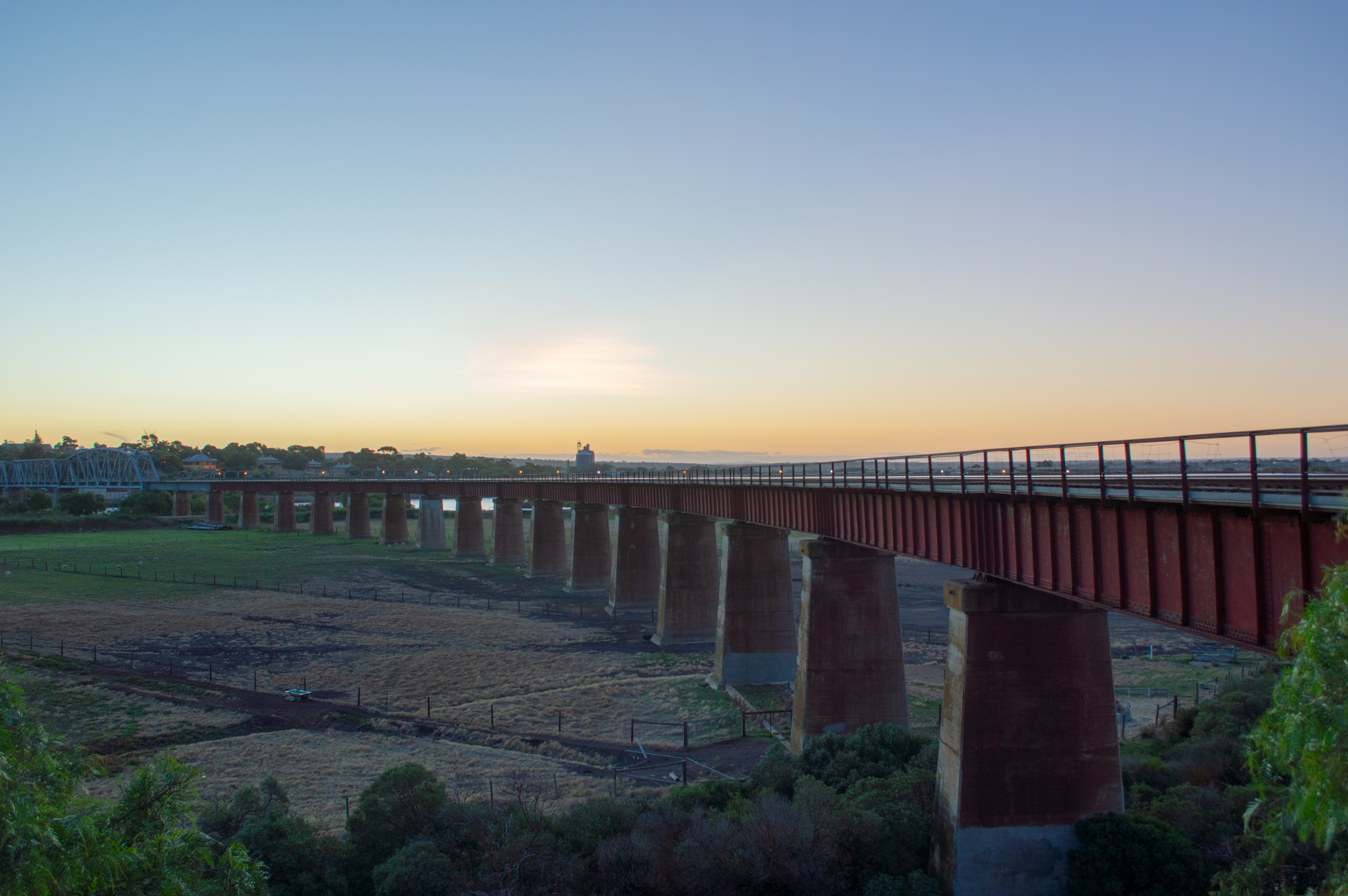
Rail bridge over flats

== Notable residents ==
- Danielle Catanzariti
- Bryn Coudraye
- Jacqui Delaney
- Paul Berryman
- Ben Dougall
- Donald Dunstan (governor)
- Stephen Edward Foster
- David Gulpilil actor, d. 2021
- Jo Hill
- James McRae
- Simon Overland
- Clement Semmler
- James Smith
- Ben Wilden
- Chad Wingard
- Peter O'Brien (actor)
- Alby Mangels
- Alex Bolt
- Deadly Nannas (Ngarrindjeri singers)

== See also ==
- List of cities and towns in South Australia
- List of crossings of the Murray River
- List of islands within the Murray River in South Australia
- Long Island Recreation Park
- St John the Baptist Cathedral, Murray Bridge
