= Mannum–Adelaide pipeline =

Water pipeline in South Australia

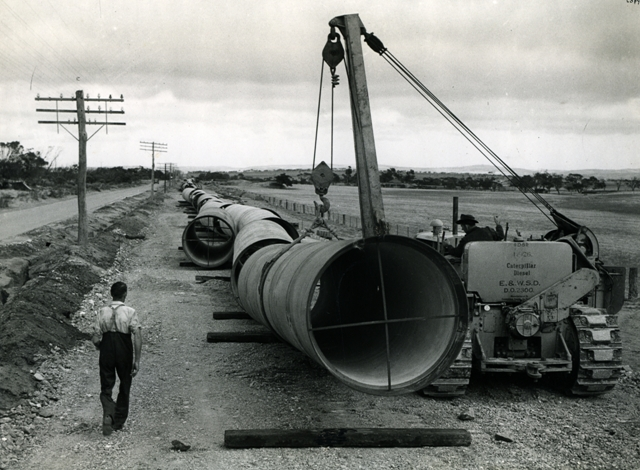
- 58-inch pipes between Palmer and Mannum. Photo taken February 1951. Man in foreground walking away from camera is Harold Bartholomaeus

Location
- Country: Australia
- State: South Australia
- Coordinates: 34.919°S 139.308°E
- Direction: West
- Start: Mannum
- To: Hope Valley

General information
- Type: Water
- Status: Operational
- Owner: SA Water

Technical information
- Length: 60 km (37 mi)
- Diameter: 58 in (1,473 mm)

The Mannum–Adelaide pipeline is a water pipeline in South Australia. It was the first major pipeline built from the River Murray to serve Adelaide. The pipeline project was started in 1949 and completed in March 1955. After suffering water restrictions every summer from 1949 to 1954, in the summer of 1957–1958 Adelaide was the only mainland capital not subject to restrictions.

The pipeline is 60 kilometres long and goes from Mannum to Hope Valley in Adelaide. Off takes from the pipeline supply the Warren Reservoir transfer main near Williamstown, the Little Para Reservoir dissipater on the outskirts of Adelaide, as well as the water treatment plants at Mannum, Palmer, Mt Pleasant and Anstey Hill. It is one of only two major pipelines in South Australia to supply Adelaide water from the River Murray, the other being the Murray Bridge-Onkaparinga pipeline. These two pipelines are also the only two pipelines used for bulk raw water transfer.

From 2019, SA Water has sought to reduce operating costs associated with the pipeline by installing a solar panel array to provide power for each pumping station on the route. Solar farms for Pipeline Pumping Stations 2 and 3 (PPS.2 and PPS.3) are both installed in the Palmer area.
