= Tungkillo, South Australia =

Tungkillo South Australia
- Coordinates: 34°49′0″S 139°04′0″E
- Population: 342 (SAL 2021)
- Established: 1861
- Postcode(s): 5236
- Location: 60 km (37 mi) north-east of Adelaide; 25 km (16 mi) north-west of Mannum; 5 km (3 mi) south of Mount Pleasant
- LGA(s): Mid Murray Council
- Region: Adelaide Hills
- State electorate(s): Hammond
- Federal division(s): Barker
Localities around Tungkillo:
Mount Pleasant	Mount Pleasant	Milendella
Birdwood; Mount Torrens	Tungkillo	Palmer
Harrogate	Rockleigh	Rockleigh

Tungkillo (34°49′S 139°04′E, postcode 5236, altitude 391m) is a town in South Australia, located approximately 5 km (3.1 mi) south of Mount Pleasant. It sits on Adelaide-Mannum Road, 60 km (37 mi) north-east of the state capital, Adelaide and 25 km (16 mi) north-west of Mannum. At the 2006 census, Tungkillo had a population of 360.

Tungkillo was originally the name of a mine located south of Palmer, which opened in 1847. In 1848, a town was surveyed at the mine, The present-day town was settled by Samuel Patten in 1861, who called it South Petherton (after the Somerset town of South Petherton from which his family originated). The name of South Petherton was officially altered on 24 January 1906 to Tungkillo, although the two names were used interchangeably as late as 1936.

Tungkillo is a corruption of tainkila, a Peramangk Aboriginal word meaning ghost moth grubs.

The historic former Terlinga Station Shearing Shed on Hoads Woolshed Road and a former grain threshing floor on Loxton Road, are both listed on the South Australian Heritage Register.

Tungkillo is in the Mid Murray Council local government area, the South Australian House of Assembly electoral district of Hammond and the Australian House of Representatives Division of Barker.
