= Peramangk =

Aboriginal people of South Australia

Peramangk people
- aka: Peramarma, Tanganekald, Mereldi, Merildakald, Marimejuna, Wangarainbula, Mount Barker tribe, Ngurlinjeri, Tarrawatta (Tindale)
- Approximate location of the Peramangk territory, according to Tindale.

Hierarchy
- Language family: Pama–Nyungan
- Language branch: Yura-Thura
- Language group: Peramangk
- Group dialects: Dharuk, Gamaraygal, Iora

Area (approx. 1,100 square kilometres (420 sq mi))
- Bioregion: Adelaide Hills, Fleurieu Peninsula
- Location: Adelaide Hills and Fleurieu Peninsula South Australia, Australia
- Coordinates: 34°55′S 138°55′E
- Mountains: Southern Mount Lofty Ranges, Barossa Ranges
- Rivers: Includes but not limited to - Marne River, North Para River, South Para River, North Rhine River - Uppermost reaches of the Sturt River - Upper and middle reaches of: Onkaparinga River, Myponga River, Reedy Creek, River Torrens, River Angas, Finniss River, Bremer River, Mt Barker Creek, and their tributaries; along with many other Adelaide Hills creeks such as Tookayerta Creek, Meadows Creek and Blackfellows Creek in the south up to Duckponds Creek in the north.

Notable individuals
- Parruwonga-burka, Monarta.

The Peramangk are an Aboriginal Australian people whose lands traditionally comprise the Adelaide Hills, as well as lands to the west of the Murray River in mid Murraylands and through to the northern part of the Fleurieu Peninsula in the Australian state of South Australia.

A particular group of Peramangk were sometimes referred to by settlers as the Mount Barker tribe, as their numbers were noted to be great around the Mount Barker summit, meanwhile Peramangk country also extends from the Angaston district and the Barossa Range in the north, south to Myponga, east to Mannum and west to the Mount Lofty Ranges.

Colonial reports of the mid 1800s, as well as modern research, describe varying degrees of respect, intermarriage, trade and competition between the tribes of the Adelaide region, being the Kaurna, Ngarrindjeri, Ngadjuri, Peramangk and others. While each tribe had differing cultural practices, they often met on Peramangk land or through Peramangk facilitation. Conflicts between indigenous tribes may have been exacerbated by the upheaval of European arrival.

It is often stated that after the European settlement of the Adelaide Hills, Aboriginal South Australians, including people of Peramangk heritage, were forced into missions set up by church and government organisations, as were many of the Kaurna and other neighbouring tribes. Many Peramangk may have integrated with the Kaurna, Ngarrindjeri, Nganguruku or other tribes, although relocation from traditional lands was not universal. In recent decades, there have been moves to identify Peramangk descendants through genealogy and through outreach to those who identify as Peramangk. Adelaide Hills schools, churches and local councils hold frequent welcome to country ceremonies hosted by Peramangk elders and artists.

== Family groups and territories ==
Peramangk family group names include Poonawatta, Tarrawatta, Karrawatta, Yira-Ruka, Wiljani, Mutingengal, Runganng, Jolori, Pongarang, Paldarinalwar, Merelda. While some major aspects of Peramangk culture became unpractised during European settlement, many families survive with a Peramangk genealogy. Norman Tindale in his various interviews with Peramangk descendants recorded the names of at least eight family groups: the Poonawatta to the west of Mount Crawford, the Yira-Ruka (Wiljani) to the east down as far as Mount Torrens and Mannum and the Tarrawatta whose lands extended to the North as far as Angaston. The Karrawatta (west) and Mutingengal (east), occupied lands to the north of Mount Barker, but somewhat south of the River Torrens. The Rungang, Pongarang, and the Merelda, occupied the lands to the south of Mount Barker, in preceding order down as far as Myponga in the south.

== Peramangk language ==
The Peramangk language belongs to the greater Pama-Nyungan group of languages. Bowern (2011) classifies it as Lower Murray. When interviewing Robert 'Tarby' Mason, Tindale learned that the language of the Peramangk was related to the groups as far north as Lake Victoria. That put them in close contact with the Nganguruku, Ngaiawang, Ngadjuri, Ngarkat and Maraura peoples, as well as their clear relationship with the Kaurna people and language.

== Dreaming stories ==
- Montongenggl – a legend of two children in the stringy bark tree
- Yurebilla – The Giant whose body became the Mount Lofty Ranges
- Two Mates – Who travelled from other lands way up north to visit the Peramangk people at Mount Lofty
- Tjilbruke – The Water and Fire Man who travelled around all of Peramangk territory marking the boundaries of their territories with his travels. Feeling saddened and deciding he no longer wanted to live as a man, he covered himself in feathers and transformed his spirit into a Glossy Ibis. His body was left behind as a memorial, taking the form of an iron pyrite outcrop in Barrukungga, or the place of hidden fire, in the town of Brukunga in the Mount Lofty Ranges.
- The Mingka Bird – Little Bird who lived on Mount Barker and who announced the approach of visitors and the imminent death of a loved one
- Tak:Oni – Little Spirit Men who would throw stones at campers at night if they strayed too far from the fire
- Kadli-Umbo – The Wild Dog Rainbow whose colours can be seen in the waters of Kaiserstuhl Creek
- Nurrunderi – The father of the Ngarrindjeri people
- Nganno the Giant

Gurltatakko Nganno's son was murdered and Nganno, after holding an inquest, journeyed far and wide to find the murderer or murderers. On his journey he named the places of his country. Nganno moved around the earth that was flat without rivers and streams. As he moved around he made the rivers and filled them with yabbies and fish to eat. When Nganno had found the murderers and killed them, he went back home, but his people panicked on seeing him, for he was much changed. They ran into the sea in fear, where they were transformed into sea creatures. Then he told them not to enter the water, one answered "I am a shark", another "I am a whale", and so on. Seeing him transformed into a giant, in the end Nganno himself was killed by his own people who did not recognise him. When he fell down his body became the Mount Lofty ranges, Yurre-idla (Mount Lofty and Mount Bonython) his two ears, Picca-idla (Piccadilly) his eyebrow, Ngariatpa (Nuriootpa) his neck, Tanunda his elbow, and so on.

== Lands of the Peramangk ==
The territory of the various family groups identified as Peramangk extended in a crescent shape from Myponga across to Currency Creek, swinging north along the western ridge line of the Mount Lofty Ranges to Sandy Creek. The eastern boundary followed the eastern escarpment north to Mount Karinya, with the northern boundary following the south bank of the Gawler River. Access points to the River Murray could be found along Salt Creek to Mypolonga and Wall and in the North down the Marne River at Wongulla.

Post European arrival, the territory of the Peramangk shifted, as numbers dwindled, to include land from Clarendon west to Tungkillo and down along Salt Creek to Mypolonga, back in a narrow strip to Strathalbyn then south to Currency Creek, Bull Creek to Clarendon. The territory of the Peramangk people prior to European arrival followed clearly defined geographical boundaries and is confirmed by both art site locations, the Tjilbruke Songline (full version), and interviews with survivors, recorded by Tindale in various journals.

== Observations ==
- 90% of place names in the Mount Lofty Ranges relate to physical features within the landscape and what can be found there.
- Several place names relate to food or water or tools, and the times of the year that they are in abundance, e.g., maitpalangga.
- Other place names reflect both the major geographical feature of a place and also its physical state at certain times of the year, e.g., yertalungga.
- 5% of place names refer to song-lines or stories within the landscape, e.g., Barrukangga, Kadliumbo, Karikarinya.
- Some place names refer to not only the major natural feature of the area but also the name of the family group which occupied the region e.g., Tarrawatta, Karrawatta.
- Many places names are made up of two more words contracted together to create a new place name or an entirely new word. Teichelmann noted that this flexibility in both Kaurna and Peramangk languages allowed for the creation and pronunciation that was neither uniform nor consistent across family and culture groups.
- The language of place names within the landscape shows a clear affinity with both Kaurna and Ngadjuri languages. That is consistent with Tindale's findings that Peramangk people shared both a language and culture with the other two peoples.
- Place names within the landscape mark a clear boundary of Peramangk territory. That is consistent with Tindale's findings, and is reflected in the locations of art sites along the eastern escarpment, and the boundaries defined in the Tjilbruke and Nurrunderi song-lines.
- There are clear dialectic differences between Peramangk and Kaurna place names, especially east and north east of Mount Barker.
- Tindale noted that at two sites along the River Murray where Peramangk people had access to the river, Peramangk place names can be found, Maitangga, Maitpalangga, Tartangga, Taingappa.
- The shift in Peramangk territorial boundaries recorded by Berndt reflects a shift in population and location of the traditional owners to areas between Manunka and Murray Bridge, across to Clarendon. The extension of Nanguruku lands into the Adelaide Hills further reflects the relocation of some Peramangk people to their relations along the River Murray, an area north of Manunka to Swan Reach.
- The depopulation of areas originally inhabited, and the subsequent taking over of that territory by other more populous groups, is reflected in changing territorial boundaries, art styles, and places names. The landscape records the time of that change and the subsequent locations of the surviving populations.

== Life stages ==
=== Women of the Karnumeru (Hill People) ===
Like the men, Peramangk (Kartameru) women passed through various stages of life as they aged and became involved in the life of the clan. At large gatherings of several different family groups in the late spring and early summer, at about the time of the appearance of the Pleiades star group, the young women of the family began preparations for their coming initiation and travel to their new husbands lands.

Takanna: Prior to the onset of puberty, the young girls lived with their family and were raised by their uncles' wives and the Elder women of the family group into which they were born. During that time, they accompanied the women on their daily routines and were subject to few restrictions. In early infancy they were betrothed to much older men. Those arrangements were generally adhered to, unless circumstances necessitated a change, e.g. the death of the promised man. With the onset of puberty, the young girls underwent their first stage of initiation. Gathered together in a group away from the main camp, the young girls were first held down by senior male members of their family, one at the head, and one each holding down the arms and legs, they were then covered with a skin rug, whilst the Elder women of the family proceeded to pluck out all of their hair, except for their head. All the time reciting the ritual words that announced their passing into womanhood.

Similar in form to the boy's first initiation ceremonies, the young women were then covered in red ochre mixed with animal fat, and led away to live with Elder women in an unmarried women's camp, apart from the main camp, and out of sight of the young, unmarried men. There they learnt the secrets of their family. The Dreaming and Law that they needed to know were passed on to them, and they were then taken into the lands of her new husband. The totemic affiliations of the family also passed down the female line, so that any children she bore were also of the same totem group as their mother.

The young women generally left to live with their husbands at about the age of 12. Relatives nearer than cousins were not allowed to marry and the young women were generally married to much older men. They would often be the youngest of two or more wives, with some men having up to four. Once the marriage had been decided, the young woman would pick up her net bag containing the tools and objects she would need to start her new life, and head off to her husband's camp and thence to his family's lands.

Mangkarra(Chevron Scars): Upon reaching their husband's family group, the young women's education would continue under the guidance of the Elder women of her new family. They were then taught the more localized Dreaming, and Laws of their new family, as well as the skills and duties they would need to fit in with their new roles. Women rarely became mothers before the age of 16, but before then they would have to undergo their second initiation rite, that of the Mangkarra, or scarring of their shoulders. From that time on, the young woman was allowed to partake in all the activities of the family group as her education continued.

Tukkuparka: Once the young woman had undergone the Mangkarra ceremony she was known as a Tukkuparka. She held that title whilst she was still learning to be a wife and once she had given birth to her first child. Now that she was married, she was welcomed into the world of adult women. It was after the birth of her first child that she had her belly scarred and again after each subsequent birth.

Tukkupurlaitya: As a general rule, a woman who had only given birth to two children was only allowed limited access to secret knowledge. She did gain stories and ceremonies but learned only their general meaning and nature. Some of that lore was hers to own; others she shared just a part of. As she moved from one group into another, her Dreaming knowledge covered a much broader area, often outside of her birth country. Monarta of Echunga married John Mason Snr, whose country extended from Mount Barker, to Nairne, to Wall and Mypolonga.

Tukkuangki: If a mother of two or more children, a woman was introduced to the full knowledge of women's business. Her views of the landscape and responsibilities were shaped by her experiences and she could now participate in the initiation of other younger women. She became known as Tukkupartapartanna – a woman of knowledge. It was at that time that the woman would gain more scars upon her arms and chest. After giving birth to several children, the older women would often be married off to much younger men of about 25 years of age. Eventually, they were often replaced by much younger women who they had to initiate into the ways of the family group, as well as teaching the young men their responsibilities of being husbands and fathers.

Ngamma Ngamaitya: Stout, older woman with large breasts, these older women would have shoulders, arms, stomachs and chests covered with mangkamangkarrana scars, and would have full knowledge of the Dreaming and Laws they needed to pass onto the next generation of young women. They were often mothers and grandmothers to many children, and the secrets of their totemic affiliations were passed down the female line, guaranteeing their spread far beyond the birth country of the women. The Elder women would often begin their preparations in the spring with the appearance of the Seven Sisters constellation – Mangkamankarranna, seven young women gathering food on the Womma (sky plain). Those seven young girls were promised wives but lived separately under the guidance of the Ngamma Ngamaitya.

The weddings of young women would usually take place in the late spring or early summer, at points distant from their home lands, because the various family groups gathered together in various places. Those gatherings of many different language and culture groups would comprise hundreds of people meeting in one place. The purposes of the gatherings were many: trade, settling of disputes, marriages, and the performance and exchanging of ceremonies, stories and law. The location of those "Rainbow Ceremonies" would rotate according to the time of the year, the location to be travelled to, the groups arriving, and a broader cycle that determined who would host the gathering, where and when.

=== Peramangk men ===
Like the women, Peramangk men passed through five different stages of life as they aged. From birth to death, each major milestone of their lives was marked with a ceremony that brought them into the next stage of their lives.

Kurkurra: In the earliest stage of a boy's life, he was known as a Kurkurra, an uninitiated boy. From birth until the age of about 10-12, he was relatively free of restrictions, living with his mother or his mother's sisters, and was raised amongst the women of the family, accompanying them on their daily tasks. That carefree life was perhaps the only time where he was allows to do as he pleased. He would watch the older boys and men, and imitate their activities with games designed to hone many of the skills he would need in later life. Those included using the kutpe (a toy spear), hunting, tracking, food gathering and imitating the dancers in the ceremonies that were performed by the older men.

Wilya Kundarti: At the age of puberty, or just before, a Peramangk boy was introduced to the intermediate stage of life. At about the age of 11-13 he would undergo his first initiation ceremony, the Wilya Kudnarti. Surrounded by elder men and women of his family the boy was gently beaten with new growth branches of eucalyptus leaves. Then, grabbed by his elders, the boy was placed on a bed of gum leaves and one of the senior men would make cuts on his own arm allowing the blood to cover his whole body. Once that stage was completed, the boy was allowed to carry a wirri for killing birds, and a small wooden spade (karko) for digging grubs out of the ground.

Once the boys had reached that stage, preparations would be made for their full initiation into the world of adults, but that would not be done by their immediate family elders or in their own country. The next stage of their lives would be undertaken at the next Rainbow Ceremony where the boys, along with their umbilical cord trade partners, would be initiated into the mysteries of early adulthood.

Marnitti (Becoming a Milta): After the settling of disputes, and before the performing of various dances of the Kombokuri, the Elder men and women met to discuss who would be initiated into adulthood, with both young girls and boys selected for initiation from the meeting groups. The Elder men (usually the mother's male relatives) of the visiting family or culture group, undertook the Marnitti ceremony early in the morning. Edward John Eyre recorded the holding of a Marnitti Initiation ceremony and his thoughtful observations are worth quoting at length:

Early in the morning some of the male friends of the boy about to be operated upon, go behind him to seize him, upon which he sets off running as hard as he can, as if to escape; but being followed by his pursuers is soon captured and thrown down; he is then raised up and surrounded by several natives, who hold him and smear him from head to foot, with red ochre and grease; during this part of the ceremony, a band of elderly women, generally the mother and other near relatives, surround the group, crying or lamenting, and lacerating their thighs and backs with shells or flints, until the blood streams down. When well ochred (milte) all over the novice is led away by another native, apart from the rest of the tribe, or if there are more than one, they stand together linked hand in hand, and when tired sit down upon bunches of green boughs brought for that purpose, for they are neither allowed to sit on the ground, nor to have any clothing on; and when they move about they always carry a bunch of green boughs in each hand. (Wilyakundarti)

They are now ready for the ceremony ... Three men then got up and seated themselves at the foot of the three spears, with their legs crossed ... Two other natives then went over ... to where the three novices stood shaking and trembling ... seizing them by the legs and shoulders, and carefully lifting them from the ground, they carried each in turn, and laid them on their backs at full length upon green boughs, spread upon the ground in front of the three men sitting by the spears, so that the head of each rested on the lap of one of the three. From the moment of their being seized, they resolutely closed their eyes, and pretended to be in a deep trance until the whole was over. When all three novices had been laid in their proper position, cloaks were thrown over them ... [members of the family] coming to the side of each, carefully lifted up a portion of the covering and commenced plucking the hair.

At intervals, the operators were relieved by others of both sexes, and of various ages; little children under ten, were sometimes but not frequently officiating. When all the hair had been pulled out, that belonging to each native was carefully rolled up in green boughs, the three lots being put together, and given to one of the wise or inspired men to be put properly away; bunches of green boughs were now placed under each arm of the boys as also in their hands, after which several natives took hold of them, and raised them suddenly and simultaneously to their feet, whilst a loud guttural, ‘Whaugh’, was uttered by the other natives around.

They were then disenchanted and the ceremony was over, but for some time afterwards, the initiated are obliged to sleep away from the camp, and are not allowed to see the women; their heads and bodies are kept smeared with red ochre and grease (marnitti), and tufts of feathers (Karaki-woppa), and kangaroo teeth (teryarkoo), are worn tied to the hair in front.

— Edward John Eyre 1844

It was after that ceremony that the young man began to live as an adult, and was taught what he needed to know to become a full member of adult society. He lived apart from the rest of the family with the older men and was taken on many trips around the country, learning about its resources, its stories and other knowledge important to daily physical and spiritual life. At that stage in his life he was known as a "Ngarilda", a young unmarried man. After a time he might once again mix in the company of the women of the group and could have girlfriends, (indeed he was encouraged to). His future wife was chosen from amongst the older women but he was not allowed to marry her until after his final initiation stage.

Wilyaru: At about the age of twenty, a Peramangk man was ready to undergo his final initiation into full adulthood. He would be taken off to a sacred place far from the main camps of his family group and would be tattooed (Mangka Bakkendi - to make incisions in the body) across his shoulders and chest with a sharpened, sacred piece of rock crystal (Kauwemuka: large rock crystal which Aboriginal men conceal from women and young men until the latter are tattooed the last time, which ceremony is performed with small splinters of the rock crystal). Eyre described the various stages of that long and painful process, during which time the young man would live apart from his family and travel o all the different places sacred to his people.

The fourth stage (Wilyaru) is entered about the age of twenty, when the back, shoulders, arms and chest, are tattooed. He is called ngulte at the time of the operation; yellambambettu, when the incisions have begun to discharge pus; tarkange, when the sores are just healed; mangkauitya, at the time the cuts begin to rise; and bartamu, when the scars are at their highest elevation. Each tribe has a distinctive mode of making their incisions.

— Edward John Eyre 1844

One place we know that Peramangk men underwent their Wilyaru ceremony was at Woodchester Falls. That location was sacred not only to the Peramangk, but to the Ngarrindjeri and the Kaurna as well. Other sacred places for Wilyaru ceremonies were at the falls at the head of Salt Creek and at Waterfall Gully. The scars received by the Peramangk men were three "chevron" tattoos across the shoulder blades, chest and upper arm (Mangka: elevated scars on the chest or back produced by incisions or tattooing; raised scars on chest and back from initiation). Those scars signified to all observers that the person was a fully initiated man with all the rights and responsibilities that went with it.

Between the end of this ceremony and usually before the age of 25, the Wilyaru man would take a wife. Often she was a much older woman who would either be a widow, or the divorced wife of another man. She would often have children that the new husband (Yerlinna ), would have to care for and help raise. He did not do that alone, but having such responsibilities taught him about the care needed to raise a family (Ngadla : Step-father). A man who could not properly provide for his new family had little chance of gaining further, younger wives in the future.

Burka: The fifth and final stage of a man's life progress came with greater maturity, long after he had attained his Wilyaru status. By then he was an older man, usually with two or more wives and several children (Yerlitta/Father). A Burka man was often seen as the head of his family and an elder of great knowledge, who could be called upon to mediate in disputes between individuals and different family and culture groups. He would arrange marriages, set and conduct initiation ceremonies of the group's younger members, lead songs and dances at the Kombo-Kuris, and negotiate travels through another group's country.

It was a sign of a Burka man's power that he was able to provide for his family, and that was reflected in the number of wives and children he was able to support. Often a Burka's wives would be much younger than himself, their marriages to him having been arranged at a Rainbow ceremony not long after their birth. Peramangk Burka men like Parruwonggaburka ("King John"), had responsibility and traditional ownership over at tract of land (pangkara). John's country extended from Mypolonga to Echunga, and he was the traditional custodian of the Dreaming Lore for that pangkara. Parruwonggaburka was the father of Monarta who married John Mason. With his death, the ownership of the land passed to a responsible male relative.

Yammaiamma or Nurrullurrulla: There was another, much rarer stage for some Peramangk men. At the time of European invasion, some Peramangk people had reputations as powerful workers of magic. The early record of European settlers such as Cawthorne, Bull and Schurmann, make note of the fear that was engendered in neighbouring groups by the powers of Peramangk "Sorcerers" (sic). It was a rare and puissant individual who became a Yammaiamma or Nurrullurrulla (Sorcerer). The Peramangk shared much magical lore with their northern cousins the Ngadjuri, even if they did not see eye to eye on other religious matters. Barney Waria, a senior Ngadjuri Elder, speaking to Ronald Berndt in 1944, talked at great length about the creation of a "Mindaba" (Yammaaimma/Nurrullurrulla) man and the powers and responsibilities that he wielded:

Traditionally, several years after a young man's wilyaru, and if he had shown considerable interest in magical matters, a Mindaba with some of his colleagues would take him out into the bush ... Here the postulant was red-ochred and smeared all over with fat ... The Mindaba taught him how to bring on a situation of trance and, in that context, to talk with spirits. He was also informed about various forms of magical healing and sorcery and, especially, how to control his own spirit, how to make it leave his body during a trance. Further, he would be instructed in the art of divination during an inquest that took place after a person's death, to discover who was magically responsible.

— Barney Waria 1944 & Ronald M Berndt 1986

== See also ==
- Wiljani Conservation Park

== Sources ==
- Angas, G.F. (1847) Savage Life and Scenes in Australia and New Zealand, London, Smith, Elder & Co.
- Blair, A.E.J. (19??) Aboriginal Art At Lofty Heights, Adelaide, University of South Australia.
- Cawthorne, W.A. (1844–46) Diaries & Notes, Sydney, Mitchell Library.
- Coles R.B., & Draper N. (1988) Aboriginal History and Recently Discovered Art in the Mount Lofty Ranges, Gumeracha, Torrens Valley Historical Journal.
- Teichelmann, CG, 1841, Illustrative and Explanatory Notes of the Manners, Customs, Habits and Superstitions of the Natives of South Australia, Adelaide, Committee of the South Australian Wesleyan Methodist Auxiliary Missionary Society.
- Teichelman, CG., & Schürmann, CW, 1841, Outlines of a Grammar, Vocabulary, and Phraseology of the Aboriginal Language of South Australia. Adelaide, Committee of the South Australian Wesleyan Methodist Auxiliary Missionary Society.
