= Apamurra, South Australia =

Apamurra South Australia
- Coordinates: 34°51′37″S 139°12′26″E
- Population: 11 (SAL 2021)
- Postcode(s): 5237
- Elevation: 158 m (518 ft)
- Location: 38 km (24 mi) north of Murray Bridge
- LGA(s): Mid Murray Council
Localities around Apamurra:
Milendella		Frayville
Palmer	Apamurra	Mannum
	Tepko

Apamurra is a locality in the Murray Mallee between the Mount Lofty Ranges and the Murray River in South Australia.

== Description ==
Apamurra was a station and siding on the Sedan railway line. The last train left the Apamurra silos in 2005.

Its name is derived from an Aboriginal name for fresh water.

A mural was created on a section of a pipeline in Apamurra. It was the first serious pipeline mural in South Australia.
