= Monarto South railway station =

Former railway station in South Australia, Australia

Monarto South
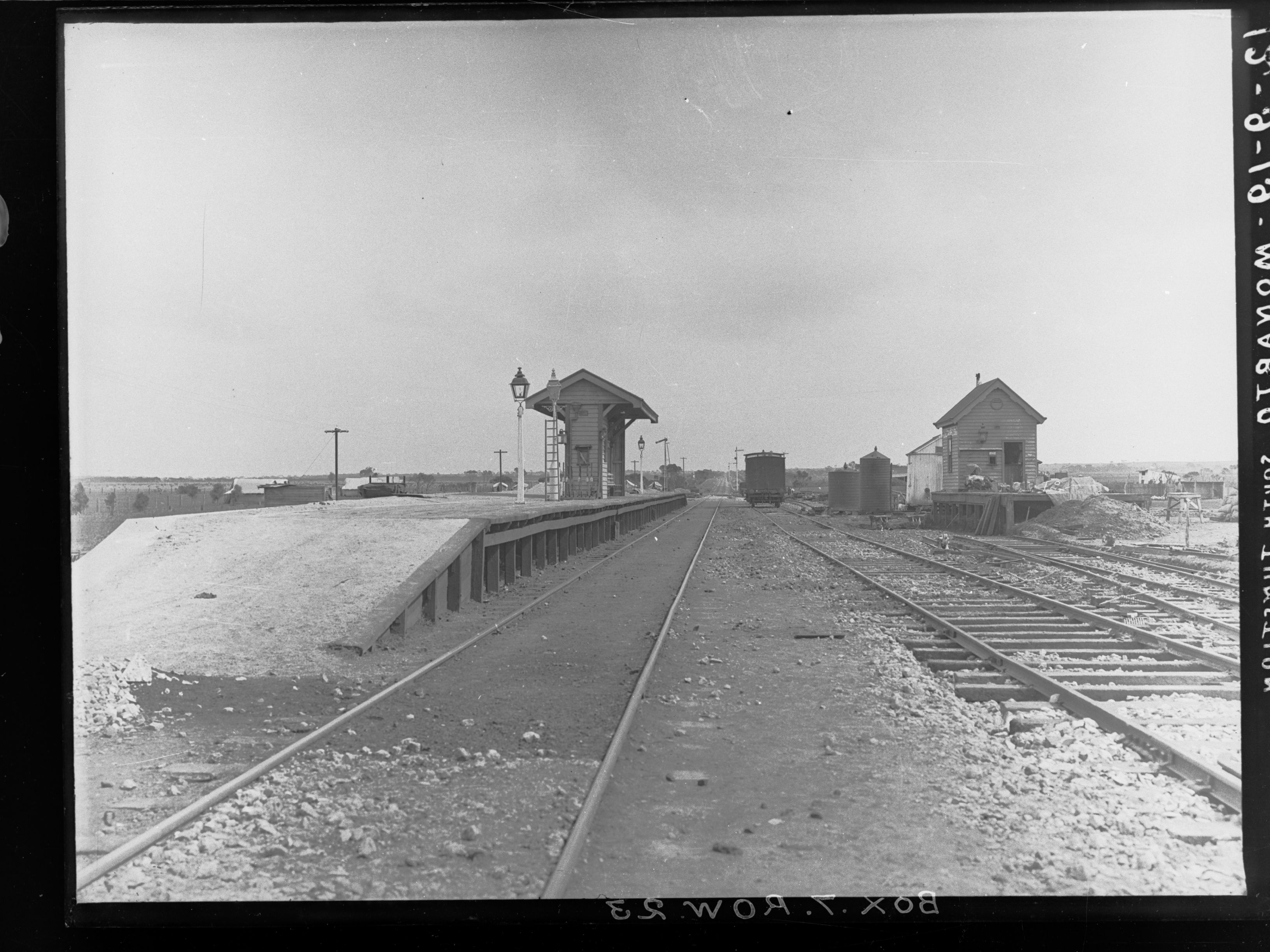
- Monarto South railway station, looking east towards Melbourne on 12 September 1919.

General information
- Coordinates: 35.12369°S 139.12708°E
- System: Former Australian National regional rail
- Operator: Australian National
- Lines: Adelaide-Wolseley; Sedan
- Distance: 82.2 kilometres from Adelaide
- Platforms: 2 (1 island)
- Tracks: 4

Construction
- Structure type: Ground

Other information
- Status: Closed

History
- Opened: 1 May 1886

Services
Preceding station	Australian Rail Track Corporation	Following station
Callington towards Adelaide	Adelaide–Wolseley railway line	Murray Bridge towards Serviceton
Preceding station	South Australian Railways	Following station
Terminus	Sedan railway line	Pallamana towards Sedan
Location

Monarto South railway station was located on the Adelaide to Wolseley line serving the South Australian town of Monarto South. It was the junction of the Sedan and Wolseley lines.

== History ==
The railway station opened on 1 May 1886, following the extension of Adelaide-Wolseley railway line to Bordertown. On 13 October 1919, Monarto South became a junction station with the opening of the Sedan line. It briefly became a break of gauge station in 1995 when the Adelaide to Wolseley line was gauge converted to standard gauge. This ceased when the Sedan line was also converted as far as its then terminus at Apamurra in November 1995. After standardisation, the station was demolished with the station building being preserved at the Old Tailem Town Pioneer Village. The yard used for grain trains have fallen into disuse and trucks now transport grain from the silos, but a 1,550 metre crossing loop remains in use.
