= Angas Valley, South Australia =

Angas Valley South Australia
- Coordinates: 34.75°S 139.31°E
- Population: 52 (SAL 2021)
- Postcode(s): 5238
- Location: 26 km (16 mi) east of Mount Pleasant; 26 km (16 mi) west of Walker Flat
- LGA(s): Mid Murray Council
- State electorate(s): Schubert
- Federal division(s): Barker
Localities around Angas Valley:
	Cambrai
Sanderston	Angas Valley
Milendella	Punthari	Mannum

Angas Valley is a small town in the Mid Murray Council on the plains between the Mount Lofty Ranges and the Murray River. It is on the road between Mount Pleasant in the ranges and Walker Flat on the Murray. There are no shops in the town, but there is a community hall and tennis courts. There had previously been a school, which operated from 1891 to 1928. Angas Valley Post Office opened in April 1886, became a receiving office in January 1910, and closed in August 1917.
