= Wiljani Conservation Park =

Protected area in South Australia

- IUCN category III (natural monument or feature)
- Location within South Australia
- Location: South Australia
- Nearest city: Mount Pleasant
- Coordinates: 34°45′05″S 139°01′27″E
- Area: 1.8 km^{2} (0.69 sq mi)
- Established: 25 February 2016
- Governing body: Department for Environment and Water

Wiljani Conservation Park is a protected area in the Australian state of South Australia in the gazetted locality of Mount Pleasant located about 3.5 kilometres (2.2 mi) north-west of the town centre in Mount Pleasant.

It was proclaimed under the National Parks and Wildlife Act 1972 on 25 February 2016 in respect to a parcel of land in the cadastral unit of the Hundred of Para Wirra. The proclaimed land is not subject to access rights under the Mining Act 1971 or the Petroleum and Geothermal Energy Act 2000. As of December 2016, it covered an area of 1.8 square kilometres (0.69 sq mi).

Wiljani is a clan name, i.e. a family group, belonging to the Peramangk Aboriginal people who traditionally lived on the land within the vicinity of what is now the conservation park. The name was selected during 2015 after a process of “consultation and approval” involving the Peramangk people and the Department of Environment, Water and Natural Resources

The conservation park is classified as an IUCN Category VI protected area.

== See also ==
- Protected areas of South Australia
