= Caloote, South Australia =

Caloote South Australia
- Coordinates: 34°57′51″S 139°15′36″E
- Population: 133 (SAL 2021)
- Established: 1885
- Postcode(s): 5254
- LGA(s): Mid Murray Council; Rural City of Murray Bridge
- State electorate(s): Schubert; Hammond
- Federal division(s): Barker
Localities around Caloote:
	Mannum
Tepko	Caloote	Ponde
Pallamana	Mypolonga	Zadows Landing, Wall Flat

Caloote is a town and its surrounding locality on the right bank of the Murray River in the Mid Murray Council in South Australia. The southern extent of the locality is in the Rural City of Murray Bridge.

Caloote was developed as a private subdivision in 1885 by Carl C Rathmann.

A Citizens' Military Force training campsite was established at Caloote in the early 1950s.
