= Taunton, South Australia =

Taunton South Australia
- Coordinates: 34.69°S 139.09°E
- Population: 4 (2016 census)
- Postcode(s): 5235
- Location: 2 km (1 mi) north of Springton
- LGA(s): Barossa Council
- State electorate(s): Schubert
- Federal division(s): Barker
Localities around Taunton:
Eden Valley
Taunton
Springton

Taunton is a locality in the Eden Valley between Springton and Eden Valley in South Australia. It was originally created as a private subdivision of sections 560, 561, 568 and 569 in the Hundred of Jutland. The present boundaries were created for the long established name in May 2003. It now contains a few houses and a cemetery adjacent to Eden Valley Road / Route B10.
