= Peramangk language =

Pama–Nyungan language of South Australia

Peramangk
- Merildakald
- Region: South Australia, Mount Lofty Ranges
- Ethnicity: Peramangk
- Extinct: (date missing)
- Language family: Pama–Nyungan: Lower Murray? Thura-Yura?; Peramangk

Language codes
- ISO 639-3: None (mis)
- AIATSIS: S5

Peramangk, also known as Merildekald, is an extinct Pama-Nyungan language of the Peramangk lands in South Australia. Like its congener the Kaurna language, it was previously listed as endangered.

== History ==
Many Peramangk place names, cultural practices and dreamtime character names are well known. A proportion of the vocabulary and grammatical elements of the language may potentially be shared with Kaurna language as well as Nganguruku language, and to some extent the Ngarrindjeri and Ngadjuri languages among others. Some elements of the Peramangk language may be considered distinctive from Kaurna. Peramangk language may be held dear by Peramangk elders, and hence it was cited that a Peramangk descendant is collecting and compiling language data, with the assistance of a local linguist. It is likely that Peramangk elders knew each of the surrounding languages, as surrounding tribes often met on Peramangk land at their invitation.

A work compiled by The Lutheran Missionary Society within a short period after colonisation of mainland South Australia constitutes a reference manual for the Kaurna language and hence also for aspects of the Peramangk language, and the content of an available downloadable version is entirely searchable by text so serving as a handy resource for all ages. It should be noted, however, that the works' focus on the Kaurna language, rather than the Peramangk language means that attempts to use this to reconstruct Peramangk are limited.
