= Sedan railway line =

Railway line in Australia

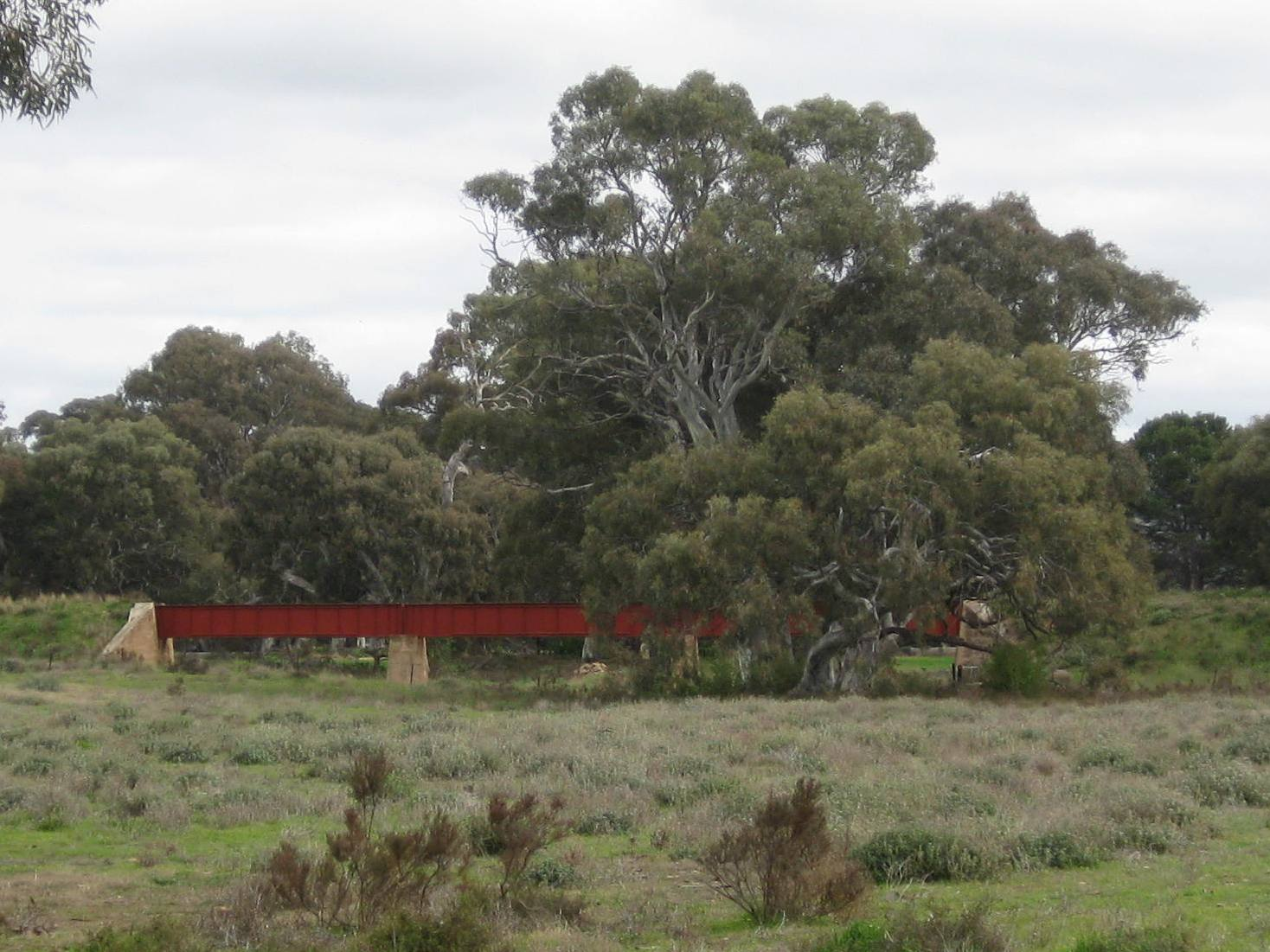
- Former railway bridge at Cambrai

Overview
- Status: Partially closed and removed, remaining section dormant
- Termini: Monarto South; Sedan
- Continues from: Adelaide-Wolseley line
- Stations: 8

Service
- Operator(s): South Australian Railways; Australian National; Genesee & Wyoming Australia

History
- Opened: 13 October 1919
- Closed: Cambrai-Sedan: 1 June 1964; Apamurra-Cambrai: 9 October 1987; Monarto South-Apamurra: 2005

Technical
- Line length: 69.7 km (43.3 mi)
- Track gauge: 1,435 mm (4 ft 8 1/2 in) (from 1995)
- Old gauge: 1,600 mm (5 ft 3 in)

The Sedan railway line was a railway line on the South Australian Railways network. It branched off from the South Australian Railways' Adelaide to Wolseley line at Monarto South running 70 kilometres north to Sedan.

== History ==
The Sedan line opened from Monarto South to Sedan on 13 October 1919. The original stations were at Pallamana, Tepko, Apamurra, Milendella, Sanderston, Kanappa, Cambrai, and Sedan, with station buildings and livestock loading facilities at Appamurra, Cambrai and Sedan.

On 1 June 1964, the line was curtailed to Cambrai, briefly reopening in 1967 to assist in the construction of the Swan Reach to Sedan pipeline. The line was cut back further to Apamurra on 9 October 1987 and the line north of Apamurra was abandoned. In August 1995, work commenced to gauge convert the line south of Apamurra to standard gauge. In 2001, parts of the line between Apamurra and Cambrai were removed by the Pichi Richi Railway Preservation Society for use on its Stirling North to Port Augusta line. The line reopened on 20 November 1995. The railway line closed in 2005 due to poor track conditions.

== Present day ==
The line's current owner Aurizon does not list the line as being open but it is available for access. The line has fallen into disrepair, being severed at several points for drainage and road surface improvements.
