= Springton, South Australia =

Springton South Australia
- Coordinates: 34.7085°S 139.0901°E
- Population: 398 (UCL 2021)
- Postcode(s): 5235
- Location: 20 km (12 mi) E of Williamstown
- LGA(s): Barossa Council
- State electorate(s): Schubert
- Federal division(s): Barker
Localities around Springton:
Flaxman Valley	Taunton, Eden Valley	Eden Valley
Mount Crawford	Springton	Sanderston
Mount Pleasant	Mount Pleasant	Milendella

Springton is a settlement in South Australia. It draws its name from Springs Dairy which was on the site before the town subdivision was surveyed.

There is a large hollow red gum tree on the outskirts of the town. This tree was used as the first home in South Australia of Friedrich Herbig when he migrated from Germany in 1855. He married three years later and his first two children were born in the tree before he built a hut nearby in 1860. The tree is known as the Herbig Family Tree.

Springton includes the former village of Friedensberg less than two kilometres south of the Springton township. The village had a Lutheran church (1861–1899), school (1861–1913) and cemetery. The building is now used as a museum. All of Friedrich Herbig's children and almost half of his grandchildren attended the school.

Another of the early pioneer families in the area was the Polden family, who also settled in the nearby Mount Pleasant and Mount Crawford areas from the 1840s.

Springton is in the Eden Valley wine region.
