= Sanderston, South Australia =

Sanderston South Australia
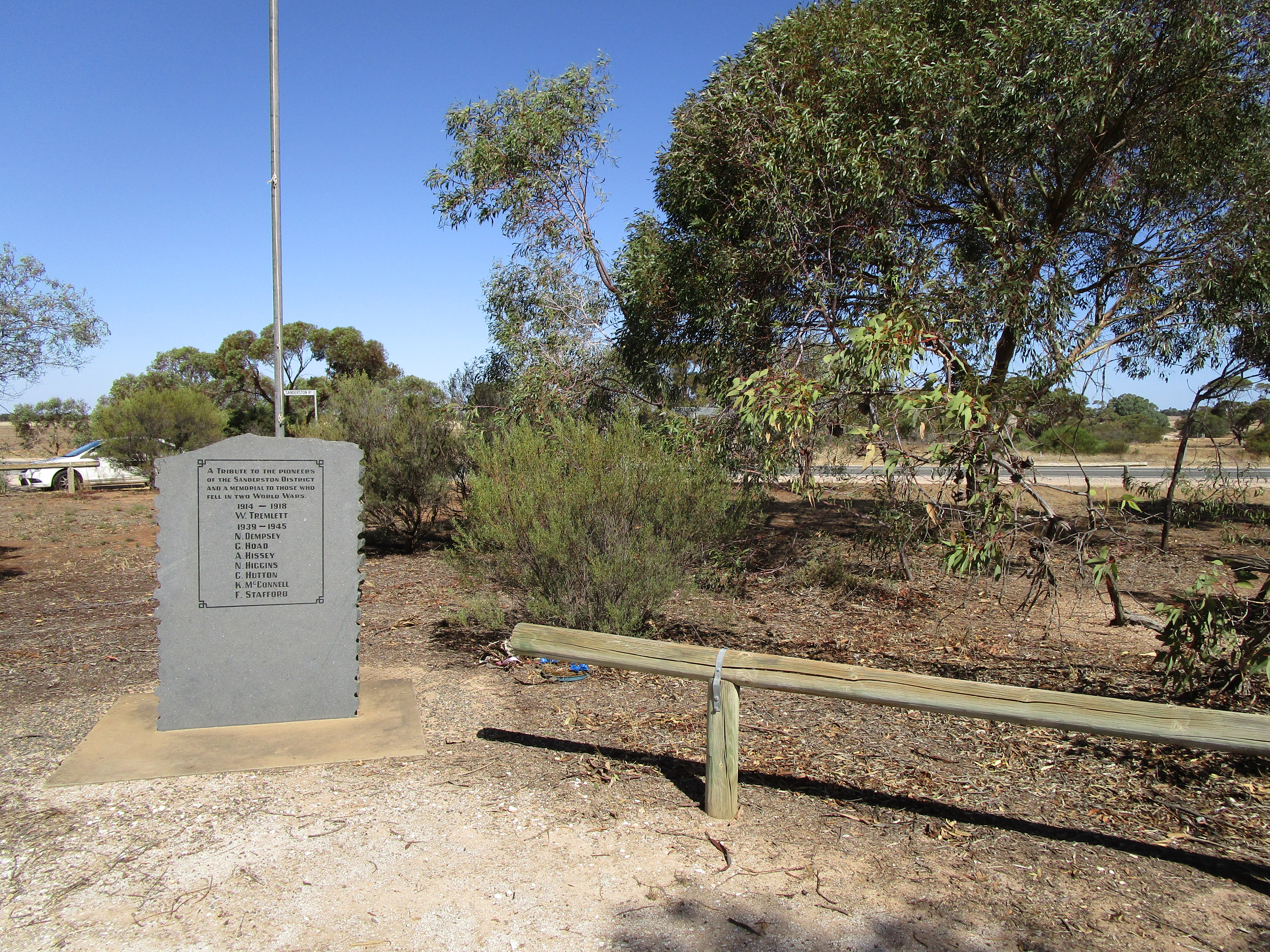
- Memorial in a reserve on the corner of Angas Valley Road and Sanderston Road

- Coordinates: 34.7545°S 139.2205°E
- Population: 79 (SAL 2021)
- Postcode(s): 5237
- Elevation: 154 m (505 ft)
- Location: 18 km (11 mi) east of Mount Pleasant; 50 km (31 mi) north of Murray Bridge
- LGA(s): Mid Murray Council
- State electorate(s): Electoral district of Schubert
- Federal division(s): Division of Barker
Localities around Sanderston:
Eden Valley	Cambrai
Springton	Sanderston	Angas Valley
	Milendella

Sanderston is a settlement in South Australia. It is at the foot of the eastern slopes of the Mount Lofty Ranges.

The Baptist church building opened in 1905 but is now closed. The town once also had a store and post office.

Sanderston was located on the Sedan railway line until it was shortened to Apamurra in 1987.
