= Murray Bridge Airport =

- IATA: none; ICAO: YMBD

Summary
- Airport type: Private
- Operator: Antelco Pty Ltd.
- Location: Pallamana near Murray Bridge
- Elevation AMSL: 180 ft / 55 m
- Coordinates: 35°03′51″S 139°13′35″E

Map
- Location in South Australia

Runways
Direction	Length		Surface
Direction	m	ft	Surface
01/19	1,065	3,494	Gravel
09/27	920	3,018	Grass
- Sources: AIP

Murray Bridge Airport (ICAO: YMBD) is in the locality of Pallamana, 5 nautical miles (9.3 km; 5.8 mi) northwest of Murray Bridge in South Australia. It is situated on Reedy Creek Road and is also known as Pallamana Aerodrome or Pallamanna Airfield. Avgas is available from a 24H Credit Card swipe Bowser.

== Runways ==
It has two runways:

- 02/20 is asphalt and is 1,065 m (3,494 ft) long.
- 09/27 is grass and is 920 m (3,018 ft) long.

== Flying schools ==
There is one general aviation (GA) flying school, Murray Bridge Flying School, which offers training PPL, Night VFR, IFR, CPL, Instructors ratings as well as various ground theory courses. Its fleet includes multiple 4-seat light aircraft such as the Piper Archer and Cessna 172 as well as twin engine aircraft such as the Beechcraft Baron.

There are also two ultralight aircraft (Recreational Aviation Australia) flying schools: 'Recreational Pilots Academy' and 'Murray Bridge Light Aircraft Flying School'.

The Murray Bridge Gliding Club Inc. is based in Hangar 19 and offers motor glider hire.

== See also ==
- List of airports in South Australia
