= Pallamana, South Australia =

Pallamana
- Town
- Coordinates: 35.034°S 139.21°E
- Country: Australia
- State: South Australia
- LGA: Rural City of Murray Bridge
- Location: 12 km (7.5 mi) northwest of Murray Bridge; 21 km (13 mi) south of Palmer

Government
  - State electorate: Hammond
  - Federal division: Barker
- Elevation: 69 m (226 ft)

Population
  - Total: 68 (SAL 2021)
- Postcode: 5254
- Mean max temp: 23.3 °C (73.9 °F)
- Mean min temp: 9.1 °C (48.4 °F)
- Annual rainfall: 301.0 mm (11.85 in)
Localities around Pallamana
Rockleigh	Tepko	Caloote
	Pallamana	Mypolonga
Monarto	Rocky Gully	Murray Bridge North

Pallamana is a locality in the Murraylands region of South Australia between the Mount Lofty Ranges and the Murray River, northwest of Murray Bridge.

== Transport ==
Pallamana is where the former Sedan railway line crosses Reedy Creek Road (state route B35) which connects Palmer to Murray Bridge. The former station/siding was originally named Preamimma Railway Station.

The Murray Bridge Airport is in the southeast of the locality of Pallamana. Another airfield named Rollo's Airfield (ICAO: YRLO) is on the western side of Pallamana.

== Climate ==
Pallamana has a semi-arid climate with mediterranean influences (Köppen: BSk/Csa) with warm to hot, dry summers and mild, slightly wet winters. The wettest recorded day was 14 February 2014 with 74.6 mm (2.94 in) of rainfall. Extreme temperatures ranged from 48.1 °C (118.6 °F) on 20 December 2019 to −4.6 °C (23.7 °F) on 20 July 2015.

Climate data for Pallamana Aerodrome (35.07°S 139.23°E) (45 m (148 ft) AMSL) (2006-2025)
Month	Jan	Feb	Mar	Apr	May	Jun	Jul	Aug	Sep	Oct	Nov	Dec	Year
Record high °C (°F)	48.0 (118.4)	46.7 (116.1)	42.6 (108.7)	39.0 (102.2)	30.7 (87.3)	23.7 (74.7)	26.9 (80.4)	31.0 (87.8)	35.2 (95.4)	39.2 (102.6)	45.3 (113.5)	48.1 (118.6)	48.1 (118.6)
Mean daily maximum °C (°F)	30.5 (86.9)	29.6 (85.3)	27.6 (81.7)	23.5 (74.3)	19.3 (66.7)	16.1 (61.0)	15.7 (60.3)	17.3 (63.1)	20.4 (68.7)	23.9 (75.0)	26.5 (79.7)	28.8 (83.8)	23.3 (73.9)
Mean daily minimum °C (°F)	14.5 (58.1)	14.1 (57.4)	12.5 (54.5)	9.5 (49.1)	7.2 (45.0)	5.3 (41.5)	4.7 (40.5)	4.6 (40.3)	5.4 (41.7)	7.7 (45.9)	10.7 (51.3)	12.5 (54.5)	9.1 (48.3)
Record low °C (°F)	6.9 (44.4)	5.2 (41.4)	3.1 (37.6)	−0.2 (31.6)	−4.1 (24.6)	−4.1 (24.6)	−4.6 (23.7)	−4.4 (24.1)	−3.1 (26.4)	−1.1 (30.0)	1.7 (35.1)	2.6 (36.7)	−4.6 (23.7)
Average precipitation mm (inches)	15.2 (0.60)	16.3 (0.64)	15.8 (0.62)	23.1 (0.91)	29.2 (1.15)	31.9 (1.26)	33.1 (1.30)	28.7 (1.13)	31.9 (1.26)	23.1 (0.91)	28.1 (1.11)	24.2 (0.95)	301.0 (11.85)
Average precipitation days (≥ 0.2 mm)	4.4	4.0	5.6	8.3	11.7	13.9	15.3	13.4	11.4	7.8	7.6	5.9	109.3
Source: Bureau of Meteorology (2006-2025)

== Solar farm proposal ==
RES Australia proposed to build a solar farm with up to 176 MW capacity and a battery storage facility at Pallamana, south of the Murray Bridge airport, on a 730 hectares (1800 acres) open farmland site. Construction was to start in 2020 but as of December 2023 work had not started.
