= Tepko, South Australia =

Tepko South Australia
- Coordinates: 34.97°S 139.19°E
- Population: 31 (SAL 2021)
- Postcode(s): 5254
- Elevation: 109 m (358 ft)
- Location: 20 km (12 mi) northwest of Murray Bridge
- LGA(s): Mid Murray Council; Rural City of Murray Bridge
- State electorate(s): Hammond (2018)
- Federal division(s): Barker
Localities around Tepko:
Palmer		Mannum
Rockleigh	Tepko	Caloote
	Pallamana

Tepko is a locality in the Murray Mallee between the Mount Lofty Ranges and the Murray River in South Australia.

Its name is derived from an Aboriginal name for a hill. It spans the boundary between the Mid Murray Council and the Rural City of Murray Bridge.

Tepko was a stop on the Sedan railway line. The last grain train went through the town in 2005.

As the Heywood interconnector goes past Tepko, a $750 million gas power plant was proposed in 2010 for the area, though was never built. A 240 MW four-hour grid battery is being built for 2027 at Summerfield.
