= Milendella, South Australia =

Milendella South Australia
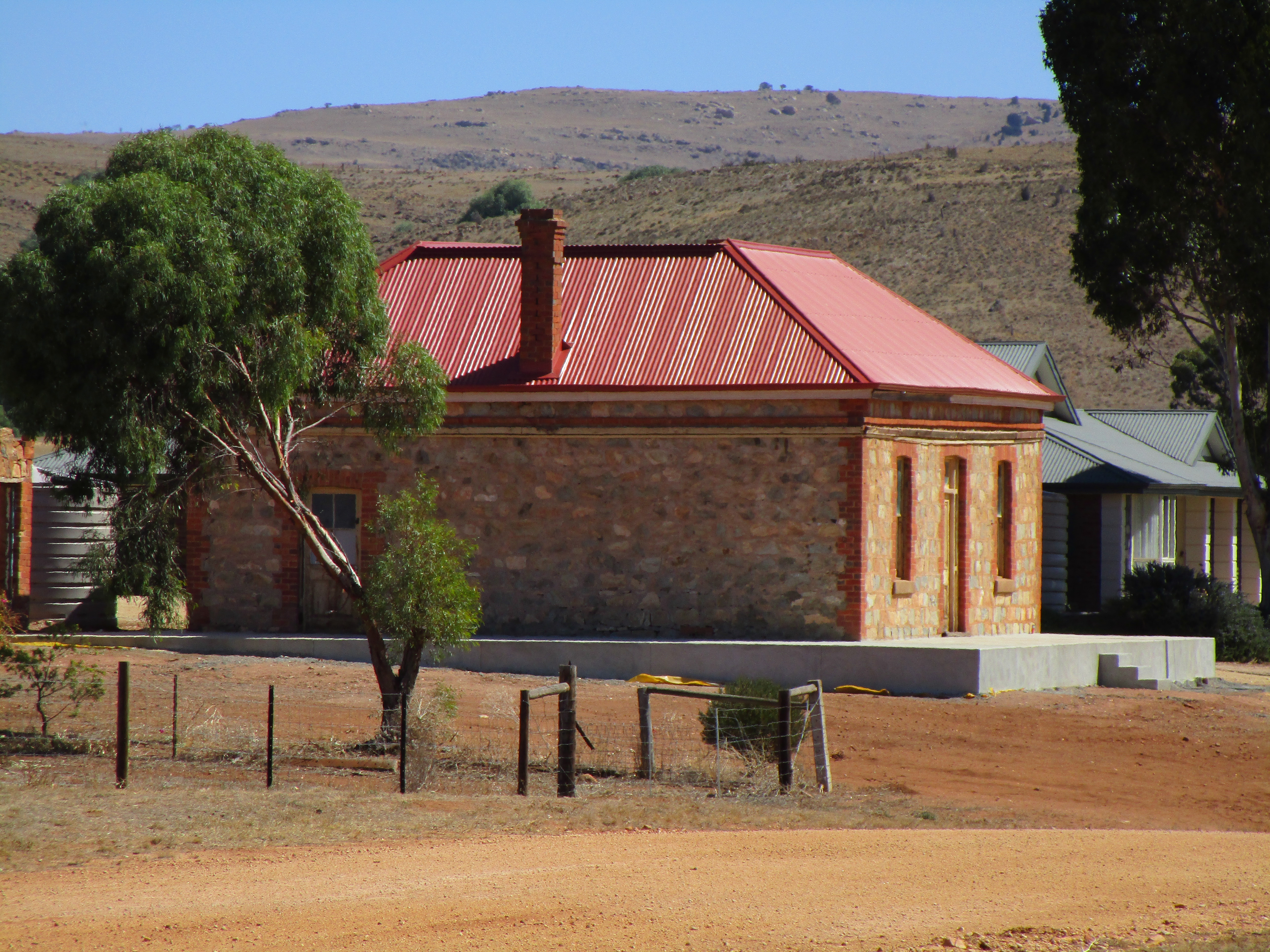
- old building on Church Road in Milendella

- Coordinates: 34.80°S 139.21°E
- Population: 56 (SAL 2021)
- Established: 1881
- Postcode(s): 5237
- Elevation: 162 m (531 ft)
- LGA(s): Mid Murray Council
- State electorate(s): Hammond
- Federal division(s): Barker
Localities around Milendella:
Springton	Sanderston	Angas Valley
Mount Pleasant	Milendella	Punthari
Palmer	Apamurra	Frayville

Milendella is a locality on the plains to the east of the Mount Lofty Ranges in South Australia. The name was the native name of Emu Creek which runs through the locality.

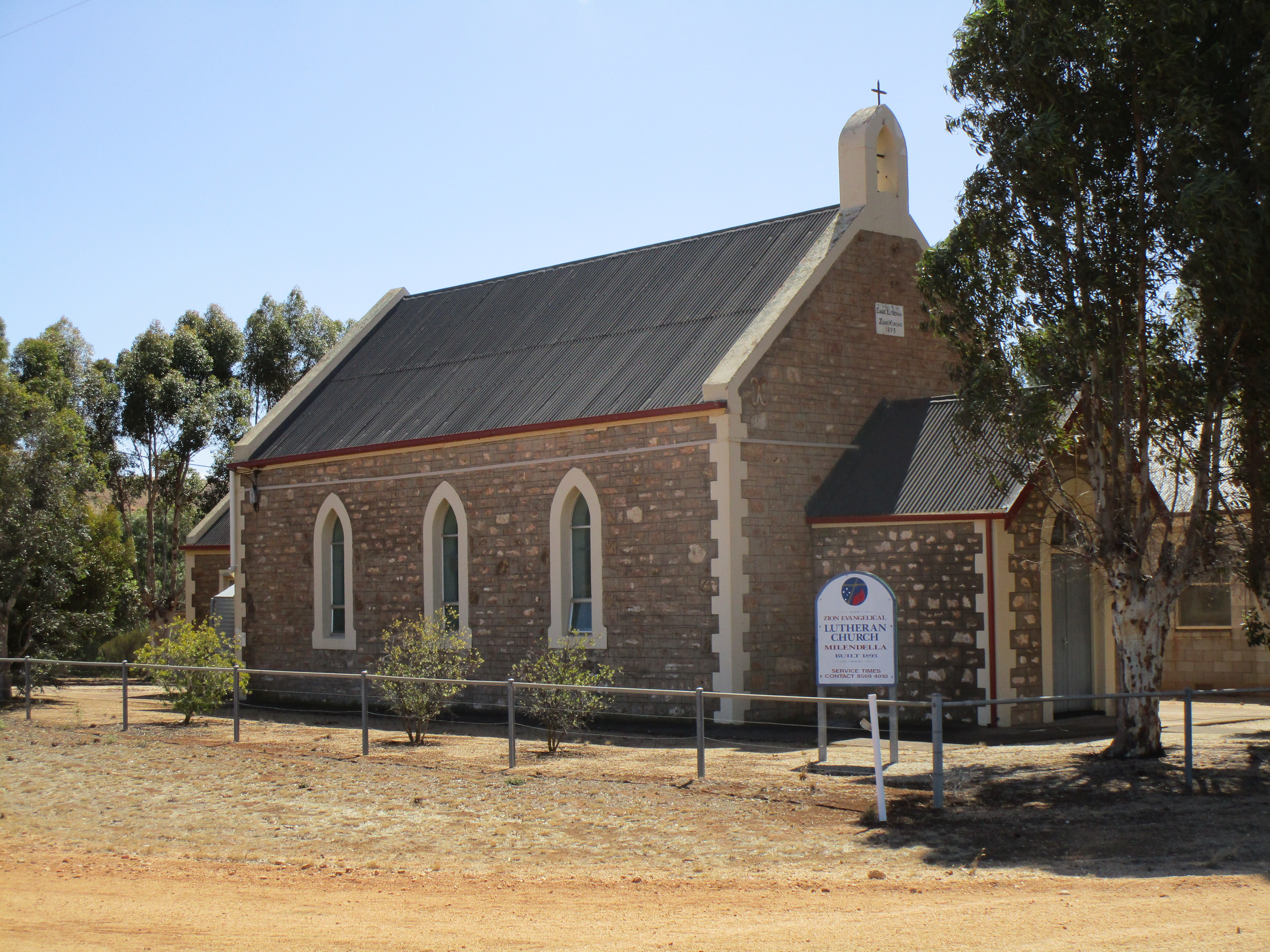
Milendella Lutheran Church in 2018

Milendella was first settled by German immigrant families in the 1880s. The Lutheran church was built in 1893. The town once had a church, general store, post office, school and railway station. Zion Evangelical Lutheran Church continues to meet monthly.

Milendella was once a stop on the Sedan railway line until it was closed in 1987. The name Milendella was approved by the state Nomenclature Committee in 1917 in advance of the railway opening in 1919.

Milendella includes the former Government Town of Bonython which was surveyed in 1890 and named after Sir John Langdon Bonython.
