= Mannum =

- Town
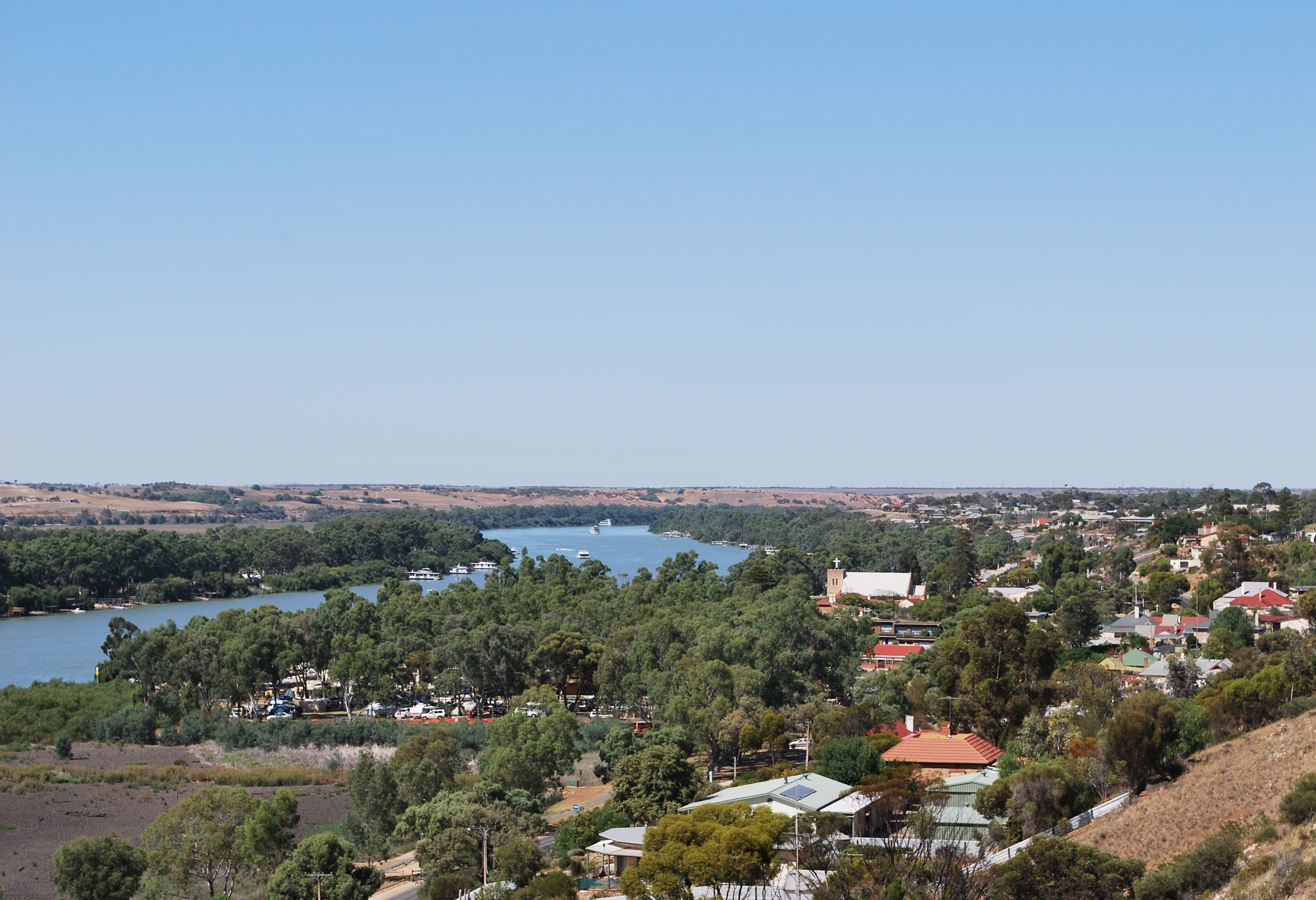
- Mannum as seen from a nearby lookout

- Coordinates: 34°54′55″S 139°18′16″E
- Country: Australia
- State: South Australia
- LGA: Mid Murray Council
- Location: 84 km (52 mi) from Adelaide
- Established: 1854

Government
  - State electorate: Hammond
  - Federal division: Barker

Population
  - Total: 2,537 (UCL 2021)
- Time zone: UTC+9:30 (ACST)
  - Summer (DST): UTC+10:30 (ACST)
- Postcode: 5238
- Localities around Mannum
Angas Valley	Cambrai	Black Hill
Punthari Frayville Apamurra	Mannum	Walker Flat
Palmer	Tepko Caloote Ponde Cowirra	Younghusband

Mannum is an historic town on the west bank of the Murray River in South Australia, 84 kilometres (52 mi) east of Adelaide. Mannum is the seat of the Mid Murray Council, and is situated in the state electoral district of Hammond and the federal Division of Barker.

== History ==
The Aboriginal inhabitants and traditional owners of the vicinity now called Mannum were the Nganguruku (Nganguruga), part of the larger Ngayawung community. In 1830 the Sturt expedition passed through the area by boat.

No Europeans visited again until 25 January 1838 when the expedition of Dr George Imlay and John Hill, on horseback from Adelaide, became the first to reach the Murray overland within South Australia. They noted that the thriving Indigenous population were very keen fisherfolk.

The first European settlement in the area was in 1840. The first ship (a side-wheel paddle steamer) built on the Murray River was launched at Mannum by William Randell in 1852. A shipbuilding industry continued in Mannum until into the 20th century. William Randell is memorialised by the preservation of the rectangular boiler from the paddle wheeler Mary Ann in the town's recreation park. His dry dock held the Marion, an 1897 built paddle wheeler; managed by the National Trust of South Australia as a museum. The Marion left active service in 1950 and spent until 1963 as a boarding house. The Marion was recommissioned in 1994 and currently operates as a daytrip and overnight cruising vessel along the Murray.

A number of other manufacturing industries were established in the town, and some continue; although not as large as they once were. The largest heavy manufacturing company was David Shearer (later Horwood-Bagshaw) which made farm equipment.

Mannum apparently has the distinction of having lost more men per head of population in both World Wars than any other town in South Australia. There is a song, called Year of the Drum, written by Wendy Joseph which describes the tragic effects of the World Wars on several generations of the people of Mannum and the use of music to entice young men to war. The song references Mannum, Shearers, Riverboats and the Murray River.

== Timeline ==
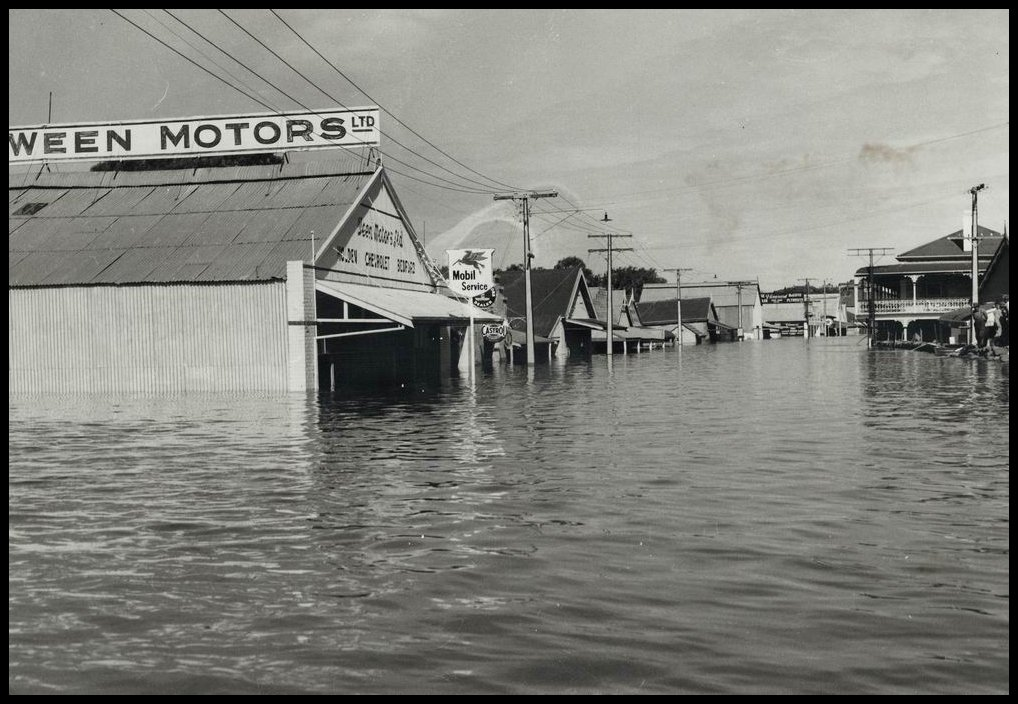
1956 flood in Mannum

Selected events in the history of Mannum.

- 1830, First Europeans visit – Charles Sturt expedition explores the Murray by boat.
- 1838, First Europeans arrive by land – expedition of Dr Imlay and John Hill.
- 1851, The first pastoral leases in the district are signed.
- 1853, Mannum becomes a port on the Murray and the Hundred of Mannum is declared.
- 1863, Mannum's first store, "Bogan store" is opened and run by Thomas Randell's wife.
- 1864, Port Mannum is surveyed under government direction.
- 1865, Mannum's post office opens although home mail delivery does not begin until 1949.
- 1869, A private port Mannum is surveyed.
- 1869, Bogan hotel is opened.
- 1870, Largest flood to date on the river.
- 1876, Walker's flour mill begins operations.
- 1877, District council of Mannum proclaimed. David Shearer begins a blacksmithing business.
- 1886, Murray Bridge declared a port taking away much of Mannum's river trade.
- 1902, Kerosene Street lighting installed, changed to acetylene in 1905 and electric in 1923
- 1906, First telephone installed, Automatic exchange installed in 1979.
- 1912, First paper, the Mannum Mercury, published, closing in 1917.
- 1921, The district hospital was built.
- 1925, Mannum technical school opened
- 1930, Mary Ann's boiler moved to the recreation ground.
- 1931, Highest flood since 1870.
- 1932, Main street renamed Randell Street.
- 1954, Mannum-Adelaide pipeline completed.
- 1956, Highest recorded floods at Mannum during the 1956 Murray River flood.
- 1963, The Marion reaches Mannum, her new home. She is recommissioned in 1994.
- 1997, District council of Mannum becomes part of the Mid-Murray district council.

== Heritage listings ==
Mannum has a number of heritage-listed sites, including:

- Anna Street: David Shearer's Dwelling and Observatory
- Cliff Street: Bleak House
- Noa No Road: Noa No Landing
- Randell Street: William Randell's Dry Dock
- 51-53 Randell Street: Shearer's Agricultural Implement Factory Site and Stamp Press Relics
- Reedy Creek Railway Bridge, off Western Boundary Road.

== Modern development ==
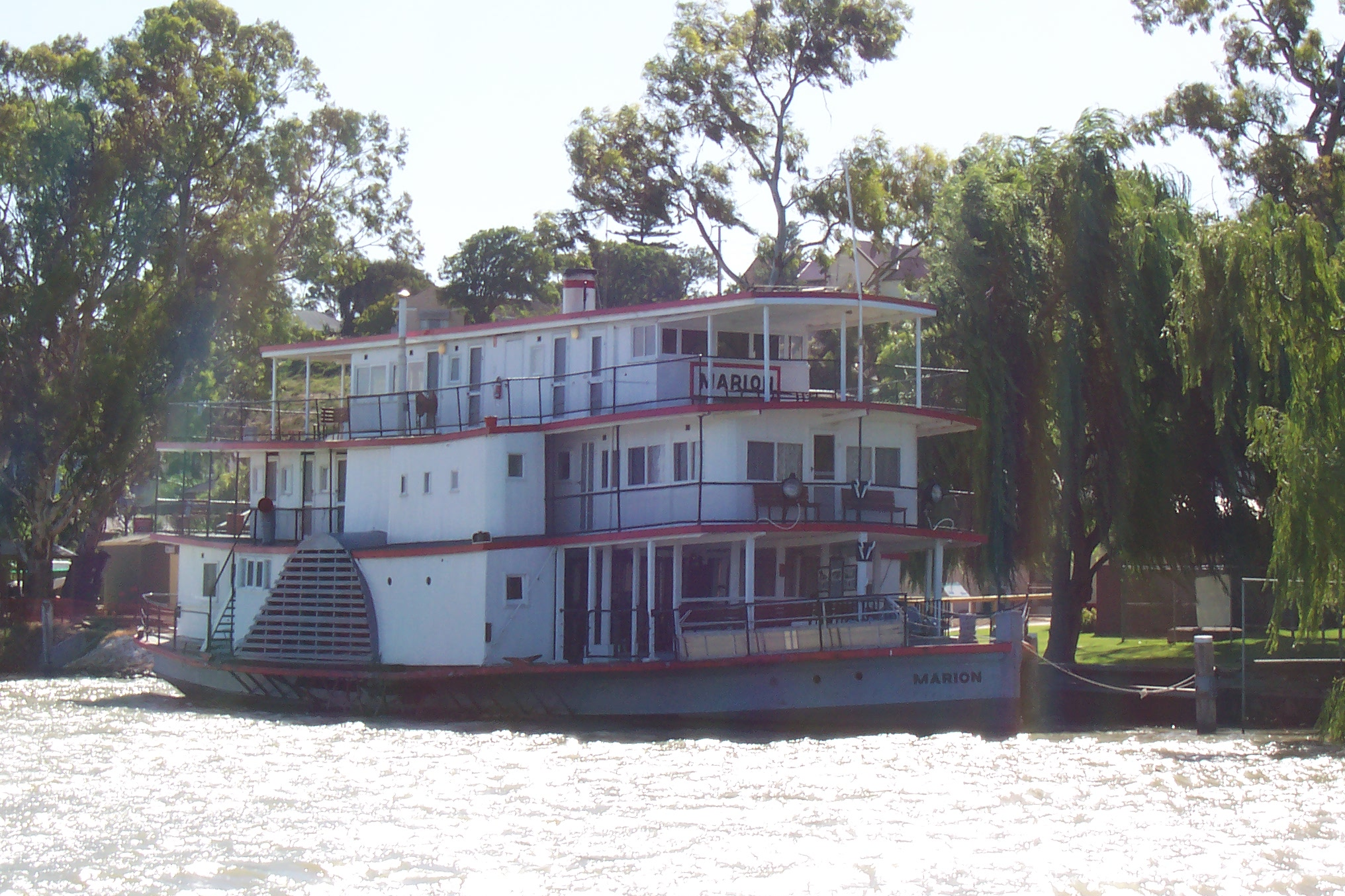
The PS Marion at Mannum

Mannum's significance as a river port declined with the railways reaching Morgan in 1878 and Murray Bridge in 1886. The largest ship operating on the Murray is the PS Murray Princess, a passenger stern-wheel paddle boat based at Mannum offering weekly cruises. The restored historic paddle steamer PS Marion is also based at Mannum and cruises several times a year. Before restoration, it was a static display in a drydock for many years. Mannum is also a base for houseboats available for hire. Because of its position on the Murray River; in 1954 the Mannum–Adelaide pipeline was built to help provide Adelaide with a reliable water supply.

Today, Mannum is a busy township and a popular tourist destination, particularly during the summer months. The population of Mannum and the surrounding area grows to about 10,000 when semi-residents (shack owners) and tourists are taken into consideration. The town has three hotels, a Foodland and IGA supermarket and many specialty shops.

The Catholic Church in Mannum is dedicated to Our Lady of Mount Carmel.

== Media ==
Mannum was home to the regional newspaper, the Mannum and District Recorder (2 June 1955 – 16 June 1960), which was then continued as the Murray Plains Recorder (13 January 1961 – 24 September 1964). It was then merged into The Leader which is still published in Angaston.

In the years around World War 1, another publication, the Mannum Mercury and Farmer's Journal (30 March 1912 – 2 March 1917), was also printed. It was then absorbed into The Mount Barker Courier and Onkaparinga and Gumeracha Advertiser. Later, the phrase "Mannum Mercury" was revived as the Mannum news page of the Murray Valley Standard.

== Sports and recreation ==
The town has an Australian Football team competing in the River Murray Football League; nicknamed the Roos.

The Mannum Rowing Club was founded in 1910. The club is located on River Lane on the banks of the Murray in Mannum. The club hosts the annual Mannum Regatta and the Arnold Cup.

Mannum hosts a number of other sports during the year, most notably netball in the winter months (the netball club is also nicknamed the Roos), and cricket and tennis in the summer months. The local Community Complex hosts many various indoor sports, including basketball, squash, various martial arts and it contains a gym and other workout rooms.

In the summer months, particularly over the January holidays, water sports are extremely popular (mainly water skiing and wakeboarding), where both residents and tourists bring their own water craft to use on the river.

== Gallery ==
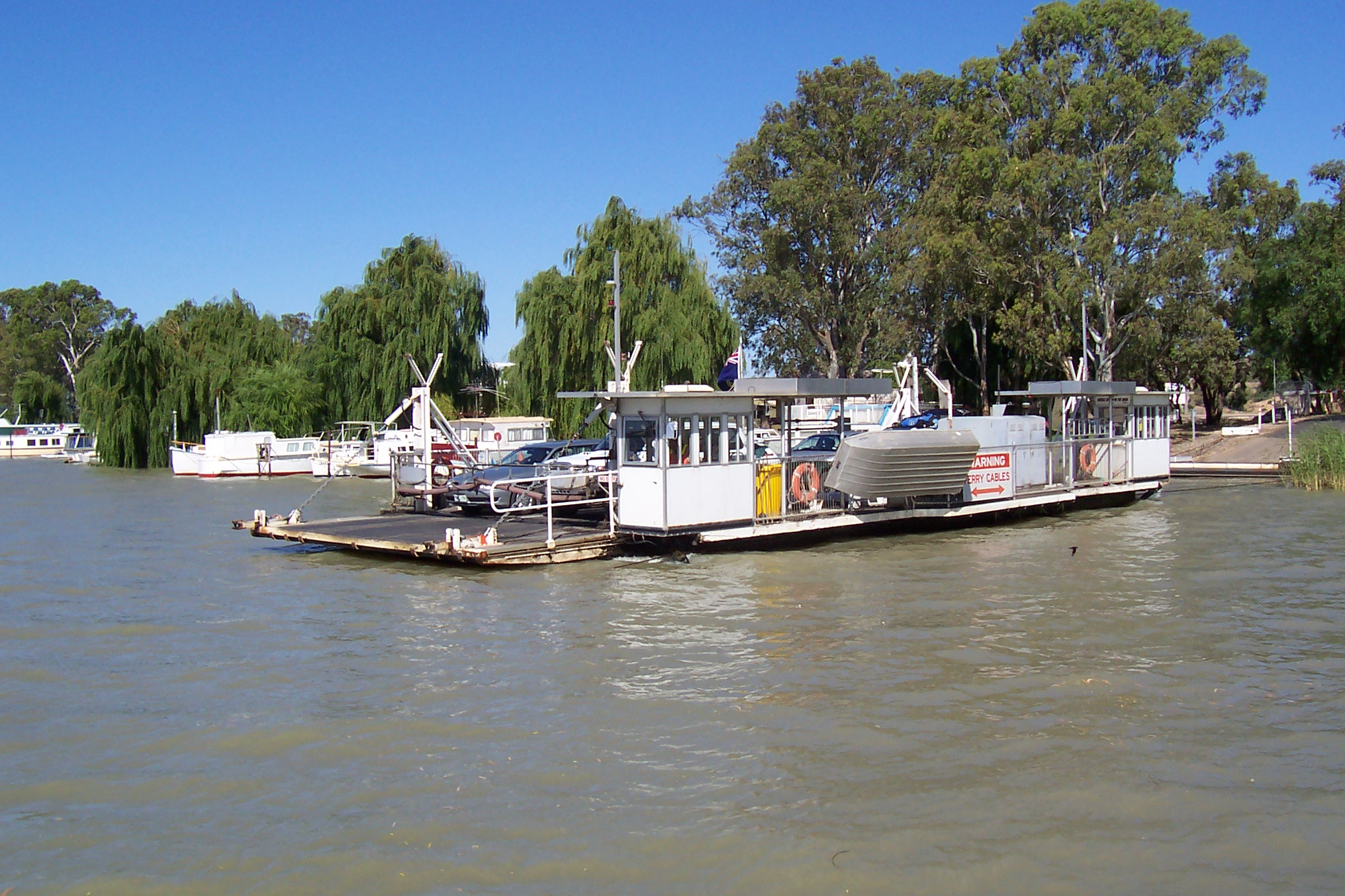
One of the two ferries at Mannum

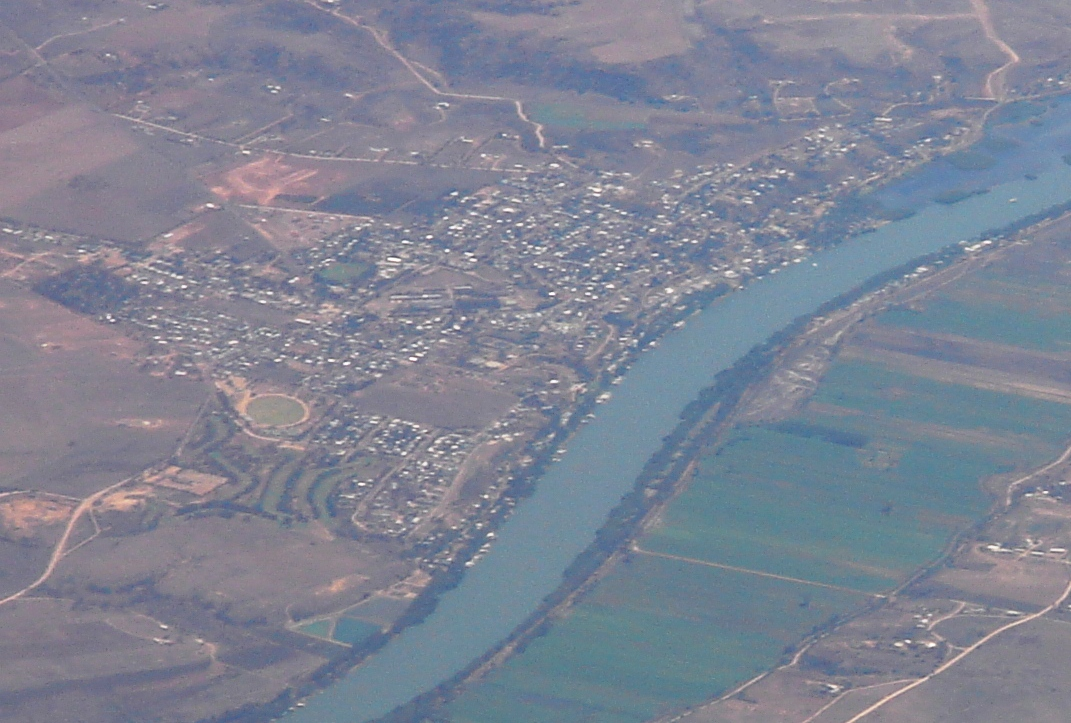
Aerial view of Mannum

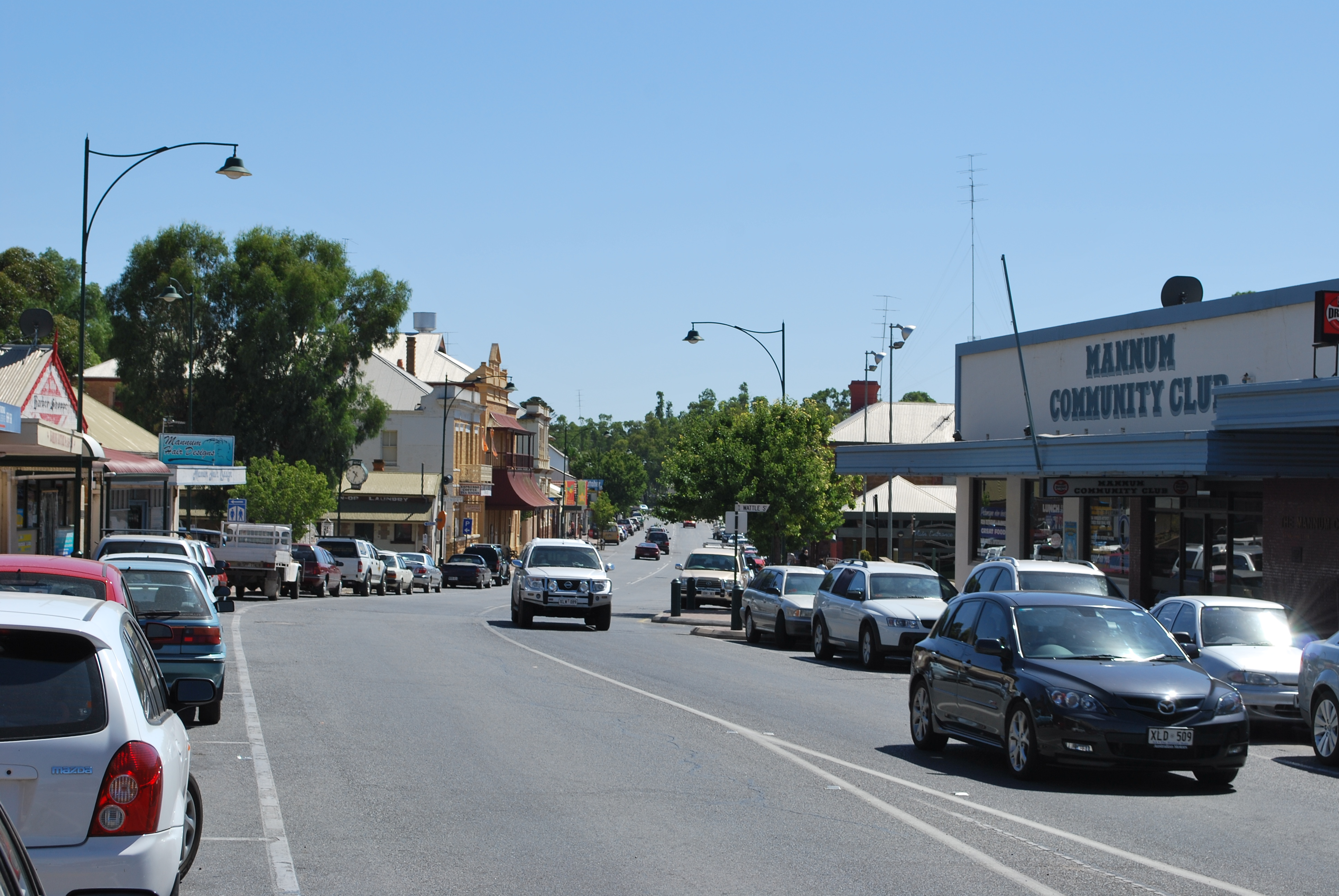
Randell St, the main street of Mannum

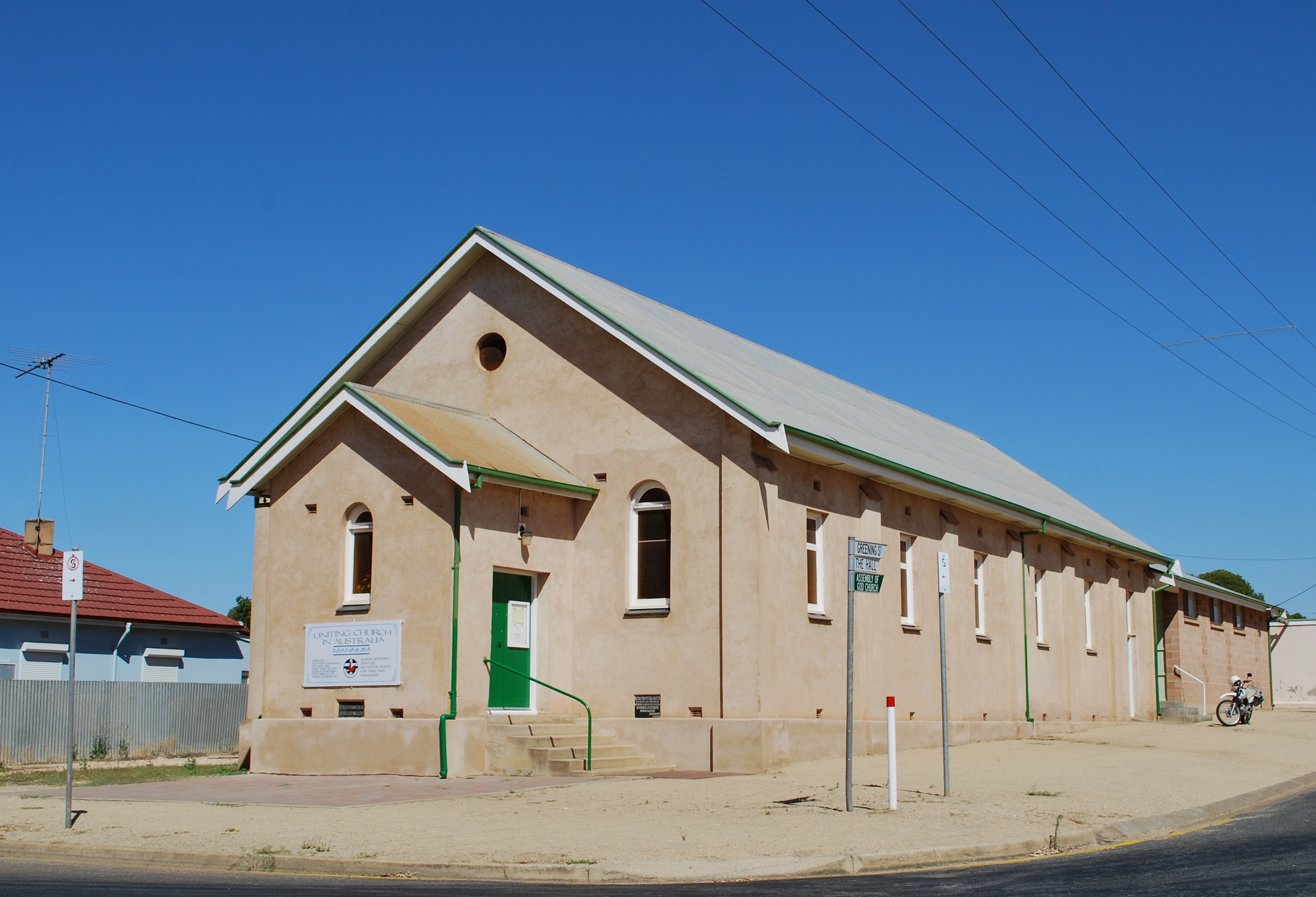
Uniting Church

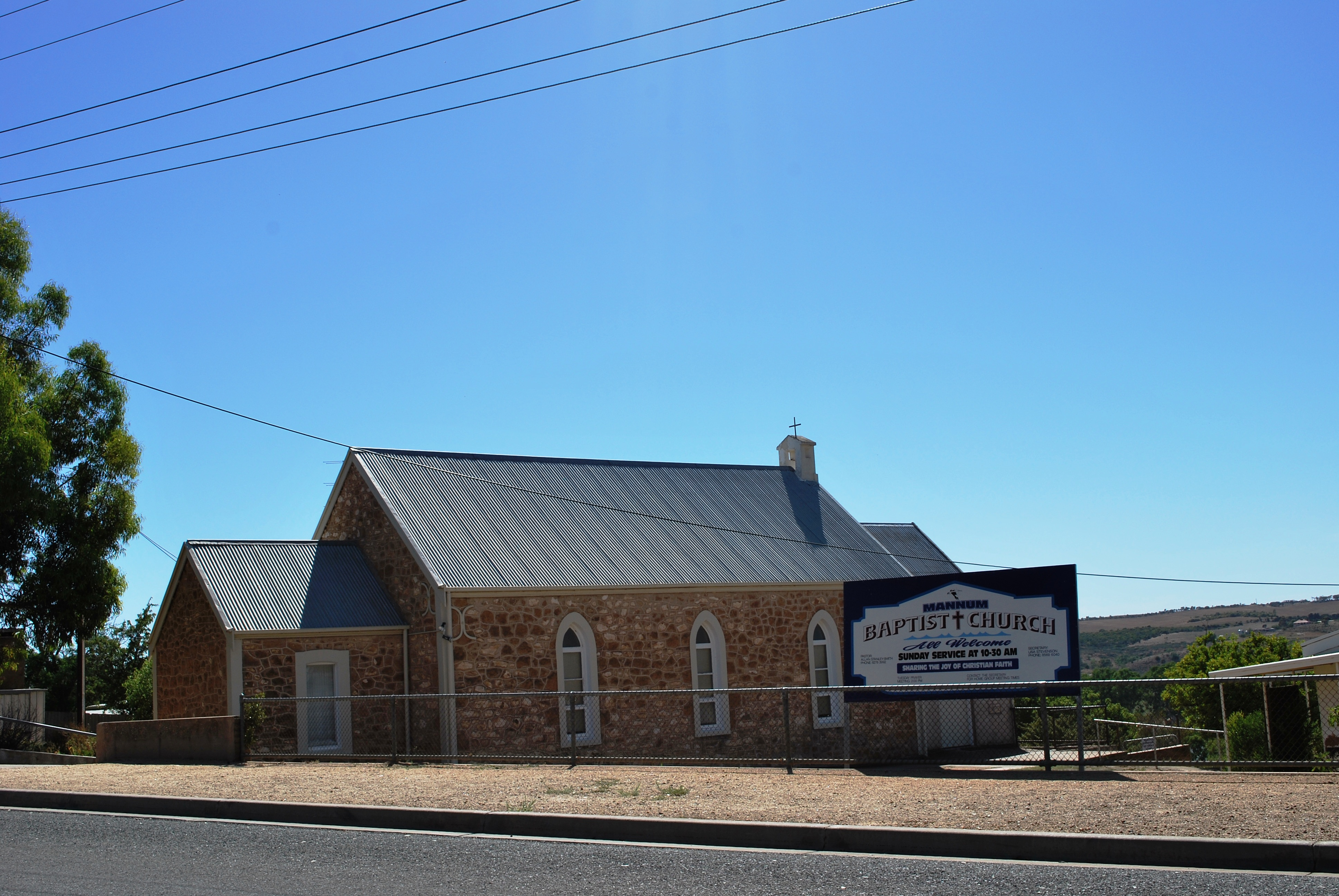
Baptist Church

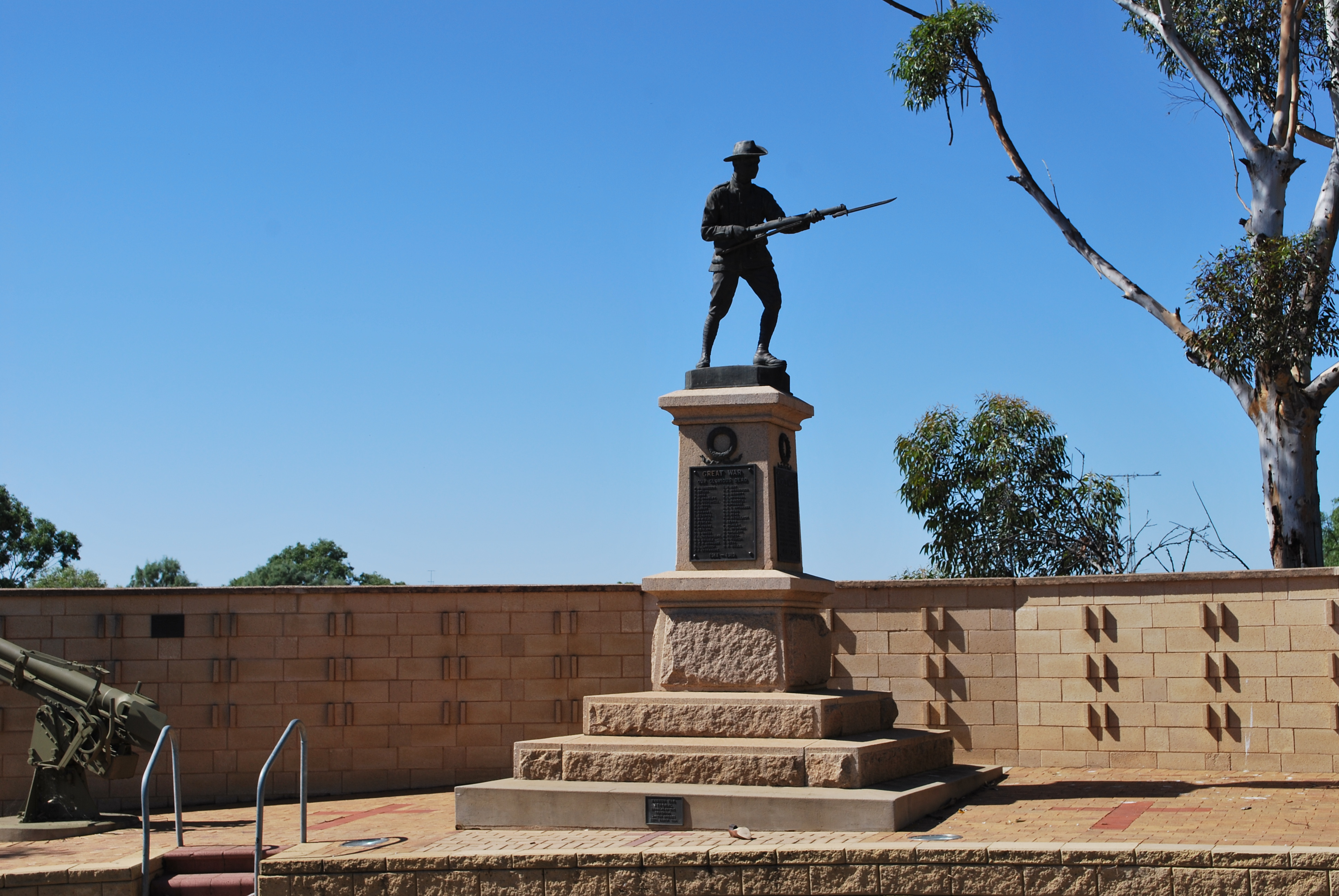
War Memorial

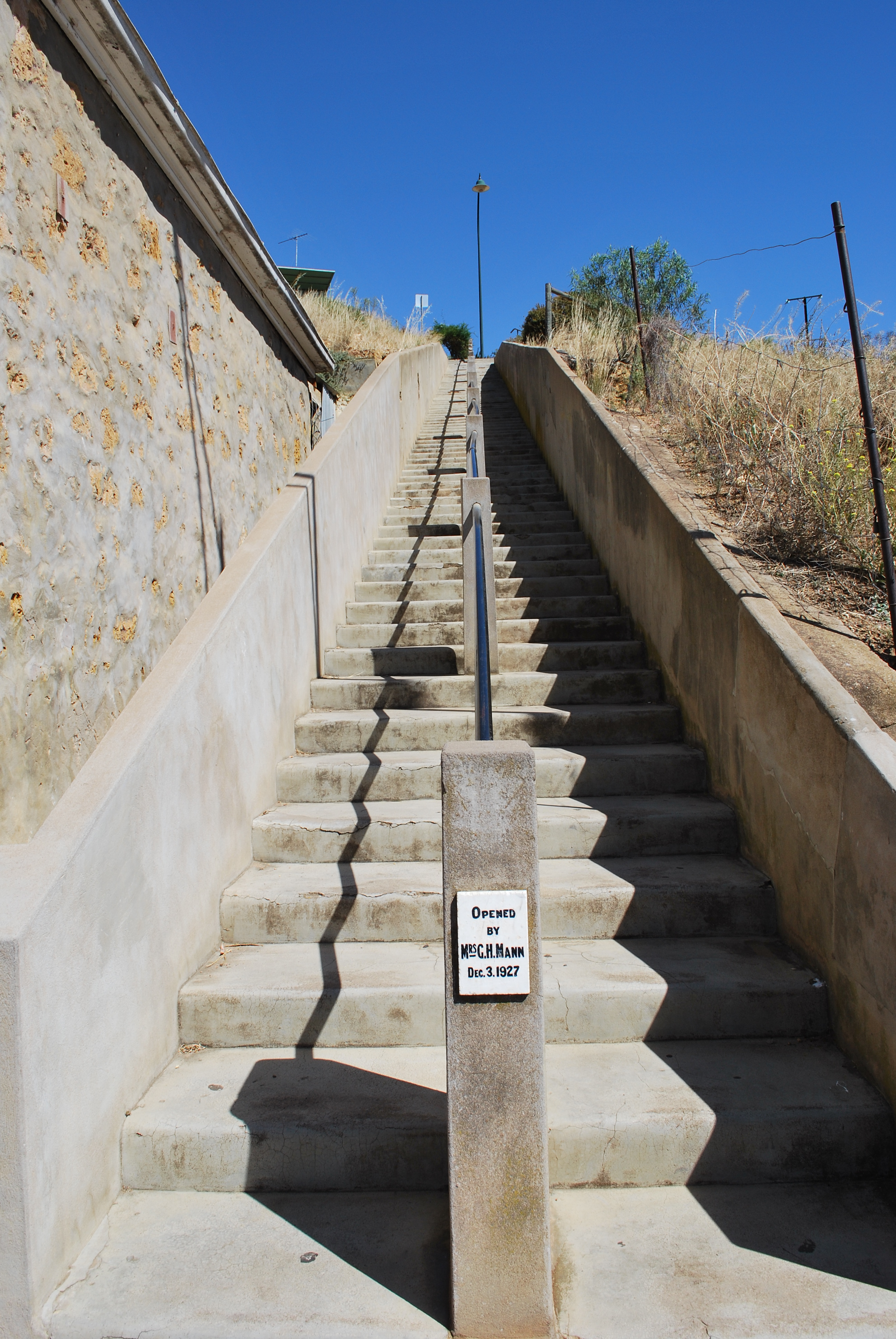
The Golden Stairs

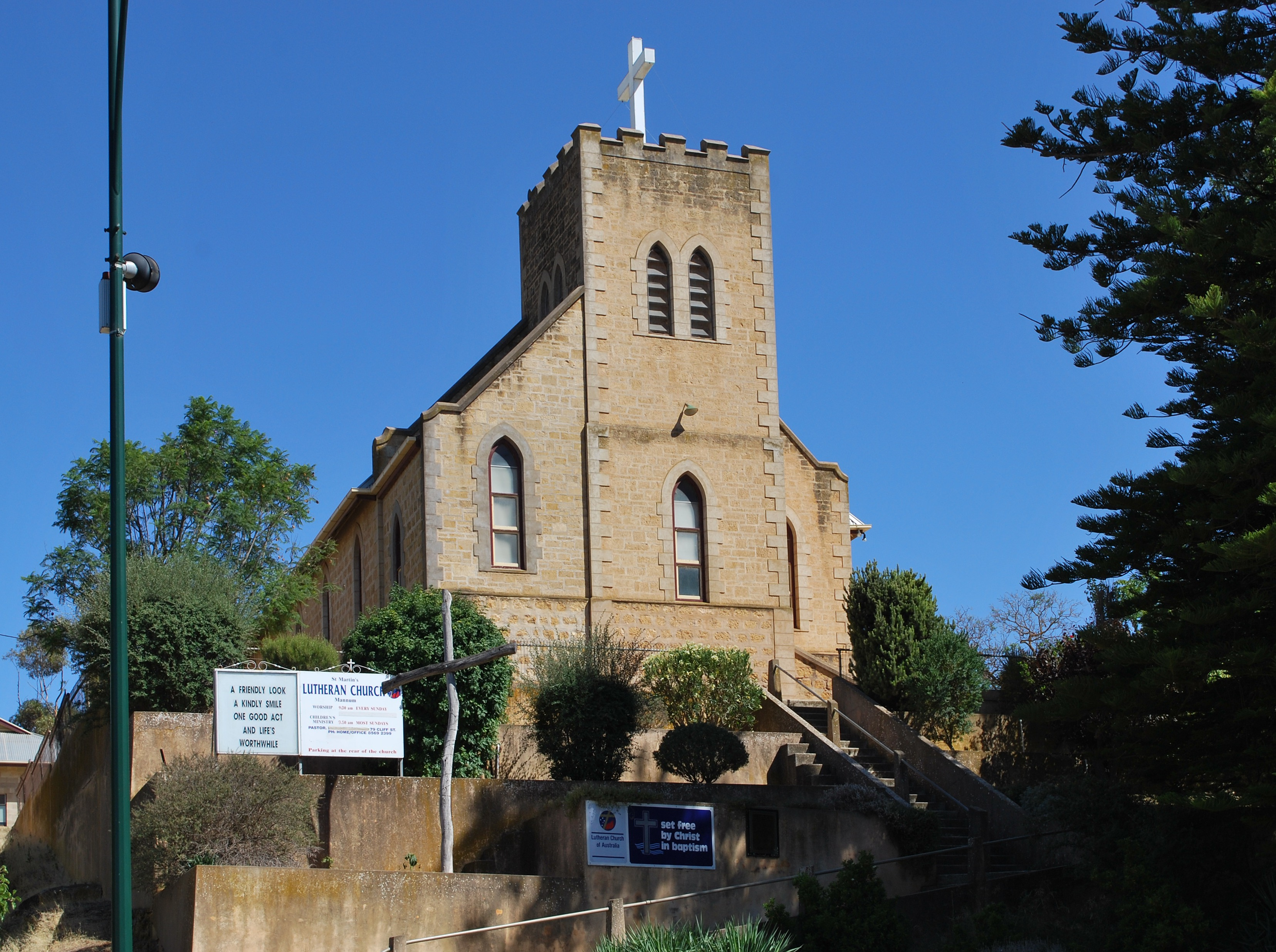
Lutheran Church

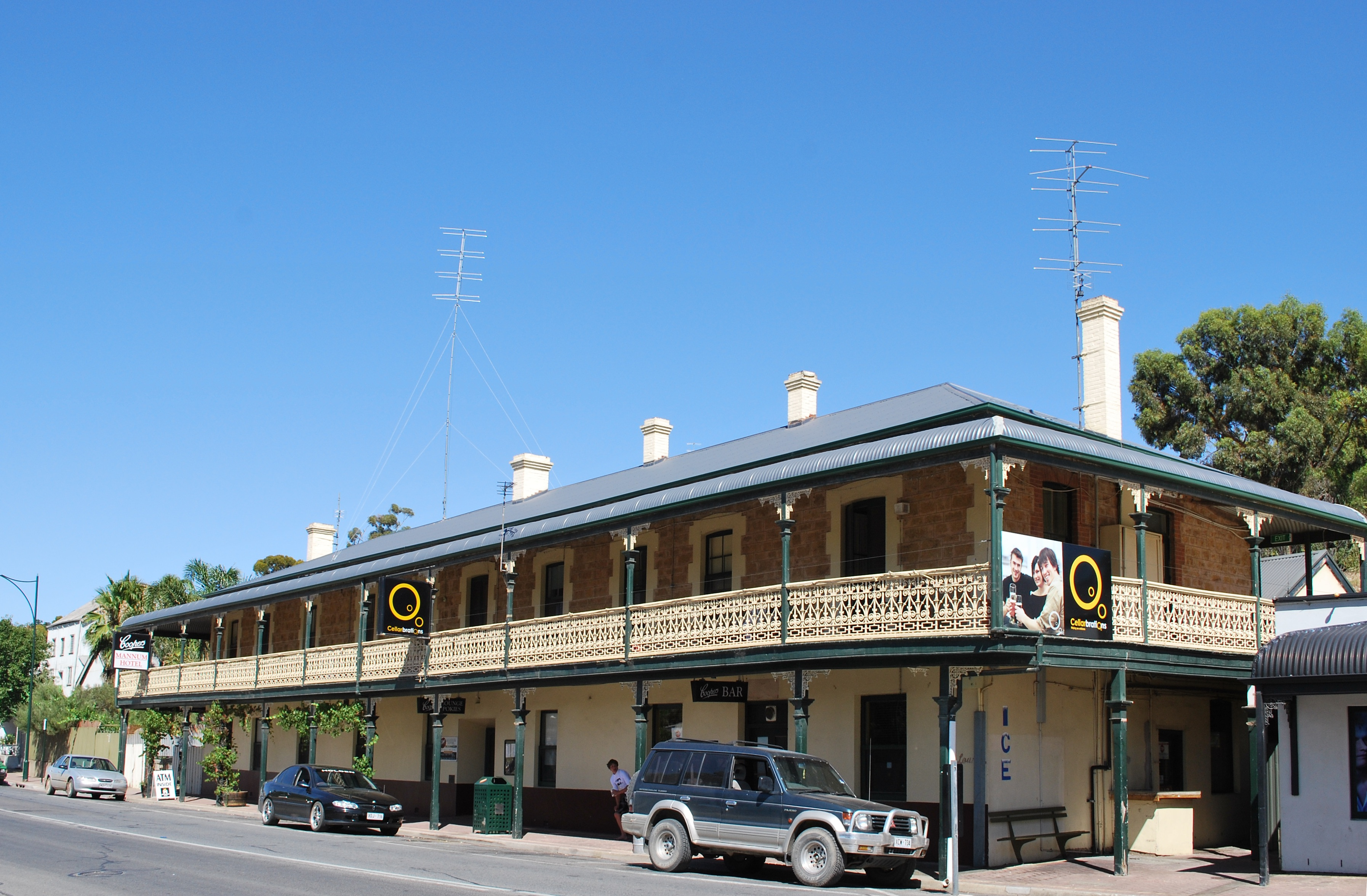
Mannum Hotel

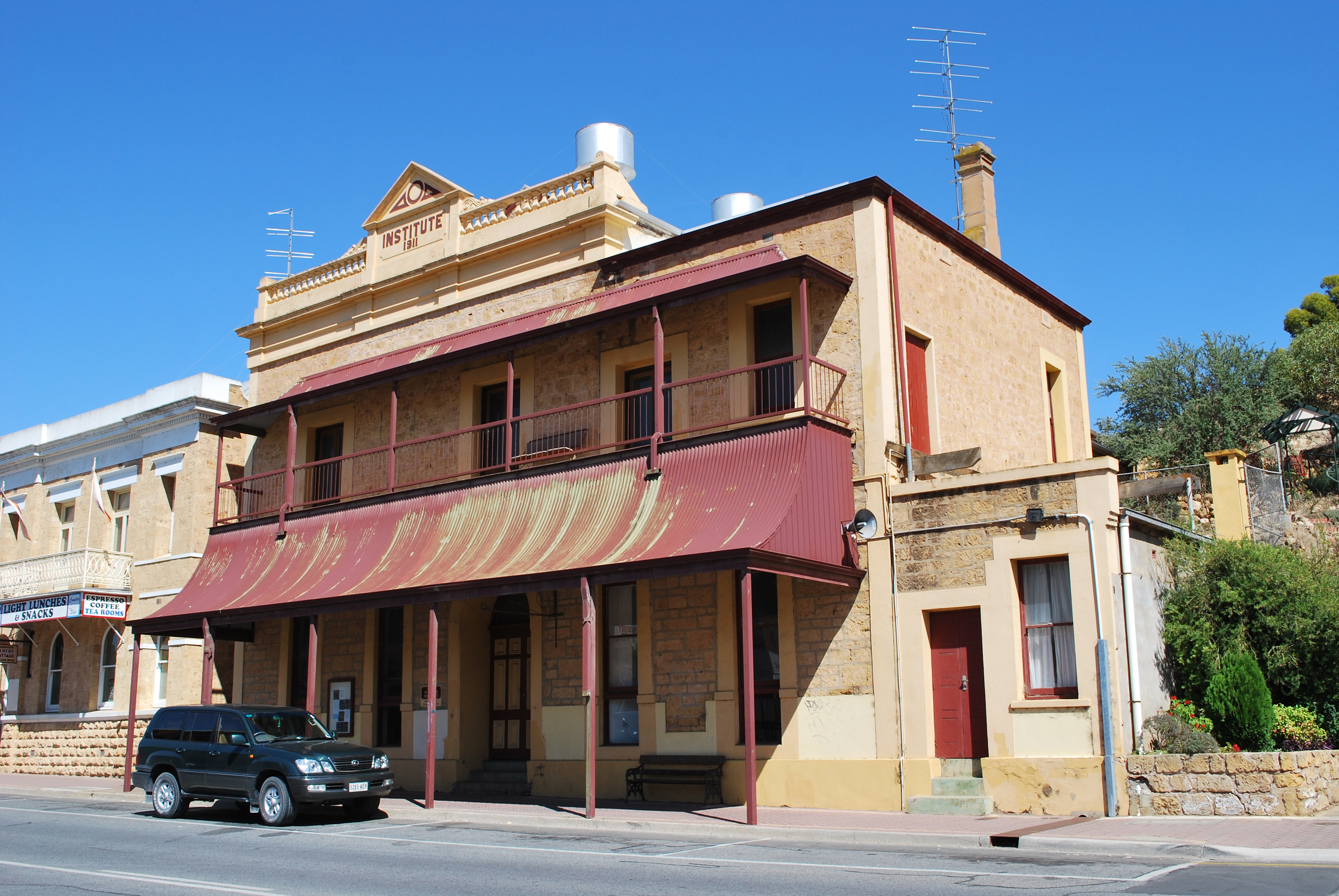
Mannum Institute

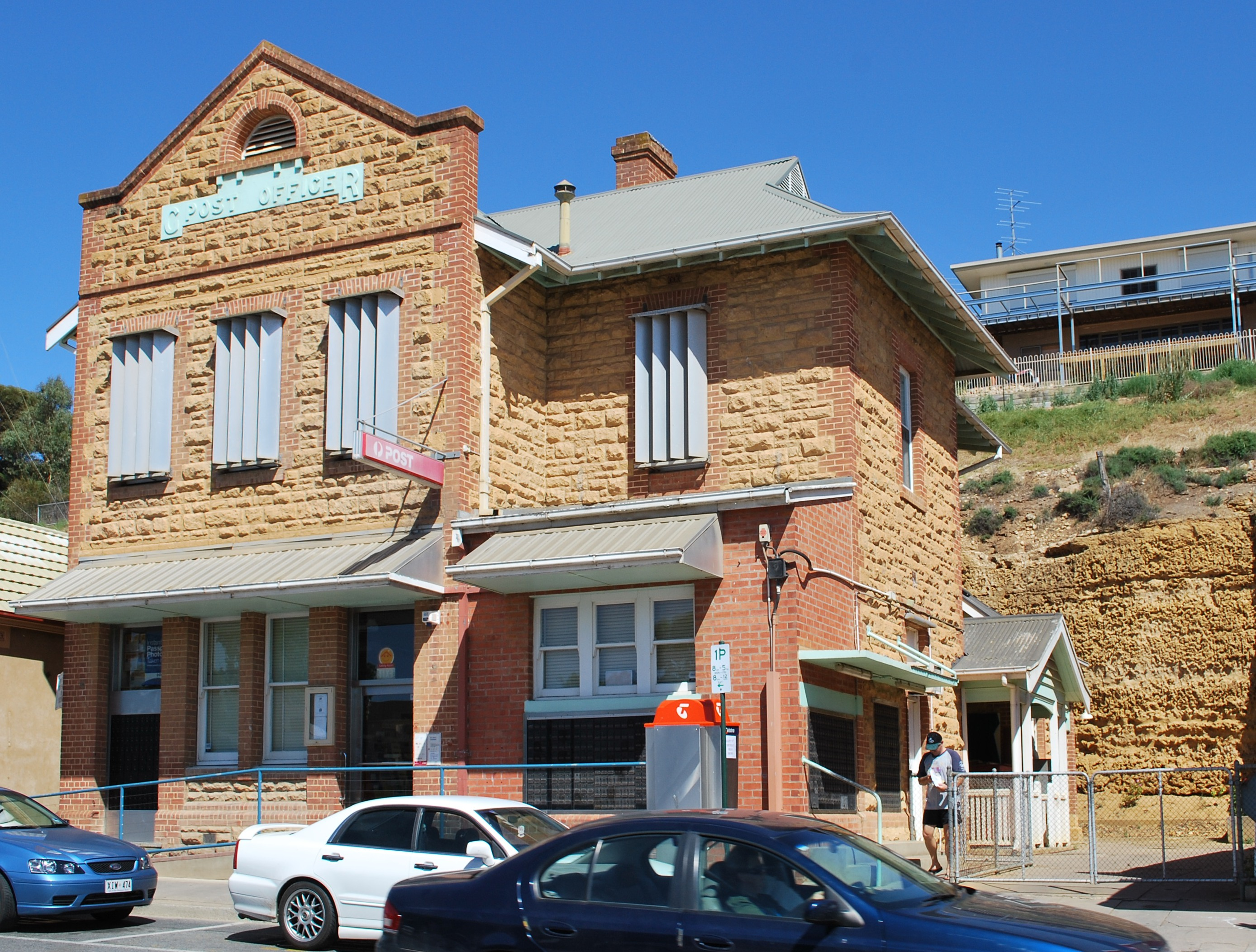
Post Office

== See also ==
- List of crossings of the Murray River
