= Palmer, South Australia =

Palmer
- Town
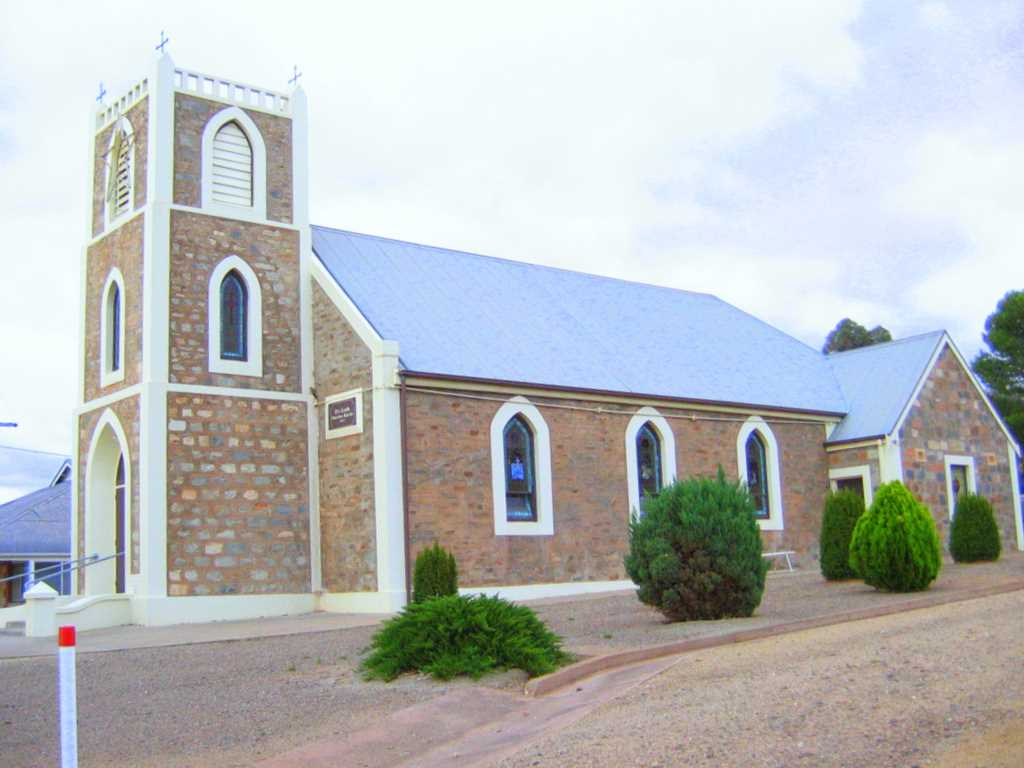
- Palmer Lutheran Church

- Coordinates: 34.852°S 139.160°E
- Country: Australia
- State: South Australia
- LGA: Mid Murray Council
- Established: 1860s

Government
  - State electorate: Schubert
  - Federal division: Barker

Population
  - Total: 215 (SAL 2021)
- Postcode: 5237
Localities around Palmer
Mount Pleasant		Milendella
Tungkillo	Palmer	Apamurra
Rockleigh	Tepko	Mannum

Palmer is a town just east of the Adelaide Hills region of South Australia along the Adelaide-Mannum Road, 70 kilometres east-north-east of the state capital, Adelaide and 15 km west-north-west of Mannum (34°51′S 139°9′E). It is located in the Mid Murray Council local government area.

Palmer has a primary school (opened 1882), a general store, hotel and a Lutheran Church of which Carl Heinrich Loessel was the first pastor, from 22 May 1869 before the church was built, succeeded by the long-serving Pastor Kuss.

There are some rock formations at the Granite Boulders Area Geological Site.

== History ==
Palmer is sited within the confines of the Peramangk First Nations people. The first European explorers through the Palmer district were Dr George Imlay and John Hill in January 1838.

The Reedy Creek special survey was granted on 14 September 1846 to Enthoven, Capper and Masterman with Samuel Davenport as agent. The township of Palmer was laid out in August 1873 on section 960. The town was named after Colonel George Palmer, a South Australian Colonisation Commissioner. It was settled as a mining and agricultural settlement. The Kitticoola mine was discovered as a copper and gold deposit in 1845. The remaining surface elements of the underground mine are heritage-listed. Hillgrove Resources acquired rights for further mineral exploration in 2014.

The Palmer Sculpture Biennale has been staged in the surrounding landscape of Palmer since 2004.

== Heritage listings ==
Palmer has a number of heritage-listed sites, including:

- Adelaide-Mannum Road: Granite Boulders Area Geological Site
- Mannum Road: Palmer Police Station and Cells
- off Mine Road: Kitticoola Mine
- Palmer Road: Homestead Complex
- off Western Boundary Road: Reedy Creek Railway Bridge
