= Mount Pleasant, South Australia =

Mount Pleasant
- Town
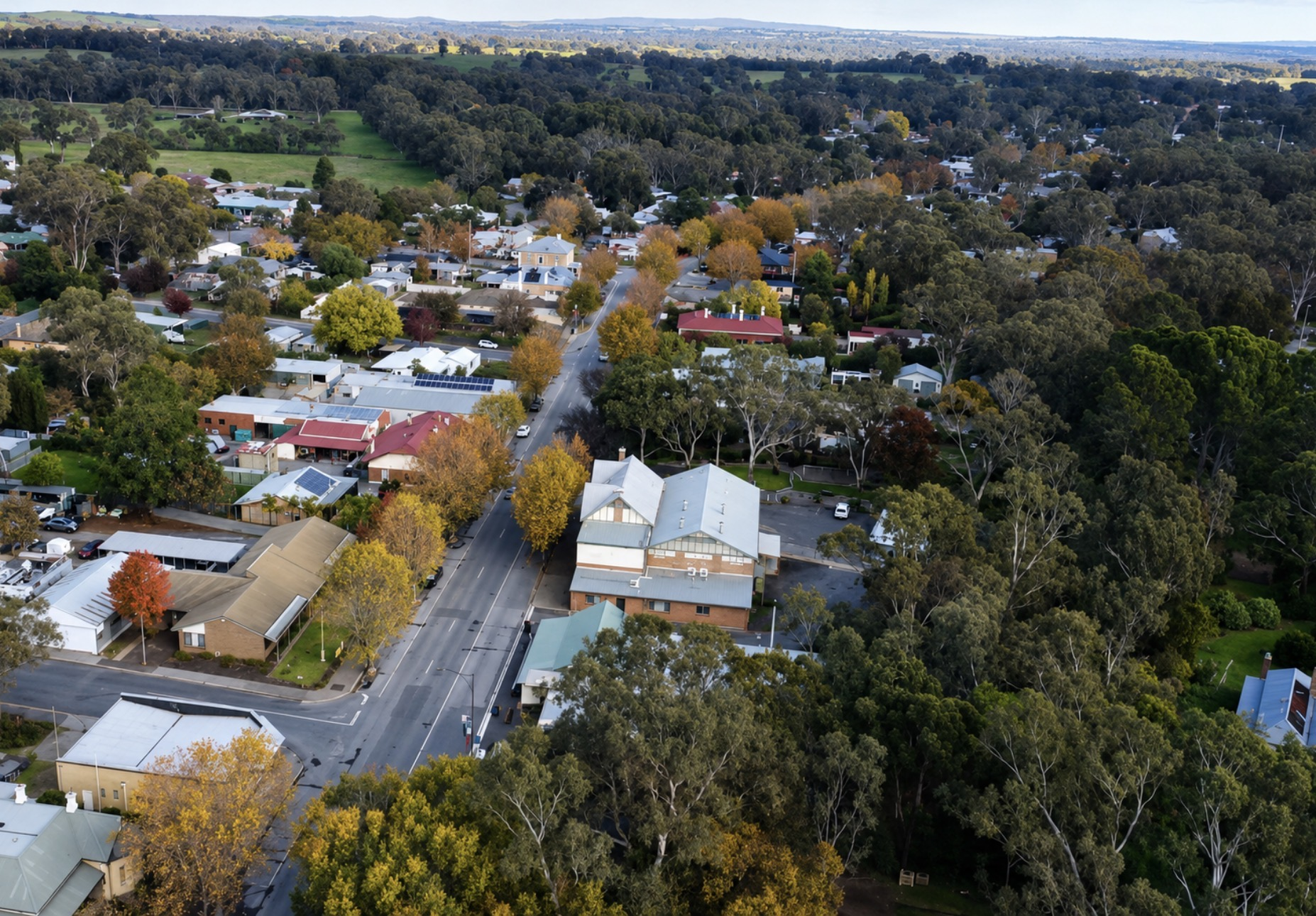
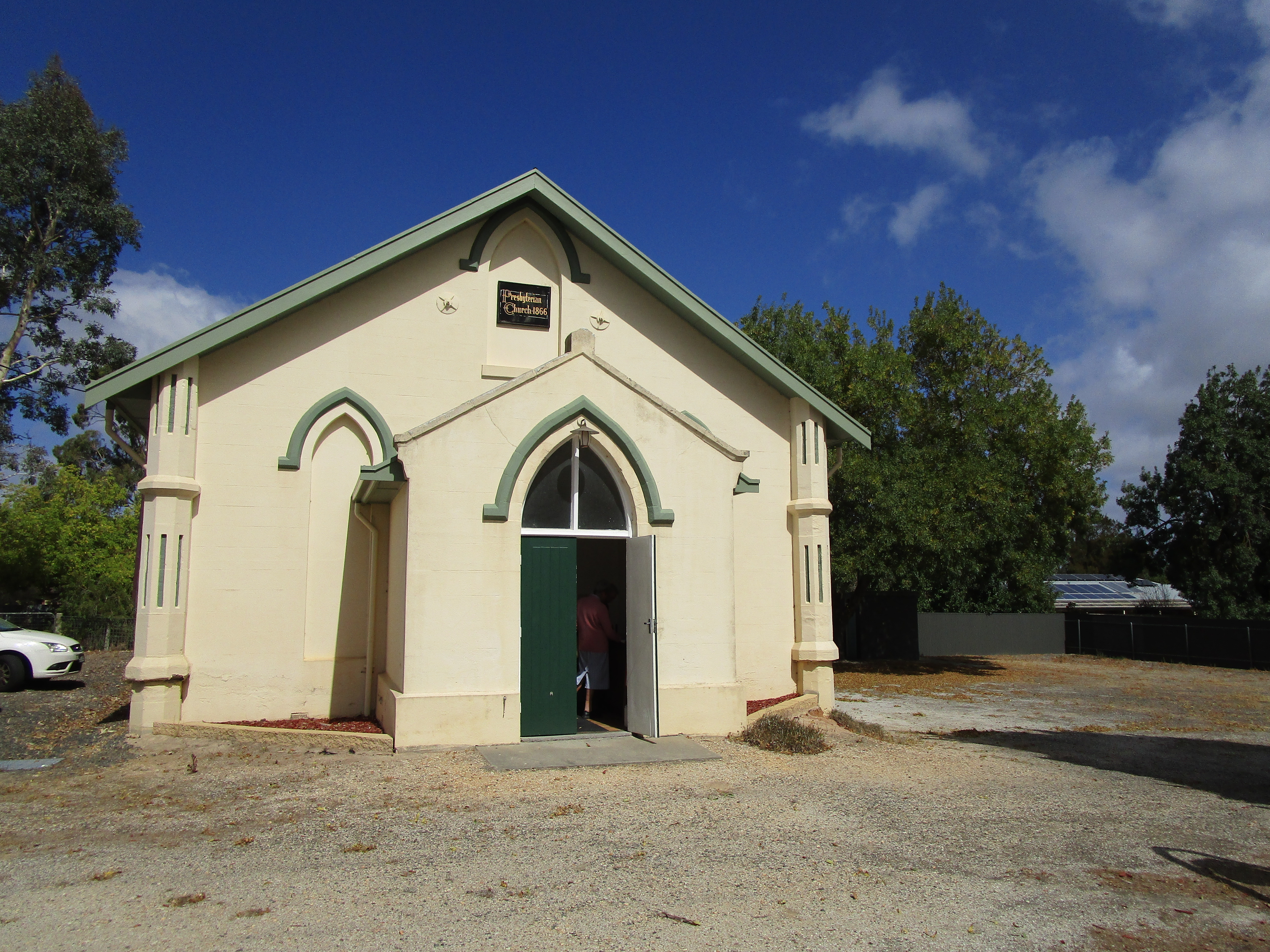
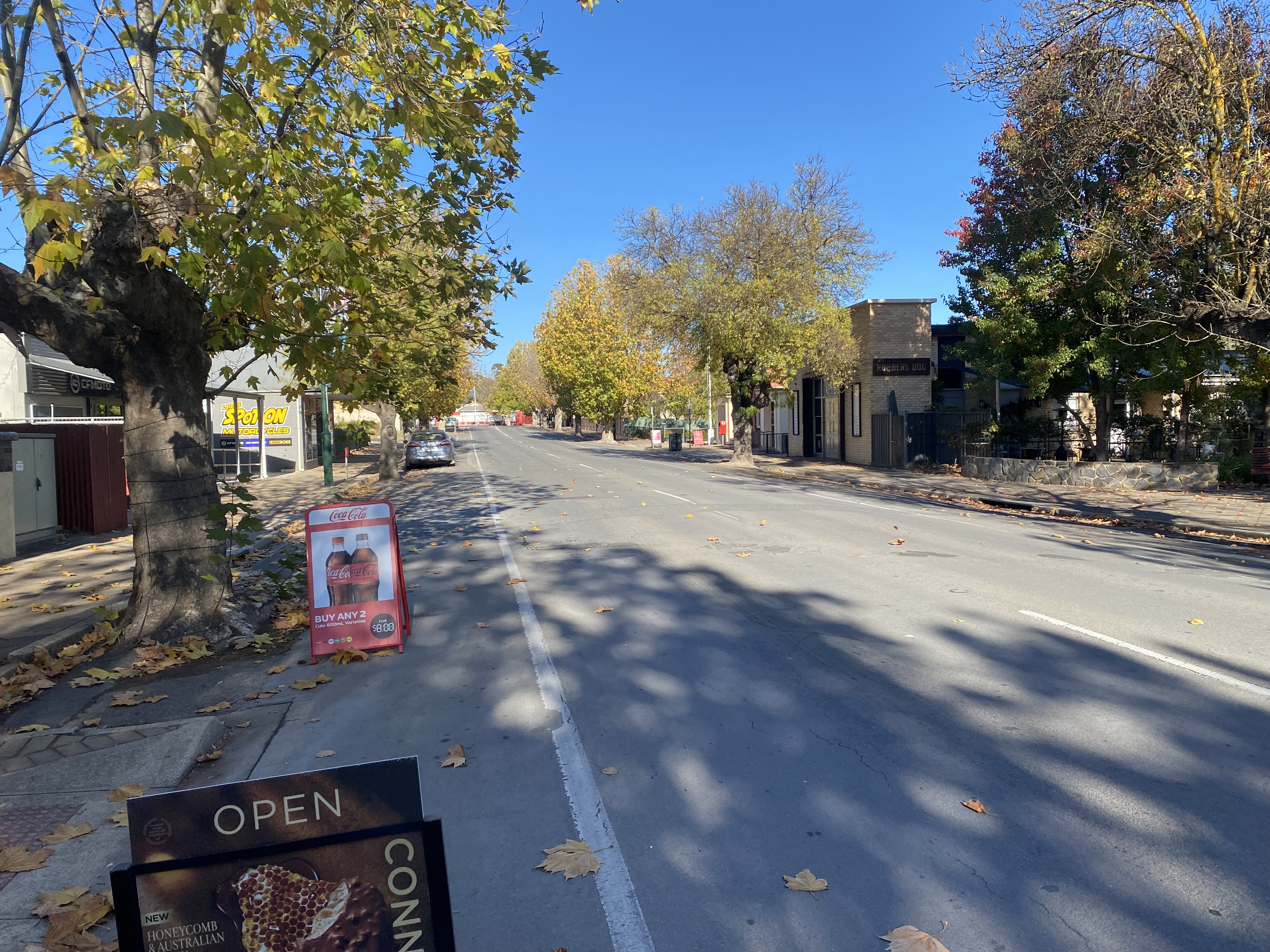
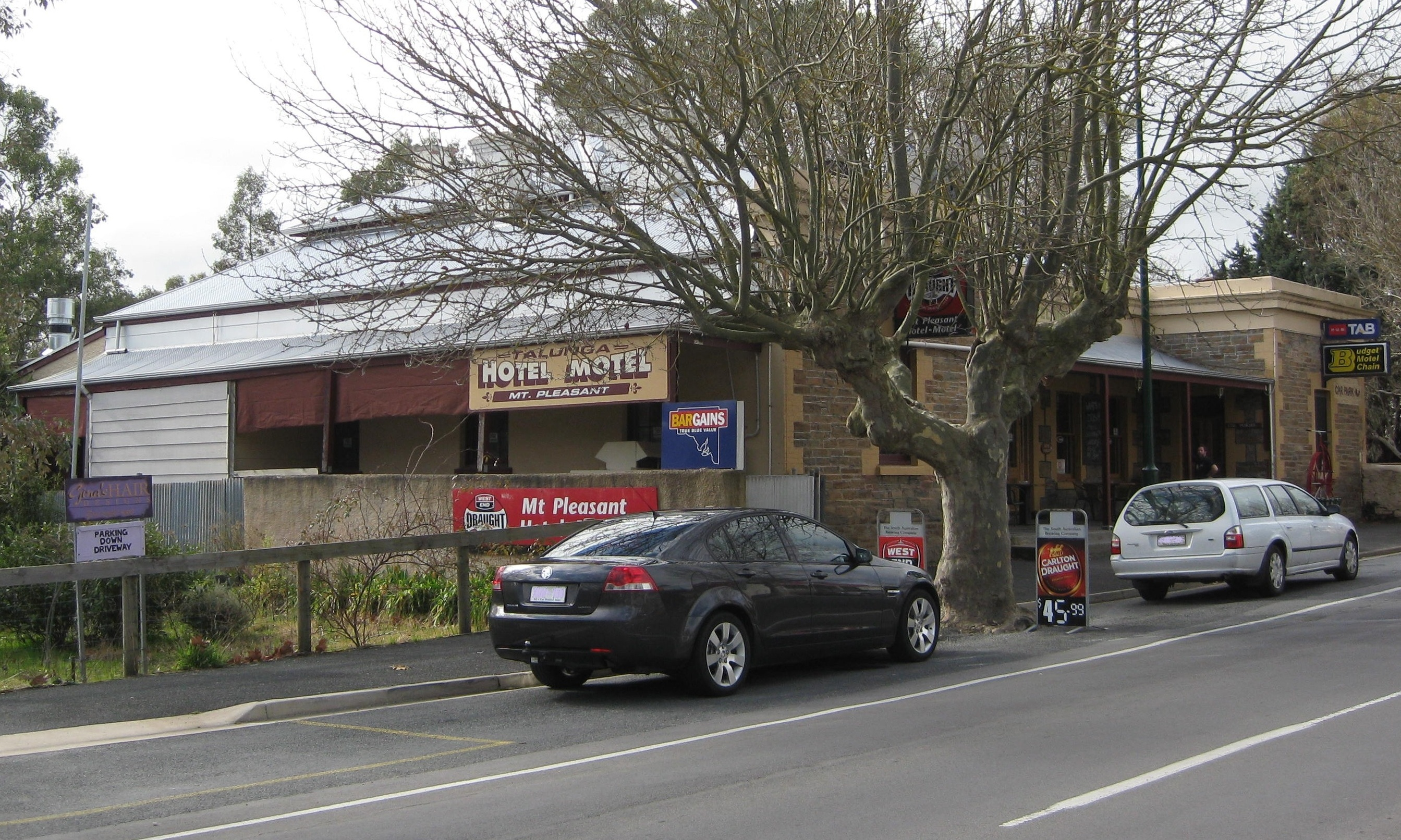
- Mount Pleasant from above Uniting Church

- Interactive map of Mount Pleasant
- Coordinates: 34.773°S 139.051°E
- Country: Australia
- State: South Australia
- LGAs: Barossa Council; Mid Murray Council
- Location: 55 km (34 mi) East of Adelaide via
- Established: 1843

Government
  - State electorate: Schubert
  - Federal division: Barker

Population
  - Total: 618 (UCL 2021)
- Postcode: 5235
Localities around Mount Pleasant
Gumeracha	Springton	Sanderston
Cromer	Mount Pleasant	Milendella
Birdwood	Charleston	Tungkillo; Palmer

Mount Pleasant is a town situated in the Barossa Council, just north of the Adelaide Hills region of South Australia, 55 kilometres east-north-east of the state capital, Adelaide (34°46′S 139°3′E). It is located in the Barossa Council and Mid Murray Council local government areas, and is at an altitude of 440 metres above sea level. Rainfall in the area averages 687 mm per annum.

== History ==
=== Origin of the name ===
Today's Mount Pleasant comprises three townships, Totness, Talunga and Hendryton. Mount Pleasant township was developed by Henry Glover, and surveyed in 1856. It comprised the land from Railway Terrace to Saleyard Road. The name was taken from that used by James Phillis, who had come from an area near Eastry in Kent. The land had reminded him of his homeland. His sister was named Pleasant, who may also have inspired the name.

Totness was surveyed in 1858, with Henry Giles Sr. as the developer; this was the section from Saleyard Road to Pentelows Road. It was named after the birthplace of Henry's wife, Mary Ann. Henry also developed North Totness, which is the land from Pentelows Road to the Walkers Flat Road, surveyed in 1869. John Hendry, a blacksmith living in Totness, developed the land to the west of Mount Pleasant, comprising that from the Cricks Mill Road (to Williamstown) to Railway Terrace, and this was surveyed in 1865.

=== European settlement ===
The first European explorers through the Mount Pleasant district were Dr George Imlay and John Hill in January 1838. Settlers moved into the area in the late 1830s with flocks of sheep and with bags of grain. One of the early settlers, James Phillis, had arrived in Adelaide in 1839 and literally rode a horse into the Adelaide Hills looking for suitable land to farm. He settled at Mount Pleasant in 1843, planted wheat, harvested the crop, and then had to take it to Adelaide to sell. From the profits he sailed to England where he bought a flock of Romney Marsh sheep which he shipped back to the area. Over the years he became one of the district's most prosperous and successful farmers. This is an extract from an article written by Nancy Mavis Pike (née Phillis). Several of Mt Pleasant's pioneer families were to lose sons in the Great War, like William Polden who is now buried in The Lone Pine Cemetery, Gallipoli.

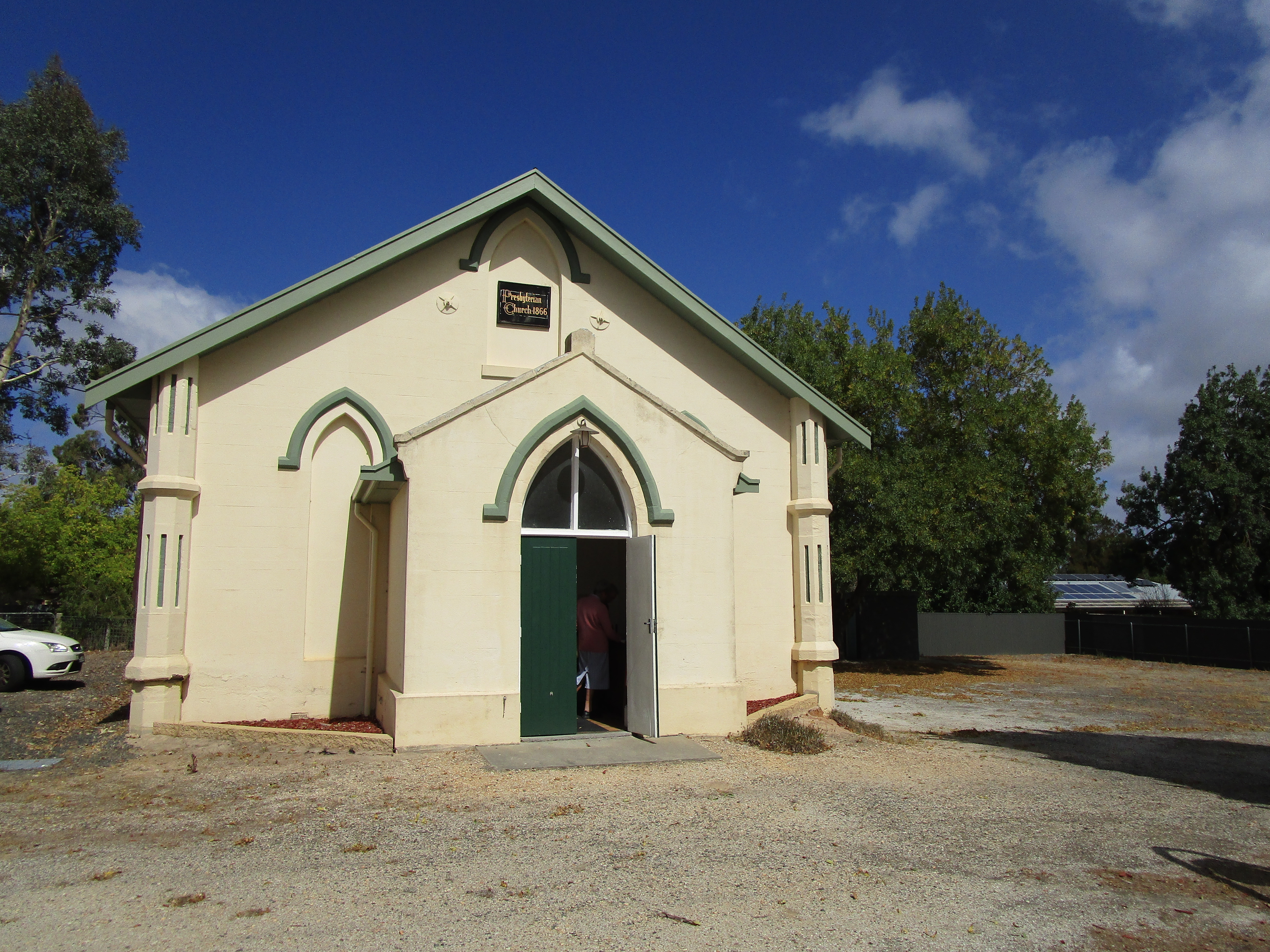
The Mount Pleasant Presbyterian church on Saleyard Road was built in 1866 and is now the Unting Church in the town

A small quantity of gold was found in the district in the 1860s, but not enough to attract significant mining activity. The town remained a small service centre for the region. The original police station, from the 1860s, has been largely replaced by a newer building. The main street, Melrose Street, is lined with plane trees.

Mount Pleasant was the centre of its own municipality, the District Council of Mount Pleasant, from 1935 until 1997 when it was divided between the larger Barossa Council and Mid Murray Council. Mount Pleasant township is now part of the Barossa Council.

=== Heritage listings ===
Mount Pleasant has a number of significant heritage-listed sites, including:

- 'Kent Farm' – 3184 Eden Valley Road: Historic Cottage and Barn (Circa 1840s).
- 27 Melrose Street: Mount Pleasant Police Station and Cells
- Walker Flat-Mount Pleasant Road: Rosebank Shearing Shed

== Geography ==
Mount Pleasant is located 10 km north-east of Birdwood heading towards Springton, Eden Valley and Angaston.

At the ABS 2001 census, Mount Pleasant had a population of 529 people living in 240 dwellings.

== Facilities ==
Mount Pleasant has a primary school, kindergarten, a district hospital, post office, CFS (country fire service) station, butcher, golf club, bowling club, tennis club, pharmacy, two bakeries, two pubs, two hairdressers, Wilksch's garage, crash repair, showgrounds featuring the annual Mount Pleasant show, a weekly Saturday Farmer's market, caravan park, RSL and a football club.

== Transport ==
A coach is operated from Tea Tree Plaza Interchange to Gumeracha and Mount Pleasant by Affordable Coachlines. A private coach service also goes from Birdwood to the Barossa Valley via Mount Pleasant.

Mount Pleasant was once the terminus of the South Australian Railways' Mount Pleasant railway line which branched from the Adelaide to Murray Bridge line at Balhannah. The line opened on 16 September 1918 and was closed on 4 March 1963, following improved road conditions via the Adelaide-Mannum Road. It was taken up shortly after. The former rail corridor can still be seen from a few roads, and is gradually being converted, from Balhannah towards Mount Pleasant, into a cycling, walking and horseback riding trail known as the Amy Gillett Bikeway. As of 2015, this conversion had reached Mount Torrens.

== See also ==
- Wiljani Conservation Park
