= Rail transport in South Australia =

Railways of South Australia
Overview
- Locale: South Australia, Australia
- Dates of operation: 1854–present

Technical
- Track gauge: 1600 mm (5 ft 3 in) broad gauge, 1435 mm (4 ft 8 1/2 in) standard gauge, 1067 mm (3 ft 6 in) narrow gauge

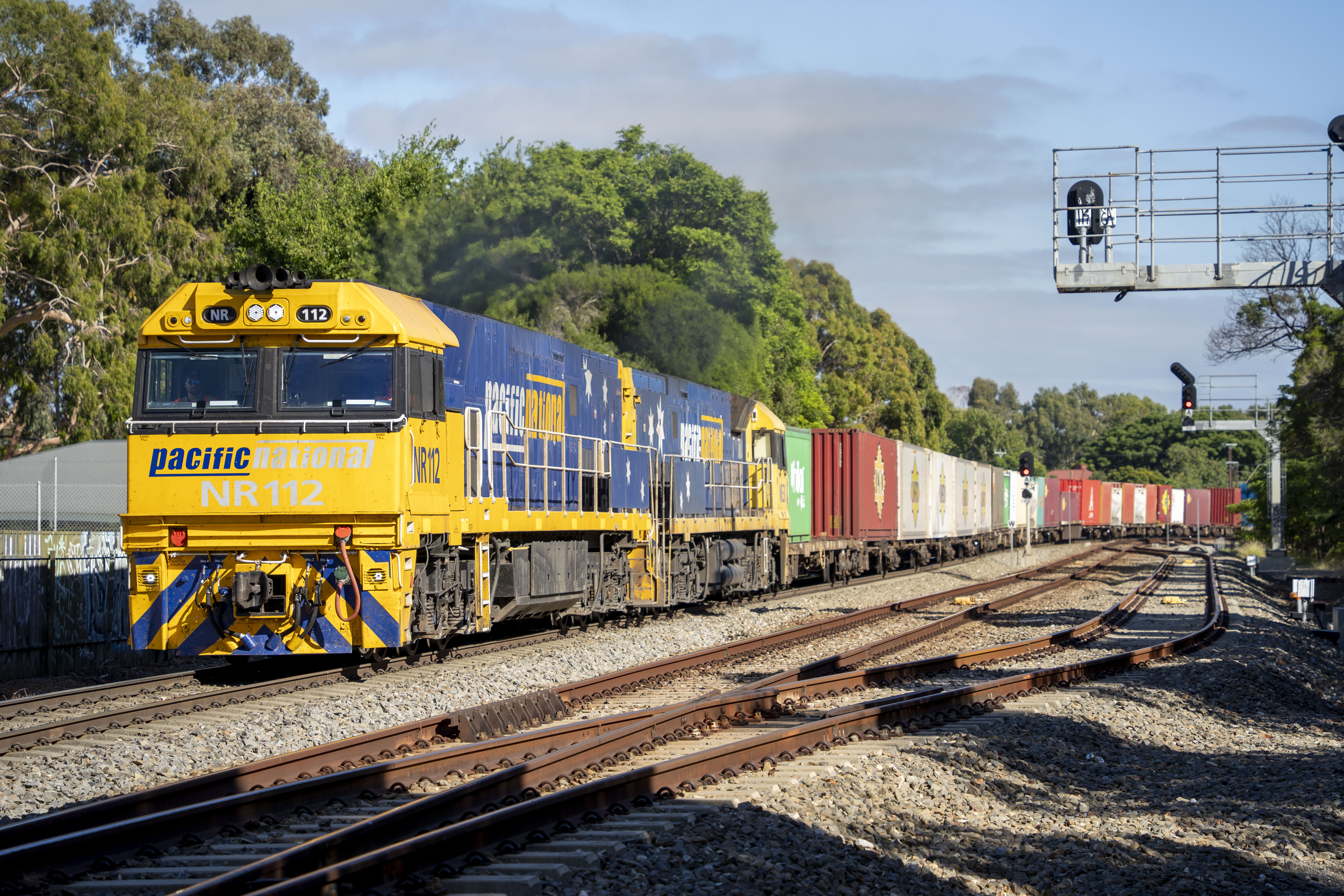
Pacific National freight train passing Millswood parallel to the Belair Line in February 2024

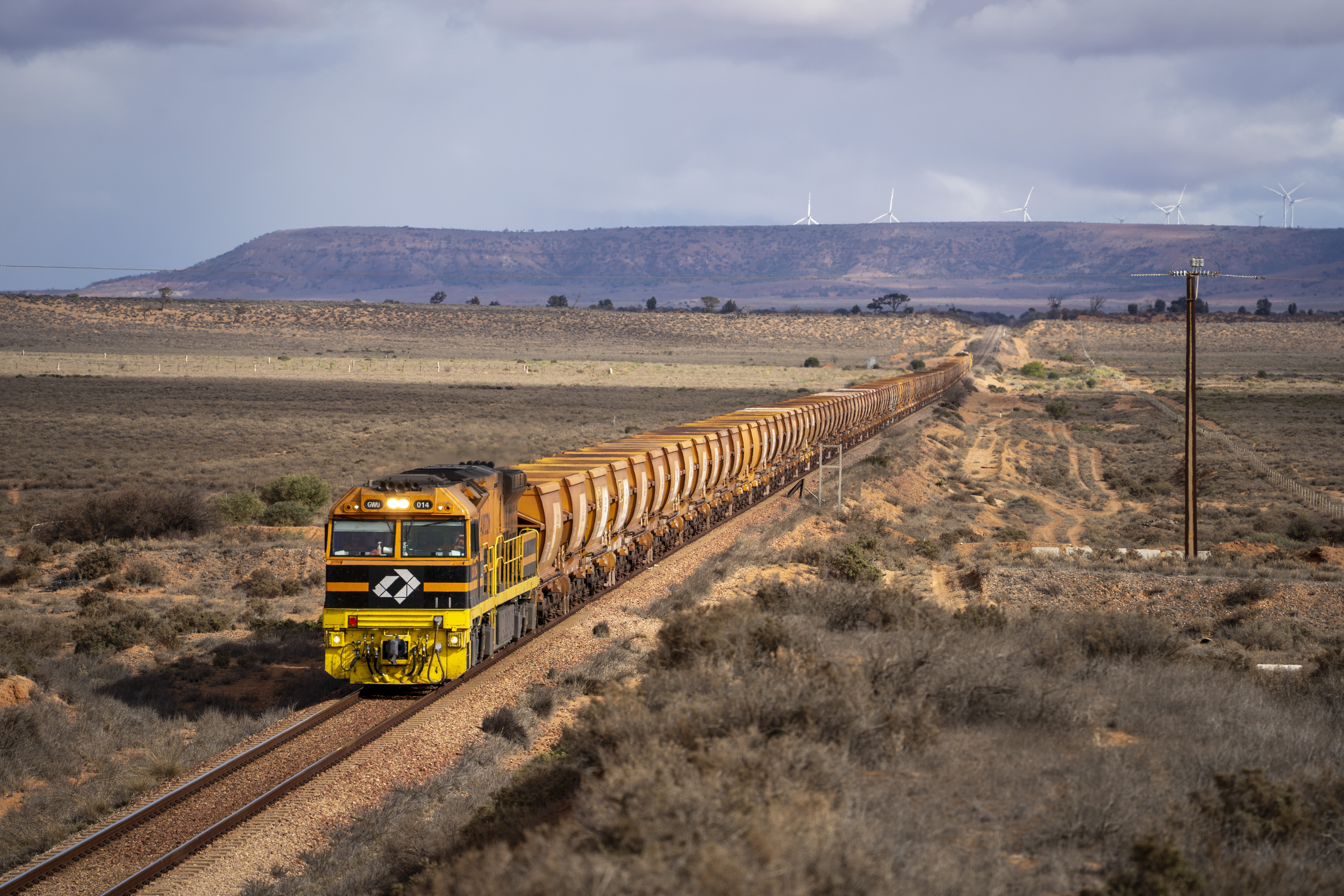
Aurizon iron ore train approaching Port Augusta in Outback South Australia, July 2025

Rail transport in the Australian state of South Australia is provided by a number of railway operators who operate over the government-owned railway lines. The network consists of 1435 mm (4 ft 8 1/2 in) standard gauge links to other states, the 1600 mm (5 ft 3 in) broad gauge suburban railways in Adelaide, a freight-only branch from Dry Creek to Port Adelaide and Pelican Point, a narrow-gauge gypsum haulage line on the Eyre Peninsula, and both copper–gold concentrate and coal on the standard-gauge line in the Adelaide–Darwin rail corridor north of Tarcoola.

The Australian Rail Track Corporation (ARTC), an agency of the federal government, owns standard gauge interstate lines and the freight-only branch from Dry Creek to Port Adelaide and Pelican Point. The ARTC lines bypass the city to the west and do not enter the CBD. The ARTC network extends from Adelaide towards Melbourne, Sydney, Perth and Darwin and is used by substantial interstate freight traffic. Journey Beyond is a private company operating long-distance interstate passenger trains from the Adelaide Parklands Terminal, just west of the CBD, on the ARTC's standard gauge lines.

Unlike most other states, South Australia no longer runs regional freight and passenger services. The last broad-gauge freight service was the limestone train from Penrice, which operated from 1950 until it abruptly ceased in June 2014.

== History ==
The first railway in colonial South Australia was the horse-drawn tramway from Goolwa to Port Elliot opened in 1854, providing a rail link from the port of Goolwa on the Murray River to an ocean harbour at Port Elliot. It was later extended to a safer harbour at Victor Harbor. This line was used to move freight between the shallow-draft vessels navigating the Murray, and coastal and ocean-going vessels, without either having to traverse the narrow and shallow mouth of the river with unpredictable currents.

The first of the railways in Adelaide was built in 1856 between the city and the port. The Adelaide railways were all built as broad gauge of 1600 mm (5 ft 3 in). Gradually, a network of lines spread out from Adelaide. These were initially built to carry ore, particularly copper, then later freight from the River Murray, and grain from the broadacre lands. In the first half of the 20th century, most of these lines carried passengers as well as freight, sometimes in mixed trains.

The main line to Melbourne was opened after a bridge was built at Murray Bridge in 1886. It was the first railway line between colony capitals to not have a break-of-gauge. It was also the last of these to be converted to standard gauge in 1995.

The rail network reached a peak by the 1940s and 50s but steadily declined, as branch and cross country lines were closed until the 2010s.

== Gauge ==
In January 1846, William Ewart Gladstone, the British Colonial Secretary, recommended to the Governor of New South Wales that railways in the Australian colonies be. constructed to the newly termed "standard gauge" (originally "Stephenson gauge") of 1435 mm (4 ft 8 1/2 in). In 1847, the Parliament of South Australia passed an act confirming adoption of the standard gauge, being the first Australian colony to do so. In 1848, the Colonial Secretary, Earl Grey, recommended all the Australian colonies adopt that gauge. However, engineer of the company building the first railway in New South Wales decided to adopt the "Irish" broad gauge of 1600 mm (5 ft 3 in). In February 1851, Earl Grey approved the change and Victoria and South Australia ordered locomotives and rolling stock to the wider gauge.

In the meantime, a new engineer of the Sydney Railway Co., James Wallace, persuaded the NSW governor to authorise building the railway in the standard gauge. By then, it was too late for Victoria and South Australia to change their orders for rolling stock. So began Australia's "mixed gauge muddle" which persists to this day.

The first main line railway in Adelaide was built in 1856 between the city and the port. The main line to Melbourne was opened after a bridge was built at Murray Bridge in 1886. It was the first railway line between Australian capital cities not to have a break-of-gauge – but it was to be 109 years before it was converted to standard gauge in 1995, the last inter-capital line to be converted.

=== Narrow gauge ===
Influenced by Queensland Railways' successful adoption of the narrow gauge for cost reasons (opened 1865), and influenced by the advocacy of people such as Abraham Fitzgibbon, South Australia changed the gauge of the Port Wakefield line in the middle of construction. The Port Wakefield line, opened 1870, was originally horse drawn.

Because the narrow gauge lines of 1067 mm (3 ft 6 in) started out as isolated lines from independent ports at Port Wakefield, Port Pirie, Port Augusta, Port Lincoln, Port Broughton, Beachport, Kingston SE and Wallaroo, and a private tramway from Whyalla, the problems of the nascent break of gauge was not immediately apparent. When the broad and narrow systems finally met at Hamley Bridge, Terowie, Wolseley and Mount Gambier endless complaints started. There may have been even more breaks of gauge, as the original bridge at Murray Bridge was designed for narrow gauge.

The horse-drawn narrow gauge Port Broughton railway line on the Yorke Peninsula was never connected to the main system.

The lines on the Eyre Peninsula Railway and throughout the mid-north were built to 1067 mm (3 ft 6 in) narrow gauge. Once the narrow gauge from Port Pirie to Broken Hill was converted to standard gauge, the narrow gauge from Terowie was converted to broad gauge to Peterborough. Peterborough became the change of gauge station for Broken Hill Adelaide express. The narrow gauge line was retained north from Peterborough to Quorn.

The main interstate links from Adelaide to Perth, Darwin, Melbourne, and Sydney are all of 1435 mm (4 ft 8 1/2 in) standard gauge.

== Operators ==
The country railways were initially owned by South Australian Railways. The narrow gauge lines north and west of Quorn were handed over to the Commonwealth Railways in 1926, though the Commonwealth had had financial responsibility for these lines since 1911. The Commonwealth Railways later merged with the SAR to become the Australian National Railways Commission in 1978.

The metropolitan railway lines are now owned and operated by Adelaide Metro, interstate passenger services operated by Journey Beyond, intrastate freight by Aurizon, and interstate freight by a number of companies including Bowmans Rail, Aurizon, Pacific National and SCT Logistics.

== Passenger services ==
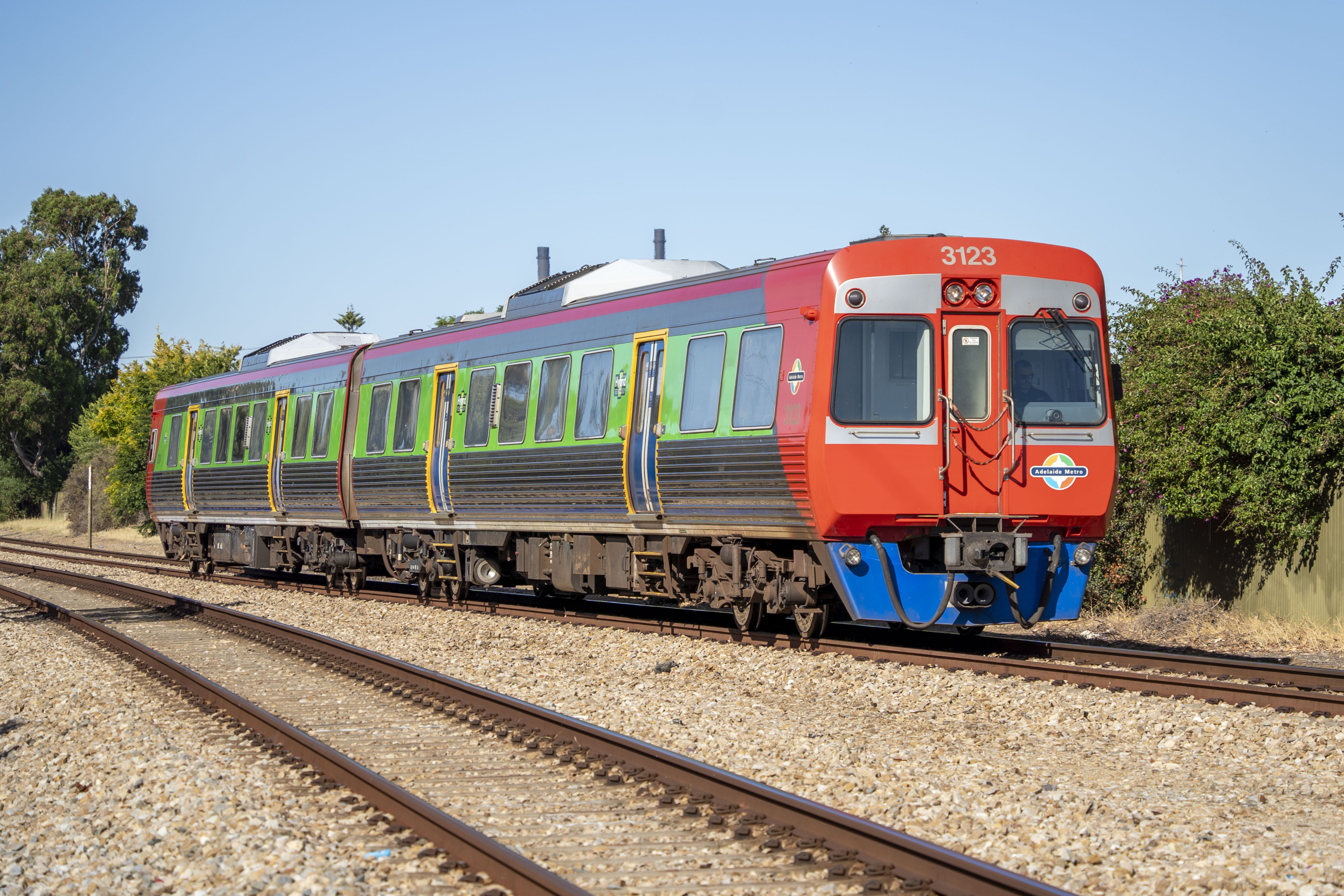
Adelaide Metro 3100 class railcar as used on Adelaide's non-electric suburban services

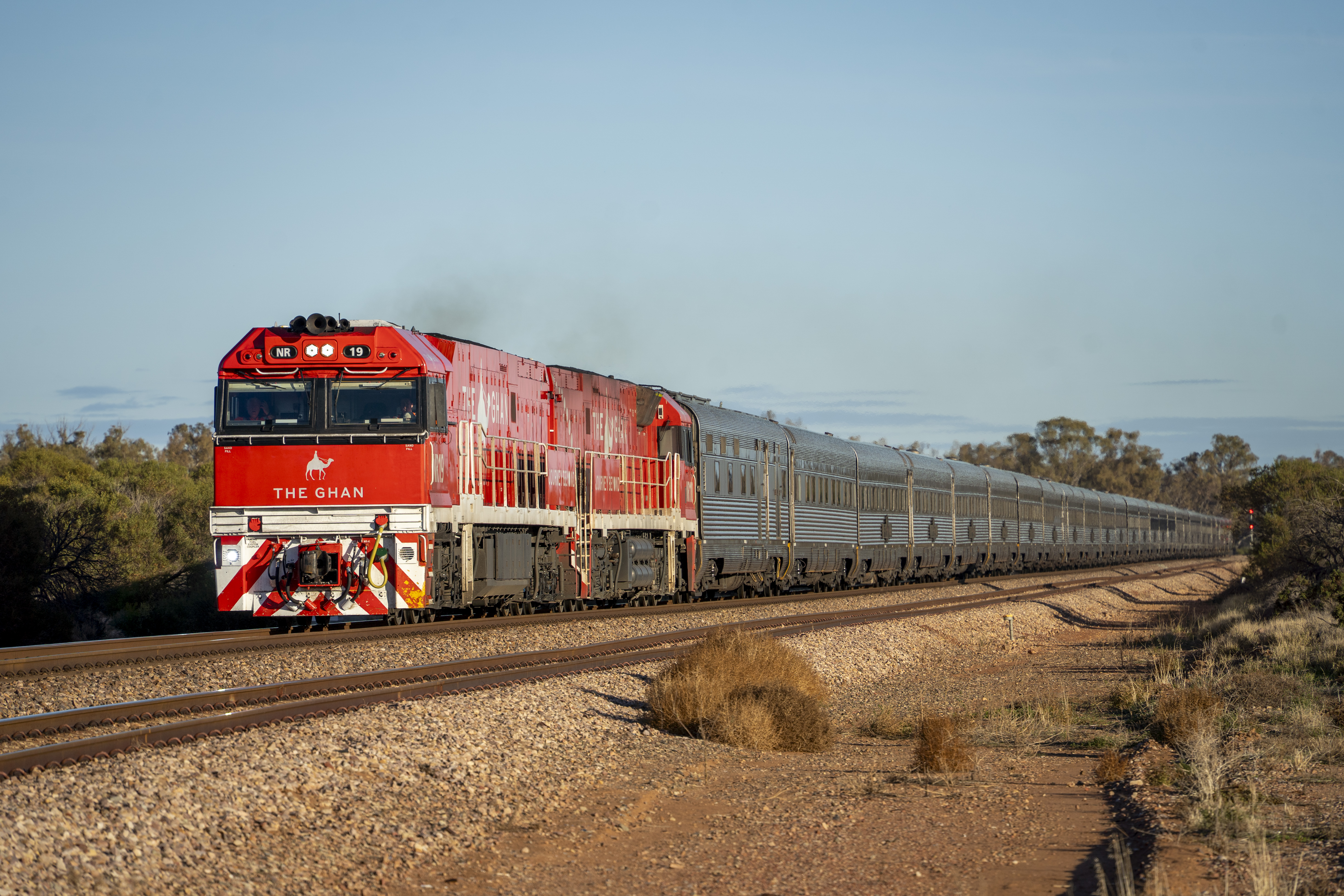
The Journey Beyond Rail Adelaide-Darwin passenger train The Ghan passing through Nectar Brook in July 2025

In the Adelaide Metro suburban network, there are 89 stations on seven lines. Vehicles are diesel-powered railcars and, following electrification of the Gawler, Seaford and Flinders lines, electric multiple-unit trains.

Country passenger services were discontinued in 1990; today the only services beyond suburban Adelaide are long-distance experiential tourism trains operated by Journey Beyond – The Ghan from Adelaide to Darwin, the Indian Pacific between Perth and Sydney, and the summer-months Great Southern between Adelaide and Brisbane via Adelaide The Overland between Adelaide and Melbourne.

== Railway preservation ==
Port Adelaide is home to the National Railway Museum, the largest undercover railway museum in Australia. The SteamRanger Heritage Railway in the Adelaide Hills has restored a number of steam and diesel locomotives for tourist services on the Victor Harbor railway line, operating between Mount Barker and Victor Harbor. The Pichi Richi Railway Preservation Society based in Quorn operates on part of the former Central Australia Railway. The Steamtown Heritage Rail Centre is a static railway museum based in the former railway workshops in Peterborough.

Other former heritage operations have operated including the Lions Club of YP Rail (Wallaroo–Kadina), Limestone Coast Railway (on the Mount Gambier railway line from Mount Gambier railway station), Cobdogla Steam Friends, Steamtown Peterborough Railway Preservation Society (Peterborough–Eurelia) and the Australian Society of Section Car Operators (accreditation in SA surrendered in 2010).

== Timeline ==
- 1854: Horsedrawn tram from Goolwa to Port Elliot
- 1856: First 1600 mm (5 ft 3 in) broad-gauge line, from Adelaide to Port Adelaide, opens
- 1857: Adelaide–Gawler opened
- 1860: Gawler line extended through Roseworthy to Kapunda
- 1862: Private broad gauge horse-drawn tramway between Wallaroo and Kadina
- 1864: Horsedrawn tram extended to Victor Harbor
- 1866: Wallaroo line extended to Moonta
- 1869: First 1067 mm (3 ft 6 in) narrow-gauge line opens from Port Wakefield through Balaklava to Hoyleton – isolated from broad gauge system. Originally horse-drawn railway
- 1870: Roseworthy junction created, with line through Hamley Bridge and Riverton to Burra, South Australia
- 1876: Narrow gauge line from Kingston SE to Naracoorte
- 1876: Port Broughton railway line between Port Broughton and Mundoora
- 1877: Wallaroo lines acquired by South Australian Railways
- 1878: Port Wakefield to Kadina narrow gauge opened and continued to Wallaroo adjacent to the broad gauge line.
- 1878: Narrow gauge branch from Balaklava to Hamley Bridge, creating the state's first break of gauge
- 1878: Kapunda line extended to the Murray River at Morgan
- 1878: Semaphore railway line opened
- 1879: Kadina junction to Snowtown opened
- 1879: Narrow gauge between Beachport, Millicent and Mount Gambier
- 1879: Narrow gauge line from Port Augusta reaches Quorn.
- 1880: Broad gauge lines reach Terowie and Gladstone
- 1881–1882: Narrow gauge built from Peterborough south to Terowie and north through Orroroo to Quorn
- 1883: South Line reaches Nairne through the Adelaide Hills
- 1883: Great Northern Line extended from Quorn to Hergott Springs (Marree)
- 1884: South Line reaches Murray Bridge
- 1884: Victor Harbor tramway strengthened to carry steam trains and extended to meet the South Line at Mount Barker Junction. A branch was also built from Sandergrove to Milang.
- 1886: Branch from Monarto on the South Line to Cambrai
- 1887: Railways of South Australia and Victoria meet at Serviceton
- 1887: Narrow gauge Mount Gambier to Naracoorte and Wolseley creating break-of-gauge junction at Wolseley on the Melbourne line
- 1888: Narrow gauge line built from Port Pirie to Broken Hill, New South Wales
- 1891: Great Northern Railway extended from Hergott Springs to Orroroo
- 1894: Snowtown branch extended to Brinkworth joining the Hamley Bridge-Gladstone railway line
- 1906: Pinnaroo railway line opened
- 1907: The first stage of Eyre Peninsula Railway opened from Port Lincoln to Cummins
- 1908: Port Adelaide line extended to Outer Harbor
- 1911: Gawler junction created, with Barossa line to Angaston
- 1913: Paringa railway line opened through Karoonda and Alawoona to the Brown's Well district near the state border, then extended north to Paringa by the end of the year
- 1914: Loxton railway line opened from Alawoona
- 1914: Waikerie railway line opened from Karoonda
- 1914: Peebinga railway line opened from Karoonda
- 1914: Robertstown railway line opened from Eudunda
- 1915: Willunga railway line completed
- 1917: First standard gauge line completed between Port Augusta and Kalgoorlie, Western Australia, requiring a break-of-gauge at Terowie, Port Augusta and Kalgoorlie to reach Perth
- 1917: broad gauge from Mount Gambier to Heywood near Portland in Victoria
- 1918: Branch from Balhannah on the Melbourne line to Mount Pleasant
- 1919: Railways of South Australia and New South Wales meet at Broken Hill railway station, with a break-of-gauge
- 1919: Branch from Riverton to Clare
- 1919: Sedan railway line opened from Monarto South
- 1922: Clare line extended to Spalding
- 1925: Line from Wanbi to Yinkanie ("Moorook railway line") opened
- 1925: Junction at Salisbury on the Gawler line to Redhill
- 1927: Yorke Peninsula lines converted from narrow to broad gauge to connect to the line from Salisbury, along with the Hamley Bridge-Gladstone line
- 1928: Paringa railway line extended over the Murray River to Renmark, Berri and Barmera
- 1929: Great Northern Line extended to Alice Springs and renamed to Central Australia Railway
- 1937: Trans-Australian Railway extended to Port Pirie Junction and the broad gauge railway from Adelaide to Redhill extended to Port Pirie Ellen Street
- 1940: Finsbury railway line opened
- 1940: Hendon railway line opened
- 1941: Penfield railway line opened
- 1950: Port Broughton-Mundoora closed
- 1950s: Southeastern narrow gauge lines converted to broad gauge, except that Beachport–Millicent and Wandilo–Glencoe were closed in 1957
- 1957: Standard gauge Marree railway line replaced the narrow gauge line on a route west of the Flinders Ranges
- 1963: Balhannah-Mount Pleasant closed
- 1964: Monarto South-Sedan curtailed to Cambrai
- 1969: Willunga railway line closed from Hallett Cove
- 1969: Morgan line curtailed to Eudunda
- 1970: Port Pirie to Broken Hill standard gauge line officially opened, completing the Sydney – Perth rail link, and creating triple-gauge stations at Gladstone and Peterborough (once Terowie–Peterborough was converted from narrow to broad gauge)
- 1971: Yinkanie railway line closed
- 1970s: Southeastern lines closed or abandoned
- 1972: Whyalla railway line opened from Port Augusta (standard gauge)
- 1978: Noarlunga Centre railway line extended from Hallett Cove
- 1978: Semaphore railway line closed
- 1979: Finsbury railway line closed
- 1980: Tarcoola to Alice Springs 1435 mm (4 ft 8 1/2 in) standard-gauge railway opened, first stage of the Tarcoola-Darwin line
- 1980: Hendon railway line closed
- 1982: Adelaide to Crystal Brook standard gauge railway opened to replace broad gauge from Salisbury to Port Pirie, connecting Adelaide to the standard gauge network
- 1984: Riverton-Spalding closed
- 1987: Kingston–Naracoorte closed
- 1987: Monarto South-Cambrai curtailed to Apamurra
- 1990: Waikerie and Peebinga lines closed
- 1990: Robertstown line closed
- 1991: Penfield railway line closed
- 1994: Eudunda line curtailed to Kapunda
- 1995: Adelaide to Melbourne gauge converted from broad gauge to standard gauge under the Federal Government's One Nation project (isolated broad gauge southeastern lines stopped being used)
- 1998 Pinnaroo and Loxton lines converted to standard gauge to reconnect at Tailem Bend
- 2005: Monarto South-Apamurra closed
- 2008: State Government announces budget which includes plans to electrify the Noarlunga, Outer Harbor and Gawler lines
- 2014: Noarlunga Centre line extended to Seaford and electric trains commence service along the Seaford and Tonsley lines
- 2014: Barossa Valley line closed
- 2015: Pinnaroo and Loxton lines mothballed
- 2019: Eyre Peninsula Railway line closed
- 2022: Gawler line is electrified

The first South Australian steam-operated line was built as a broad gauge (5 ft 3 in (1,600 mm)) line in 1856 between the city and Port Adelaide stopping at Bowden, Woodville and Alberton. This line is now part of the Adelaide suburban network and has been proposed for standardisation and conversion to light rail. It was extended as the Outer Harbor line to Outer Harbor in 1908. A branch was built to Grange in 1882. It was extended as the Henley Beach line to Henley Beach in 1894 and closed in 1957.

== Development of the lines ==
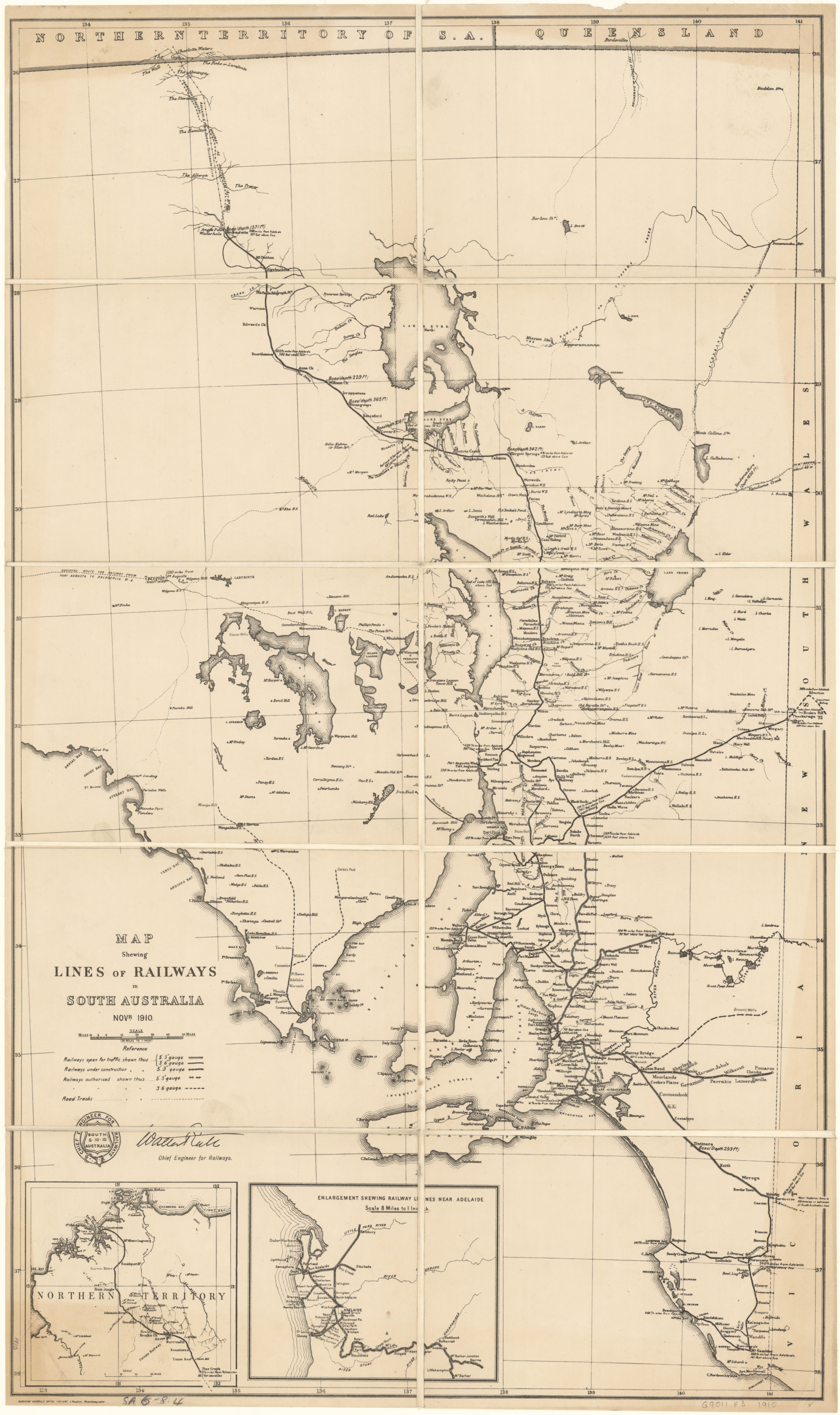
Map of railways extant and proposed in 1910 in South Australia

=== Southern Lines ===
The South Line, through the Adelaide Hills, was opened to Aldgate, Nairne in 1883, Murray Bridge in 1884 and Bordertown and Serviceton, Victoria, connecting with Victorian Railways in 1887. This line was standardised in 1995.

A branch line was built to Marino in 1913, and extended to Willunga in 1915. The section from Hallett Cove to Willunga was closed in 1969. In the 1970s the line was extended south from Hallett Cove, becoming what is now the Adelaide Metro Seaford railway line. It reached Christie Downs in 1976, Noarlunga Centre in 1978, with a further extension to Seaford in 2014.

The beginning of the Victor Harbour line was a horse-drawn 1600 mm (5 ft 3 in) broad-gauge railway built from the port of Goolwa on the Murray River to an ocean harbour at Port Elliot in 1854. This line was used to move freight between the shallow-draft vessels navigating the Murray, and coastal and ocean-going vessels, without either having to traverse the narrow and shallow mouth of the river with unpredictable currents. It was later extended from Port Elliot to Victor Harbor in 1864 and from Goolwa to Strathalbyn in 1869. It was extended to Mount Barker Junction on the South Line in 1884 and strengthened to carry steam trains.

A branch from the South Line between the Mount Lofty Ranges and Murray River was built to Monarto and Cambrai in 1886. It was shortened to Apamurra near Palmer before being converted then closed briefly due to the standardisation of the Adelaide – Melbourne line in 1995. The line was then converted to standard gauge later in 1995 until it then closed again in 2005.

In the Murray Mallee, the Pinnaroo line was built from Tailem Bend to Pinnaroo in 1906. This was connected with the Victorian Railways at the Victorian border and Ouyen by 1915. The South Australian part of this line was converted to standard gauge in 1998 to reconnect it with the Adelaide – Melbourne line. This created a break-of-gauge at Pinnaroo. The last traffic on the line was transporting grain from silos to Port Adelaide. Viterra announced that no more grain would be carried by rail on this line after 31 July 2015, with the 2015 harvest to be entirely transported by road.

The Barmera railway line opened from Tailem Bend through Karoonda to Wanbi on 6 January 1913, extended to Paruna on 1 May and Meribah on 7 May 1913 (both in the Brown's Well district). While this line was still being built, the Government of South Australia approved several spur lines from it to open up more than a million acres of farmland. These were:

- Waikerie railway line Karoonda north to Waikerie (opened December 1914)closed 14 March 1990 to Galga, 4 March 1994 to Karoonda
- Alawoona north to Loxton (opened February 1914) closed 2015
- Brown's Well north to Paringa (opened October 1913), closed to Alawoona December 1990 then Tailem Bend August 2015
- The Peebinga railway line east from Karoonda covering the gap between the Pinnaroo and Brown's Well lines, opened 18 December 1914, closed 7 December 1990.

The government expected these lines to not recover the cost in the short term, but to open up land for farming wheat to "strengthen the backbone of South Australia". They were built using second-hand rails, and were the first in the state to use steel sleepers.

Later, the Moorook railway line was opened from Wanbi to Yinkanie (near Moorook) in September 1925, but closed in 1971. In 1928 the line was opened from Paringa to Renmark and Barmera; it closed in 1990.

The last of these lines was the Loxton railway line which was converted to standard gauge in 1998. It closed with the transfer of the grain traffic to road after July 2015. Viterra announced that no more grain would be carried by rail in the region after 31 July 2015, with the 2015 harvest to be entirely transported by road.

==== Southern narrow gauge lines ====
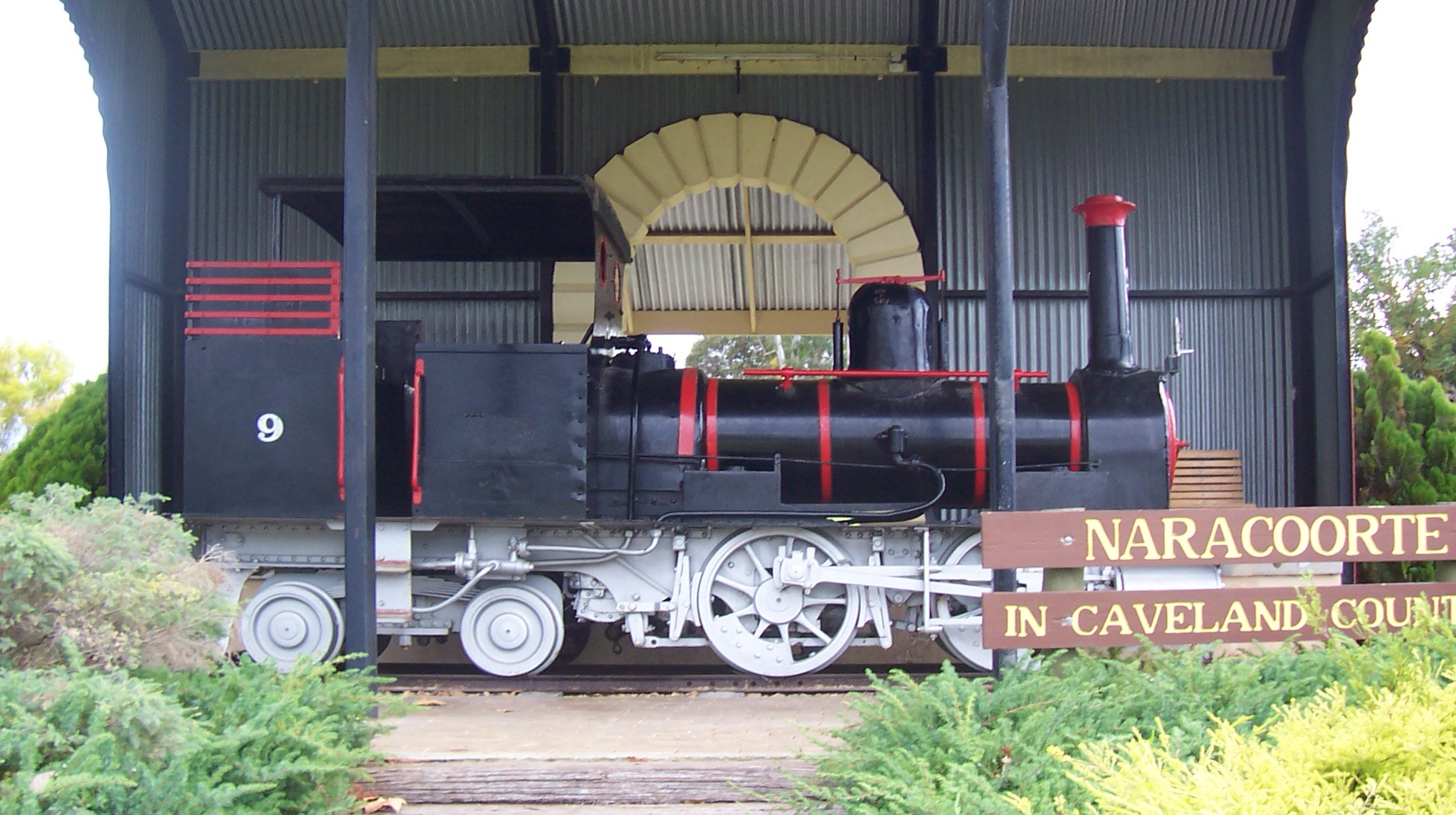
South Australian Railways V class locomotive no. 9 commenced service on the narrow-gauge Kingston–Naracoorte railway in 1877. It was transferred to the Northern Division of the SAR in 1888 and was not retired until 1953.

In 1876 a 1067 mm (3 ft 6 in) narrow-gauge line known as the Kingston-Naracoorte railway line was built from Kingston SE to Naracoorte. In 1879, a railway was built between Beachport, Millicent and Mount Gambier. In 1887 they were linked by a line from Mount Gambier to Naracoorte and Wolseley on the broad gauge Melbourne–Adelaide railway, creating a break-of-gauge junction at Wolseley. It later had a branch line added from Wandilo to Glencoe.

The Mount Gambier-Heywood railway line, a broad gauge line, was opened between Mount Gambier and Heywood near Portland in 1917. From 1953 to 1956, the southeastern lines were converted to broad gauge, with the exception of the Beachport – Millicent and the Wandilo – Glencoe line, which were closed down in 1957. The Kingston – Naracoorte was closed on 28 November 1987. The other southeastern lines, including the line to Heywood, have been out of use since the standardisation of the Adelaide – Melbourne and Maroona – Portland lines on 12 April 1995. There are regular calls for their standardisation.

=== Northern lines ===
==== Broad gauge lines ====
In 1857 the 42 km (26 mi) Gawler line was built to Gawler station, which was rural at the time, and extended to Roseworthy, Kapunda in 1860. The main line left the Kapunda branch at Roseworthy and proceeded to Hamley Bridge, Riverton, Burra in 1870. The Kapunda branch was extended to Morgan in 1878. The Burra line was extended to Terowie in 1880.

The Barossa Valley railway line was built from Gawler Junction, north of Gawler station, through what is now Gawler Central station, to Nuriootpa and Angaston in the Barossa Valley in 1911. A further branch was constructed from Nuriootpa to Stockwell and Truro. The Penrice branch to the quarry from near Stockwell was the last destination to operate beyond Gawler Central.

A branch line was built from Riverton to Clare in 1919 and Spalding in 1922. This line was lifted in the early 80s and parts of it have been restored as the Rattler Trail (Riverton to Auburn) and Riesling Trail (Auburn to Clare), a bicycle and walking trail through the Clare Valley.

In 1925, a broad gauge line was built from Salisbury to Redhill and in 1937, it was extended to Port Pirie to meet the extension of the standard gauge from Port Augusta. This line was converted to standard gauge in 1982, including a deviation at the northern end to move the rail junction from Port Pirie to Crystal Brook.

=== Western Division narrow gauge lines ===
The lines in the Mid North (generally north of Goyder's Line, which is the limit of 250 millimetres (9.8 inches) annual rainfall) were built to narrow gauge.

==== Upper Yorke Peninsula lines ====
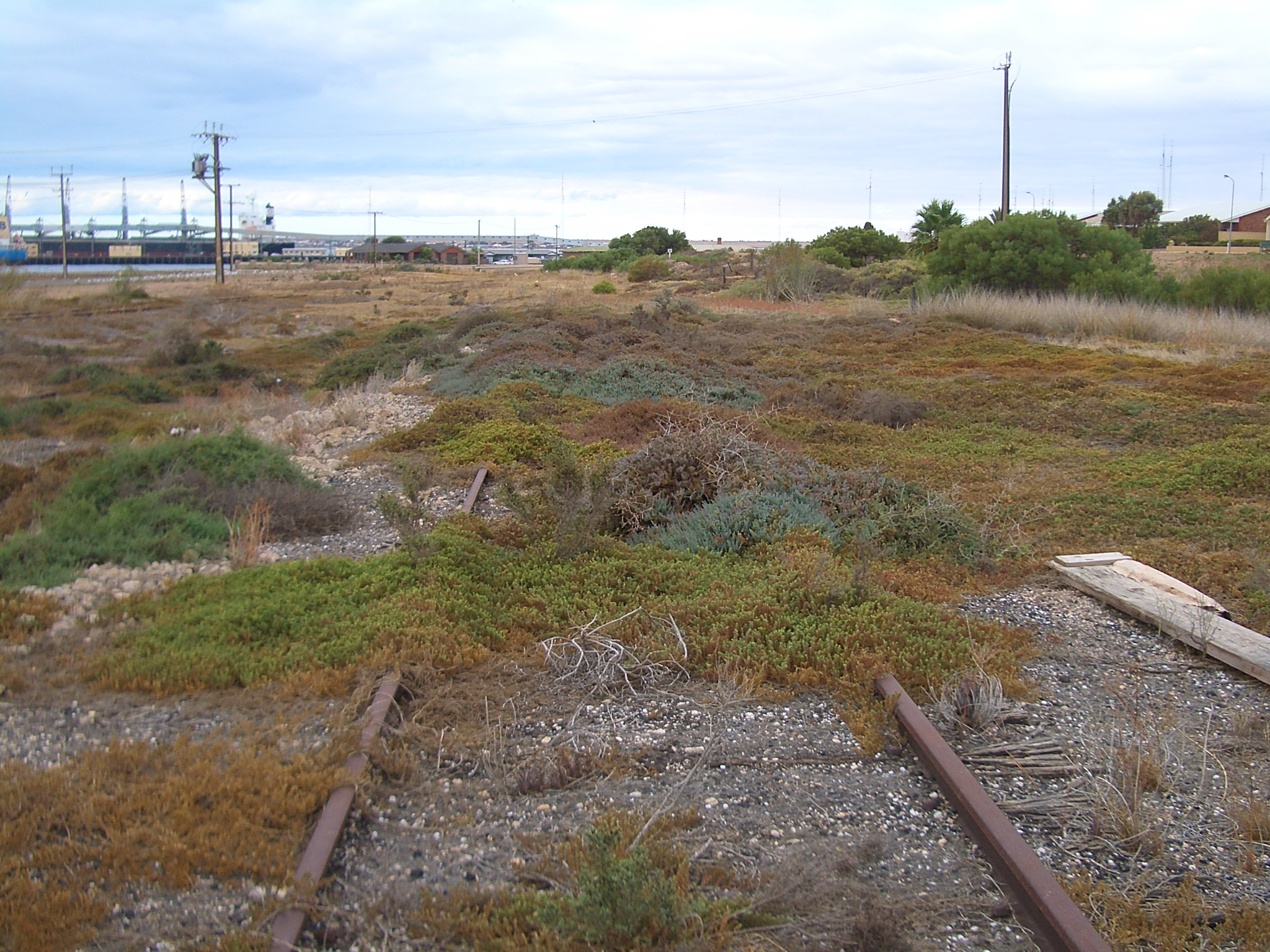
Broad-gauge tracks at the defunct Wallaroo railway station

The first narrow gauge line ran from Port Wakefield to Hoyleton, opened in 1870 and branched from Balaklava to Hamley Bridge in 1878, creating Australia's first break-of-gauge on the government railways.

A horse-drawn tramway was built by the Kadina and Wallaroo Railway and Pier Company between Wallaroo and Kadina in 1862 and extended to Moonta in 1866. This was acquired by the South Australian Railways in 1877 and a new narrow gauge line was built along its route and connected to Port Wakefield in about 1878. A line was built from Brinkworth to Snowtown, Bute and Kadina in 1879. These lines were converted to broad gauge in 1927. All the lines west of the Adelaide–Crystal Brook standard gauge line and the line from Snowtown to Brinkworth were closed after the Adelaide – Crystal Brook line was opened in 1982, despite proposals to convert some of them to standard gauge.

There are calls to convert the Wolseley to Mount Gambier line to standard gauge. This partly reflects the lifting of restriction on the road transportation of grain Australia-wide that followed recommendations of the 1986-88 Royal Commission into grain storage, handling and transport. This particularly affected South Australian railways because of the short distances between the growing areas and its various wheat exporting ports. The Snowtown to Wallaroo Broad Gauge was converted to Dual Gauge (Standard/Broad) during the late 1980s.

==== North Mount Lofty Ranges lines ====
A line was built from Balaklava to Brinkworth and Gladstone by 1880 and later extended to Wilmington. The Hamley Bridge – Balaklava – Brinkworth – Gladstone line was converted to broad gauge in 1927, making Gladstone a break-of-gauge junction. In 1969, when the line from Port Pirie to Broken Hill was converted to standard gauge, Gladstone became a three-gauge break-of-gauge junction (together with Peterborough and succeeding Port Pirie, which had been reduced to two gauges). In the 1980s, the broad gauge line north of Balaklava and the narrow gauge line were closed, leaving Gladstone as a purely standard gauge station.

A narrow-gauge line was built from Terowie to Peterborough in 1881. It was during a change of train at the Terowie break-of-gauge station in 1942 that General Douglas MacArthur uttered his famous remark, "I came through and I shall return". The break of gauge was not overcome until 1970, when the Terowie–Peterborough line was converted to 1600 mm (5 ft 3 in) broad gauge to meet new the standard gauge from Port Pirie to Broken Hill. It was abandoned by 1988.

The narrow-gauge line was extended to Orroroo also in 1881 and Quorn in 1882, connecting with the new line from Port Augusta. This line has now been abandoned.

A narrow gauge railway was built from Port Pirie to Gladstone, Peterborough and Broken Hill, in 1888 to serve the Broken Hill silver and lead mine, which was becoming the largest and richest of its kind in the world. Since the New South Wales Government would not allow the South Australia railway to cross the border, the last 30 km (19 mi) was built by a private company as a tramway, the Silverton Tramway from Cockburn to Silverton and Broken Hill. In 1970 the line was converted to standard gauge, completing the transcontinental line from Sydney to Perth.

=== The Great Northern Railway ===
The Great Northern Railway was completed from Port Augusta across the Pichi Richi Pass to Quorn in 1879, Hergott Springs (now known as Marree) in 1883 and Oodnadatta in 1891. It was extended to Alice Springs by the Commonwealth Railways in 1929, when it was renamed the Central Australia Railway.

In 1957, the new standard gauge line was built from Stirling North (near Port Augusta) to Marree on a new alignment west of the Flinders Ranges and the narrow gauge line between Hawker and Marree was abandoned. The remainder of the narrow gauge line between Stirling North, Quorn and Hawker was abandoned in 1972, although the Stirling North – Quorn section has been taken over by the Pichi Richi tourist railway (with a more recent extension into the town of Port Augusta completed in 2001). The narrow gauge line from Marree to Alice Springs was abandoned with the opening of the new standard gauge railway from Tarcoola to Alice Springs in 1980. The standard gauge line from Stirling North has since been abandoned north of the Leigh Creek Coalfield.

=== Eyre Peninsula lines ===
The isolated SAR Port Lincoln Division was built to 1067 mm (3 ft 6 in) narrow gauge, all of it lightly built since its purpose was to promote agricultural development of the area. Construction started with a railway between Port Lincoln and Cummins, opened in 1907. The network grew until 1950, when its length was 767 kilometres (477 miles). It was vitally important in its early days since roads were few and unmade; communities throughout the Eyre Peninsula relied totally on the SAR for transport of their produce to port, supplies for their everyday needs, and passenger transport. As roads improved, however, "roadside goods" traffic declined, usually to one train a week, and passenger services ceased in 1968. Meanwhile, from the mid-1960s, a transition took place from bagged grain traffic in open wagons to bulk grain hopper wagons in point-to-point unit trains, vastly improving efficiency. The system ended in 2019 when grain distributor Viterra moved to road haulage. As of 2023, the only remaining operational part of the original Port Lincoln Division was the 65 kilometres (40 miles) long Lake Macdonnell–Thevenard railway, on which Aurizon ran three gypsum unit trains a day.

The steel industry company, BHP, developed two separate systems on the peninsula. The so-called BHP Whyalla Tramway, a 112 kilometres (70 miles) long 1067 mm (3 ft 6 in) heavy-haul iron ore line from the Middleback Range to the Whyalla Steelworks, opened in 1901 and is still operational. The Coffin Bay Tramway, also a heavy-haul line but built to 1435 mm (4 ft 8 1/2 in), opened in 1966 and closed in 1989. It conveyed mineral sand 39 km (24 mi) from Coffin Bay to Proper Bay on the outskirts of Port Lincoln.

=== Northern Territory railway ===
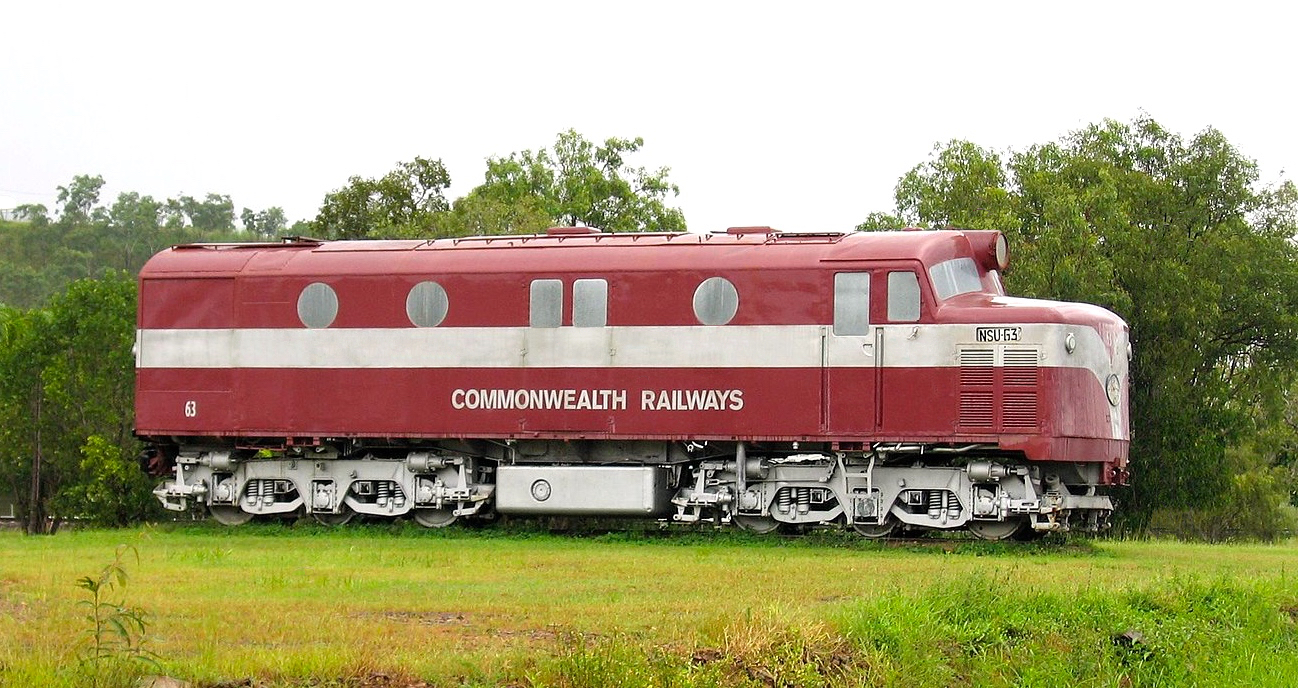
An NSU class diesel locomotive, mainstay of the Central Australia Railway and the North Australia Railway since the 1950s, on display at the Adelaide River Rail Heritage Precinct

The Northern Territory was part of South Australia from 1863 to 1911, when it was transferred to Commonwealth control.

The Palmerston and Pine Creek Railway was a narrow gauge 1067 mm (3 ft 6 in) railway that ran from Darwin, once known as Palmerston, to Pine Creek.

The John Cox Bray Government in South Australia introduced the Palmerston and Pine Creek Railway Bill in 1883. The £959,300 contract went to C & E Millar of Melbourne on the proviso that they could use Asian labourers. The line reached Pine Creek in 1888 and was officially opened on 30 September 1889. Singhalese and Indian gangs did the grubbing and earthwork and 3000 Chinese labourers laid more than 1 kilometre (0.6 miles) of track per day. A total of 310 bridges and flood openings were built.

The Commonwealth Government took over the line in 1911 and renamed it the Northern Territory Railway. The line was extended to Katherine in 1917. Further extensions in the 1920s saw it eventually reach Birdum, just south of Larrimah, in 1929, when it was further renamed the North Australia Railway, to distinguish it from the Central Australia Railway, which reached Alice Springs from the south in the same year.

Although a railway line from Alice Springs to Darwin had been discussed for many years, the North Australia Railway was closed in 1976. However eventually the standard gauge Adelaide to Darwin Railway was finally completed on 17 September 2003 with the line between Alice Springs and Darwin. The first freight train reached Darwin on 17 January 2004.

== List of country railways in South Australia ==
=== Mid North ===
- Morgan railway line: Adelaide – Kapunda (1860), extended to Morgan in 1878, with junctions at Gawler and Roseworthy (now closed and dismantled beyond Kapunda)
- Port Wakefield railway line: Port Wakefield – Balaklava – Hoyleton (opened 1870, closed and dismantled)
- Port Broughton railway line: Port Broughton – Mundoora (1876) was horse-drawn uphill, and gravity-powered to carry bagged wheat down to the port (now closed and dismantled)
- Peterborough railway line: Roseworthy – Burra (1870), later extended to Terowie (1880), then Peterborough, with junctions at Hamley Bridge and Riverton (now closed and dismantled beyond Burra)
- Gladstone railway line: Hamley Bridge – Balaklava, continuing through Brinkworth to Gladstone (now closed and dismantled beyond Balaklava)
- Balaklava–Moonta railway line: Balaklava – Kadina – Wallaroo – Moonta (1862 horse-drawn between Wallaroo and Kadina, 1878 to Port Wakefield, now closed and dismantled)
- Brinkworth–Kadina railway line: Brinkworth – Snowtown – Bute – Kadina (1879, now closed)
- Robertstown railway line: Eudunda - Robertstown (now closed and dismantled)
- Barossa Valley railway line: Gawler to Penrice and Angaston in the Barossa Valley, the Penrice Stone Train carried limestone from a quarry at Penrice to soda works at Osborne, near Port Adelaide until June 2014 – (now mothballed)
- Spalding railway line: Riverton to Clare and Spalding – closed, the easement is now used for the Riesling and Rattler rail trails through the lower Mid North and Clare Valley
- Adelaide-Port Augusta railway line (part): Adelaide – Port Pirie

=== Branches from the Melbourne line ===
- Mount Pleasant line (1918): Balhannah to Mount Pleasant via Oakbank, Woodside, Mount Torrens and Birdwood. Closed 1963 (tracks have since been totally removed)
- Victor Harbor line: Mount Barker to Goolwa and Victor Harbor
  - Milang line (1884–1968): Sandergrove to Milang via Nurragi. A 13 kilometre spur line opened in 1884 and closed in 1970 (line dismantled)
- Sedan line (1919): Monarto South north to Sedan (shortened to Apamurra before being closed). The rails from that section were reused in 2001 by the Pichi Richi Railway to extend their narrow gauge track from Stirling North to Port Augusta
- Pinnaroo line (1907): Tailem Bend (south east of Murray Bridge) to Pinnaroo continuing into Victoria to Ouyen (mothballed in 2015)
- Barmera railway line (1913): Tailem Bend – Karoonda – Meribah with later extensions to Paringa (Oct 1913), Renmark and Barmera(closed and dismantled)
  - Waikerie line: Karoonda to Waikerie (closed and dismantled)
  - Moorook line: Wanbi – Yinkanie (near Moorook) (Closed and dismantled)
  - Loxton line: Alawoona – Loxton (mothballed in 2015)
  - Peebinga line: Karoonda – Peebinga (near the state border between the Brown's Well district and Pinnaroo)
- Mount Gambier line: Wolseley (between Bordertown and the state border) through Naracoorte to Mount Gamber. (closed pending standard gauge conversion)
  - Naracoorte – Kingston SE opened 1877, now closed and dismantled.
  - Wandilo – Glencoe opened 1904, now closed and dismantled. **Mount Gambier – Beachport to the west via Tantanoola and Millicent. Opened 1878, now closed and dismantled from Adelaide Road, Millicent to Beachport.
  - Mount Gambier – Heywood to the east, linking into the Victorian network, near Portland. (closed pending standard gauge conversion)

=== North ===
- Port Pirie – Broken Hill (in stages from 1875, completed 1888, standard gauge since 1970)
- Central Australia Railway: Port Augusta – Quorn (1879) – Marree (1883) – Oodnadatta (1891) – Alice Springs (1929) (narrow gauge) – closed in 1980
- Peterborough–Quorn railway line: Peterborough – Port Augusta via Orroroo and Quorn (1881)
- Port Pirie – Port Augusta (1937)
- Stirling North to Marree line (standard gauge) (1957) replaced the narrow gauge line to Marree. Used to haul coal from Leigh Creek to power stations at Port Augusta until 2016.
- Trans-Australian Railway: Port Augusta – Kalgoorlie, Western Australia – the first standard gauge line, built in 1917
- Port Augusta to Whyalla line (1972) standard gauge
- Tarcoola-Alice Springs line: Tarcoola – Alice Springs (1980)

=== Eyre Peninsula ===
Aurizon owns the Eyre Peninsula Railway lines

- Port Lincoln – Thevenard (west of Ceduna) with junctions at Cummins and Yeelanna.
- Thevenard to Penong (Via Kevin) (Kevin – Penong Surrendered to the Minister for Transport.no longer serviceable)
- Cummins – Buckleboo (north of Kimba) (Kimba – Buckleboo Dormant)
- Yeelanna – Kapinnie (Dormant)

Aurizon manages the BHP Whyalla Tramway

- Whyalla – Iron Knob (private – owned by Arrium) – narrow gauge, opened 1901, carries iron ore
- Whyalla (109 km) – Iron Baron (private – owned by Liberty House Group) opened 1930, extended to Iron Duke in 1990

BHP owned the Coffin Bay Tramway

- Proper Bay (near Port Lincoln) to Coffin Bay to carry lime sand between 1960 and 1989

== See also ==
- Railway accidents in South Australia
