= Nuriootpa railway station =

Former railway station in South Australia, Australia

Nuriootpa
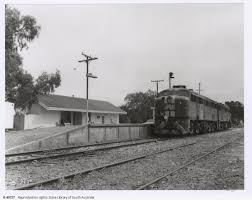
- 930 class locomotive at Nuriootpa (circa 1988)

General information
- Location: The Crescent, Nuriootpa, South Australia
- Coordinates: 34.4794627456716°S 138.99683682658693°E
- Operator: South Australian Railways
- Line: Barossa Valley line
- Distance: 82.6 kilometres from Adelaide
- Platforms: 2
- Tracks: 1

Construction
- Structure type: Ground

Other information
- Status: Closed, mostly demolished

History
- Opened: 8 September 1911
- Closed: December 1968

Services
Preceding station	Aurizon	Following station
Tanunda towards Adelaide	Angaston railway line	Angaston Terminus
Preceding station	Australian National Railways Commission	Following station
Terminus	Truro railway line	Plush's Corner towards Truro
Location

Nuriootpa railway station was located at the junction of the Angaston railway line and the Truro railway line. It served the town of Nuriootpa, South Australia.

== History ==
=== Opening ===
Nuriootpa railway station opened on 8 September 1911 as part of the railway line from Gawler to Angaston. The station facilities included a station building with a standard 1910 SAR station design. It became a junction station on 24 September 1917 with the opening of the railway line to Truro. Appearance of the station was enhanced on 17 November 1932 with renovations, paintings and replanted trees. Railway facilities at Nuriootpa were gradually improved with a 3 ton goods crane being provided along with improvements to the goods shed, passenger accommodations, platforms and sidings.

=== Closure and demolition ===
The station closed to regular passengers on 16 December 1968. In 1978, the station and all associated infrastructure was included in the transfer of South Australian Railways to Australian National. The station ceased to be a junction station in 1990 with the closure of the Truro railway line. The last passenger trains to use the station was the Barossa Wine Train along with some occasional National Railway Museum charter train tours. In 2010, the line between Angaston and Nuriootpa was removed and a shared bike and pedestrian path was put in place. The station building, cream shed and oil store were all demolished in May 2011. The last remaining traffic on the line was the daily Penrice Stone Train which ran from the Penrice Soda Factory to Port Adelaide ceased in June 2014. Most of the station infrastructure including the platforms and goods crane still remain as of 2024 but are disused.
