= Penrice =

Penrice may refer to:

- Penrice, South Australia, a small town in the Barossa Valley in Australia
- Penrice, Swansea, a community in Wales
- Penrice Castle, near Penrice, Swansea
- Penrice Community College, an academy school in St Austell, Cornwall
- Penrice Soda Products, in South Australia
- Penrice (surname)
