= Rowland Flat railway station =

Former railway station in South Australia, Australia

Rowland Flat

General information
- Operator: South Australian Railways
- Line: Barossa Valley line
- Platforms: 1
- Tracks: 1

Construction
- Structure type: Ground

Other information
- Status: Demolished

History
- Opened: 8 September 1911
- Closed: 16 December 1968

Services
Preceding station	Aurizon	Following station
Lyndoch towards Adelaide	Angaston railway line	Tanunda towards Angaston

Rowland Flat railway station was on the Angaston railway line in the town of Rowland Flat, South Australia.

== History ==
Rowland Flat station opened on 8 September 1911 with the opening of the railway line between Gawler and Angaston. The station operated until 16 December 1968 when it closed to regular service. There is no longer any trace of the station.
