= Penrice Soda Products =

Penrice Soda Holdings
- Type: Public
- Traded as: ASX: PSH
- Industry: Mining
- Founded: 1935
- Defunct: 2014
- Headquarters: Adelaide
- Number of locations: Osborne; Penrice
- Area served: South Australia
- Key people: David Trebeck (Chairman); Guy Roberts (Managing Director)
- Revenue: $137.2 million (June 2013)
- Net income: ▼$21.4 million (June 2013)
- Number of employees: 174 (June 2013)
- Website: www.penrice.com.au

Penrice Soda Products was a company founded in 1935 in South Australia. It was listed on the Australian Securities Exchange, named after its quarry near the small town of Penrice, South Australia. It was forced to close its soda ash production plant in Osborne and was placed in liquidation in August 2014.

== History ==
Penrice Soda Products operations were founded by ICI Australia in 1935. The Dry Creek Saltfields and Osborne soda ash plant were acquired from ICI in 1989. The salt fields were sold to Ridley Corporation in 2005. Penrice Soda Products was listed on the Australian Securities Exchange in 2005. It was placed in liquidation in August 2014.

== Operations ==
In addition to its large limestone and marble quarry just north of Angaston, it had a number of other establishments in South Australia, including the only soda ash production facility in Australia, located on the Port River in the north-western Adelaide suburb of Osborne.

On 24 June 2014, Penrice Soda Products announced that it would be closing its Osborne plant, and the Angaston quarry was sold to Adbri in July 2014.

== Transport ==
Penrice Soda Products was the last company in South Australia to use the broad gauge rail network in South Australia with Genesee & Wyoming Australia operating the Penrice Stone Train from the Penrice Quarry on the Barossa Valley line to Penrice Soda Products' soda ash factory in Osborne. It ceased operating in June 2014 when the Osborne factory closed.

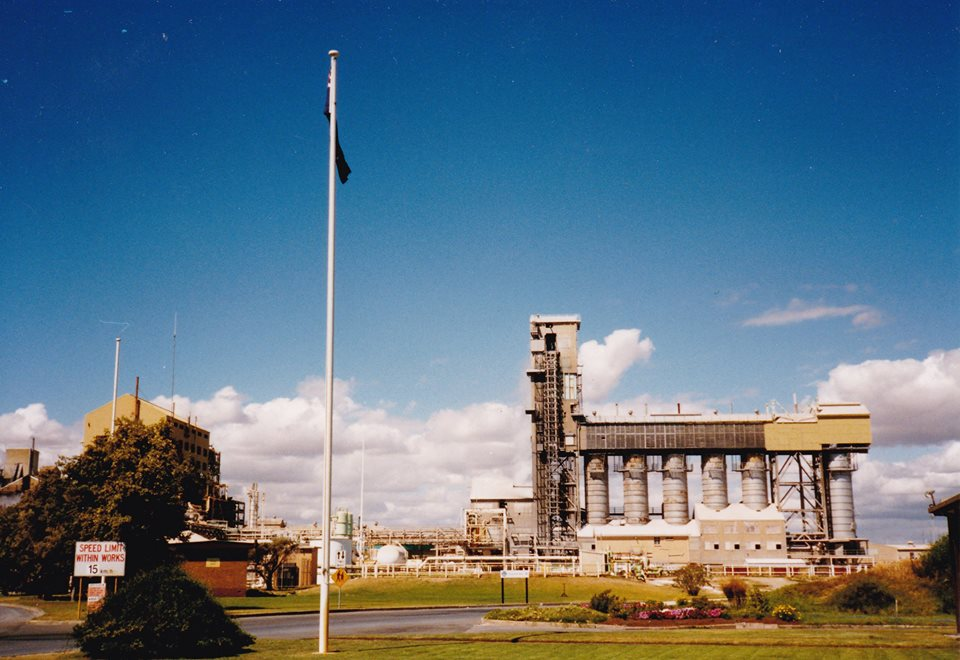
Looking into the plant from the main entrance.

== Soda ash plant ==
The company's soda ash plant at Osborne used steam from the Osborne Power Station, making that establishment Australia's biggest cogeneration facility.

The soda ash plant used salt from the St Kilda lagoons which was (normally) harvested in autumn and piped as a saturated brine solution under the Port River to the plant, and limestone from its Angaston quarry was transported to the plant by the Penrice Stone Train.

Using ammonia, these raw materials were converted to soda ash by the Solvay process. By-products discharged to the Port River included calcium chloride, ammonia, and insoluble residues, known as "calsilt". which required periodic dredging to avoid blocking the shipping channel.

== See also ==
- List of South Australian manufacturing businesses
- South Australian food and drink
