= Tanunda railway station =

Railway station in Southern Australia

Tanunda
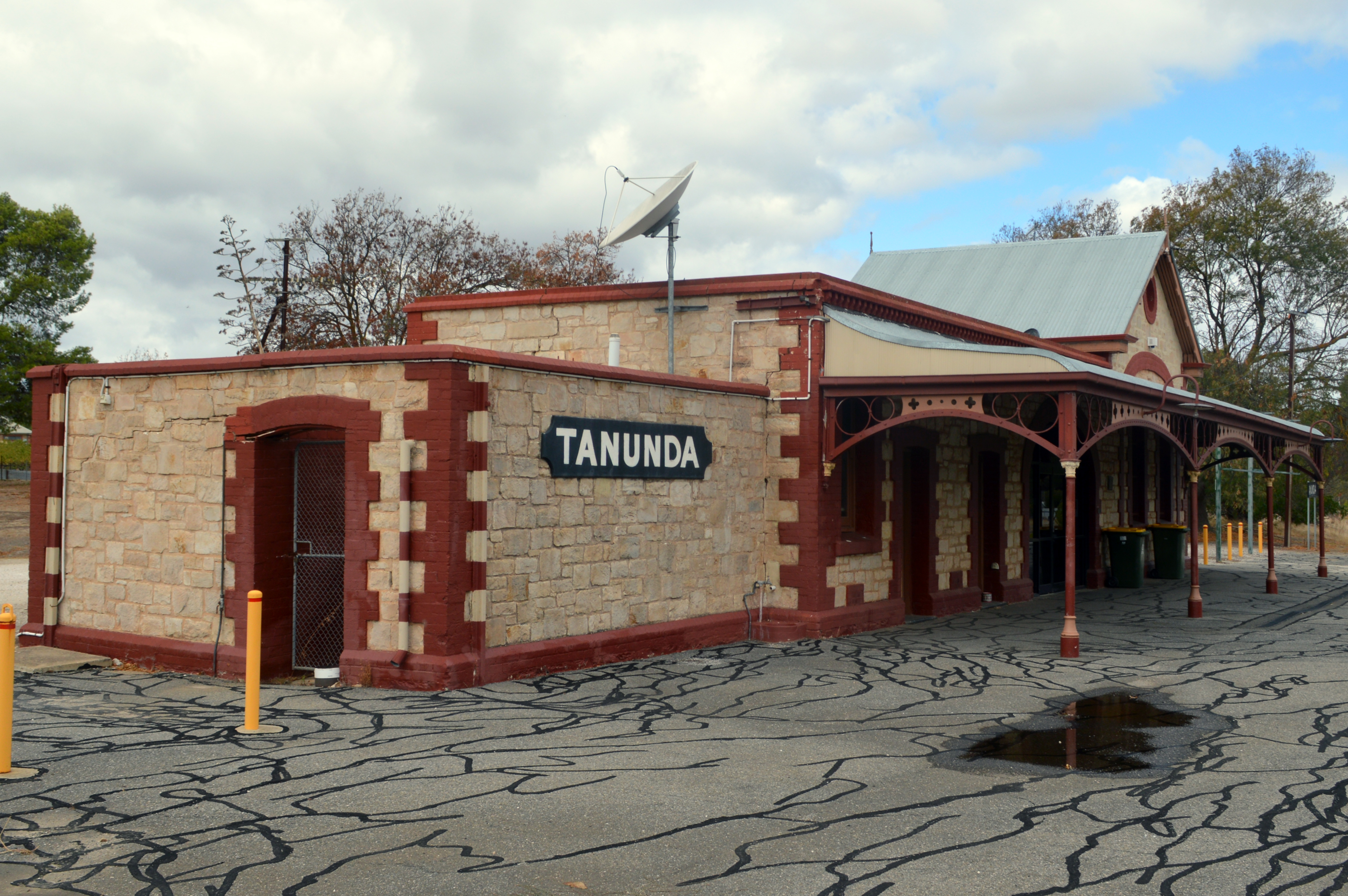
- Former station in 2019

General information
- Location: Bushman Street, Tanunda
- Coordinates: 34.52621°S 138.96166°E
- Line: Barossa Valley
- Distance: 70.2 kilometres from Adelaide
- Platforms: 1

Construction
- Structure type: Ground

History
- Opened: 8 September 1911

Services
Preceding station	Aurizon	Following station
Rowland Flat towards Adelaide	Angaston railway line	Nuriootpa towards Angaston
Location

Tanunda railway station is located on the Barossa Valley line. It served the town of Tanunda.

== History ==
Tanunda station opened on 8 September 1911 when the Barossa Valley line to Angaston opened. In 1913, the original wooden shelter was replaced with the current stone building.

Until the 1970s a pedestrian overpass was provided. The goods and passing sidings were removed in the 1990s but the goods platform and shed remain.

From 1996 to 2003, TransAdelaide ran Sunday-only trial services to Nuriootpa. From 1998 to 2003 the Barossa Wine Train serviced the station.

Local radio station 5BBB has occupied the station building since the mid-1990s.
