= Ebenezer, South Australia =

Ebenezer
- Town
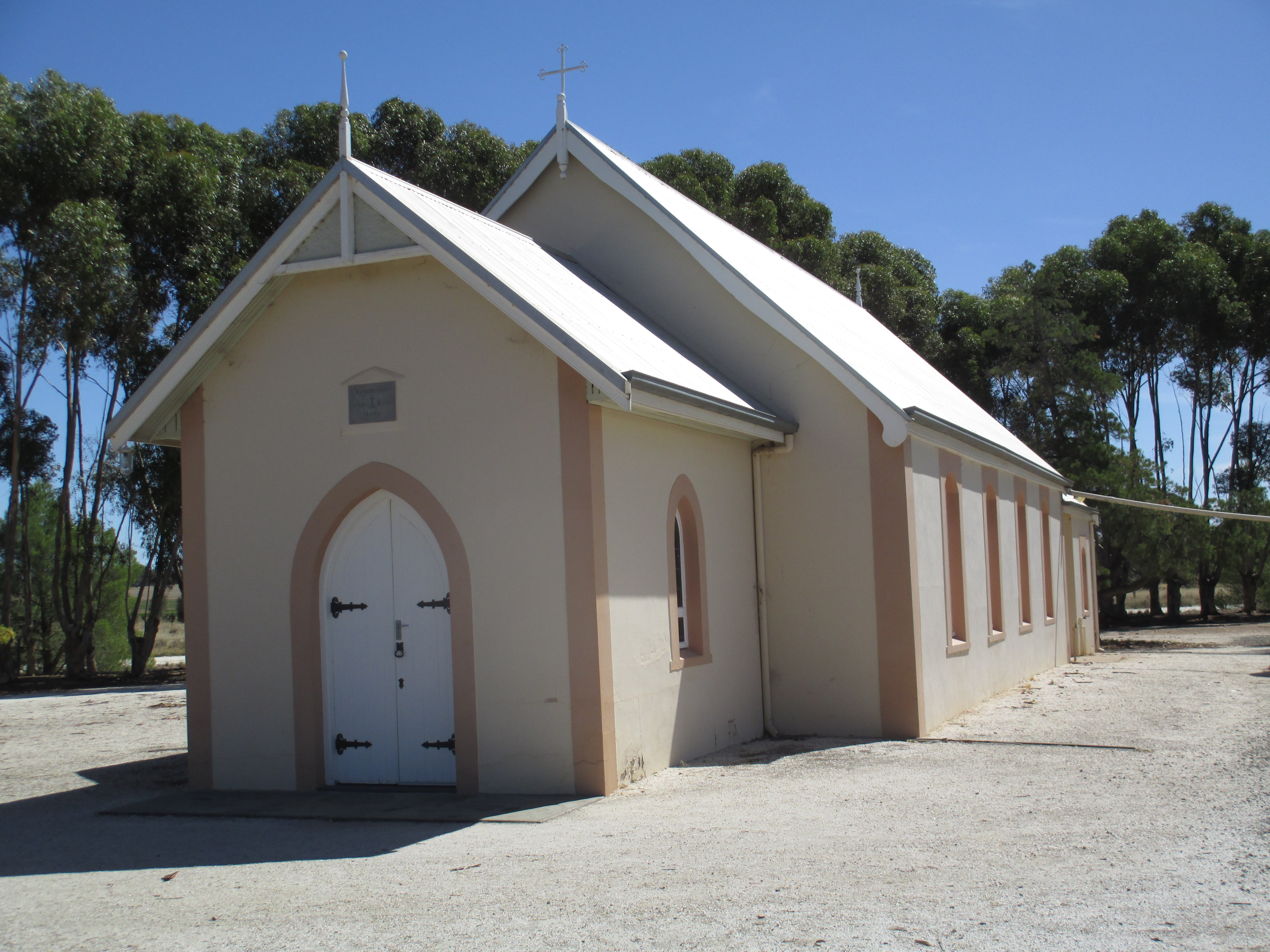
- Neukirch Lutheran church

- Coordinates: 34°25′20″S 139°2′0″E
- Country: Australia
- State: South Australia
- LGA: Light Regional Council
- Location: 9 km (5.6 mi) N of Nuriootpa; 14 km (8.7 mi) SE of Kapunda
- Established: 1852 (sub-division); 16 March 2000 (locality)

Government
  - State electorate: Stuart
  - Federal division: Barker

Population
  - Total: 183 (SAL 2021)
- Postcode: 5355
Localities around Ebenezer
	Koonunga	St Kitts
Moppa	Ebenezer	Truro
Nuriootpa	Light Pass	Stockwell

Ebenezer is a locality in the northern Barossa Valley of South Australia. It includes the historic Ebenezer settlement settled by 72 Wendish Lutherans who had migrated from Silesia in January 1852.

The modern locality of Ebenezer includes the nearby Neukirch (German: [ˈnɔɪ̯kɪʁç]) settlement founded in 1854 by another group of Lutheran immigrants. Neukirch was renamed to Dimchurch in 1918 as part of the wholesale removal of German placenames in South Australia. The original name was restored in 1975.

In either 1868 or 1869, 56 German settlers left Ebenezer in 14 covered wagons and two spring carts to settle in the town of Walla Walla in the Riverina area of New South Wales.

Ebenezer originally started in 1851 a private sub-division in the cadastral unit of the Hundred of Belvidere. Boundaries were created for the “long established name” in 2000.
