= Moculta, South Australia =

Moculta
- Suburb
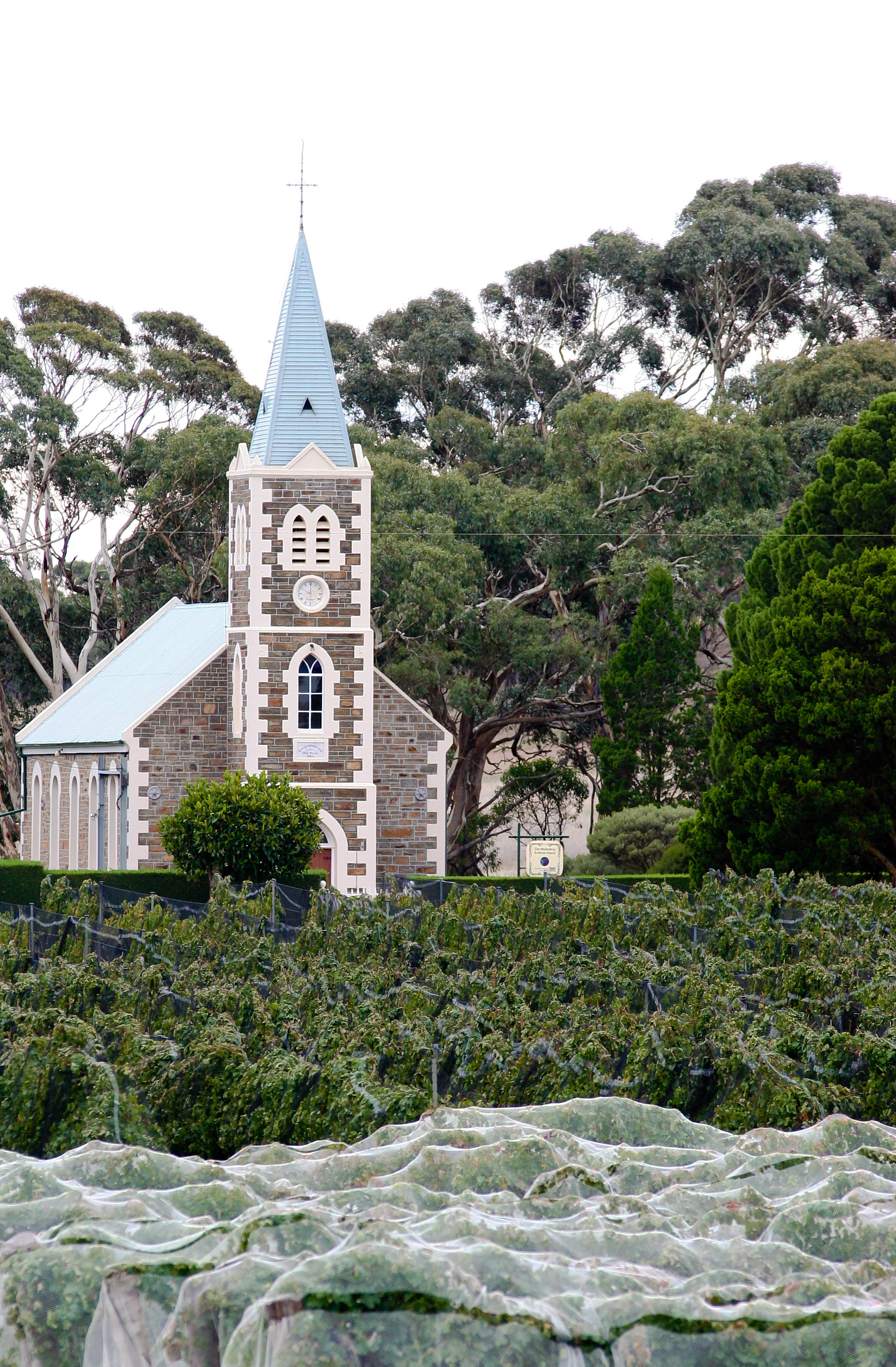
- Gnadenberg Church and the Hill of Grace wineyard

- Coordinates: 34°28′12″S 139°07′02″E
- Country: Australia
- State: South Australia
- LGA: Barossa Council
- Location: 69 km (43 mi) NE of Adelaide; 12 km (7.5 mi) NE of Angaston
- Established: 1842 (sub-division); 15 May 2003

Government
  - State electorate: Schubert
  - Federal division: Barker

Population
  - Total: 228 (SAL 2021)
- Time zone: UTC+9:30 (ACST)
  - Summer (DST): UTC+10:30 (ACST)
- Postcode: 5353
- County: Light
- Mean max temp: 21.6 °C (70.9 °F)
- Mean min temp: 9.2 °C (48.6 °F)
- Annual rainfall: 481.4 mm (18.95 in)
Suburbs around Moculta
Truro	Truro	Truro
Stockwell; Penrice	Moculta	Truro; Keyneton
Angaston	Angaston; Keyneton	Keyneton
- Location; Adjoining localities

Moculta is a locality in the Australian state of South Australia located about 69 kilometres (43 mi) north-east of the state capital of Adelaide and about 12 kilometres (7.5 mi) north-east of the municipal seat of Angaston. At the 2016 census, Moculta shared a population of 227 with part of Truro).

The earliest settlers in the area were English, Scottish and Irish migrants, among them the brothers Abraham and David Shannon. German migrants also came to the area from 1853. They built both the Grünberg (German: [ˈɡʁyːnˌbɛʁk]; 1859) and Gnadenberg ([ˈɡnaːdn̩ˌbɛʁk]) Lutheran churches. The township of Moculta itself was surveyed in 1865 and occupied soon after.

The locality of Grünberg was renamed to Karalta as a consequence of the move to rename "names of enemy origin" during World War I, but has reverted to the Anglicised Gruenberg since then. It is now included in Moculta and Penrice Gnadenberg is also now included in Moculta.

English and Barossa are spoken here

== Gallery ==
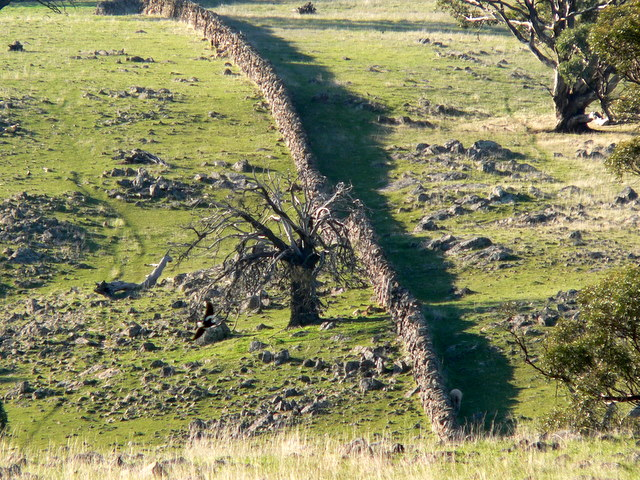
A dry stone wall at Mt Karinya near Moculta, South Australia.

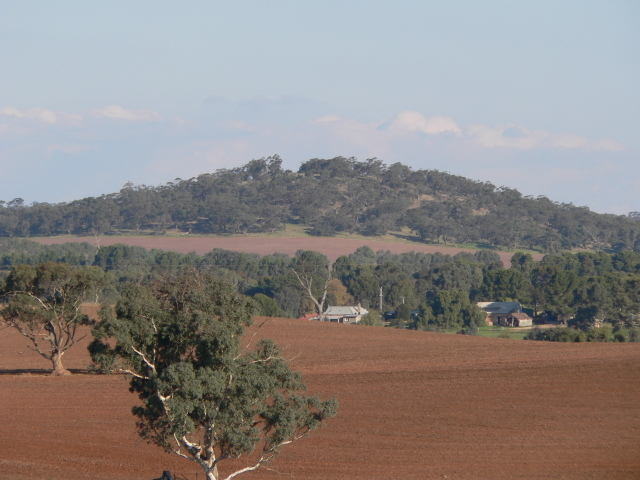
A dry stone wall at Mt Karinya near Moculta.

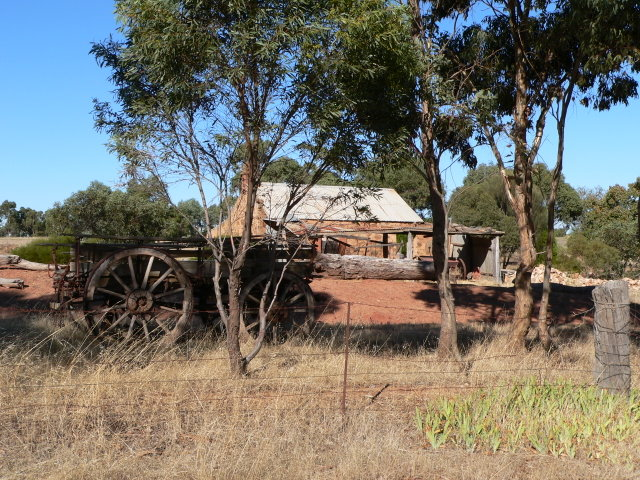
The restored cottage of the Rosenzweig's at Moculta, built circa 1859 with farm equipment in the foreground.

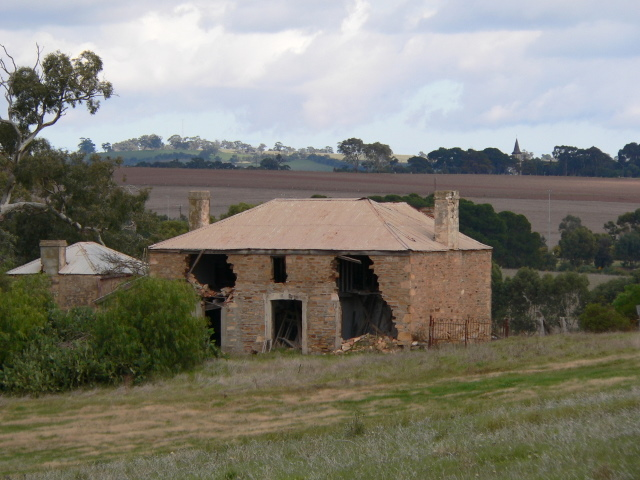
The ruins of the Shannon family's farmhouse at Moculta in 2006. The steeple of the Gruenberg Lutheran church can be seen in the background.

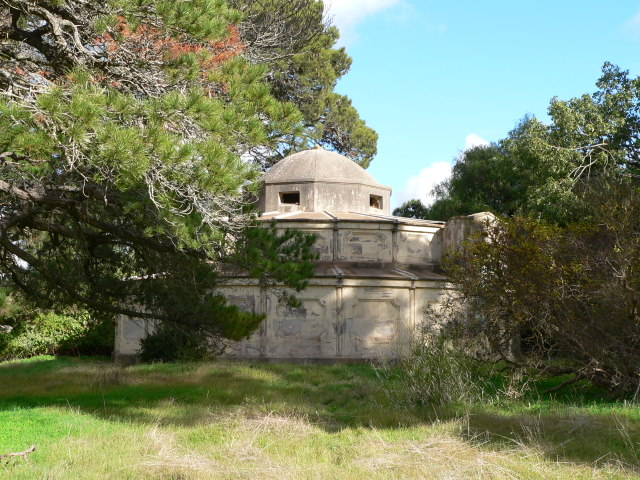
The Shannon family mausoleum outside of Moculta.

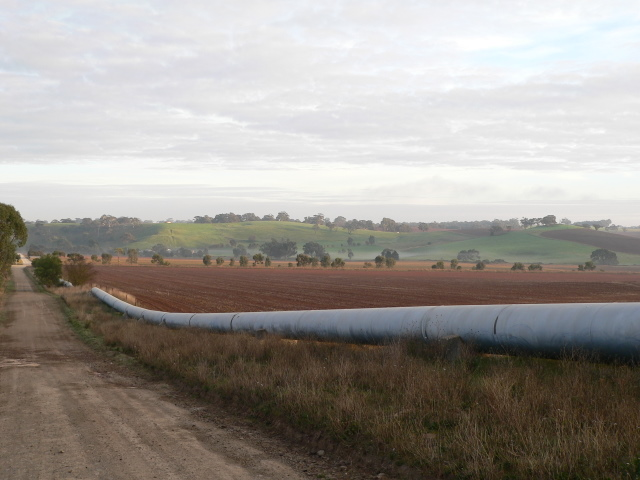
The Swan Reach to Stockwell Pipeline at Moculta.
