= Stockwell, South Australia =

Stockwell
- Town
- Coordinates: 34.4340°S 139.0538°E
- Country: Australia
- State: South Australia
- LGAs: Barossa Council; Light Regional Council

Government
  - State electorate: Schubert
  - Federal division: Barker

Population
  - Total: 516 (SAL 2021)
Localities around Stockwell
Ebenezer		Truro
	Stockwell
Light Pass, Nuriootpa	Penrice, Angaston	Moculta

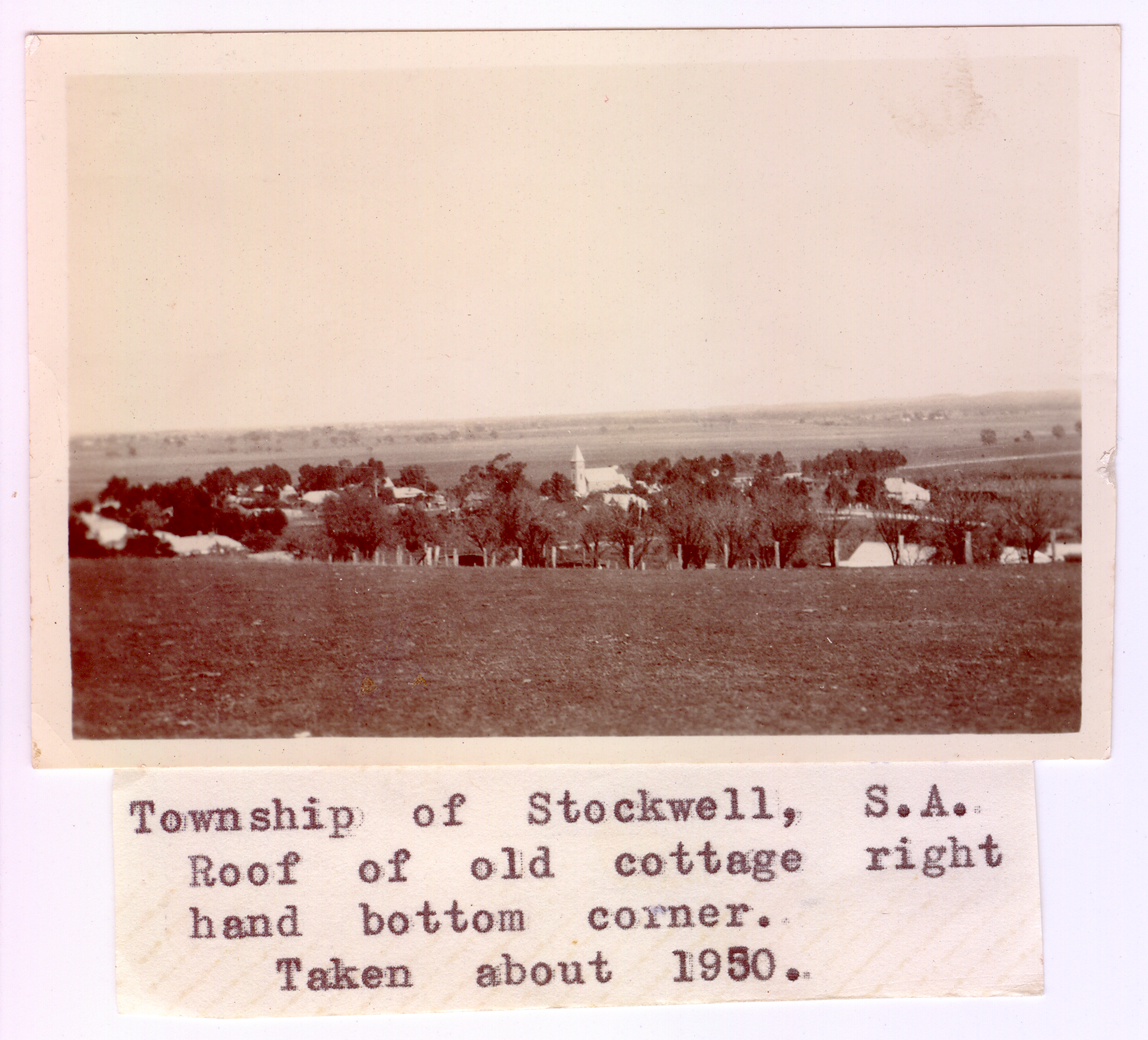
Stockwell, c.1950

Stockwell is a settlement in South Australia. At the 2006 census, Stockwell had a population of 534. Stockwell is named after Samuel Stockwell, an early landowner in the area. Stockwell was a station on the Truro railway line from 1917 to 1968 when the line closed to regular service, and closed completely in 1992.
