= Truro railway station, South Australia =

Former railway station in South Australia, Australia

Truro
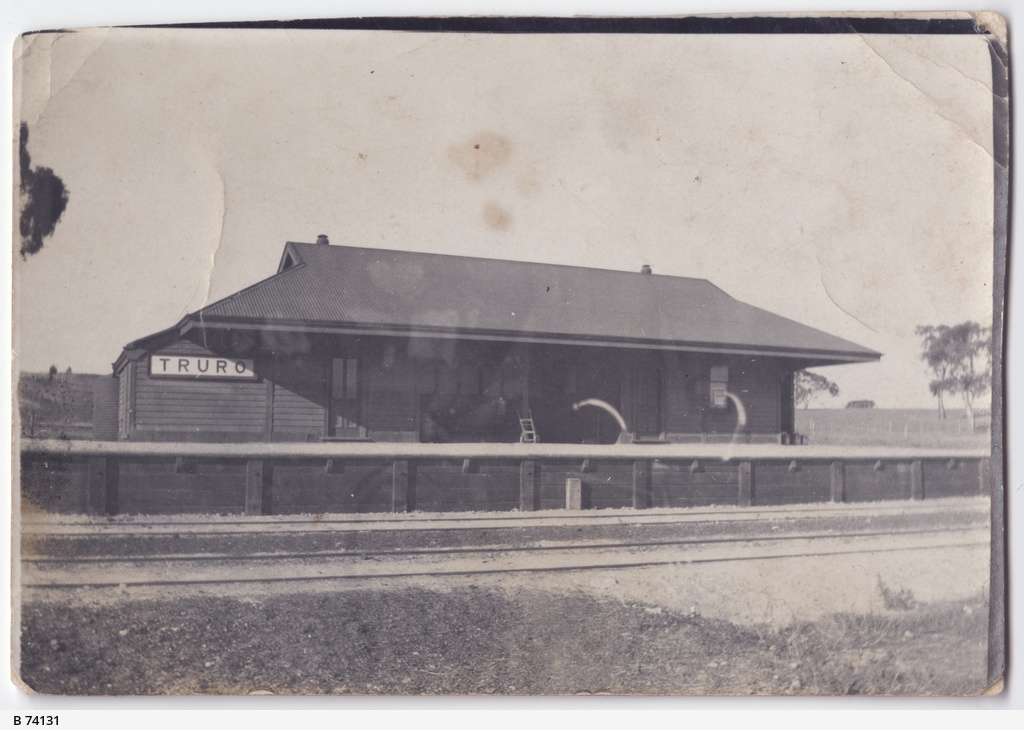
- Truro Railway Station, ( circa 1930 )

General information
- Location: Railway Terrace, Truro, South Australia
- Coordinates: 34.407817703089634°S 139.1278095051764°E
- Operator: Australian National
- Line: Truro line
- Distance: 94.9 kilometres from Adelaide
- Platforms: 1
- Tracks: 1

Construction
- Structure type: Ground

Other information
- Status: Closed & Demolished

History
- Opened: 24 September 1917
- Closed: December 1968

Services
| Preceding station | Australian National Railways Commission | Following station |
|---|---|---|
| Stockwell towards Adelaide | Truro railway line | Terminus |
Location

Truro railway station was the terminus of the Truro railway line. It served the town of Truro, South Australia.

== History ==
Truro station opened on 24 September 1917 with the opening of the branch line from Nuriootpa. Before the railway even reached Truro, public discussions proposed continuing the line further to Dutton, Steinfeld and Sedan. More proposals included the extension of the line to the Murray River at Blanchetown. The proposal was rejected in 1923. The station at Truro was named after the City of Truro in Cornwall, England. The station facilities at Truro consisted of a yard, goods shed, livestock sidings and a turntable for locomotives. A turntable for a Saurer railcar was also added from 1923. By 1966, the station facilities consisted of a cattle race, station building, end loading sheep race, heavy portable ramp for unloading / loading calves, pigs or sheep between sheep yards & road vehicles, a goods platform with ramp and a manually operated locomotive turntable.

The station closed to regular passengers in December 1968 & the station became unattended for train workings. The station master was also replaced by a station agent, which was later withdrawn in January 1973. Train services were suspended by 1980 and the line between Stockwell & Truro closed on 13 January 1987. The station still survived into the late 1980s after the tracks were lifted and the turntable was moved to the railway museum in Milang, although the station building fell into disrepair and was demolished.
