= Mount Karinya (South Australia) =

Mountain in Australia

Coordinates: 34°28′42″S 139°10′15″E

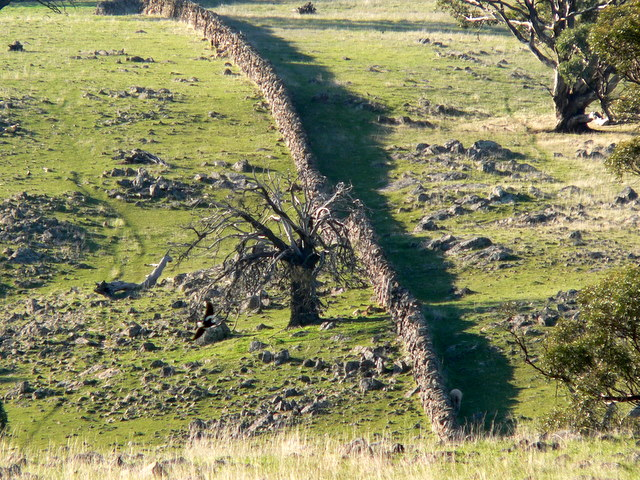
A dry stone wall at Mt. Karinya. near Moculta, South Australia

Mount Karinya is a mountain in South Australia near the town of Moculta. It has an elevation of 451 metres. The mount was known as Mount Despond until its name was changed on 10 April 1941.
