= Light Pass, South Australia =

Light Pass South Australia
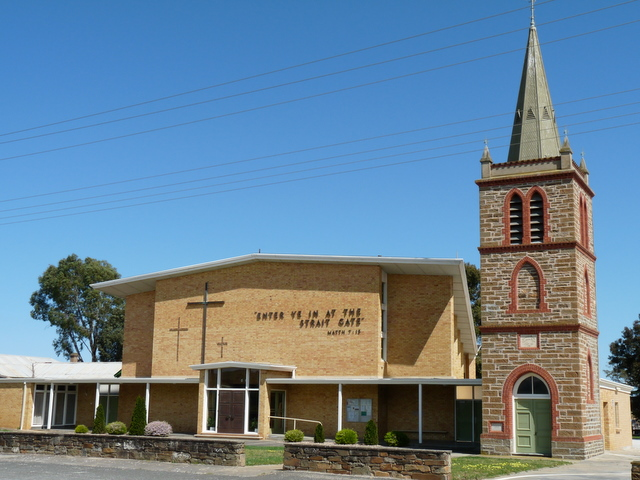
- Strait Gate Lutheran Church

- Coordinates: 34.4716°S 139.0229°E
- Population: 256 (SAL 2021)
- Postcode(s): 5355
- Location: 3 km (2 mi) E of Nuriootpa
- LGA(s): Barossa Council
- State electorate(s): Schubert
- Federal division(s): Barker
Localities around Light Pass:
	Stockwell
Nuriootpa	Light Pass	Penrice
Tanunda		Angaston

Light Pass is a settlement in the Barossa Valley region of South Australia. It was named by Charles Flaxman in honour of William Light. Light Pass is the site of two Lutheran churches and a public primary school.

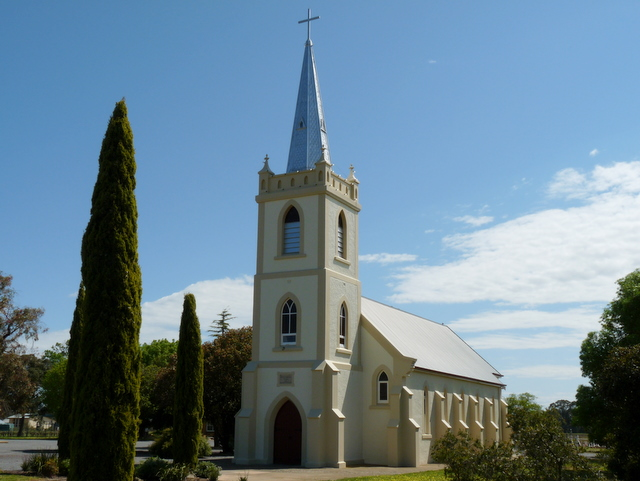
Immanual Lutheran Church

Light Pass was previously served by the Light Pass railway station on the Barossa Valley railway line, previously known as the Minkie station, derived from an Aboriginal word for daylight. The station was near the intersection of Penrice and Light Pass Roads, slightly south of the town.

== See also ==
- List of cities and towns in South Australia
