= Barossa Wine Train =

Former tourist railway in South Australia

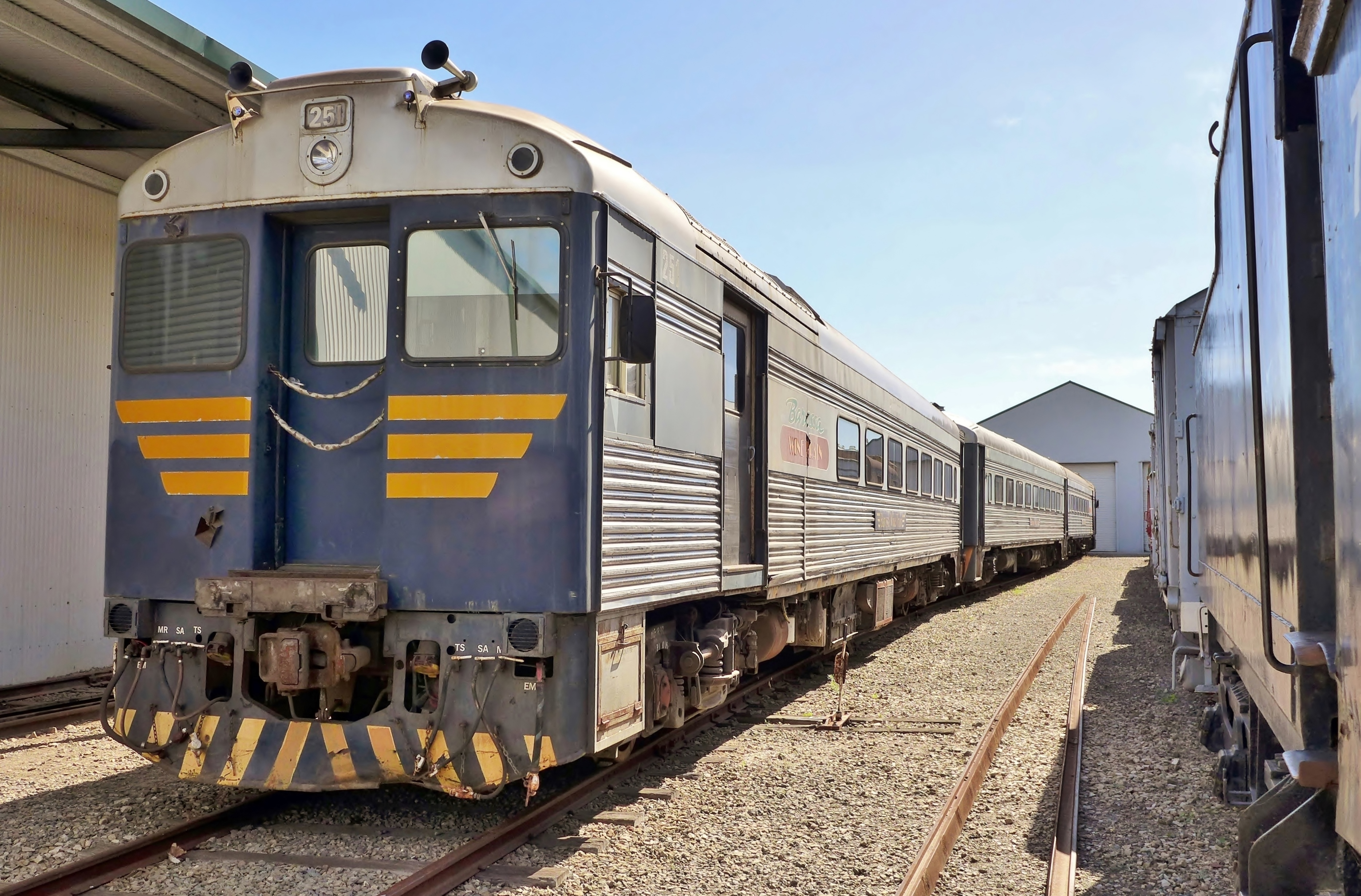
- The Wine Train at the National Railway Museum, Port Adelaide (April 2014)

Overview
- Service type: Heritage railway
- Status: Ceased
- Locale: Barossa Valley, South Australia
- First service: 1998
- Last service: 2003

Route
- Line(s) used: Barossa Valley line

Technical
- Rolling stock: Three South Australian Railways Bluebird railcar
- Track gauge: 5 ft 3 in (1,600 mm)

The Barossa Wine Train was a tourist railway in the Australian state of South Australia which, from 1998 to 2003, operated with ex - South Australian Railways Bluebird railcars on the Barossa Valley railway line which had been closed to passengers since 1968.

== Background ==
Due to financial and insurance fallout from the 9/11 disaster, it was forced to cease operations in April 2003. The train was then put under storage at the National Railway Museum in Port Adelaide under the ownership of John Geber of Château Tanunda.

In March 2015, it was revealed that a consortium were seeking to resurrect the train and had an option to purchase three Bluebird railcars.

In 2023, the Barossa Wine Train Bluebirds were sold to Aurizon but the interiors were kept for future hope to put them into Adelaide Metro's 3000 class railcars for a new Barossa Wine Train.
