= Penrice (surname) =

Penrice is a surname, and may refer to:

- Gary Penrice, English footballer
- James Penrice, Scottish footballer
- Major John Penrice, author of a glossary of the Quran (1873)
