= Penrice, South Australia =

Penrice
- Town
- Coordinates: 34°29′S 139°2′E
- Country: Australia
- State: South Australia
- LGA: Barossa Council
- Location: 2 km (1.2 mi) north of Angaston

Government
  - State electorate: Schubert
  - Federal division: Barker

Population
  - Total: 486 (SAL 2021)
- Postcode: 5353
Localities around Penrice
	Stockwell
Light Pass, Nuriootpa	Penrice	Moculta
	Angaston

Penrice is a small town in the Barossa Valley of South Australia, just north of Angaston.

Penrice is the site of a large limestone and marble quarry which was operated by Penrice Soda Products until that company failed. The quarry was bought by Adbri as a going concern in July 2014. Penrice quarry Penrice Stone Train was the last customer of the Barossa Valley railway line, but the railway has not been used since Adelaide Brighton bought the quarry.

Penrice was named by Captain Richard Rodda most likely after Penrice, an estate near St Austell, Cornwall. Some sources suggest the village was named after a town in Glamorganshire, Wales

Penrice is in the Barossa Council local government area, the state electoral district of Schubert and the federal Division of Barker.
