= Penrice Stone Train =

Former freight train service in Australia

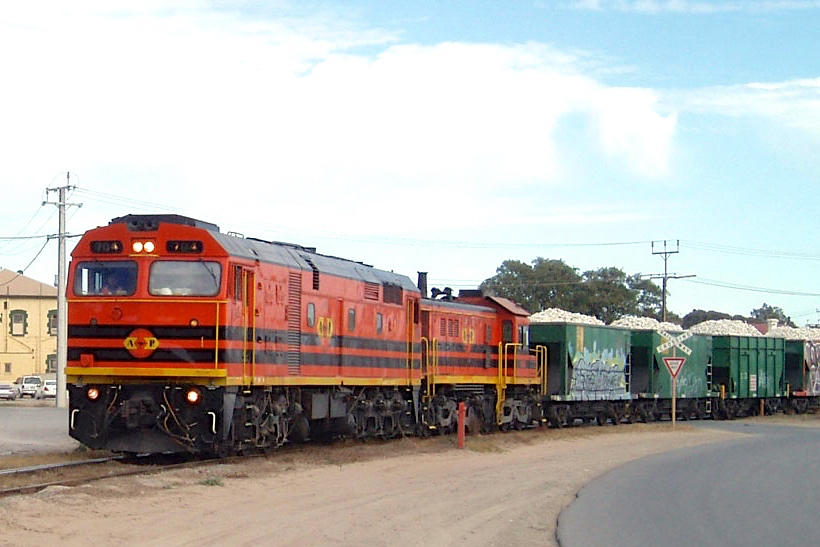
- ARG's 704 & 904 pass Birkenhead, South Australia with loaded limestone hoppers from Penrice quarry to Osborne, S.A.

Overview
- Service type: Limestone train
- Status: Ceased
- First service: November 1950
- Last service: June 2014
- Former operators: South Australian Railways, Australian National Railways Commission, Genesee & Wyoming Australia

Route
- Lines used: Barossa Valley railway line, Gawler line, Dry Creek-Port Adelaide railway line

The Penrice Stone Train “The Stonie” was a limestone train in South Australia that operated from the Penrice Quarry near Angaston on the Barossa Valley line to Penrice Soda Products' soda ash factory in Osborne in Adelaide's north-western suburbs, and the co-located Readymix concrete batching plant.

== History ==
The train commenced operating in November 1950, initially being operated by the South Australian Railways, and later by Australian National and Genesee & Wyoming Australia. It was notable as the last broad gauge freight service in South Australia. It ceased operating abruptly in June 2014 when Penrice Soda Products went into receivership and the Osborne factory closed.

The train was always AHSF hoppers, in the earlier years it would have a guard/brake van on the rear.

The final train into Osborne was 1152S from Penrice to Osborne, hauled by 843/841/844 on 20/6/2014

The last ever run was 1152S on 24/6/2014, this was a half loaded “stone” with 843/841/844 which terminated at Dry Creek, with the train crew notified of immediate effect that Penrice Soda Products had closed.

SAR, AN, ASR & G&W would allocated a locomotive to Penrice Soda Products at Osborne for shunting, before 2010 517 would be used, after which it was 831.

In its final ten or so years, the train was hauled solely by 700 and 830 class locomotives, (831, 841, 843, 844 & 704 ready to be used). It had previously been hauled by the Rx, 500, 700, 750, 900, 930, GM, CK and BL classes.
