= Barossa Valley railway line =

Closed railway line in South Australia

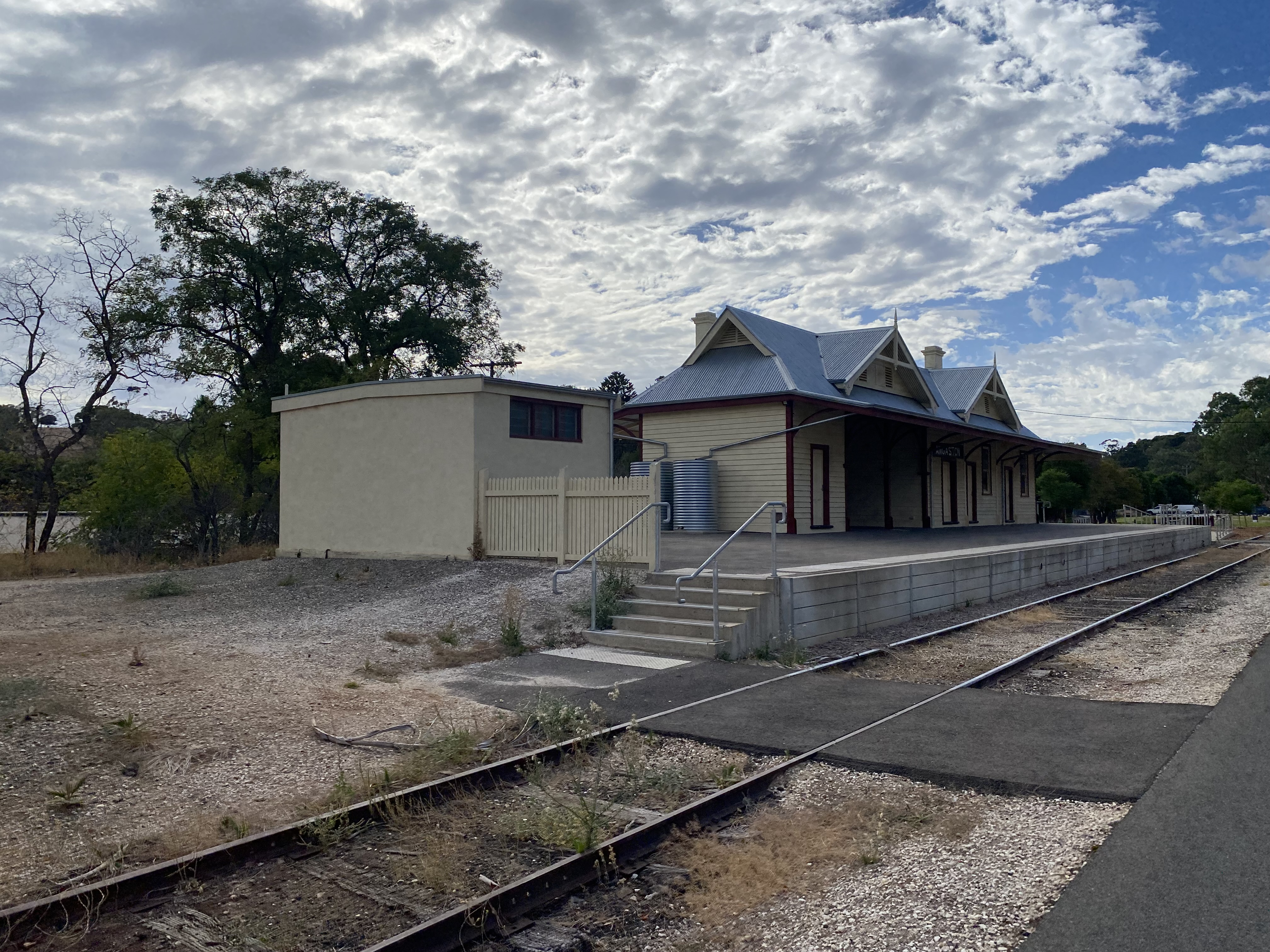
- Angaston, the original terminus of the line ( March 2024)

Overview
- Status: Disused
- Owner: Aurizon
- Locale: Barossa Valley
- Termini: Gawler; Angaston, Truro, Penrice
- Continues from: Gawler line

History
- Opened: 8 September 1911
- Closed: 25 June 2014

Technical
- Line length: 44.2 km (27.5 mi)
- Number of tracks: single track
- Track gauge: 5 ft 3 in (1,600 mm)

The Barossa Valley railway line is a closed railway line in South Australia. It was first opened in 1911, extending from the Gawler line to Angaston with later branches being built to Penrice and Truro. Much of the line from Gawler to Penrice remained open up until June 2014 (passenger services had ceased much earlier in December 1968). The section of line from Nuriootpa to Truro was removed in the 1990s. The section of line from Nuriootpa to Angaston was taken up in 2010 and replaced with a rail trail.

== History ==
The Angaston line opened from Gawler through Nuriootpa to Angaston in 1911.

The line from Nuriootpa to Truro opened on 24 September 1917. Before it had been built, there was public discussion about it continuing to Dutton, Steinfeld and Sedan. The Truro line had also at various times been proposed to be extended to the Murray River at Blanchetown, but this was rejected in 1923.

By November 1950, a branch line from Light Pass on the Truro line to Penrice Quarry was built. The Truro line closed to passengers on 16 December 1968. Some freight trains and special tours by the Australian Railway Historical Society (ARHS) used the line to Truro until 1979 when Australian National declared the line unsafe. In the late 1970s the Truro line became the branch line and the Penrice line the mainline. The last ARHS special to operate past Penrice Junction was on 20 September 1981, when Rx 207 worked to Stockwell.

From 1987, the line beyond Stockwell was used to store surplus rolling stock. It was later removed and the track between there and Truro lifted. Remaining rollingstock between Penrice Junction and Stockwell was cleared during February 1990; with that section of line also being closed and later taken up. The line past Penrice junction was officially declared closed during 1992. Some relics of the line remain today. In 2010, the track between Angaston and Nuriootpa was lifted and a shared bike and pedestrian path was put in place.

Bulk cement was transported by rail from the Adbri works adjacent to the railway line east of Stockwell Road on the western side of Angaston until the mid-1990s.

Since the cessation of the Penrice Stone Train to Penrice Quarry in June 2014, the line has been booked out of use.

== Services ==
Passenger services operated on the line from its opening. Regular passenger services were withdrawn in December 1968. From November 1996, the adelaide suburban rail operator TransAdelaide introduced a trial Sundays only service to Nuriootpa. In May 1998, Bluebird Rail Operations, a business of C.O.C. Limited, commenced operating the Barossa Wine Train from Adelaide to Tanunda with three refurbished Bluebirds (102, 251 and 252). These services ceased by April 2003 with the last passenger train on the line being a National Railway Museum Angaston charter on 7 November 2004.

== Stations ==
There were a total of 11 stopping places on the line between Gawler and Angaston.

- North Gawler (now Gawler Central railway station)
- Pelberre
- Kalbeeba
- Kalperri
- Sandy Creek
- Warpoo
- Wilamba
- Lyndoch
- Rowlands Flat
- Tanunda
- Nuriootpa
- Angaston

On the Truro branch:

- Stockwell (4 miles (6.4 km) from Nuriootpa)
- Truro (9.5 miles (15.3 km) from Nuriootpa)

== Current Status ==
The remaining line between Gawler and Penrice remains but lays dormant and is not currently listed as being in use. About 120 metres of track at an intersection between Tanunda and Nuriootpa has been severed and replaced with a roundabout for vehicles. There have been constant proposals and calls for the line to be reopened for either passenger or tourist purposes but no plan has yet been acted upon.
