= Nuriootpa, South Australia =

Nuriootpa
- Town
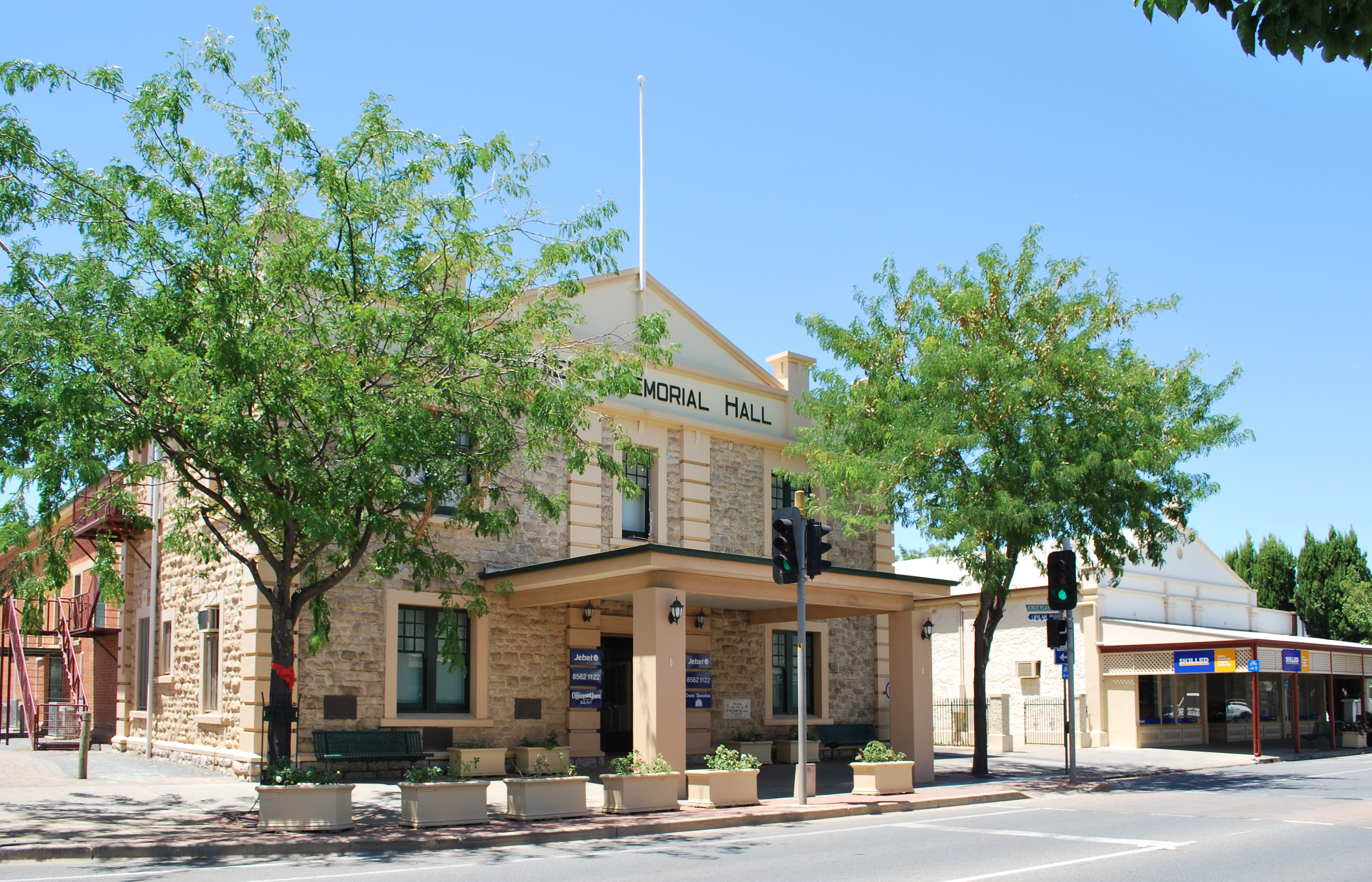
- Memorial hall

- Coordinates: 34°28′0″S 138°59′0″E
- Country: Australia
- State: South Australia
- LGA: Barossa Council, Light Regional Council
- Location: 74 km (46 mi) North East of Adelaide via
- Established: 1854

Government
  - State electorate: Schubert
  - Federal division: Barker

Population
  - Total: 6,204 (UCL 2021)
- Postcode: 5355
- Mean max temp: 21.6 °C (70.9 °F)
- Mean min temp: 9.2 °C (48.6 °F)
- Annual rainfall: 467.5 mm (18.41 in)
Localities around Nuriootpa
Moppa	Koonunga	Ebenezer, Stockwell
Greenock	Nuriootpa	Light Pass, Penrice
Marananga, Seppeltsfield	Stone Well, Tanunda, Vine Vale	Angaston

Nuriootpa (/ˌnjʊəriˈʊtpə/ NURE-ee-UUT-pə) is a town in South Australia and the major commercial centre of the Barossa Valley, about an hour's drive north of the state capital, Adelaide. The name of the town is reputed to be the local Aboriginal word for "meeting place".

Nuriootpa is situated at the north end of the Barossa Valley, near the Sturt Highway. It has a population of over 6,500 people, making it the largest town in the area. There are vineyards surrounding the town. It is home to wineries including Penfolds, Elderton Wines and Wolf Blass.

== History ==
The first recorded Europeans to visit the area, on 3 March 1838, were the exploration party of John Hill, John Oakden, William Wood, and Charles Willis, en route to the Murray River from Adelaide.

Since the 1930s, Nuriootpa has been cited as an example of inspired community development. The town's community owned and operated retail businesses have funded public facilities, including the Senior Citizens' Club, the swimming pool, the kindergarten and recreation areas. The short-lived progressive Adelaide movement, the Common Cause Movement, arranged a visit by future Prime Minister Ben Chifley to Nuriootpa in 1944 which led him, inspired by its approach, to promote the town as a model for community co-operation. The Adelaide architect Louis Laybourne-Smith prepared a plan for the town's recreation and education area, known as its 'War Memorial Community Centre' at that time. Much of this plan has been realised, including Laybourne-Smith's unusual 'fan-shaped' Olympic-sized pool.

The 1950 Australian Grand Prix, which was Australia's premier motor race of that year, was held in January 1950 using the Nuriootpa Road Circuit, a temporary course utilising roads in and around the town of Nuriootpa. The race was won by Doug Whiteford driving a Ford V8 Special. The first race meeting to use the circuit had been held in April 1949.

In March 1977 Queen Elizabeth II visited the town as part of an extended tour marking her Silver Jubilee.

The first stage of the 2014 Tour Down Under was held in Nuriootpa in January 2014, starting from the town and finishing in Angaston. The 135 km stage was won by Simon Gerrans of Orica–GreenEDGE.

== Governance ==
Nuriootpa's local government is the Barossa Council. The northern outskirts are in the Light Regional Council.

It is in the state electorate of Schubert, and Light for the outskirts.

Nuriootpa is in the federal Electorate of Barker.

== Facilities ==
Nuriootpa High School (NHS), established in 1935, is a state high school catering for students in years 7 to 12. As of 2023 more than 1300 students are enrolled at the school. Its motto is "PER ASPERA AD ASTRA - Through Adversity to the Stars".

The town's Catholic Church is dedicated to Our Lady of the Valley.

== Media ==
The main local newspaper covering the town is The Leader, published in Angaston.

Nuriootpa was home to the short-lived Nuriootpa and District Community Diary (November 1955 – November 1956), a monthly magazine subtitled ": monthly news bulletin of the Nuriootpa War Memorial Community Centre Inc".

== Climate ==
Nuriootpa has a hot-summer mediterranean climate (Köppen: Csa), with very warm, dry summers and cool, relatively wet winters. Average maxima range from 30.2 °C (86.4 °F) in January to 13.6 °C (56.5 °F) in July. Mean average annual rainfall is 474.8 mm (18.69 in), with a winter maximum. There are 65.9 clear days and 144.2 cloudy days annually. Extreme temperatures have ranged from −5.4 °C (22.3 °F) on 17 June 1959 to 46.0 °C (114.8 °F) on 24 January 2019.

Climate data for Nuriootpa (34º28'48"S, 139º00'36"E, 275 m AMSL) (1996-2024 normals, extremes 1957-1999)
Month	Jan	Feb	Mar	Apr	May	Jun	Jul	Aug	Sep	Oct	Nov	Dec	Year
Record high °C (°F)	46.0 (114.8)	43.9 (111.0)	41.3 (106.3)	37.6 (99.7)	29.0 (84.2)	25.3 (77.5)	25.5 (77.9)	28.0 (82.4)	31.9 (89.4)	36.8 (98.2)	42.1 (107.8)	44.7 (112.5)	46.0 (114.8)
Mean daily maximum °C (°F)	30.2 (86.4)	29.4 (84.9)	26.1 (79.0)	22.0 (71.6)	17.4 (63.3)	14.1 (57.4)	13.6 (56.5)	14.7 (58.5)	17.9 (64.2)	21.4 (70.5)	25.1 (77.2)	27.5 (81.5)	21.6 (70.9)
Mean daily minimum °C (°F)	14.7 (58.5)	14.4 (57.9)	12.1 (53.8)	9.1 (48.4)	6.8 (44.2)	5.2 (41.4)	4.6 (40.3)	5.0 (41.0)	6.6 (43.9)	8.3 (46.9)	10.7 (51.3)	12.4 (54.3)	9.2 (48.6)
Record low °C (°F)	2.2 (36.0)	3.7 (38.7)	0.8 (33.4)	−0.6 (30.9)	−3.0 (26.6)	−5.4 (22.3)	−4.7 (23.5)	−3.0 (26.6)	−2.1 (28.2)	−1.0 (30.2)	−1.0 (30.2)	1.1 (34.0)	−5.4 (22.3)
Average precipitation mm (inches)	16.5 (0.65)	22.8 (0.90)	24.1 (0.95)	33.0 (1.30)	47.8 (1.88)	55.3 (2.18)	57.0 (2.24)	57.8 (2.28)	56.9 (2.24)	37.7 (1.48)	35.8 (1.41)	30.2 (1.19)	474.8 (18.69)
Average precipitation days (≥ 0.2 mm)	4.4	3.9	5.4	7.6	13.5	17.0	18.0	16.7	14.3	10.2	8.1	6.8	125.9
Average afternoon relative humidity (%)	28	30	34	41	54	63	63	58	53	41	34	32	44
Average dew point °C (°F)	5.4 (41.7)	6.6 (43.9)	5.6 (42.1)	5.5 (41.9)	6.0 (42.8)	5.7 (42.3)	5.2 (41.4)	4.8 (40.6)	5.3 (41.5)	3.6 (38.5)	4.0 (39.2)	4.9 (40.8)	5.2 (41.4)
Mean monthly sunshine hours	328.6	282.5	269.7	225.0	176.7	147.0	158.1	201.5	216.0	269.7	288.0	306.9	2,869.7
Percentage possible sunshine	75	75	71	67	55	50	50	60	61	67	69	69	64
Source: Bureau of Meteorology (1996-2024 normals, extremes 1957-1999)

== See also ==
- Barossa Valley (wine)
