= Angaston, South Australia =

Angaston
- Town
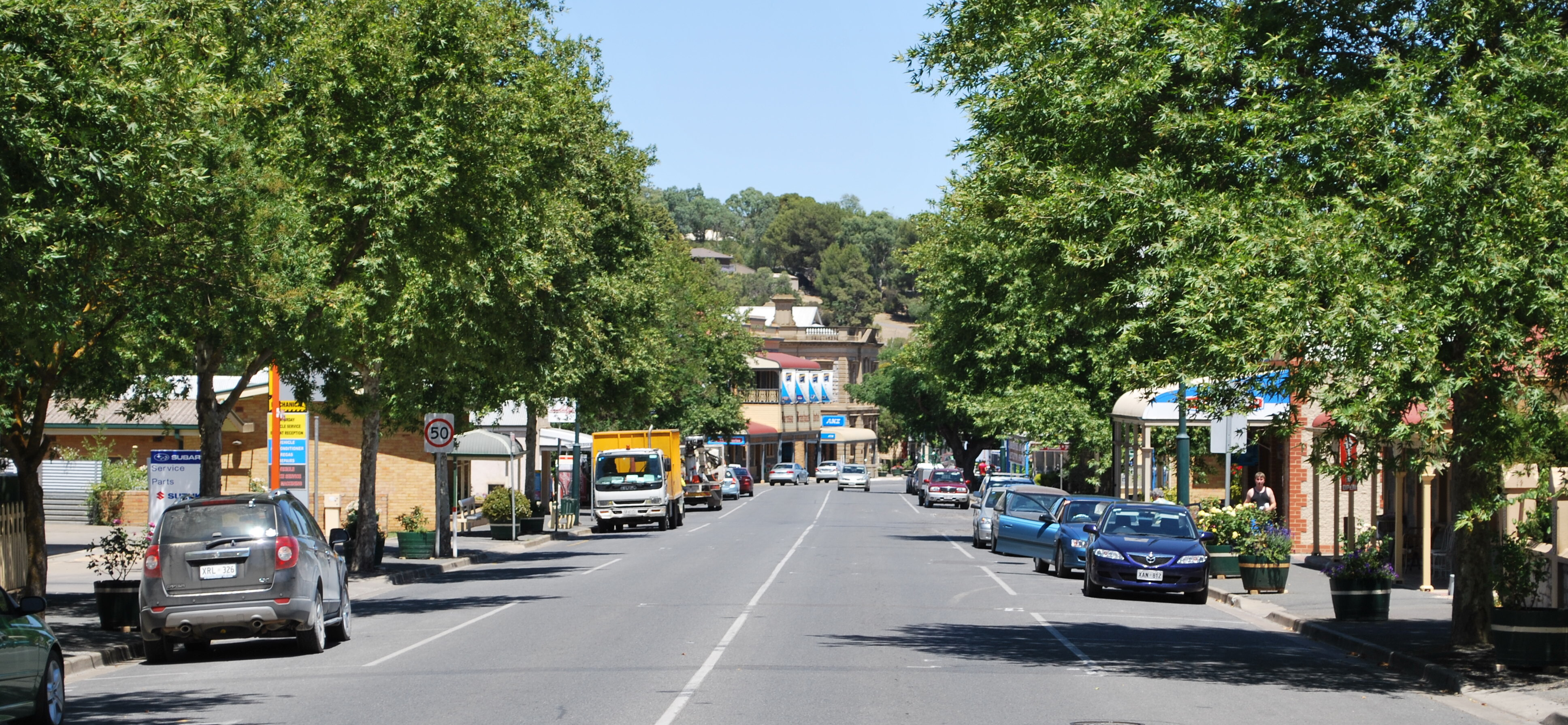
- Murray St, the main street of Angaston

- Coordinates: 34°30′S 139°03′E
- Country: Australia
- State: South Australia
- LGA: Barossa Council
- Location: 77 km (48 mi) north-east of Adelaide via
- Established: 1842

Government
  - State electorate: Schubert
  - Federal division: Barker
- Elevation: 347 m (1,138 ft)

Population
  - Total: 2,202 (2021 census)
- Postcode: 5353
Localities around Angaston
Light Pass	Penrice, Stockwell	Moculta, Truro
Nuriootpa	Angaston	Keyneton
Bethany, Vine Vale, Tanunda	Flaxman Valley	Mount McKenzie, Eden Valley

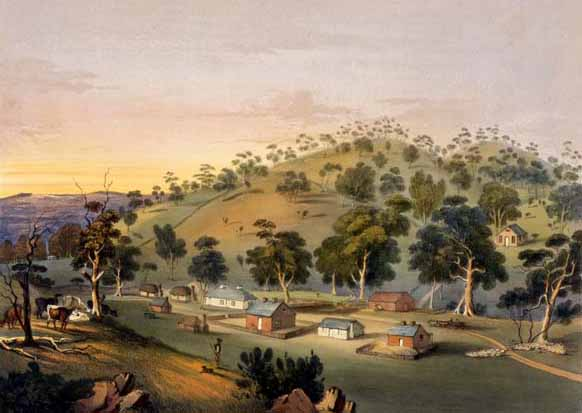
Angaston painted by George French Angas in the 1840s

Angaston is a town on the eastern side of the Barossa Valley in South Australia, 77 km northeast of Adelaide. Its elevation is 347 m, one of the highest points in the valley, and has an average rainfall of 561 mm. Angaston was originally known as German Pass, but was later renamed after the politician, banker and pastoralist George Fife Angas, who settled in the area in the 1850s. Angaston is in the Barossa Council local government area, the state electoral district of Schubert and the federal Division of Barker.

== Railway ==
Angaston was the terminus of the Barossa Valley railway line which was built in 1911. Regular passenger trains ended in 1968 and the line from Nuriootpa to Angaston was replaced by a walking trail.

== Notable former residents ==
- George Fife Angas (1789–1879) politician, banker and emancipist
- Sir John Keith Angas (1900–1977) pastoralist
- Hugh Thomas Moffitt Angwin (1888–1949) engineer and public servant
- William Hague (1864–1924) storekeeper and politician
- Brian Hurn (1939–2015), cricketer.
- Shannon Hurn (1987-), AFL footballer, West Coast Eagles 2018 Premiership Captain, 2 X All Australian, AFLPA Best Captain 2019, West Coast Eagles games record holder.
- O. P. Heggie (1877–1936) Actor. Played the Hermit who befriends the Monster in Bride of Frankenstein (1935)

== Wineries ==
- Yalumba
- Saltram Winery
- Lambert Estate

== Other places ==
- The Old Union Chapel
- Collingrove Homestead
- Pioneer Park in Murray Street
- Memorial Reserve

== Tour Down Under ==
=== 2014 ===
The finish of the 135 kilometres (84 mi) first stage of the 2014 Tour Down Under occurred on 21 January 2014 within the town. The race started in Nuriootpa and was won by Simon Gerrans of Orica–GreenEDGE.
