= Alexandra and Eastern Hills Cricket Association =

Australian cricket association

The Alexandra and Eastern Hills Cricket Association (A&EHCA) is a cricket association in the Adelaide Hills and Fleurieu and Kangaroo Island regions of South Australia. It is an affiliated association of the South Australian Cricket Association. The A&EHCA runs senior men's cricket competitions across five grades (A Grade, A2 Grade, B Grade, C Grade and D Grade) and junior competitions at the under 16, under 14, under 12 and under 10 age groups.

== History ==
=== Alexandra Cricket Association (1908-1983) ===
The earliest recorded match in the Strathalbyn district was played between Strathalbyn and Macclesfield in April 1859. Several more clubs appeared in the 1860s and 1870s, and for a long time each one organised its own matches against neighbouring towns. Most towns did not have a proper cricket pitch until about 1895-1905 when slate pitches began to be laid. Presumably, until that time just a level piece of ground had to serve the purpose.

Although the concept of an association had been raised from time to time, it was not until 1908 that one eventuated. It was called the Alexandra Cricket Association (ACA), presumably named after Queen Alexandra, the wife of King Edward VII who was monarch at that time. The original member clubs were based in Strathalbyn, Ashbourne, Milang, and Langhorne Creek. The association lapsed after just one year. It re-formed in 1910/1911 without Milang and Langhorne Creek, but with the addition of Meadows. In 1913/1914 the association lapsed again and was not revived until 1920 when Milang re-joined and Woodchester and Callington entered for the first time. The association lapsed yet again for the 1924/1925 and 1925/1926 seasons. Ashbourne, evidently exasperated with the stop-start nature of the competition, departed in 1925/1926 to join the Great Southern Cricket Association and stayed there for the next five years. Although the ACA re-formed again in 1926/1927 it was now without its trump card, Ashbourne, which had won every premiership except the first. Strathalbyn split into two teams (East and West) and Callington joined up again (but for one year only). Throughout this period, association matches were not scheduled for every Saturday of the season, and clubs were free to organise their own non-association matches on a regular basis. Some clubs continued to play whole seasons of non-association cricket e.g. between 1908 and 1945 Milang was a member of the Alexandra Association for only 12 seasons and Langhorne Creek for only 8 seasons, yet these were two of the biggest towns in the district. They played plenty of cricket, but most of it was outside the association. Finniss was a late starter and did not join until 1929. Five years later they won their first of a procession of premierships, and became the new measuring-stick of the competition. In 1932 Strathalbyn withdrew to form its own Strathalbyn Cricket Association of four Strathalbyn teams (Schools, Centrals, Angas and Rovers), but this experiment lasted for only one season – the only time that Strathalbyn was not a member of the ACA. Belvidere joined up in 1934 and stayed until the intervention of World War II.

The period between 1908 and the early 1930s belonged to Ashbourne which won 11 premierships, but the next period would belong to Finniss. Between 1932 and 1952 Finniss featured in every grand final except one, winning eight in a row, both before and after the war. The continued dominance of the tiny towns of Ashbourne and Finniss over their much larger rivals Strathalbyn, Milang, and Langhorne Creek, for such a long period, is quite remarkable. Until 1953 Milang had won only one premiership (way back in 1929/1930) and Langhorne Creek had won none at all. Langhorne Creek finally broke through in 1954/1955 for its first premiership, after which Milang got three in a row, and Langhorne Creek three more in a row. Macclesfield entered the association in 1945 (and stayed for seven years), Strathalbyn High School joined in 1946 (for two years), along with Colts in 1952 (for two years). The Colts consisted of players under 20 years of age from Strathalbyn and Milang, and two senior players. None of these teams made much impression or threatened to win any premierships. Milang Colts appeared in 1958 (for four seasons), Langhorne Creek Colts in 1961 (for one year only), and Macclesfield re-entered in 1961 and stayed for 9 years. In 1961/1962 the competition split into separate A & B grades after the first round, and thereafter a B Grade competition existed in one form or another (sometimes from the start of the season, sometimes at the end of the minor round). Hartley joined in 1965 but the club disbanded just five years later. High School entered in 1970 and made a quick impression by winning two premierships in five years. Separate A and B Grades for the whole season commenced in 1978, but it appeared that the competition was stagnating – the same five clubs (Strathalbyn, Milang, Langhorne Creek, Ashbourne and Finniss) were competing every year, and there was a lack of new blood and new challenges.

It so happened that the Mt Barker and Eastern Hills Cricket Association was also stagnating and a hasty round of discussions shortly before the commencement of the 1983/1984 season resulted in a merger of the two associations into the new Alexandra and Eastern Hills Association. The 1983/1984 season commenced with ten teams in A Grade (the above-mentioned five from Alexandra plus Mount Barker, Echunga, Nairne, Wistow, and Bremer/Callington). There were a further eight teams in B Grade (Strathalbyn, Milang, Ashbourne, Langhorne Creek, Bremer/Callington, Echunga, Nairne, and Macclesfield). Finniss withdrew in 1995, and Hahndorf transferred in from the Hills Cricket Association in 1997. Finniss re-entered in B Grade in 2007/2008, by which time there were seven teams in A Grade, eleven in B Grade, and twelve in C Grade – a total of 30 senior teams.

Between 1908 and 1965 the ACA had only two presidents – James Bell (owner of the chain of Bell's Stores based in Strathalbyn) served from 1908 until his death in January 1936, and the legendary Harry Meyer (from Ashbourne) continued from 1936 to 1965 when he was 80 years of age. More recently, from 1977/1978 until 1989/1990, Keith Ness presided over the transition to the new Alexandra and Eastern Hills Cricket Association. Harry Meyer became the ACA's first Life Member in 1964, Ashbourne's Vin Payne the second in 1965, and Murray Johnson from Langhorne Creek in 1978 was the third (but perhaps through an oversight, it was not awarded until 1982). Since the merger in 1983, eight more stalwarts of the A&EHCA have been awarded Life Memberships: Keith Ness (Finniss), Trevor Calaby (Macclesfield), Perry Jones (Strathalbyn), Clive Wundersitz (Bremer/Callington), Geoff Warren (Langhorne Creek), Roger Farley (Bremer/Callington), Trevor Potts (Langhorne Creek) and Cheryl Gillies (Macclesfield).

The format of match play has varied considerably over the years. Until the 1930s, mainly one-day matches were held, with no compulsory declarations, resulting in a huge number of draws. Even when two-day-matches were introduced there was initially no compulsory declaration at the end of the first day. Most ovals had concrete wickets (with matting), but in 1937/1938 the association backed Harry Meyer's move to install a turf wicket in Strathalbyn with a view to attracting big matches. Harry organised another turf wicket on his home ground (Ashbourne) in the 1960s, the High School added one in about 1972 before Langhorne Creek followed in about 1973. Callington's was the most recent in the early 1990s.

Although several clubs have fielded two A grade teams in the same year e.g. Strathalbyn (two A Grade teams for 23 seasons), Milang (for 14 seasons), Langhorne Creek (for 7 seasons) and Finniss (for 2 seasons), on only one occasion in the history of the ACA have two teams from the same club met in a grand final. That was in 1971-1972 when Strath White met Strath Red. Although the ACA celebrated its centenary in 2008, it did not exist for 15 of those years (1909–10, 1913-14 to 1919-1920 inclusive, 1924-5, 1925-6, and 1940-1 to 1944-5 inclusive).

The handsome Alexandra Cup was presented to the A Grade premier from 1908 to 1983. Surprisingly, there appear to be three consecutive errors engraved on the cup – for 1939, 1940 and 1946. Despite the fact that Strath West, Ashbourne, and Callington appear on the Cup, it seems absolutely certain from all other records available that Finniss won all three.

The Meyer Shield inter-association competition was initiated in 1964/1965 named in honour of Harry Meyer's long and outstanding service to the association. Initially four associations (Alexandra, Hills, Mt Barker & Eastern Hills and Torrens Valley) participated, but the number grew to eight as Great Southern, Southern, Kangaroo Island, and Murray Towns were added in the years ahead. Alexandra has won this competition only three times (1973, 1976, 1977), Mt Barker and Eastern Hills five times (1966, 1967, 1969, 1972, 1974) and Alexandra and Eastern Hills only three times (1989, 1997, 2014). The Under 21 Figg Cup was also awarded from 1964/1965, followed by the Under 16 Calaby Shield from 1978/1979, and the Under 14 Fuller Shield from 1992 to 1993.

A Rotary Cup knockout one-day competition commenced in about 1975/1976 on Sundays with teams from five local clubs (Strathalbyn, Ashbourne, Langhorne Creek, Milang and Finniss). Within a few years eight more clubs from outside the ACA had all joined in. The final season of the Rotary Club competition was 1995/1996 when Nairne won the title. In recent years it has been replaced by the Courier Super Challenge knockout series involving teams from the three Adelaide Hills based associations – A&EH, Hills and Torrens Valley.

Ashbourne's Harry Meyer attended country carnivals organised by the SA Cricket Association in for over 40 years from 1909/1910 (or earlier). From about 1922 until at least 1954 he organised a team from the Fleurieu Peninsula to compete against about 7 other country districts from all over South Australia. His team was variously called Combined Southern Areas, Alexandra, and Southern (or Fleurieu since 1992), and won the competition in 1926, 1930, 1938, 1955, 1958, 1979, 1994, 1998, 2002, 2004, 2005, 2007 and 2008. The H.R. Meyer Challenge Cup, donated by Ashbourne's Harry Meyer, has been awarded to the winner from 1925 until the present day. One of the H.R. Meyer Cups is housed in the museum at Adelaide Oval (teams could retain the cup after three wins). Since the first country carnival in 1895/1896, thirteen centuries and one double century have been scored on Adelaide Oval by Alexandra players. No carnival matches have been scheduled on Adelaide Oval since 1968/1969 so it appears no more players will share that honour.

Another state-wide carnival, conducted by the Country Carnival Cricket Association, is also held in annually. Keith Ness (Finniss) took an Alexandra team to these carnivals for about 25–30 years from the early 1960s. He was said to be the oldest (68 or 69 years) and longest-serving player/manager in the competition when he retired in the late 1980s. Alexandra has won the Shield only twice – in 1980 and 1985. In the 1960s over 40 teams competed but in more recent years the number has fallen to about ten.

The Alexandra junior competition began in a small way in about 1963 when Ralph Briggs (Milang) and Harry Pitt (Strathalbyn) arranged a few scratch matches between the two towns on Saturday mornings for boys under 16 years of age. A year or so later Keith Ness added a team from Finniss. By 1965 there were teams from Ashbourne and Langhorne Creek, and a formal competition was established. Under the A&EHCA, an Under 12 competition was added in 1984, and this was revised to Under 13 in 1986. In 1998 this was separated further into separate Under 14 and Under 12 competitions. By 2007/2008 this had grown to four age groups: Under 16 (7 teams), Under 14 (11 teams), Under 12 (14 teams), and Under 10. This represents an astonishing growth since the A&EHCA was formed in 1983.

=== Mount Barker and Eastern Hills Cricket Association (1931-1983) ===
Cricket has been played in the Adelaide Hills from as far back as 1843, but most clubs probably commenced closer to 1900. The Hills Cricket Association (HCA) was formed in 1922 with four member clubs: Mount Barker, Echunga, Macclesfield, and Meadows. The former three are now members of the A&EHCA, but Meadows is not. However, Meadows had previously been a member of the Alexandra Cricket Association for three years from 1910/1911 to 1912/1913.

The Eastern Hills Cricket Association (EHCA) commenced in 1931/1932 with five member clubs: Bremer, Littlehampton, Nairne, Dawesley and Mount Barker B. Murdoch's Hill and joined a year later, but Dawesley withdrew. Watts’ Brickyard entered in 1933/1934 and disappeared. Mt Barker B withdrew in 1934/1935 to play in their own newly formed Mt Barker District Cricket Association. Callington and Harrogate joined the EHCA in 1935/1936. Although the EHCA never had more than six teams at a time, 16 different clubs have participated at one time or another. Most have joined up for a few years and then withdrawn, and only three have been regular members on a long-term basis – Bremer (Kanmantoo), Callington, and Nairne. Other occasional members have been Littlehampton (9 seasons, 5 premierships), Murdoch's Hill (14 seasons, 2 premierships), Woodside (1 season), Woodside RSL (5 seasons, 1 premiership in 1955-6), Harrogate (5 seasons), Mt Barker B (3 seasons), Watts’ Brickyards (10 seasons 1 premiership), 16th Battalion (Woodside, 3 seasons), Monarto (3 seasons), Nairne Veterans (2 seasons), 2nd Field Ambulance (2 seasons), Native Valley (1 season), Dawesley (1 season).

The J.E. Wooley Shield (named after the EHCA's first president) was presented to the EHCA premier for the 24 years of the association's existence. By far the most successful club was Bremer, with 10 premierships, including the last four (to 1959/1960).

The Mount Barker District Cricket Association (MtBDCA) was formed in 1934/1935 and consisted of three Mount Barker teams (Blues, Whites and Methodists), plus Wistow. Hahndorf (initially known as Ambleside) joined a year later to expand the association to five (5) teams. However, Methodists soon folded after the 1936/37 season and the entire association was then suspended after the 1939/40 season due to World War II. The MtBDCA resumed in 1946/47, with the foursome of Blues, Whites, Wistow and Hahndorf joined by teams from Littlehampton and Mount Barker High School only for both to fold after the 1946/47 season. They were immediately replaced by Flaxley and Echunga to ensure a six (6) team Association continued. Macclesfield joined in 1952/1953, and Onkaparinga in 1953/1954. All were still members in 1960 when the two associations merged. Three other clubs had briefly been members: Littlehampton (1939/1940 & 1946/1947), High School (1946/1947) and Mount Barker Colts (1937/1938). The Dr. R.V. Pridmore Shield was won by Mount Barker teams 14 times in the 20 years before the merger with EHCA. The Whites got eight (8) premierships and the Blues six (6), but no team was able to win more than two (2) in a row.

The Mount Barker and Eastern Hills Cricket Association (MtB&EHCA) commenced in 1960/1961 with twelve (12) teams, all in one grade. From the former MtBDCA there were Mt Barker Blues, Mt Barker Whites, Wistow, Hahndorf, Echunga, Flaxley, and Onkaparinga (but not Macclesfield) and from the former EHCA there were only Bremer, Callington, Nairne 1 and Nairne 2. Murdoch's Hill departed to play in the Torrens Valley Cricket Association, and Hartley entered as a new team. Twelve (12) teams were obviously deemed too unwieldy in one grade the following season two (2) grades were formed, with ten (10) teams in A Grade and six (6) in B Grade. There was a further shakeout in 1962/1963 after which the A Grade settled down to 6-8 teams for the next 20 years. Mt Barker Reds joined in 1965/1966 to give Mt Barker three (3) sides but by 1971/1972 only one Mt Barker team remained in A Grade. Bremer and Callington merged in 1968/1969, and Flaxley and Macclesfield in 1970/1971. Lenswood Ranges made a lightning raid in 1977/1978, having transferred from the Torrens Valley Cricket Association and won four (4) premierships in a row in their five (5) years with MtB&EHCA. However, Lenswood Ranges and Onkaparinga both departed in 1982/1983, and the association was starting to look shaky. There were two other clubs that had briefly appeared in A Grade: Biggs Flat (3 seasons from 1963/1964 to 1965/1966) and Woodside (1966/1967). In the 23 years from 1960/1961 to the final amalgamation with the Alexandra Cricket Association in 1983/1984, the honours had been shared across several clubs: Wistow (8 premierships), Onkaparinga (4), Lenswood Ranges (4), Mount Barker (only 3), Nairne (2), Flaxley/Macclesfield (1), Echunga (1), and Bremer/Callington (1). Wistow obviously punched well above its weight but the surprise is that Mt Barker Reds, Whites and Blues did not win more premierships. The Dr R.V. Pridmore Shield was awarded to the A Grade premier of the MtBDCA and later the MtB&EHCA, from 1935 to 1983. A Colts (Under 16) competition was introduced in about 1964/1965 and continued up until the merger with the Alexandra Cricket Association in 1983.

=== Alexandra and Eastern Hills Cricket Association (1983 - present) ===
The A&EHCA was established ahead of the 1983/1984 season when the Alexandra Cricket Association amalgamated with the Mount Barker and Eastern Hills Cricket Association. The decision to amalgamate the two neighbouring associations was initiated by Keith Ness who was subsequently elected as the first president of the newly established A&EHCA. The foundation clubs of the A&EHCA were Ashbourne, Bremer/Callington, Echunga, Finniss, Langhorne Creek, Macclesfield, Milang, Mount Barker, Nairne, Strathalbyn and Wistow. Finniss went into recess for twelve (12) seasons following the 1995/1996 season before returning in 2007/2008 before entering recess again after the 2022/23 season. Milang went into a brief recess after the 2014/2015 season before returning in 2017/2018 but for just one season before folding. Lobethal and Woodside left the Torrens Valley Cricket Association to join the A&EHCA ahead of the 2011/2012 season, whilst Lenswood Ranges did the same ahead of the 2023/24 season.

Since the A&EHCA was established, the Southern Argus Shield has been presented to the A Grade premier. As of the end of the 2023/2024 season, Nairne has won fifteen (15) premierships, Wistow (5), Strathalbyn (5), Hahndorf (4), Langhorne Creek (3), Mount Barker (3), Milang (3, all in the first five (5) years of the A&EHCA) and relative newcomers, Lobethal (3, the last 3 seasons) and Woodside (1). In 2024/2025 there were 39 senior teams in the association (8 in A Grade, 8 in A2 Grade, 6 in B Grade, 10 in C Grade and 7 in D Grade).

== Current clubs ==
Club	Colours	Nickname	Established / Joined	A Grade Premierships	Premiership Years
Ashbourne		Bulls	1872	13	1910/1911, 1911/1912, 1912/1913, 1920/1921, 1921/1922, 1922/1923, 1923/1924, 1930/1931, 1932/1933, 1933/1934, 1935/1936, 1961/1962, 1962/1963
Bremer / Callington		Cobras	1874	15	1933/1934, 1934/1935, 1936/1937, 1945/1946, 1946/1947, 1947/1948, 1950/1951, 1951/1952, 1952/1953, 1953/1954, 1956/1957, 1957/1958, 1958/1959, 1959/1960, 1969/1970
Echunga		Miners	1862	2	1948/1949, 1977/1978
Finniss		Frillnecks	1872	16	1934/1935, 1936/1937, 1937/1938, 1938/1939, 1939/1940, 1945/1946, 1946/1947, 1947/1948, 1948/1949, 1952/1953, 1964/1965, 1965/1966, 1966/1967, 1975/1976, 1977/1978, 1980/1981
Hahndorf		Magpies	1898	5	1949/1950, 1950/1951, 2000/2001, 2001/2002, 2019/2020
Langhorne Creek		Tigers	1872	9	1954/1955, 1958/1959, 1959/1960, 1960/1961, 1967/1968, 1979/1980, 2003/2004, 2006/2007, 2018/2019
Lenswood		Lions	1977; 2024	4	1978/1979, 1979/1980, 1980/1981, 1981/1982
Lobethal		Tigers	2011	4	2021/2022, 2022/2023, 2023/2024, 2024/2025
Macclesfield		Redbacks	1879	1	1970/1971
Milang		Mozzies	1860	11	1929/1930, 1955/1956, 1956/1957, 1957/1958, 1963/1964, 1969/1970, 1973/1974, 1976/1977, 1983/1984, 1985/1986, 1987/1988
Mount Barker		Kookaburras	1862	20	1934/1935, 1935/1936, 1936/1937, 1937/1938, 1938/1939, 1946/1947, 1947/1948, 1952/1953, 1953/1954, 1954/1955, 1955/1956, 1956/1957, 1957/1958, 1959/1960, 1961/1962, 1968/1969, 1972/1973, 1984/1985, 1988/1989, 1992/1993
Nairne		Razorbacks	1904	18	1954/1955, 1975/1976, 1976/1977, 1991/1992, 1994/1995, 1995/1996, 1998/1999, 2005/2006, 2008/2009, 2009/2010, 2010/2011, 2011/2012, 2012/2013, 2013/2014, 2014/2015, 2016/2017, 2017/2018, 2020/2021
Strathalbyn		Stallions	1869	19	1908/1909, 1926/1927, 1927/1928, 1931/1932, 1949/1950, 1950/1951, 1951/1952, 1953/1954, 1968/1969, 1970/1971, 1971/1972, 1978/1979, 1981/1982, 1982/1983, 1986/1987, 1989/1990, 1990/1991, 1996/1997, 1997/1998
Wistow		Echidnas	1896	14	1951/1952, 1958/1959, 1960/1961, 1963/1964, 1964/1965, 1965/1966, 1966/1967, 1973/1974, 1982/1983, 1993/1994, 1999/2000, 2002/2003, 2004/2005, 2007/2008
Woodside		Warriors	2011	1	2015/2016

== Former clubs ==
Club	Established / Joined	Dissolved / Departed	Premierships	Premiership Years
16th Battalion (Woodside)			0	
2nd Field Ambulance			0	
Belvidere	1934	1940	0	
Biggs Flat	1963	1966	0	
Dawesley	1931	1932	0	
Flaxley	1947			
Hartley	1960	1970	0	
Harrogate	1935	1940	0	
High School (Mt Barker)	1946	1947	0	
High School (Strathalbyn)	1932	1975	2	1972/1973, 1974/1975
Junior Colts (Mt Barker)	1937	1938	0	
Littlehampton	1923	1947	6	1931/1932, 1932/1933, 1935/1936, 1937/1938, 1938/1939, 1939/1940
Meadows	1910	1913	0	
Monarto			0	
Murdoch's Hill	1932	1946	2	
Nairne Veterans			0	
Native Valley	1932	1933	0	
Onkaparinga	1953	1983	4	1962/1963, 1967/1968, 1971/1972, 1974/1975
Watts Brickyard	1933	1949	1	
Woodchester	1920	1936	1	1928/1929
Woodside RSL			1	1955/1956

== Premiership Winners ==
Season	Alexandra Cricket Association	Mt Barker District Cricket Association	Eastern Hills Cricket Association	Mt Barker & Eastern Hills Cricket Association	A&EHCA
1908/1909	Strathalbyn				
1909/1910					
1910/1911	Ashbourne				
1911/1912	Ashbourne				
1912/1913	Ashbourne				
1913/1914					
1914/1915					
1915/1916					
1916/1917					
1917/1918					
1918/1919					
1919/1920					
1920/1921	Ashbourne				
1921/1922	Ashbourne				
1922/1923	Ashbourne				
1923/1924	Ashbourne				
1924/1925					
1925/1926					
1926/1927	Strathalbyn				
1927/1928	Strathalbyn				
1928/1929	Woodchester				
1929/1930	Milang				
1930/1931	Ashbourne				
1931/1932	Strathalbyn		Littlehampton		
1932/1933	Ashbourne		Littlehampton		
1933/1934	Ashbourne		Bremer		
1934/1935	Finniss	Mount Barker Whites	Callington		
1935/1936	Ashbourne	Mount Barker Whites	Littlehampton		
1936/1937	Finniss	Mount Barker Blues	Bremer		
1937/1938	Finniss	Mount Barker Whites	Littlehampton		
1938/1939	Finniss	Mount Barker Blues	Littlehampton		
1939/1940	Finniss	Littlehampton	Watts Brickyard		
1940/1941					
1941/1942					
1942/1943					
1943/1944					
1944/1945					
1945/1946	Finniss		Bremer		
1946/1947	Finniss	Mount Barker Whites	Callington		
1947/1948	Finniss	Mount Barker Blues			
1948/1949	Finniss		Murdoch's Hill		
1949/1950	Strathalbyn	Hahndorf			
1950/1951	Strathalbyn	Hahndorf	Callington		
1951/1952	Strathalbyn	Wistow	Bremer		
1952/1953	Finniss	Mount Barker Blues	Bremer		
1953/1954	Strathalbyn	Mount Barker Whites	Callington		
1954/1955	Langhorne Creek	Mount Barker Whites	Nairne		
1955/1956	Milang	Mount Barker Blues	Woodside RSL		
1956/1957	Milang	Mount Barker Whites	Bremer		
1957/1958	Milang	Mount Barker Whites	Bremer		
1958/1959	Langhorne Creek	Wistow	Bremer		
1959/1960	Langhorne Creek	Mount Barker Blues	Bremer		
1960/1961	Langhorne Creek			Wistow	
1961/1962	Ashbourne			Mount Barker Blues	
1962/1963	Ashbourne			Onkaparinga	
1963/1964	Milang			Wistow	
1964/1965	Finniss			Wistow	
1965/1966	Finniss			Wistow	
1966/1967	Finniss			Wistow	
1967/1968	Langhorne Creek			Onkaparinga	
1968/1969	Strathalbyn White			Mount Barker Reds	
1969/1970	Milang			Bremer/Callington	
1970/1971	Strathalbyn White			Macclesfield-Flaxley	
1971/1972	Strathalbyn White			Onkaparinga	
1972/1973	Strathalbyn High School			Mount Barker	
1973/1974	Milang Blue			Wistow	
1974/1975	Strathalbyn High School			Onkaparinga	
1975/1976	Finniss			Nairne	
1976/1977	Milang Blue			Nairne	
1977/1978	Finniss Green			Echunga	
1978/1979	Strathalbyn			Lenswood Ranges	
1979/1980	Langhorne Creek			Lenswood Ranges	
1980/1981	Finniss			Lenswood Ranges	
1981/1982	Strathalbyn			Lenswood Ranges	
1982/1983	Strathalbyn			Wistow	
1983/1984					Milang
1984/1985					Mount Barker
1985/1986					Milang
1986/1987					Strathalbyn
1987/1988					Milang
1988/1989					Mount Barker
1989/1990					Strathalbyn
1990/1991					Strathalbyn
1991/1992					Nairne
1992/1993					Mount Barker
1993/1994					Wistow
1994/1995					Nairne
1995/1996					Nairne
1996/1997					Strathalbyn
1997/1998					Strathalbyn
1998/1999					Nairne
1999/2000					Wistow
2000/2001					Hahndorf
2001/2002					Hahndorf
2002/2003					Wistow
2003/2004					Langhorne Creek
2004/2005					Wistow
2005/2006					Nairne
2006/2007					Langhorne Creek
2007/2008					Wistow
2008/2009					Nairne
2009/2010					Nairne
2010/2011					Nairne
2011/2012					Nairne
2012/2013					Nairne
2013/2014					Nairne
2014/2015					Nairne
2015/2016					Woodside
2016/2017					Nairne
2017/2018					Nairne
2018/2019					Langhorne Creek
2019/2020					Hahndorf
2020/2021					Nairne
2021/2022					Lobethal
2022/2023					Lobethal
2023/2024					Lobethal
2024/2025					Lobethal

== Shaun Tait Cricketer of the Year ==
The Shaun Tait Cricketer of the Year Award was established during the 2005/2006 season and has been presented to the best and fairest player in the A Grade competition as voted by the umpires. The award is named in recognition of former Australian cricketer Shaun Tait who is a product of the Alexandra and Eastern Hills Cricket Association.

Season	Name	Club
2005/2006	Craig Eckermann	Hahndorf
2006/2007	Andrew Baker	Hahndorf
2007/2008 tied	Steve Nettle	Wistow
2007/2008 tied	Andrew Baker	Hahndorf
2008/2009	Kym Heinrich	Nairne
2009/2010	Clint Foster	Nairne
2010/2011	Todd Heinrich	Nairne
2011/2012	Mark Wimberley	Lobethal
2012/2013	Mark Abbott	Strathalbyn
2013/2014	Mark Abbott	Strathalbyn
2014/2015	Luke Cousins	Strathalbyn
2015/2016	David Wescombe	Woodside
2016/2017	Luke Harrowfield	Nairne
2017/2018	Mark Abbott	Strathalbyn
2018/2019	Mark Abbott	Strathalbyn
2019/2020	Matt Martin	Lobethal
2020/2021	Jarrad Tait	Nairne
2021/2022 tied	Matt Martin	Lobethal
2021/2022 tied	Mitch Hein	Nairne
2022/2023	Brodie Clarke	Nairne
2023/2024	Daniel Kropp	Langhorne Creek
2024/2025	Adam Clements	Langhorne Creek

== Life Members ==
Season	Name	Club
2004/2005	Perry Jones	Strathalbyn
2004/2005	Trevor Calaby	Macclesfield
2004/2005	Keith Ness	Finniss
2009/2010	Clive Wundersitz	Bremer/Callington
2016/2017	Geoff Warren	Langhorne Creek
2017/2018	Roger Farley	Bremer/Callington
2018/2019	Trevor Potts	Langhorne Creek
2019/2020	Cheryl Gillies	Macclesfield
2020/2021	Robin Crompton	Wistow
2020/2021	Andrew Stidston	Ashbourne
2022/2023	Steven Schofield	Strathalbyn
2022/2023	Joe Hill	Finniss
2023/2024	Mark Trafford-Walker	Hahndorf

== Office Bearers ==
Season	President	Vice President	Secretary	Treasurer	Statistician / Programmer
1983/1984	Keith Ness		D Willison	D Willison	B Cornell
1984/1985	Keith Ness	W Potts / N Baulderstone	D Willison	D Willison	Perry Jones
1985/1986	Keith Ness	W Potts / N Baulderstone	D Willison	D Willison	Perry Jones
1986/1987	Keith Ness	G Ladhams / B Taylor	M Elliott	M Elliott	Perry Jones
1987/1988	Keith Ness	B Taylor / R Landseer	M Elliott	M Elliott	Perry Jones
1988/1989	Keith Ness	A Rice / R Landseer	M Elliott	M Elliott	Perry Jones
1989/1990	Keith Ness	J Jaensch / R Landseer	M Elliott	M Elliott	Perry Jones
1990/1991	Stan Schofield		M Elliott	M Elliott	Perry Jones
1991/1992	Stan Schofield		M Elliott	M Elliott	Perry Jones
1992/1993	Stan Schofield		Robin Crompton	Robin Crompton	Perry Jones
1993/1994	Stan Schofield	R Landseer / A Rice	Robin Crompton	Robin Crompton	Perry Jones
1994/1995	Stan Schofield	S Morrison / A Fielke	Roger Farley	Robin Crompton	Perry Jones
1995/1996	Tony Fielke	Terry Hughes	Pat Ryan	Robin Crompton	Perry Jones
1996/1997	Terry Hughes		Eddie Janmaat	Robin Crompton	Perry Jones
1997/1998	Terry Hughes		Eddie Janmaat	Robin Crompton	Perry Jones
1998/1999	Terry Hughes		Eddie Janmaat	Robin Crompton	Perry Jones
1999/2000	Grant Blackwell		Eddie Janmaat	Roger Farley	Perry Jones
2000/2001	Grant Blackwell	Roger Farley	Eddie Janmaat	Roger Farley	Perry Jones / Andrew Stidston
2001/2002	Roger Farley	Gary Wholagan	Mark Cook	Richard Williams	Perry Jones / Andrew Stidston
2002/2003	Roger Farley	Gary Wholagan	Mark Cook	Michael Perrey	Perry Jones / Andrew Stidston
2003/2004	Roger Farley	Gary Wholagan	Geoff Lynn	Michael Perrey	Perry Jones / Andrew Stidston
2004/2005	Roger Farley	Gary Wholagan	Geoff Lynn	Michael Perrey	Perry Jones / Andrew Stidston
2005/2006	Geoff Warren	Gary Wholagan	Geoff Lynn	Michael Perrey	Perry Jones / Andrew Stidston
2006/2007	Geoff Warren	Gary Wholagan	Geoff Lynn	Michael Perrey	Perry Jones / Andrew Stidston
2007/2008	Geoff Warren	Perry Jones	Geoff Lynn	Michael Perrey	Andrew Stidston
2008/2009	Geoff Warren	Perry Jones	Geoff Lynn	Michael Perrey	Andrew Stidston
2009/2010	Geoff Warren	Perry Jones	Geoff Lynn	Cheryl Gillies	Andrew Stidston
2010/2011	Geoff Warren	Perry Jones	Merilyn Lee	Cheryl Gillies	Andrew Stidston
2011/2012	Damien Nettle	Perry Jones	Merilyn Lee	Cheryl Gillies	Joe Hill
2012/2013	Damien Nettle	Joe Hill	Steven Schofield	Cheryl Gillies	Andrew Stidston
2013/2014	Damien Nettle	Joe Hill	Steven Schofield	Cheryl Gillies	Andrew Stidston
2014/2015	Damien Nettle	Joe Hill	Steven Schofield	Cheryl Gillies	Scott Smith
2015/2016	Joe Hill	Andrew Stidston	Steven Schofield	Cheryl Gillies	Scott Smith
2016/2017	Joe Hill	Andrew Stidston	Steven Schofield	Cheryl Gillies	Scott Smith
2017/2018	Joe Hill	Andrew Stidston	Steven Schofield	Cheryl Gillies	Scott Smith
2018/2019	Joe Hill	Andrew Stidston	Steven Schofield	Cheryl Gillies	Scott Smith
2019/2020	Joe Hill	Michael Cutting	Steven Schofield	Cheryl Gillies	Andrew Stidston
2020/2021	Joe Hill	Michael Cutting	Steven Schofield	Cheryl Gillies	Andrew Stidston
2021/2022	Joe Hill	Michael Cutting	Steven Schofield	Cheryl Gillies	Andrew Stidston
2022/2023	Mark Stokes	Michael Cutting	Josh Pegler	Robran Cock	Andrew Stidston
2023/2024	Mark Stokes	Michael Cutting	Josh Pegler	Robran Cock	Andrew Stidston
2024/2025	Mark Stokes	Andrew Stidston	Josh Pegler	Robran Cock	Ben Hull
2025/2026	Mark Stokes	Ben Hull	Josh Pegler	Robran Cock	

== Inter-association Competitions ==
The Alexandra and Eastern Hills Cricket Association competes in representative cricket carnivals against neighbouring associations in the Fleurieu region. The Fleurieu and District Cricket Council coordinates annual carnivals for the Meyer Shield (seniors), Figg Cup (under 21), Calaby Shield (under 15) and Fuller Shield (under 13).

The Alexandra and Eastern Hills Cricket Association have been the carnival winner on the following years:

Meyer Shield - 1988/1989, 1996/1997, 2013/2014, 2021/2022, 2022/2023, 2025/2026

Figg Cup - 2000/2001, 2009/2010, 2012/2013, 2013/2014, 2016/2017, 2020/2021, 2022/2023, 2023/2024

Calaby Shield - 2004/2005, 2005/2006, 2006/2007*, 2008/2009, 2009/2010, 2011/2012, 2013/2014, 2014/2015, 2015/2016, 2016/2017, 2017/2018, 2018/2019, 2022/2023

Fuller Shield - 2001/2002, 2004/2005, 2006/2007*, 2007/2008, 2008/2009, 2011/2012, 2012/2013, 2013/2014, 2014/2015, 2015/2016, 2016/2017

* denotes joint winner
