= John Bleasdale =

British priest (1822–1884)

John Ignatius Bleasdale (1822–28 June 1884) was an English-born Roman Catholic priest, chemist and mineralogist active in Australia and president of the Royal Society of Victoria in 1865.

Bleasdale was born in Kirkham in Lancashire. He was educated at private schools in Preston, then trained to become a priest (1835 to 1845), first at the English College, Lisbon, in Portugal then, forced to return to England by ill health, at St Mary's College, Oscott in Birmingham. Following his ordination by Cardinal Wiseman, Bleasdale served as a military chaplain in Weedon in Britain. He arrived in Victoria (Australia) in 1851 and was appointed to the mission in Geelong. In 1855 he became vice-president of St Patrick's College in Melbourne. He was for several years private secretary to the Bishop of Melbourne.

Bleasdale was a foundation member of the Melbourne Microscopical Society, a fellow of the Geographical and Linnean societies and honorary member of Medical Society of Victoria. He was also one of the leading advocates for wine in Victoria.

Bleasdale migrated to California in 1877, where he held honorary positions as secretary of the Microscopical Society and the Viticultural Society, and provided advice to Californian vinegrowers. He died in San Francisco on 28 June 1884.

Frank Potts (1815–1890) named his Bleasdale Winery in Langhorne Creek, South Australia, for him though there is no evidence the two ever met.
