= Bletchley, South Australia =

Locality in South Australia

Bletchley
- Town
- Interactive map of Bletchley
- Coordinates: 35.25°S 138.99°E
- Country: Australia
- State: South Australia
- LGA: Alexandrina Council
- Established: 1853

Government
  - State electorate: Hammond
  - Federal division: Mayo

Population
  - Total: 76 (SAL 2021)
- Postcode: 5255
Localities around Bletchley
	Woodchester
Strathalbyn	Bletchley	Hartley
Belvidere		Langhorne Creek

Bletchley is a rural locality in the northern Fleurieu Peninsula region of South Australia. It is east of Strathalbyn and north of Langhorne Creek.

== History ==
Bletchley was named by the first settler, David Jones, in 1853 after his home town in England.

The locality previously had a Wesleyan Church, opened in 1857. It also had a post office and general shop, but they no longer exist.There was also a Primitive Methodist church named Pinery a couple of kilometres south along the road to Langhorne Creek.
