= Eastern Fleurieu School =

Coordinates: 35°15′29″S 138°54′08″E

Eastern Fleurieu School R-12
- 11 Callington Road; Strathalbyn, South Australia; Australia

Information
- Other name: Strathalbyn High School
- Type: Public
- Motto: Excellence Through Unity
- Established: 1913
- Principal: Steve Marshall ( –2011); Trevor Fletcher (2011–2017); Ian Kent (2018–)
- Enrollment: ~1,450
- Website: http://www.easternfleurieu.sa.edu.au https://www.facebook.com/EasternFleurieuSchool/

Eastern Fleurieu School, located in Strathalbyn about 50 km southeast of Adelaide in rural South Australia, consists of four separate primary school campuses and one high school campus. In 2017 there were around 1450 students enrolled at the school. At the end of 2017, principal of six years, Trevor Fletcher, retired. He was replaced by Ian Kent, previously the principal of Kangaroo Island's multi-campus schools.

== History ==
Eastern Fleurieu School, formerly known as Strathalbyn High School, was founded in 1913 and consisted of one building currently used as the front office, principal's office, and teachers' lounge. In 1996 the high school merged with the surrounding primary schools to become Eastern Fleurieu School.

2009: A fire broke out in one of the art rooms, causing approximately $200,000 damage.

2011: Trevor Fletcher appointed principal. Many changes happen throughout all the campuses, notably more sporting, science, and music activities.

2013: Centenary of the high school celebrated at the Strathalbyn campus.

2015: Construction begins on the school's $11 million upgrade for a new performing arts centre (now officially known as "The Trevor Fletcher Performing Arts Centre"), home economics, and science buildings.

2016: Fletcher announces his retirement plans.

== Curriculum ==
Eastern Fleurieu School offers a range of subjects from Reception through to Year 12. From years R-6, students focus on 8 main curriculum subjects (Art, Technology, English, Health, Humanities, Science, Languages, and Mathematics) with access to specialist subjects including Art, Music, Drama, and PE. During years 7-12 the students gain more control over the subjects that they wish to focus on with continuous help from teachers to reach appropriate pathways for their future. As well as continuing on the 8 main curriculum subjects, students study Cross-Disciplinary Learning each year and have access to apply for VET courses run through TAFE South Australia. Students are also able to study through Open Access College, where applicable.

=== Sporting activities ===
- SAPSASA (South Australian Primary Schools Amateur Sports Association)
- SASSSA
- R-6 Campus Sports Days
- 7-12 Campus Sports Day
- 7-12 Campus Zone and State Athletics at SA Athletics Stadium
- Southern Secondary Sports Days
- Interschool Swimming

=== Co-curricular activities ===
- School Camps
- Maths, Literacy, Science, and Computing Competitions
- Oliphant Science Awards
- Drama Productions
- Public speaking
- Music Ensembles
- Wakakirri
- Environment Programs

== School Values ==
The school's values of "Integrity, Respect, Responsibility, Care and Compassion, Participation and Cooperation" underpin the behaviours that are positively promoted and explicitly taught at Eastern Fleurieu School.

== Uniform ==
The Eastern Fleurieu School uniform is worn throughout all campuses. The basics of the uniform consist of a white and navy polo shirts, knitted and rugby jumpers and jackets, blue plaid skirts and dresses, and navy and grey pants and shorts. All are paired with fully enclosed black shoes. At the high school campus, a sports uniform and sports shoes are worn during P.E. and for outdoor education. There is also an equine uniform for those participating in Equine Studies.
