= Willyaroo, South Australia =

Willyaroo New Hamburg
- Town
- Coordinates: 35°16′S 138°55′E
- Country: Australia
- State: South Australia
- LGA: Alexandrina Council

Government
  - State electorate: Hammond
  - Federal division: Mayo

Population
  - Total: 387 (2016 census)
- Postcode: 5255
Localities around Willyaroo
| Strathalbyn |
| | Willyaroo | Belvidere |

Willyaroo is a former village now on the southeastern outskirts of Strathalbyn in the Australian state of South Australia. It is crossed by the River Angas.

The name Willyaroo is believed to be an Aboriginal name meaning to invoke a good harvest. The area was known as New Hamburg until the name was changed in 1916.
