= Tolderol Game Reserve =

Protected area in South Australia

- IUCN category VI (protected area with sustainable use of natural resources)
- Location within South Australia
- Location: South Australia, Lake Alexandrina and Tolderol
- Nearest city: Langhorne Creek
- Coordinates: 35°22′14.7396″S 139°8′58.3614″E
- Area: 4.28 km^{2} (1.65 sq mi)
- Established: 26 February 1970
- Governing body: Department for Environment and Water

Tolderol Game Reserve is a protected area in the Australian state of South Australia located on the north-western side of Lake Alexandrina in the localities of Lake Alexandrina and Tolderol about 11 kilometres (6.8 miles) south-east of Langhorne Creek.

The game reserve consists of land in both section 349 within the cadastral unit of the Hundred of Freeling and the "150 link reserve adjacent to section 349". The land first acquired protected area status under the Fauna Conservation Act 1964 as both a fauna conservation reserve and a game reserve on 8 January 1970 and was named as the Tolderol Game Reserve. However, the above proclamation was revoked on 26 February 1970 and the land was then re-proclaimed as a fauna conservation reserve under the Crown Lands Act 1929 and as a game reserve under the Fauna Conservation Act 1964. On 27 April 1972, it was reconstituted as a game reserve under the National Parks and Wildlife Act 1972 without change to its name. As of 2019, it covered an area of 4.28 square kilometres (1.65 sq mi).

In 1980, the game reserve was described as follows:

First reserve in Australia to be set aside as an experimental area for growing of variety of waterfowl food crops, in particular three-cornered bulrush. It is already of outstanding value to waterfowl and variety of other waterbirds. Plegadis falcinellus (glossy ibis, Pluvialis dominica (lesser golden plover), Charadrius bicinctus (double-banded dotterel) and Tringa hypoleucos (sandpiper) which are uncommon birds in South Australia have been recorded...

Tolderol Game Reserve is situated on the shore of Lake Alexandrina and comprises low samphire and bulrush (Scirpus spp.) flats with some shallow pools. Most of the Reserve is less than a metre above normal lake level...

Modifications to the samphire areas have been undertaken in recent years to enhance the habitat for waterfowl. Shooting of duck is allowed during open season.

The game reserve is classified as an IUCN Category VI protected area. In 1980, it was listed on the now-defunct Register of the National Estate.

== See also ==
- Duck hunting in South Australia
