= Lake Plains, South Australia =

Lake Plains South Australia
- Coordinates: 35.37°S 139.04°E
- Population: 48 (SAL 2021)
- Established: 2000
- Postcode(s): 5255
- Time zone: ACST (UTC+9:30)
  - Summer (DST): ACST (UTC+10:30)
- Location: 64 km (40 mi) south of Adelaide city centre; 27 km (17 mi) north-east of Goolwa
- LGA(s): Alexandrina Council
- Region: Fleurieu and Kangaroo Island
- State electorate(s): Hammond
- Federal division(s): Mayo
Mean max temp	Mean min temp	Annual rainfall
26.1 °C; 79 °F	10.3 °C; 51 °F	409.0 mm 16.1 in
Suburbs around Lake Plains:
Langhorne Creek; Angas Plains	Langhorne Creek	Langhorne Creek
Angas Plains; Milang	Lake Plains	Langhorne Creek; Tolderol
Lake Alexandrina	Lake Alexandrina	Lake Alexandrina
- Footnotes: Coordinates; Locations; Climate; Adjoining localities

Lake Plains is a locality in the Australian state of South Australia located about 64 kilometres (40 miles) south of the Adelaide city centre and 27 kilometres (17 miles) northeast of the centre of Goolwa on the west coastline of Lake Alexandrina.

Lake Plains is reported as being a “descriptive name given to a subdivision of section 2113, Hundred of Bremer…” A school operated there from 1862 to 1942. Boundaries were created for the “long established name” in August 2000.

The majority land use within the locality is agriculture. Land use planning is required to take account of flooding due to the route of the Bremer River through the locality to its mouth at Lake Alexandrina. The coastline of the locality is zoned for conservation due to its location within the Coorong and Lakes Alexandrina and Albert Wetland which is listed both as a Ramsar site and a wetland of national importance.

Lake Plains is located within the federal division of Mayo, the state electoral district of Hammond and the local government area of the Alexandrina Council.
