= Trevor Fletcher =

Australian rules footballer

Personal information
- Full name: Trevor Fletcher
- Born: 30 September 1953 (age 73)
- Original team: South Bendigo
- Height: 192 cm (6 ft 4 in)
- Weight: 99 kg (218 lb)
- Position: Ruckman/defender

Playing career^{1}
Years	Club	Games (Goals)
1976-1977	Carlton	4 (0)
- ^{1} Playing statistics correct to the end of 1967.

Trevor Fletcher (born 30 September 1953) is a former Australian rules footballer who played with Carlton in the Victorian Football League (VFL).

After retiring from AFL, he became a successful bureaucrat of the New South Wales and Victorian school systems. Hearing about a large high school in rural South Australia in 2011, he quit his city job as Deputy Director General, Schools, for the NSW Department of Education and Training, to become the principal of Eastern Fleurieu School. At the end of 2017, Fletcher retired after successfully leading the school for six years.
