= Tolderol =

- Suburb
- Coordinates: 35.37°S 139.10°E
- Country: Australia
- State: South Australia
- Region: Fleurieu and Kangaroo Island
- LGA: Alexandrina Council Rural City of Murray Bridge
- Location: 67 km (42 mi) south of Adelaide city centre; 32 km (20 mi) north-east of Goolwa; 32 km (20 mi) south-east of Murray Bridge
- Established: 2000

Government
  - State electorate: Hammond
  - Federal division: Mayo
- Time zone: UTC+9:30 (ACST)
  - Summer (DST): UTC+10:30 (ACST)
- Postcode: 5256
- Mean max temp: 26.1 °C (79.0 °F)
- Mean min temp: 10.3 °C (50.5 °F)
- Annual rainfall: 409.0 mm (16.10 in)
Suburbs around Tolderol
Langhorne Creek; Lake Plains	Langhorne Creek	Lake Alexandrina
Lake Plains	Tolderol	Lake Alexandrina
Lake Alexandrina	Lake Alexandrina	Lake Alexandrina
- Coordinates; Locations; Climate; Adjoining localities

Tolderol is a locality in the Australian state of South Australia located about 67 kilometres (42 miles) south of the Adelaide city centre, 32 kilometres (20 miles) north-east of the centre of Goolwa and 32 kilometres (20 miles) south-west of the centre of Murray Bridge on the west coastline of Lake Alexandrina.

Tolderol's boundaries were created for the part within the Rural City of Murray Bridge in August 2000 and for the part within the Alexandrina Council in March 2000. The locality's name is derived from Tolderol Point, a headland located in the coastline within the locality's boundaries.

The majority land use within the locality is agriculture. Land-use planning is required to take account of the potential for flooding in the locality's north and west due to the passage of the Bremer River through the adjoining locality of Lake Plains to the west. The coastline of the locality is zoned for conservation due to its location within the Coorong and Lakes Alexandrina and Albert Wetland which is listed both as a Ramsar site and a wetland of national importance, and the presence of the protected area known as the Tolderol Game Reserve at its eastern end.

Tolderol is located within the federal division of Mayo, the state electoral district of Hammond and the local government areas of the Alexandrina Council and the Rural City of Murray Bridge.
