= Strathalbyn Post Office =

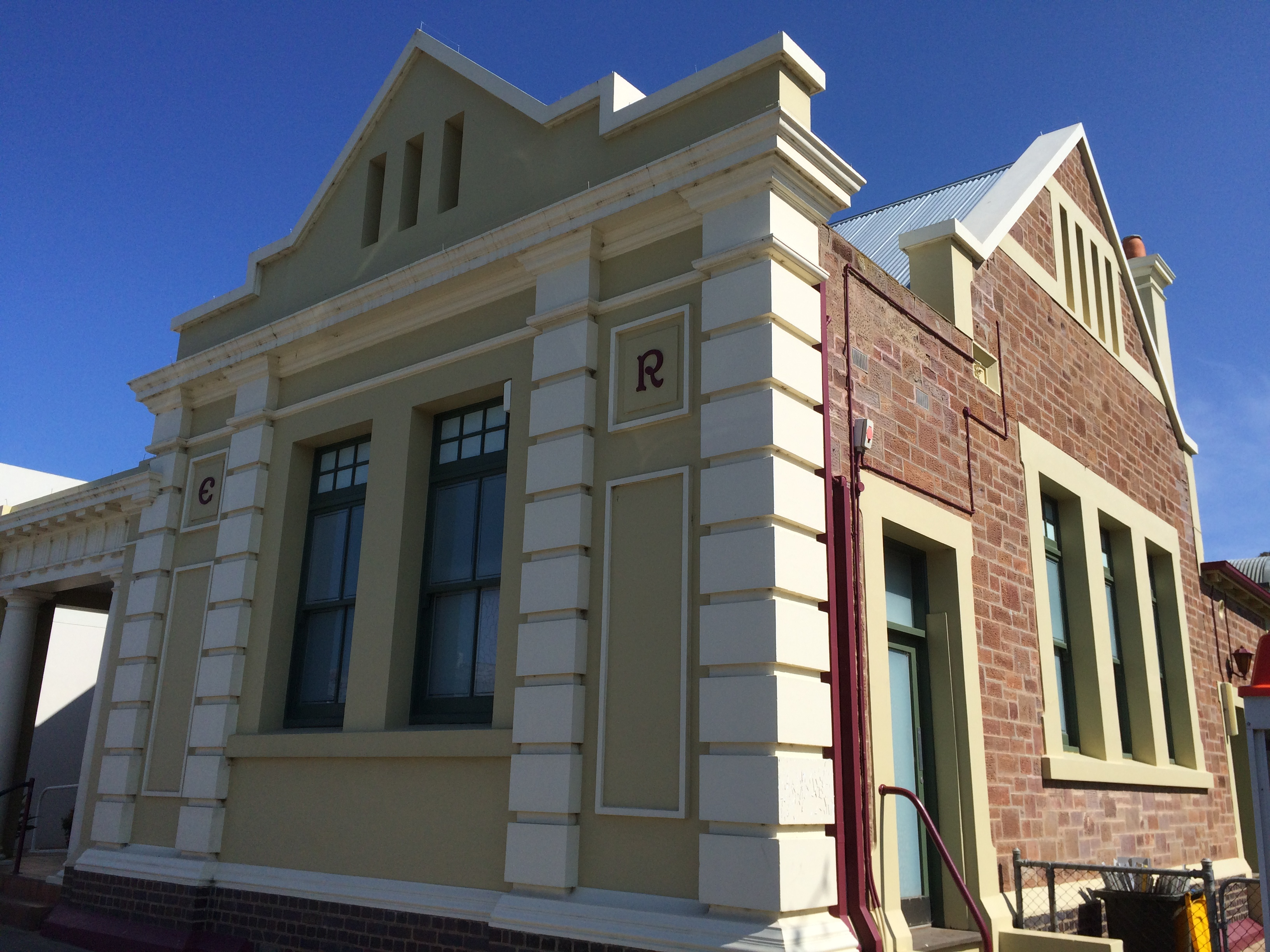

- Location within South Australia
- 35.2592°S 138.8902°E
- Location: 37 Commercial Road, Strathalbyn, South Australia, Australia

Commonwealth Heritage List
- Official name: Strathalbyn Post Office
- Type: Listed place (Historic)
- Designated: 22 June 2004
- Reference no.: 105432

Strathalbyn Post Office is a heritage-listed post office at 37 Commercial Road, Strathalbyn, South Australia, Australia. It was added to the Australian Commonwealth Heritage List on 22 June 2004.

== History ==
The Strathalbyn Post Office was constructed by the South Australian Public Works Department on behalf of the Commonwealth government in 1911–12, under the Superintendent of Public Buildings, Charles E. Owen-Smyth. The building was constructed adjacent to the original post office which had been built in 1859. The original building was used as the post master's residence until around 1968, when a new residence was completed elsewhere and the old building was demolished to provide access to a new telephone exchange at the rear of the allotment. The 1912 post office comprised a lobby, office, telephone exchange, retiring room and provided two public telephones.

The new post office and telephone exchange constructed in 1911 included a lobby, office, telephone exchange, retiring office and bathroom for staff. A free-standing shed in the rear yard appears to be contemporary with the post office and was used as the telephone line technicians' office and store. The post office did not contain a residence as the original post office on the northern portion of the site (1859) was used for this purpose after the new building was completed.

The original post office (then residence) on an adjoining site was demolished in 1965–66 to make way for access to new telephone exchange site. In 1968, a new telephone exchange was constructed at the rear of the site and the original exchange was removed from the post office building; the space was converted to a lunch room and kitchen. It possibly included subdivision of room in southeast corner to create store and toilet. In c. 1960s, the post office underwent a general interior refurbishment including joinery, installation of suspended acoustic ceiling and finishes.

At an unknown date before 1980, the dwarf wall in southern end of the front porch was demolished and a flagpole installed on front gable. At an unknown date before 1995, additional private boxes were installed in the south elevation within and beneath existing window bays and a small timber-framed awning to match the original awnings elsewhere constructed across the windows.

It underwent additions c. 1995 with the relocation of a transportable building from another property, providing post office boxes and delivery centre. The new building was linked to the original by an enclosed corridor. All post boxes were removed from the original building, and the openings in the east wall of the front porch were fitted with sash windows and the south windows were reconstructed with the area beneath filled with rendered panels.

It also underwent a substantial internal refurbishment of the front areas at this time, including removal of the former post master's office partition walls, demolition of original fireplace, reorientation of original counter, installation of standardised post shop retail fittings. The original front doors were replaced with automatic sliding doors and the porch altered to accommodate a disabled access ramp and quarry tiling.

== Description ==
Strathalbyn Post Office is at 37 Commercial Road, Strathalbyn. It is a style fusion of simplified Edwardian Baroque, Federation, and Arts and Crafts movement domestic.

The post office is located in a fairly open wayside site in Commercial Road, the main commercial street of Strathalbyn. Although the northern portion of the site is grassed, it originally contained Strathalbyn's first post office, a prominent building which completed the fine nineteenth and early twentieth century streetscape. The post office is sited opposite the Soldiers War Memorial and public gardens surrounding the Angas River.

The post office is an L-shaped building, tightly formed and massed, with a corner porch entry flanked by two wings. The steeply pitched gabled roof is clad with corrugated galvanised steel with a central lantern ventilator. The projecting street wing has a rendered façade marked by four quasi-Doric rusticated piers and a stepped parapeted gable end. The porch alongside it has two Tuscan columns in antis, a concrete roof and non-original quarry tiling. The side wing, and matching bay on the north side, is in exposed stone with solidly proportioned cement dressing around three large windows and a vent trio above.

The triple vent motif is repeated at the front with two large post hall windows below. These are flanked by two fielded panels shaped from the rendering, and the rusticated piers. These set up an elevational instability characteristic of the Edwardian Baroque and of early twentieth century mannerism. This is also carried through on more Free Style terms on the open side wing, where the central windows are flanked by two doorways at a contrasting level, and all are accentuated against the stone with a thick-chord cement rendering.

The rear wing of the original building is defined by a simple skillion roof form and the more utilitarian window groupings and entrance doors are screened by distinctive curved timber-framed and bracketed awnings.

== Condition and integrity ==
Externally, the original building is relatively intact and clearly able to demonstrate its original typological and architectural intentions. Notwithstanding rear additions and some minor alterations, the original post office component remains legible and contributes positively to the streetscape. Key components which remain are the original roof form and detail (excluding ribbed metal sheeting), the face brick and stonework to walls, gable ends, plinth and dressings, fenestration, window joinery, signage and chimney.

Internally, the original plan form of the public hall and mail room has been altered by the simple reorientation of the counter area, originally the defining element between the two spaces. Refurbishment has concealed or removed most original finishes and fittings, replacing them with modern ceiling lining, carpet, tiling, wall framing and standard retail fit out joinery.

Externally and internally, the building appears to be in relatively sound condition and generally well maintained other than for ongoing maintenance issues with bird droppings, blocked gutters and associated flooding of roof space.

== Heritage listing ==
Strathalbyn Post Office was listed on the Australian Commonwealth Heritage List on 22 June 2004.

The Strathalbyn Post Office, constructed in 1911–1912, is historically important for its association with the development of the township of Strathalbyn. It is an important visual and symbolic landmark for the local community, as one of the few manifestations of the Commonwealth government in the town. Typologically, Strathalbyn Post Office is a highly characteristic regional example of a combined post and telegraph office and telephone exchange. Stylistically, Strathalbyn Post Office is a fine and substantially externally intact example of an Edwardian Baroque and Arts and Crafts hybrid applied to a public building in the "Commonwealth" style. It is substantially unaltered and comparatively rich in decorative detail.

Aesthetically, Strathalbyn Post Office constitutes a harmonious element in the historic streetscape context, and as a backdrop to the Angas River parklands opposite. The integrity of the external form, detailing and fabric contribute to its aesthetic importance, and its visual prominence within the local context. Strathalbyn Post Office is a highly successful and well composed post office building displaying design excellence and craftsmanship. It is considered to be one of Owen-Smyth's most triumphant compositions, demonstrating a simultaneous command of both Classical and Edwardian Baroque detailing.
