= Woodchester, South Australia =

Woodchester South Australia
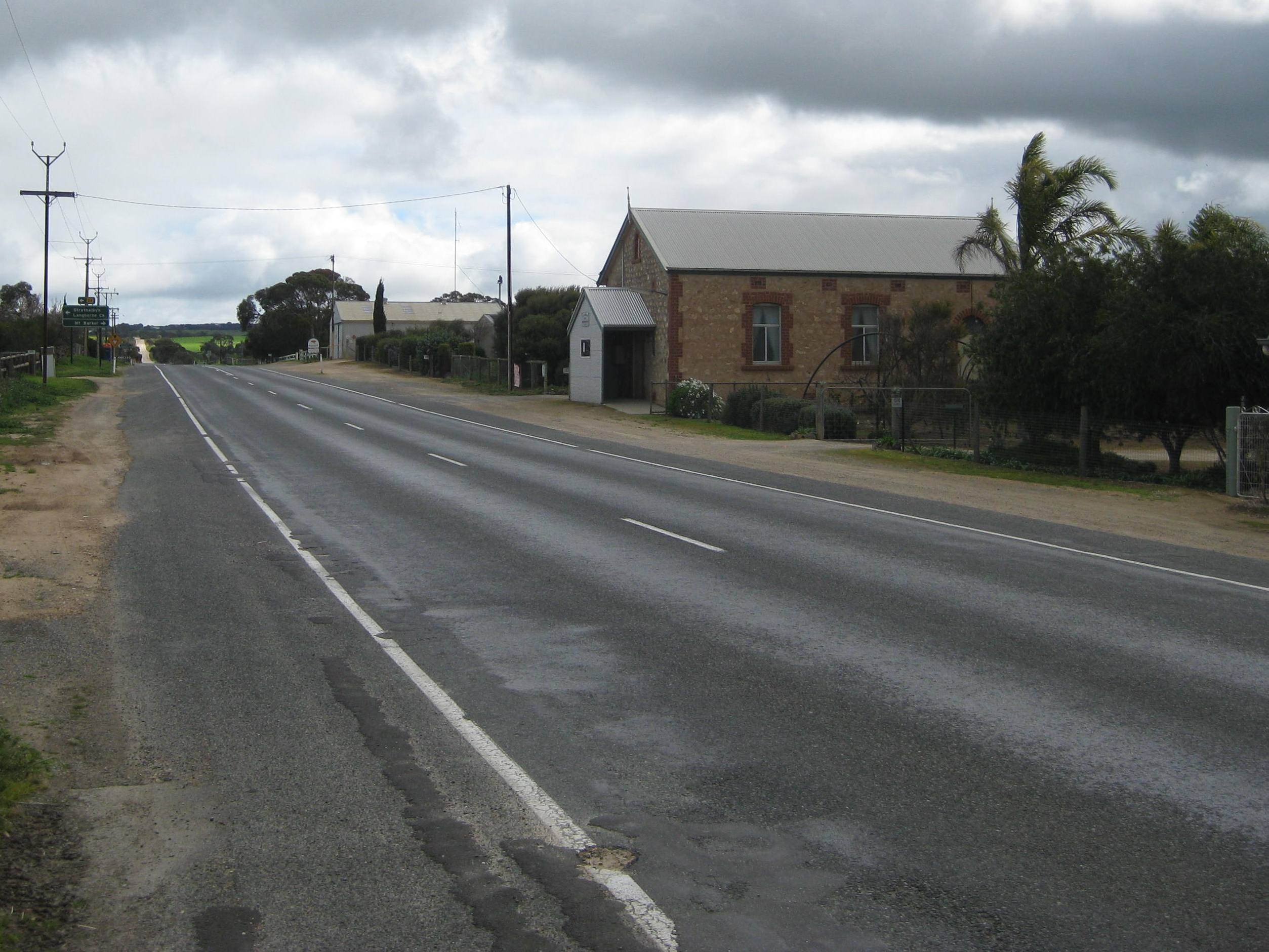
- Main street of Woodchester

- Coordinates: 35.21°S 138.93°E
- Population: 253 (SAL 2021)
- Postcode(s): 5255
- Location: 60 km (37 mi) South of Adelaide city centre
- LGA(s): Alexandrina Council
- Region: Fleurieu and Kangaroo Island
- State electorate(s): Heysen
- Federal division(s): Mayo
Localities around Woodchester:
Highland Valley	Red Creek.	Hartley
Highland Valley; Strathalbyn	Woodchester	Hartley
Strathalbyn	Bletchley	Hartley

Woodchester is a locality in South Australia, situated within the Alexandrina Council. It was originally a private subdivision, but was formally established in August 2000 for the long established name. A section of Woodchester was severed and added to Bletchley in October 2008.

Edward J. Peake purchased Section 1788, Hundred of Strathalbyn in 1841 on behalf of William Leigh of 'Woodchester Park', Gloucestershire, England; it was subdivided in 1856. The settlement was originally known as "Tin Pot". It formerly had a hotel, the Tin Pot Inn, which served as a stopping point for travellers; it closed in 1867, and some ruins of the building survive today. The area also benefited from the successful Wheal Ellen mine, located in adjacent Highland Valley. Tinpot Post Office opened on 25 November 1857, was renamed Woodchester Post Office on 29 October 1858, and was closed on 31 March 1973. A school opened in 1877, but has long since closed.
