= River Angas =

River in South Australia

Angas
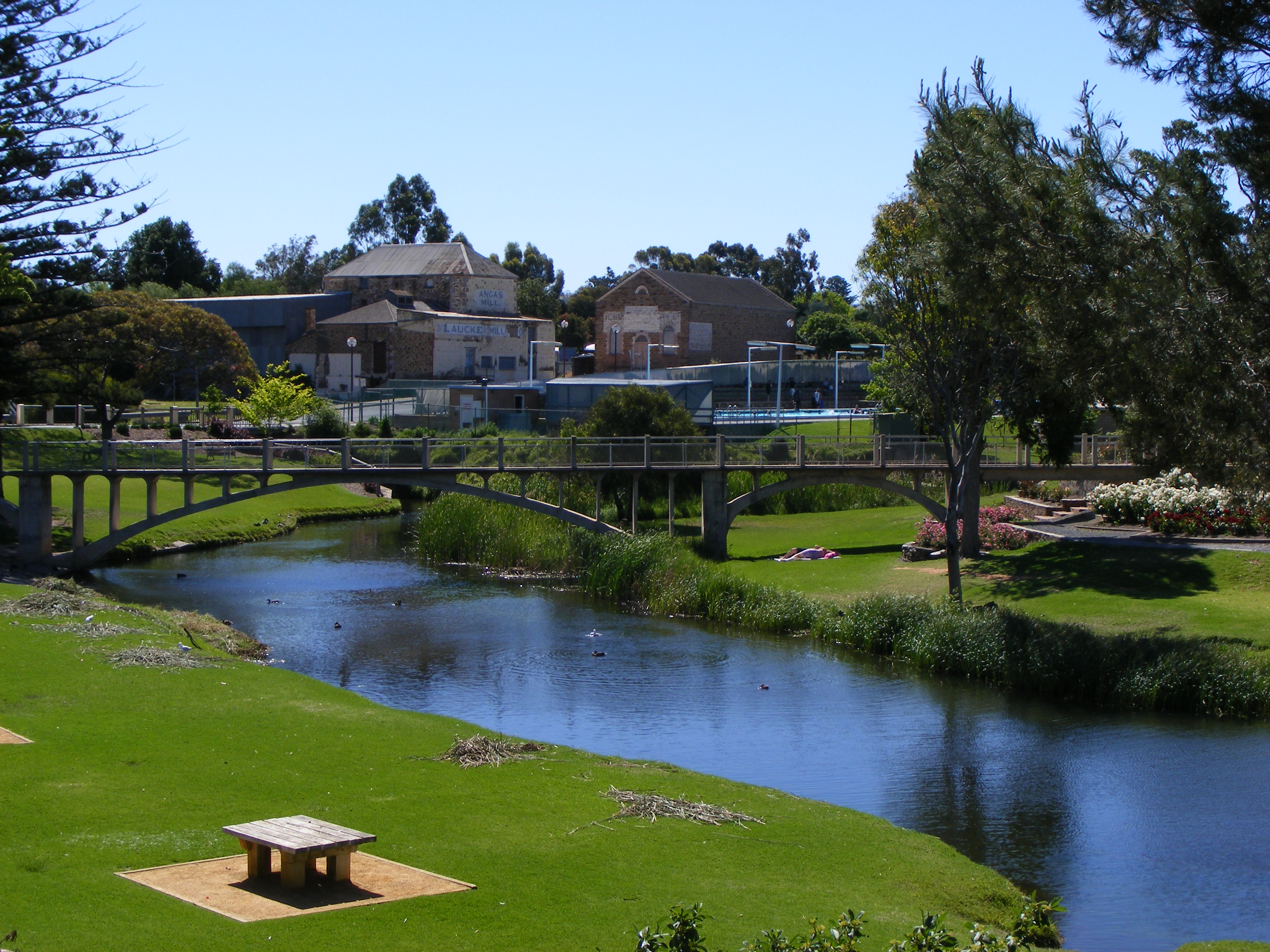
- Angas River in Strathalbyn

- Location of the river mouth in South Australia

Location
- Country: Australia
- State: South Australia
- Region: Adelaide Hills
- Towns: Macclesfield, Strathalbyn, Belvidere

Physical characteristics
- Source: Bugle Ranges, Mount Lofty Range
  - location: Flaxley
  - coordinates: 35°08′18″S 138°48′25″E
  - elevation: 232 m (761 ft)
- Mouth: Lake Alexandrina
  - location: Milang
  - coordinates: 35°23′54″S 138°59′58″E
  - elevation: 0 m (0 ft)
- Length: 49 km (30 mi)

Basin features
- River system: River Murray catchment

The River Angas, part of the River Murray catchment, is a river in the Adelaide Hills region in the Australian state of South Australia.

== Course and features ==
The River Angas arises on the eastern side of the Mount Lofty Ranges. Its headwaters are near Macclesfield and it flows generally southward through Strathalbyn, emptying into Lake Alexandrina near the town of Milang. The river descends 232 metres (761 ft) over its 49-kilometre (30 mi) course.

Towns along the river include Macclesfield, Strathalbyn and Belvidere.

== Etymology ==
The river was named on 31 December 1837, during the exploration by Robert Cock, William Finlayson, A. Wyatt and G. Barton from Adelaide to Lake Alexandrina. "We gave to this river the name of Angas, in honour of the chairman of the South Australian Company, whose interest in and exertions on behalf of the colony are well known."

== See also ==
- List of rivers of Australia § South Australia
