= Hartley, South Australia =

Ghost town in South Australia

Hartley South Australia
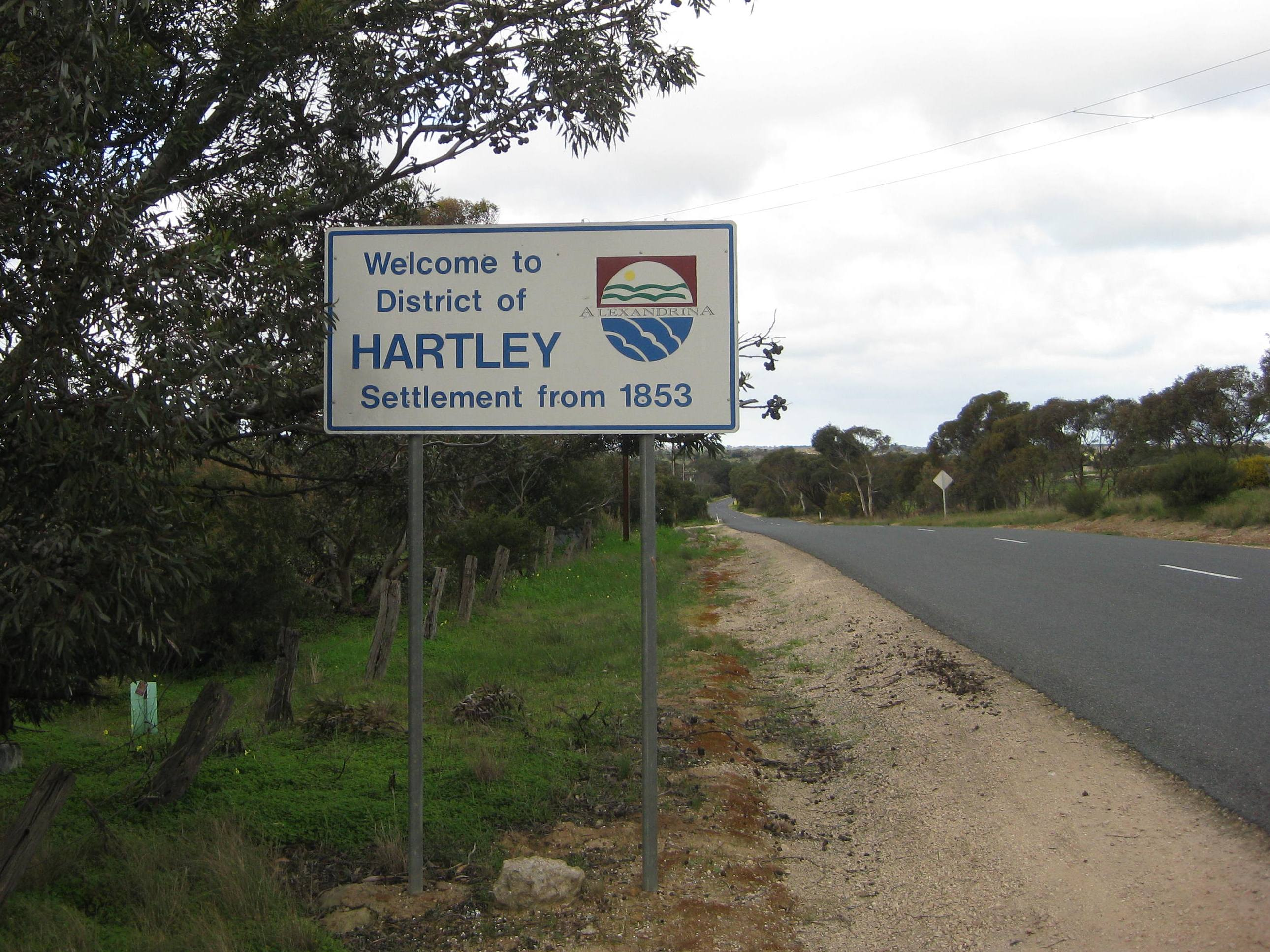
- Hartley entrance sign

- Coordinates: 35.1832929°S 139.0030330°E
- Population: 149 (SAL 2021)
- Established: 1856
- Postcode(s): 5255
- Location: 15 km (9 mi) north-east of Strathalbyn; 11 km (7 mi) south of Callington
- LGA(s): Alexandrina Council
- Region: Fleurieu and Kangaroo Island
- State electorate(s): Heysen
- Federal division(s): Mayo
Localities around Hartley:
Red Creek	Callington, Salem	Monarto South
Woodchester	Hartley
Bletchley	Langhorne Creek

Hartley is a ghost town located in South Australia, along the Bremer River on the Strathalbyn-Callington Road.

Founded in 1853 as a small rural settlement, it once boasted a Methodist church (1856), post office (opened 1869 and closed 1981), school (opened 1919 and closed 1970) and creamery. Now the town is little more than a series of ruins and farm houses.
