= Frank Potts (winemaker) =

Australian winemaker (1815–1890)

- Born: 11 July 1815; Hounslow, London
- Died: 15 December 1890 (aged 75); Langhorne Creek, South Australia
- Occupations: Carpenter, boat builder, winemaker

Frank Potts (11 July 1815 – 15 December 1890) was the founder of Bleasdale winery at Langhorne Creek, South Australia, which has remained in the Potts family to the present day.

Potts was born in Hounslow, England, the second child (their daughter Anne was born on 28 November 1812) of Elizabeth (who died before 1820) and Lawrence Potts (ca.1760 – 9 June 1845), a linen draper and later a bookseller. They moved to Portsmouth around the time of Elizabeth's death. On 29 June 1820 Lawrence married again, to the widow Elizabeth Lockett who already had two children, Elizabeth (born ca.1796) and Margaretta (born 1810). All four children were eventually to migrate to South Australia: Frank in 1835, Anne (who had married Henry Ayers on 14 June 1840), on the Fairfield late in 1840 (with her father and stepmother who died on the voyage), Margaretta (1810–1890) as Margaretta Baker around 1853, and Elizabeth (1796 – 19 September 1874) as Elizabeth Churcher in 1864.

== Working life and migration ==
Frank Potts joined the Navy at the age of 9, serving on HMS Victory for three years, HMS Challenger for six years. He then worked as a carpenter and ship's chandler until deciding to emigrate to South Australia. He was one of the original settlers of South Australia, arriving with Governor Hindmarsh on HMS Buffalo in 1836. He had carpentry skills and a set of tools, so was much in demand constructing the first houses. He next worked under Thomas Lipson, the first harbourmaster, as one of five crewing the pilot boat Mary Ann under Hugh Quinn. He bought land at nearby Albert Town and built a cottage there, which also became his father's last residence. On the property transfer document Frank described his occupation as "carpenter" so that may have been his trade in the Navy.

Meanwhile, he built for himself a sailboat Musquito then Petrel, which was eventually a two-masted ketch of 13 tons burthen. In 1842 he moved to American River, Kangaroo Island, fishing, farming, harvesting salt and trading with Adelaide on Petrel. And while there, he built the larger ketch Kangaroo with John Buick, considered the "father" of American River. In 1846 he sold Petrel and returned to the mainland, living in the vicinity of Port Adelaide, and sold his Albert Town property in 1847, having met the girl he was to marry, Augusta Wenzel. Her family had arrived on the Heerjebhoy Rustomjee Patel from Bremen on 18 September 1845. She and Frank married on 17 February 1848, and may have lived with the Wenzel family at Frewville.

In 1849 Frank, with William Carter and George Mason, built a ferry for crossing the Murray at Wellington. In 1850 he purchased two sections of land totalling 217 acres straddling the River Bremer. He built a modest home and began growing wheat and built "Travellers' Rest", a public house for the benefit of travellers on the way to the gold diggings, which he leased to one F. E. Gardiner. Augusta's father and three of her brothers, who had made some money at the Bendigo goldfields, took up land at Langhorne Creek, as did Henry Ayers, George Mayo, John Ridley, and many others who later had a part in the Potts family history.

He built a bullock-powered sawmill and began clearing the 30 acres either side of the river for a vineyard, which was watered by a bullock-powered pump. In 1858 he planted Shiraz and Verdelho grapes and built a cellar and still. As well as those he built for Bleasdale, Frank built redgum vats for other nearby vineyards: at "Montura" for Mr Hector, at "Metala" (later taken over by Ronald Martin of "Stonyfell") for Arthur Formby. In 1860 he built a wine-press of his own design. He built a bullock-dray to carry redgum timber to the sawmill. Around 1868 he named his property "Bleasdale" after the Rev. John Ignatius Bleasdale, a viticulturist, though there is no evidence they ever met.

=== Retirement ===
As his sons grew to adulthood, Frank was able to leave work on the vineyard, winery and stills to them, and put his energy into his first love – boatbuilding. He had already built the 57 foot Swallow for Archibald Cooke in 1859 and another for William Bowman. The paddle steamers Wilcannia (1875) for Captain Tinks (died 1889) of Milang and Bourke (1876) for Albert Landseer, several barges, a punt for James Rankine (for the crossing known today as Rankines Ferry), and some eight sailing boats, which were used to carry wheat across Lake Alexandrina to Goolwa. First was the Souter Johnnie, then the Tam o' Shanter. He built the fast yacht Pasquin for Allan McFarlane of Wellington, then the Beltana, which proved even faster. He also sailed in races at Port Adelaide with some success. His last ship, "Noah's Ark", had a beam of 12 feet and length 31 feet; its purpose and fate are unknown, though he did sail it at the 1889 Milang Regatta, then cruised the Coorong for two weeks with sons Arthur and Dick.

Frank Potts died on 15 December 1890 after five months' illness.

Although a well-known figure in the district, he had no political ambitions, was not a churchgoer and took little part in public affairs.

=== Family of Frank Potts ===
Frank had an older sister Anne (28 November 1812 – 14 August 1881) who married Henry Ayers at Alverstoke on 14 June 1840. They, with father Lawrence and his second wife Elizabeth followed Frank to South Australia on the Fairfield, arriving in November 1840, though Elizabeth died on the voyage, on 8 October 1840. Lawrence died at Port Adelaide 9 June 1845, aged 84. His stepsister Margaretta, née Lockett (1810–1890) and her husband Arthur John Baker (1814 – 4 July 1900), arrived in July 1852 via New South Wales. Baker was a member of Peter Warburton's 1858 exploration party through Lake Eyre and Lake Torrens, worked for William Younghusband and became a successful pastoralist and South Australia's first Superintendent of Fire Brigades.

On 17 February 1848 Frank married Augusta Wenzel (1830 – 21 November 1871) Their children included:

- Ann "Annie" (1851 – c. 30 August 1934) was handed the responsibility of bringing up the family after the death of her mother. She never married. Much of her last years was spent at Dartford Hospital at 10 Winchester Street, St. Peters as a result burns incurred after a candle set her nightwear alight.
- Frederick "Fred" (1852 – 9 November 1907) shared his father's love of the sea. He worked as a seaman on the seagoing ships Kadina, Beltana and Collingrove. He settled down at Bleasdale as a vigneron and a boatbuilder in his spare time. Nyroca and Brigand were two yachts he built for himself and raced successfully. He married Bertha Wenzel (19 August 1865 – c. 1957) on 30 April 1889; they had four children. He had accountancy skills and was popularly called on to do tax returns. He was appointed J.P. in 1896. He killed himself by gunshot after concerns for his rapidly deteriorating health.
- Henry "Harry" (1854 – 23 April 1926) married Margaret Mary Theresa McDonnell (c. 1874 – 1952) on 5 February 1894; they had three children, but the marriage was not a happy one; there were religious differences and she was an abusive alcoholic. She died at Parkside Lunatic Asylum on 6 September 1952.
- Elizabeth "Lizzie" (9 March 1857 – 28 December 1931) married local shopkeeper William "Willy" Smith on 8 June 1882. Willy had moderate success as a business manager, ending up in Menzies, Western Australia, but just as his family was readying to join him, on 5 February 1900, he killed himself by firing a bullet into his brain. Lizzie died of heart failure during a heat wave. His sons, Frank Berry Smith and Wilson Berry Smith were successful in the fields of chemistry and journalism respectively.
- Frank II (31 July 1859 – 18 August 1917) married Alice Elizabeth Bridgeman c. 1860 (– 1 September 1935) of Blakiston on 6 June 1888; they remained at Bleasdale and ten of their children reached maturity. Though he was left the bulk of the Bleasdale property by his father, his brothers did not appear to bear him any ill-will.
- Edward "Ted" (2 July 1861 – 16 May 1922) moved to Jondaryan, near Toowoomba, Queensland, where he married Honorah "Norah" McDonnell (c. 1868 – 2 August 1905) on 22 October 1888. After reverses which left them penniless, they returned, with the help of father Frank, to South Australia, building a home "Kookaburra" on part of the "Bleasdale" estate. They had three sons: Lawrence, Ballance and (Edmund) Otto. Ted married for a second time, to Elizabeth Matilda "Tilly" Collingridge in 1920. She had three sons from a previous marriage, then Allan Dean Gordon was born to Ted.
- Lewis or (later) Louis (8 March 1866 – 24 October 1926) married Mary Elizabeth Burgess on 18 July 1893. He was licensee of the Bridge Hotel, Langhorne Creek and was involved in greyhound racing, as was their son Louis Richmond, better known as "George" or "Poogee". Other children were Florence Olive, Alma Augusta, Thomas Francis, Henry Stephen "Harry" and Frederick Stanley "Fred". Florence married William Noles on 19 January 1916. Alma married Alfred Horace Howard on 21 April 1914.
- Lucy (4 November 1868 – 7 July 1933) married Louis Leonard Daenke (whose father Herman established the "Metala" vineyard) on 26 May 1888. Their first son, Frederick, was born three months later. They settled near Tatiara and developed a farm also called "Metala". They had two further sons: Harold and Horace, then three girls:Dorace, Lucy and Elsie Idalia. Of his offspring, only Horace and Elsie were to have children.

Augusta died in childbirth. In January 1872 Frank married Anne Flood (c. 1842 – ) and had two more sons:

- Arthur (13 March 1879 – 17 August 1904) was a talented cricketer and artist. He studied painting at the South Australian School of Design under H. P. Gill and in London under Sir Hubert Herkomer. In 1904 his painting Maid of Degree was exhibited at the Royal Academy. The Art Gallery of South Australia holds one of his black-and-white sketches England Won the Test Match .... He died in Bushey, near London, of tuberculosis.
- Richard "Dick" (22 December 1880 – 6 July 1959) was the eccentric of the family. He was a man of irregular habits; he never shaved and never married. He must have invested his inheritance wisely, as he was never known earn money by work, but was able to spend money on gadgets that interested him. He was intelligent and well read, as he usually completed The Advertiser's "Crossquiz" within a few minutes.

== Frank Potts II ==
With the death of his father, Frank II continued with the business, assisted by his uncle Fritz Wenzel in charge of the cellar and cooperage. Around 1904 he purchased the Bridge Hotel in Langhorne Creek, and extended his landholding. On his death, his widow Alice and eldest son Arthur continued running the business until her death in 1935.

=== Family of Frank II ===
He married Alice Elizabeth Bridgeman (ca.1868 – 1935). Among their eleven children were:

- Arthur B(ridgeman) "AB" "Artie" (19 July 1893 – April 1962) married Dorothy Glen Mott ( – June 1962) on 6 September 1916. He managed the family business through difficult times and added considerably to its assets. He was an expert rifle shooter, winning many records and trophies, and was also a keen cricketer. He was a generous donor to Langhorne Creek causes such as the Memorial Park, Bowls Club and Soldiers' Memorial Hall.
- Alice Ada Augusta "Mandy" "Dolly" (16 September 1895 – 25 March 1971) married winemaker Angus Jeffrey "Jerry" Borrett.
- Frank III (Frank Reginald) (10 February 1897 – 30 August 1919) fought in France in the Great War, received a serious leg injury and suffered from shell-shock so was invalided out; on returning to "Bleasdale" suffered a seizure, fell into a fire and was badly burned. He died shortly after from a resulting infection.
- Henry L(eonard) "Fiddle" (1 June 1899 – 1 September 1970) ran "Bleasdale"'s distillation plant for almost 40 years. He too was a capable marksman, winning many prizes for pigeon shooting, and was a proficient duck hunter. He married Effie Victoria Craig (ca.1900 – 1 April 1974); they had two sons Len and Kevin who helped with their father's personal vineyard. Ten tons of Shiraz and Cabernet Sauvignon grapes from this vineyard were made into the wine which won Wolfgang Blass his first gold medals in 1968.
- Alan V(ictor) "Diddy" (27 February 1902 – 9 September 1989), the head winemaker, was a proficient shooter and noted photographer. He married Ursula "Ursie" Noles; they had three sons, John, Frank and David and lived most of their married life in "Kookaburra", the home built by Ted Potts.
- (Charles) Dudley "Dud" (9 June 1909 – 24 June 1944) married (Phyllis) Mae Boothey on 29 March 1941. He enlisted in the RAAF as a wireless operator and was captured in Java by the Japanese and interned in Serang at the same time as Rohan Rivett then Singapore and was one of those who died when the transport Tamahoko Maru was unwittingly torpedoed by Tang (SS-306) when taking prisoners to Japan.
- Lloyd S(tanley) (1912–1989) was a keen motorcyclist and worked for George Bolton's garage at Dulwich.

== Modern Bleasdale ==
In 1948 the brothers combined their inheritances into a company Bleasdale Vineyards Ltd. Around 1961 Bleasdale followed the demand for table wines with a Malbec and by 1967 production of spirit had ceased completely; the fortifying spirit for their port being brought in from Nuriootpa.

== Sources ==
- Smith, Wilson Berry et al. Bleasdale 1850–1986 Langhorne Creek 1986 ISBN 1 86252 249 9
- Potts, Lorraine M. (ed.) Frank Potts of Langhorne Creek; His Children and Grandchildren Langhorne Creek 2004 ISBN 0 646 43622 8
