= Belvidere, South Australia =

Belvidere South Australia
- Coordinates: 35.291°S 138.947°E
- Postcode(s): 5255
- Location: 8 km (5 mi) SE of Strathalbyn
- LGA(s): Alexandrina Council
- Region: Fleurieu and Kangaroo Island
- State electorate(s): Heysen
- Federal division(s): Mayo
Localities around Belvidere:
Strathalbyn	Bletchley
Willyaroo	Belvidere	Langhorne Creek
	Angas Plains

Belvidere is a small town in the Alexandrina Council area of South Australia. With the advent of improved transport, the town no longer has a school or post office. The Soldier's Memorial Hall was built in 1921 to commemorate the 17 young men of the district who served in World War I, five of whom did not return. It remains a part of the town and available for hire. It is located on the main road between Strathalbyn and Langhorne Creek, near the junction where the road to Milang branches off.
