= Langhorne Creek, South Australia =

Langhorne Creek
- Town
- Coordinates: 35°17′51″S 139°02′04″E
- Country: Australia
- State: South Australia
- Region: Fleurieu and Kangaroo Island
- LGA: Alexandrina Council

Government
  - State electorate: Hammond
  - Federal division: Mayo
- Elevation: 15 m (49 ft)

Population
  - Total: 444 (2021 census)
- Time zone: UTC+9:30 (ACST)
  - Summer (DST): UTC+10:30 (ACDT)
- Postcode: 5255
- County: Hindmarsh; Sturt
- Mean max temp: 21.7 °C (71.1 °F)
- Mean min temp: 13.0 °C (55.4 °F)
- Annual rainfall: 421.2 mm (16.58 in)
Localities around Langhorne Creek
Bletchley	Bletchley; Hartley; Monarto South	Brinkley
Belvidere	Langhorne Creek	Brinkley; Mulgundawa; Lake Alexandrina
Angas Plains	Lake Plains; Tolderol	Lake Alexandrina

Langhorne Creek (formerly Langhorne's Creek) is a town in South Australia, located approximately 55 kilometres (35 miles) from the Adelaide city centre. At the 2021 census, Langhorne Creek had a population of 444 residents.

Langhorne Creek gained its name from "Alfred Langhorne", a cattle drover, who brought cattle overland to his property during the 1840s. Alfred established a well known crossing across the nearby Bremer River that was aptly nicknamed Langhorne's Crossing, eventually becoming the location where the town was established.

Being near the Bremer River, Langhorne Creek regularly experiences flooding, with growers utilizing this water for irrigation or vineyards and pastures. This coexistence with flood waters is unique within Australia and one of the few places in the world where flood water is the main source of irrigation.

== Wine Industry ==
Langhorne Creek has a wine history dating back to the 1850's. Langhorne Creek has grown to become the third highest grape producing region in South Australia, producing over 40,000 tonnes annually. Traditionally a red wine growing district well known for production of outstanding Cabernet Sauvignon and Shiraz, these two red wine grape varieties constitute approximately 70% of the total vineyard plantings in the region. Over recent years, considerable experimentation has occurred and a wide range of grape varieties are now grown. The vineyards harvest their fruit from late February to late April.

== Features ==
Frank Potts Reserve (named for the founder of the nearby Bleasdale winery) and Alfred Langhorne Park (for one of the cattle-droving brothers Alfred and Charles) are popular places to picnic and excellent areas to observe native flora and fauna. The township also has numerous other places to eat.

== Sport ==
Despite its relatively small population, Langhorne Creek boasts a strong culture of success across a number of sports. Langhorne Creek fields teams in: Australian rules football, netball, cricket, tennis, lawn bowls and many others. The main venue for football, cricket, netball, tennis and lawn bowls is Langhorne Creek Memorial Park which is located at Murray Road, Langhorne Creek.

The Langhorne Creek Football Club was established in 1906 and currently competes in the Great Southern Football League. Known as the Hawks, Langhorne Creek Football Club has enjoyed a sustained period of success since 2000 having won the GSFL A Grade premiership six times (2001, 2002, 2011, 2012, 2018, 2019) and has consistently been among the strongest clubs in the region during that time while being the smallest club.

The Langhorne Creek Cricket Club was established in 1889 and joined the Alexandra Cricket Association as a foundation member in 1908. It currently competes in the Alexandra & Eastern Hills Cricket Association winning three premierships (2003/04, 2006/07, 2018/19) since the league formed in 1983/84. With a relatively round oval, a turf wicket, a new electronic scoreboard and a lovely outfield, it is a great place to play cricket. The LCCC has three senior teams and three junior teams and are known as the "Tigers".
