= Strathalbyn, South Australia =

Strathalbyn
- Town
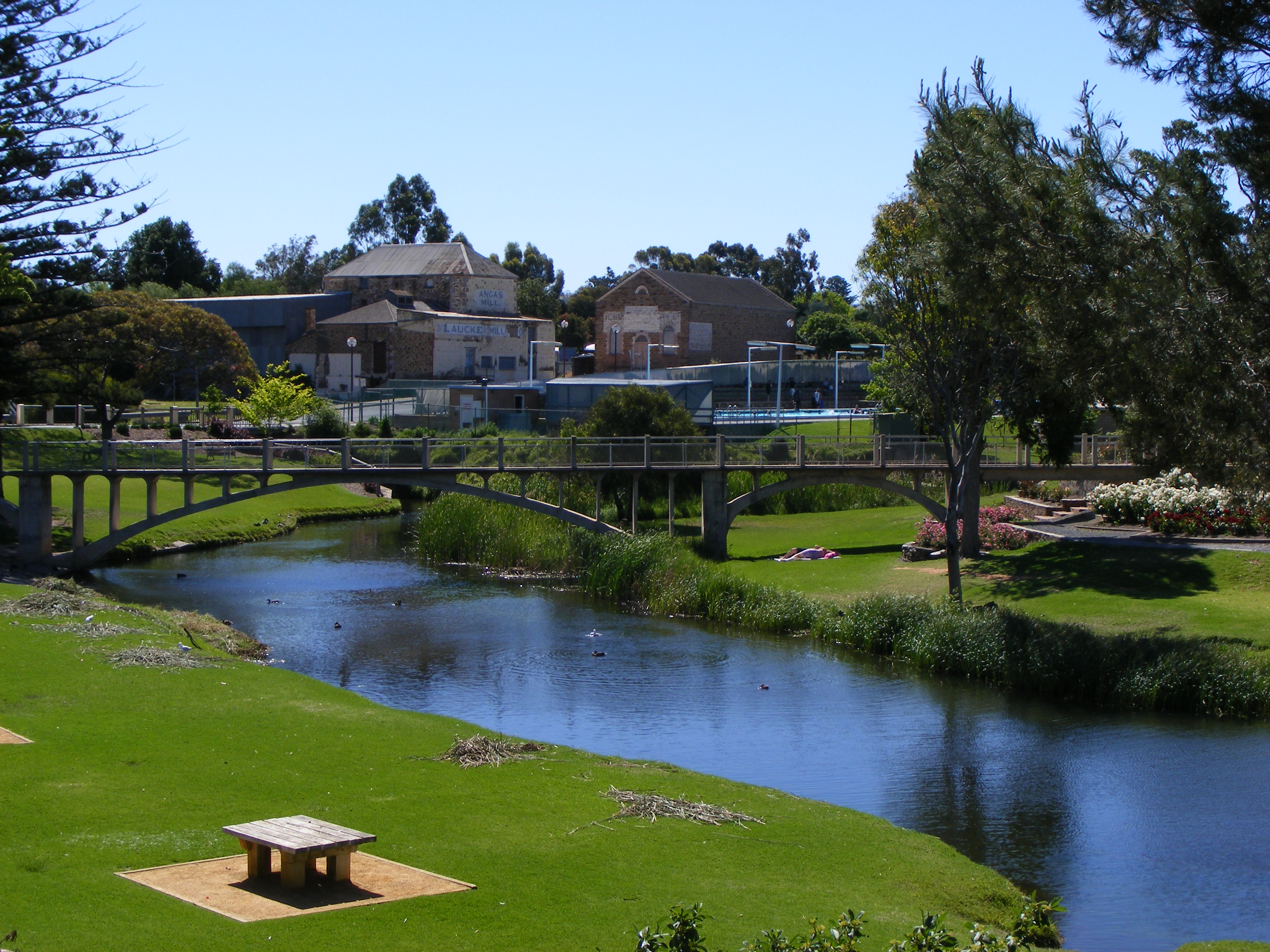
- The Children's bridge and River Angas in Strathalbyn

- Coordinates: 35°16′0″S 138°54′0″E
- Country: Australia
- State: South Australia
- Region: Fleurieu and Kangaroo Island
- LGA: Alexandrina Council
- Location: 60 km (37 mi) from Adelaide
- Established: 1839

Government
  - Federal division: Mayo

Population
  - Total: 7,871 (2021 census)
- Postcode: 5255
Localities around Strathalbyn
Blackfellows Creek	Macclesfield	Highland Valley
Ashbourne	Strathalbyn	Langhorne Creek
Goolwa North	Clayton	Willyaroo

Strathalbyn is a town in the Australian state of South Australia in the Alexandrina Council, located approximately 60 kilometres (37 mi) southeast of the state capital of Adelaide. In 2021 the town had a population of approximately 7,871, being located on the banks of the River Angas at the southeastern edge of the Adelaide Hills and beginning of the Fleurieu Peninsula.

== History ==
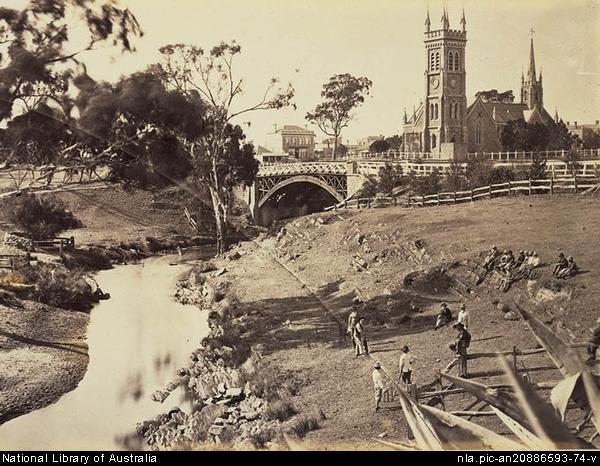
Strathalbyn circa 1869

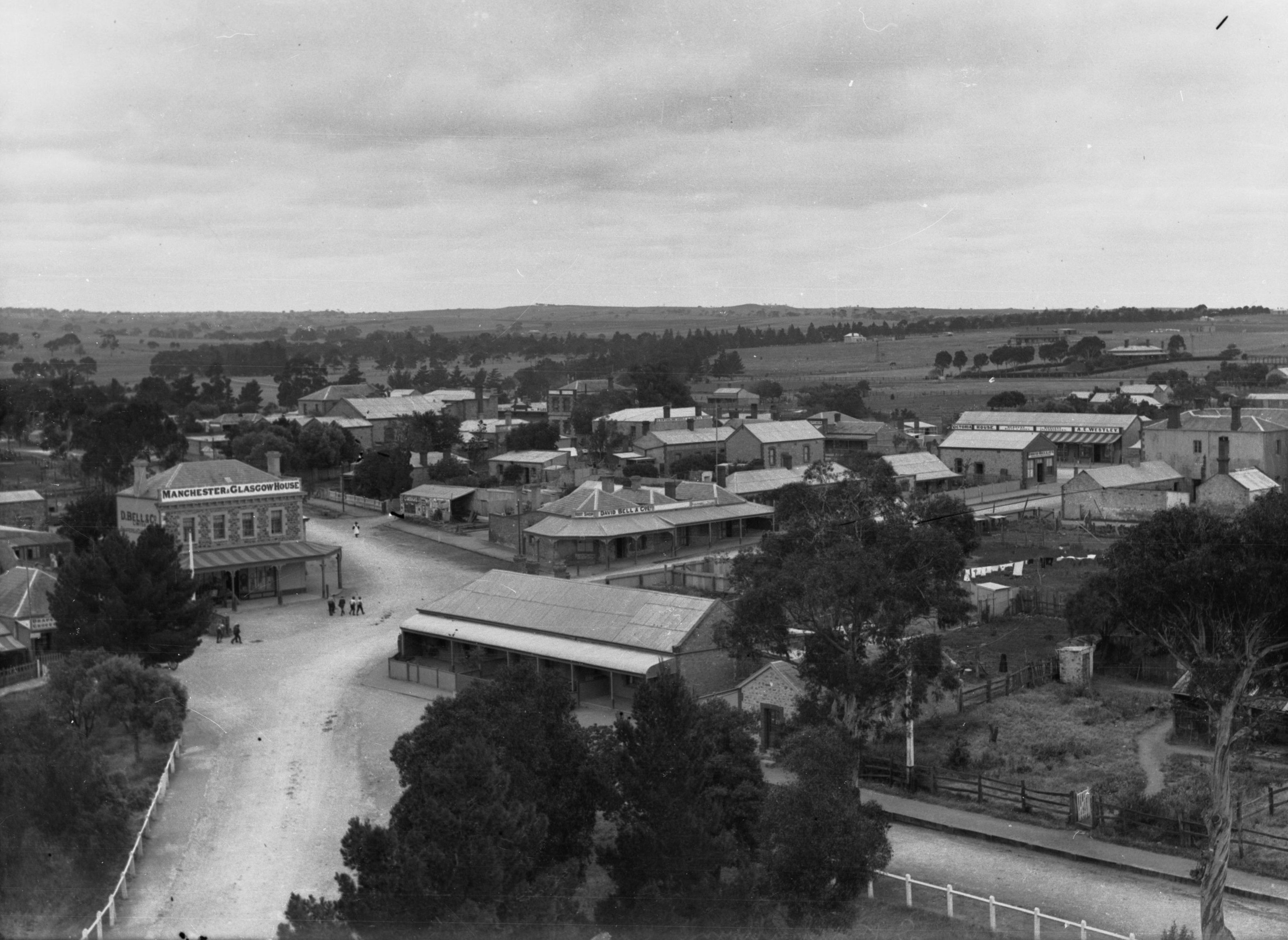
Strathalbyn, looking north-east from St Andrew's Church, 1906

Aboriginal Australian people are indigenous to the area in which Strathalbyn is now located. Among them were tribes which are now commonly described as the Ngarrindjeri people, a generic ethnonym popularised by English missionary George Taplin for the various, distinct groups of people who occupied much of the Fleurieu Peninsula, lower Murray River and Coorong regions prior to and after colonisation.

The town was founded in 1839, the first landholders being Dr. Rankine, followed by Donald McLean. In 1846, the cadastral division, the Hundred of Strathalbyn, was proclaimed including the township of Strathalbyn at the south-western corner of the division. Strathalbyn was once a major stop on the route between Melbourne and Adelaide.

The streets were laid out in a broad and liberal manner, with a large area reserved on either side of the River Angas for recreation purposes, plus a site for a Presbyterian Church and cemetery. The community was soon the centre for a large pastoral and farming population, many of Scottish origin. Mining later became important in the area.

The District Council of Strathalbyn was established in 1854. In 1868 a municipal council, the Corporation of Strathalbyn, was formed by the secession of section 2600 of the Hundred of Strathalbyn from the district council. The town and district councils re-amalgamated in 1976.

Strathalbyn was connected by broad gauge horse tram to Goolwa and Victor Harbor from 1869. The Victor Harbor railway line was extended to Mount Barker and Adelaide and was upgraded for steam engines from 1884. It was isolated again in 1995 when the Adelaide-Melbourne railway line was converted to standard gauge. The SteamRanger historic tourist train runs on the isolated broad gauge line, including stops at Strathalbyn.

== Geography ==
=== Climate ===
Strathalbyn has a warm-summer mediterranean climate (Köppen climate classification: Csb).

Climate data for Strathalbyn, elevation 58 m (190 ft), (1996–2025 normals and extremes)
Month	Jan	Feb	Mar	Apr	May	Jun	Jul	Aug	Sep	Oct	Nov	Dec	Year
Record high °C (°F)	46.7 (116.1)	44.3 (111.7)	41.6 (106.9)	37.5 (99.5)	30.5 (86.9)	26.7 (80.1)	23.9 (75.0)	29.1 (84.4)	31.4 (88.5)	37.6 (99.7)	43.1 (109.6)	45.9 (114.6)	46.7 (116.1)
Mean daily maximum °C (°F)	28.0 (82.4)	27.4 (81.3)	25.4 (77.7)	22.4 (72.3)	18.5 (65.3)	15.8 (60.4)	15.1 (59.2)	16.2 (61.2)	18.7 (65.7)	21.6 (70.9)	24.4 (75.9)	26.2 (79.2)	21.6 (70.9)
Mean daily minimum °C (°F)	14.8 (58.6)	14.5 (58.1)	12.9 (55.2)	10.6 (51.1)	9.1 (48.4)	7.4 (45.3)	6.6 (43.9)	6.7 (44.1)	7.6 (45.7)	8.9 (48.0)	11.4 (52.5)	13.0 (55.4)	10.3 (50.5)
Record low °C (°F)	6.6 (43.9)	5.3 (41.5)	5.1 (41.2)	0.7 (33.3)	−0.4 (31.3)	−1.5 (29.3)	−1.6 (29.1)	−0.9 (30.4)	−0.2 (31.6)	1.2 (34.2)	1.7 (35.1)	5.8 (42.4)	−1.6 (29.1)
Average precipitation mm (inches)	18.8 (0.74)	19.9 (0.78)	16.8 (0.66)	27.0 (1.06)	44.4 (1.75)	53.9 (2.12)	54.4 (2.14)	51.7 (2.04)	45.6 (1.80)	34.0 (1.34)	28.9 (1.14)	23.3 (0.92)	419.4 (16.51)
Average precipitation days (≥ 0.2 mm)	5.3	5.2	6.7	9.5	14.3	15.7	17.3	16.1	13.7	10.7	8.3	7.8	130.6
Average afternoon relative humidity (%)	41	43	44	47	57	63	64	58	57	48	42	41	50
Source: Australian Bureau of Meteorology (humidity 1996–2010)

== Economy ==
=== Mining ===
Small lead, zinc, gold and copper mines operated in the area in the later part of the 19th century. These have all been long closed, and did not have a significant effect on the development of the town.

In 2008, mining company Terramin Australia Ltd established an underground zinc mine situated in a quarry east of the town, injecting an estimated $29 million into the local economy and creating around 100 jobs. The mine was expected to yield zinc and lead, with small quantities of silver, gold and copper, and operate for seven years. This proposal was opposed by "The Residents for a Future Strathalbyn Inc." who were concerned about ecologically unsustainable development within their district.

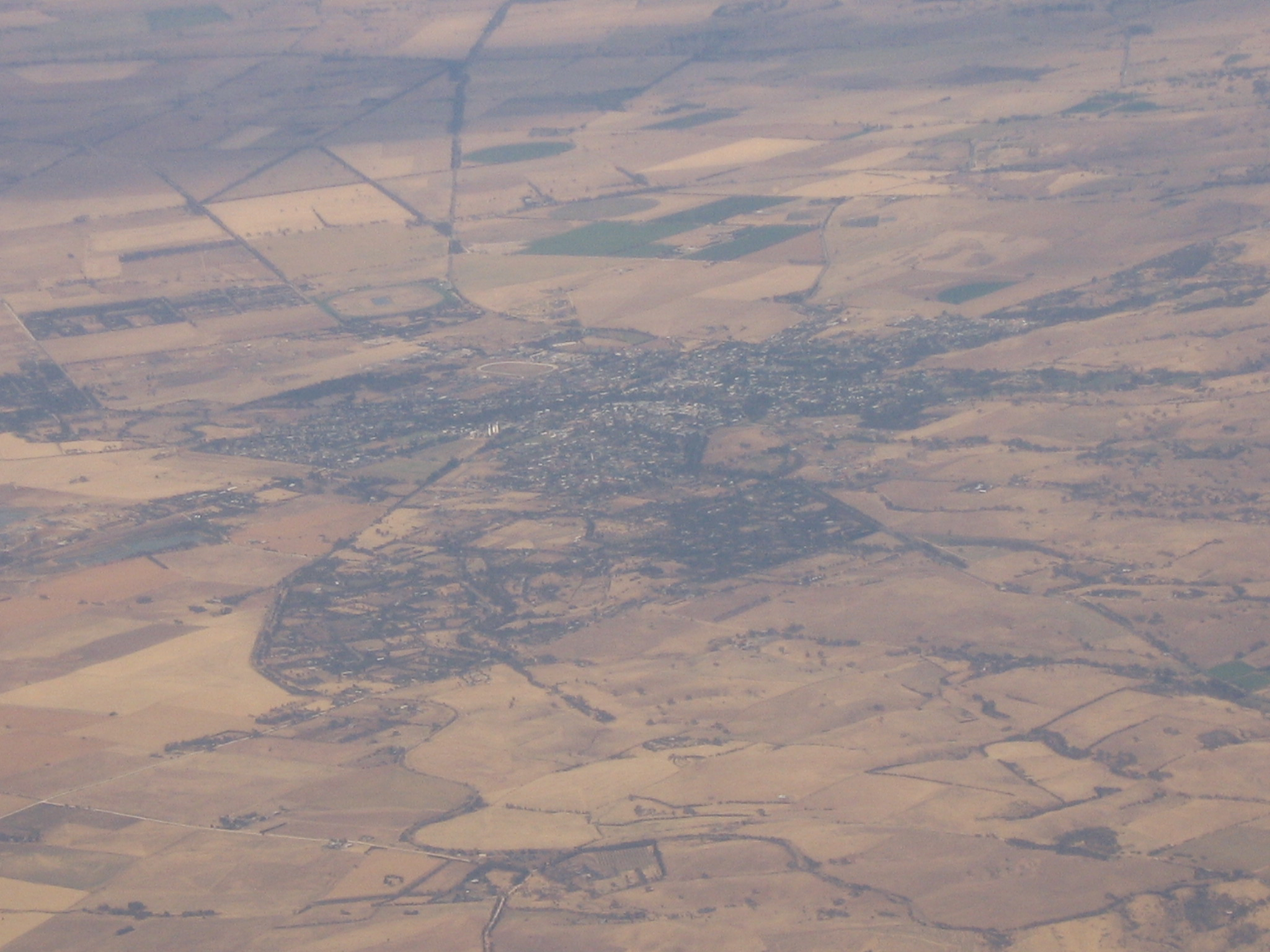
An aerial photograph of Strathalbyn, looking south, 2008

The mine stopped operating in October 2013 due to low metal prices and the economic ore reserve running out. The closure resulted in over 100 jobs being lost to the town. It is possible that the zinc mine will reopen to extract more ore if the sale price increases. A 5MW/10MWh Compressed air energy storage demonstration project is scheduled for the mine.

=== Tourism ===
Tourism is identified as a key industry driving the Alexandrina economy, with Strathalbyn playing a major role due to its historic architecture, village atmosphere, and proximity to the Langhorne Creek wine region.

== Culture and facilities ==
Strathalbyn has four pubs in the centre of town, The Victoria, The Robin Hood, The Terminus, and the Commercial. It is host to an annual collectors, hobbies and antique fair, held the third weekend of August every year. Other popular events are the Strathalbyn Rotary Club's renowned Duck Race, the Strathalbyn Show, and the collaborative Street Parade and Carols by Candlelight. There is a Sunday market, held once per month at Gilbert's Motor Museum on High Street.

In 1975, street scenes from the film Picnic at Hanging Rock were filmed in the town.

The Children's Bridge is a pedestrian bridge over the river in the park.

The Good Shepherd Catholic Church is part of the Mount Barker - Strathalbyn Catholic Parish.

=== Heritage List ===
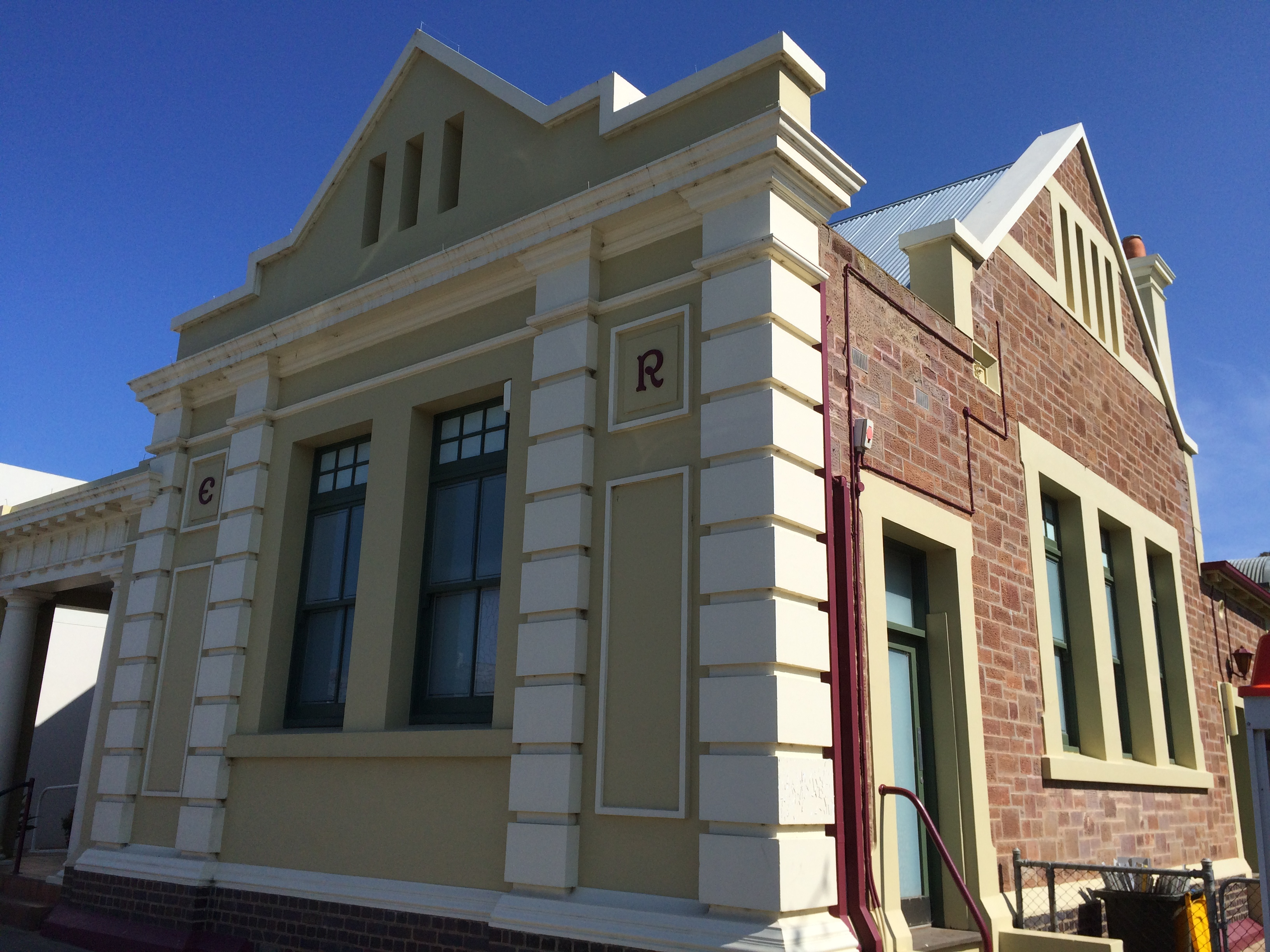
Strathalbyn Post Office

The Strathalbyn Post Office was entered in the Commonwealth Heritage List in 2004. The Strathalbyn Post Office, constructed in 1911–1912, is historically important for its association with the development of the township of Strathalbyn. It is an example of an Edwardian Baroque and Arts and Crafts movement hybrid, applied to a public building in the 'Commonwealth' style.

== Notable people ==
- Edward Charles Stirling (1848–1919), Australian anthropologist born in Strathalbyn
