= Electoral district of Burra =

Former South Australian electoral district

Coordinates: 33°12′19″S 138°36′7″E

Burra South Australia—House of Assembly
- State: South Australia
- Created: 1875
- Abolished: 1970
- Namesake: Burra, South Australia
- Demographic: Rural

Burra was an electoral district of the House of Assembly in the Australian state of South Australia from 1875 to 1902, and again from 1938 to 1970.

After a boundary redistribution in 1902, it was replaced by Electoral district of Burra Burra. When it was recreated in 1938, the polling booths were: Aberdeen (later north Burra), Andrews, Belalie North, Black Springs, Booborowie, Bright, Canowie Belt, Emu Downs, Farrell's Flat, Hallett, Hanson, Jamestown, Kooringa, Leighton, Mannanarie, Mongolata Goldfields, Mount Bryan, Mount Bryan East, Spalding, Washpool, Willalo, World's End.

The town of Burra is currently located in the seat of Stuart.

== Members ==
First incarnation (1875–1902)
Member	Party	Term	Member	Party	Term
Ben Rounsevell		1875–1890	Rowland Rees		1875–1881
Ben Rounsevell		1875–1890	Ebenezer Ward		1881–1884
Ben Rounsevell		1875–1890	John Cockburn		1884–1887
Ben Rounsevell		1875–1890	Frederick Holder		1887–1901
George Lake		1890–1896	Frederick Holder		1887–1901
Charles Goode	National League	1896–1899	Frederick Holder		1887–1901
Ben Rounsevell	National League	1899–1902	Frederick Holder		1887–1901
Ben Rounsevell	National League	1899–1902	William Russell	Labor	1901–1902

Second incarnation (1938–1970)
Member	Party	Term
Archibald McDonald	Liberal and Country	1938–1947
George Hawker	Liberal and Country	1947–1956
Percy Quirke	Independent	1956–1963
Percy Quirke	Liberal and Country	1963–1968
Ernest Allen	Liberal and Country	1968–1970
