= Caroona Creek Conservation Park =

Protected area in South Australia

- IUCN category VI (protected area with sustainable use of natural resources)
- Location within South Australia
- Location: South Australia
- Nearest city: Hallett
- Coordinates: 33°25′32″S 139°06′22″E
- Area: 54.22 km^{2} (20.93 sq mi)
- Established: 18 February 2010
- Governing body: Department for Environment and Water

Caroona Creek Conservation Park is a protected area located in the Australian state of South Australia in the localities of Collinsville and Mount Bryan East about 173 kilometres (107 mi) north-east of the state capital of Adelaide and about 19 kilometres (12 mi) east of the town of Hallett.

It came into existence on 18 February 2010 by proclamation under the National Parks and Wildlife Act 1972. Its name which is derived from the Caroona Creek, a stream flowing within its boundaries, was approved by the Surveyor General of South Australia on 14 June 2005. Additional land was added to the conservation park on 16 October 2014. As of 2016, it covered an area of 54.22 square kilometres (20.93 sq mi).

A separate proclamation on 18 February 2010 ensured the continuation of “existing rights of entry, prospecting, exploration or mining” regarding the land under the Mining Act 1971 and the Petroleum and Geothermal Energy Act 2000.

The conservation park consisted of the following land in the cadastral unit of the Hundred of Tomkinson at proclamation in 2010:

1. Sections 49, 56 to 65, 107 to 109, 112 to 113, 115 to 123, 174 to 176, 313 to 316, 324 and 325.
2. Allotments 100 and 101 of Deposited Plan 68352.
3. Allotment 1 of Deposited Plan 58696.

Land added in 2014 consisted of sections 53, 54 and 55 in the Hundred of Tomkinson, and sections 56, 191 and 538 in the Hundred of Hallett.

The Heysen Trail, the long-distance walking trail, passes through the conservation park as a loop entering from the south and exiting in the west.

In 2011, it was described by its managing authority as follows:

Situated on the western edge of the Olary Plain, this park contains a range of landforms from steep rocky ridges and calcrete hills extending to alluvial plains. The park conserves a representative sample of the transitional zone between the rounded hills of the Mid North to the beginning of the rocky gorge country of the Flinders Ranges. The northern area contains the beautiful Tourilie Gorge and its surrounding rugged hilly terrain.

The conservation park is classified as an IUCN Category VI protected area.

== See also ==
- Protected areas of South Australia
