= Hundred of Terowie =

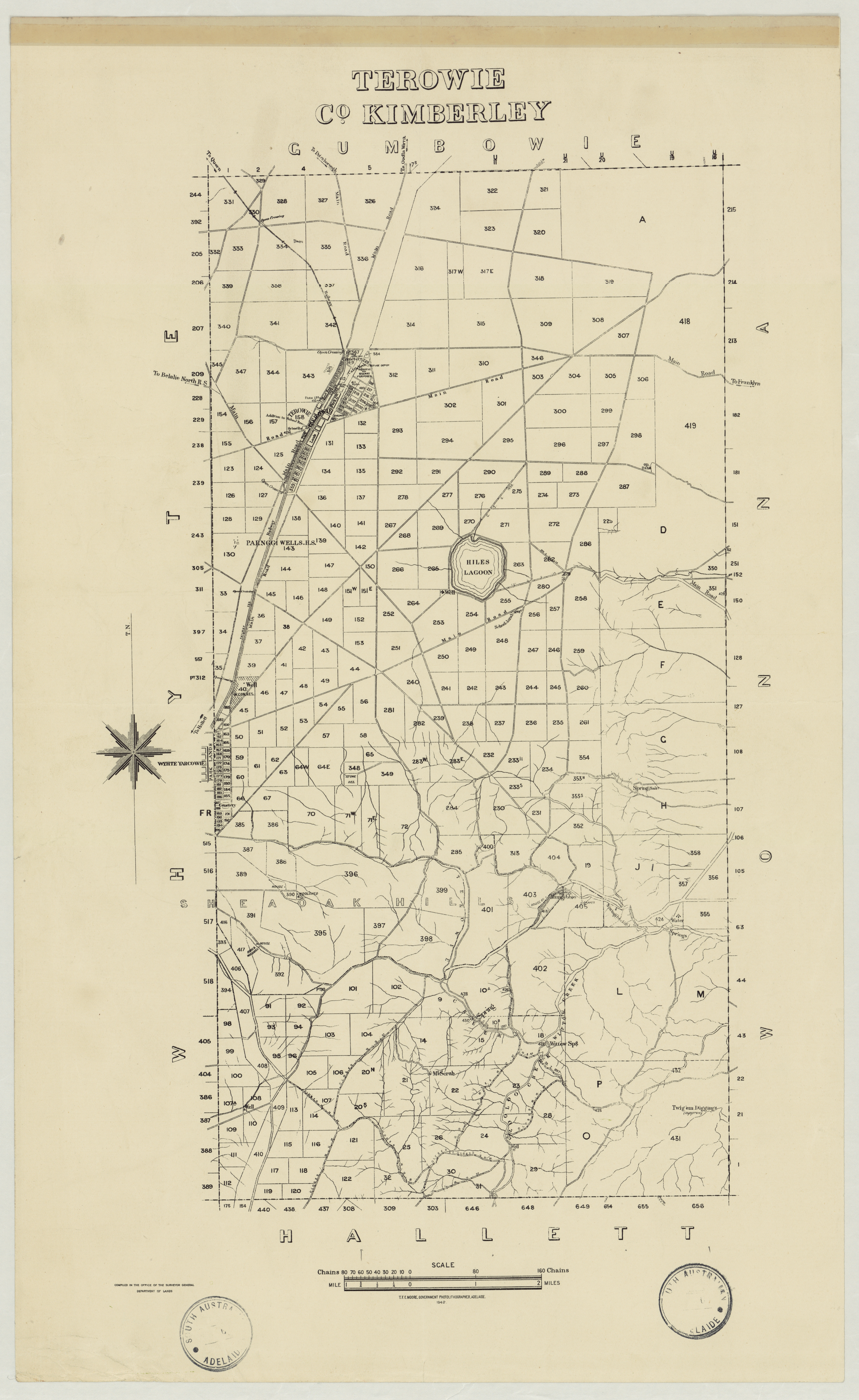
Plan of Hundred of Terowie, 1942

The Hundred of Terowie is a cadastral hundred of South Australia centred on the town of Terowie, South Australia.

Terowie is an Aboriginal word meaning hidden waterhole first applied to Terowie Creek.

It was here the Douglas Macarthur first used the term "I shall return".

== Townships ==
The town of Terowie is in the northern part of the hundred. The town of Whyte Yarcowie, known simply as Yarcowie before 1929, straddles the western boundary with the Hundred of Whyte. Land was first released for closer settlement in the Yarcowie district in 1872.

== Local government ==
The District Council of Terowie was established in 1888 bringing local government to the hundreds of Terowie, Ketchowla and Wonna.

In 1935, Terowie council was abolished at the council area became part of the adjacent District Council of Hallett.

When Hallett council was abolished in 1997, the lands became part of the much larger Regional Council of Goyder.
