= Terowie =

Terowie may refer to:

- Terowie, South Australia, a town and locality
- Terowie railway line, a closed railway line in South Australia
  - Terowie railway station, a closed railway station
- District Council of Terowie, a former local government area in South Australia
- Hundred of Terowie, a cadastral unit in South Australia
