= Hundred of Gumbowie =

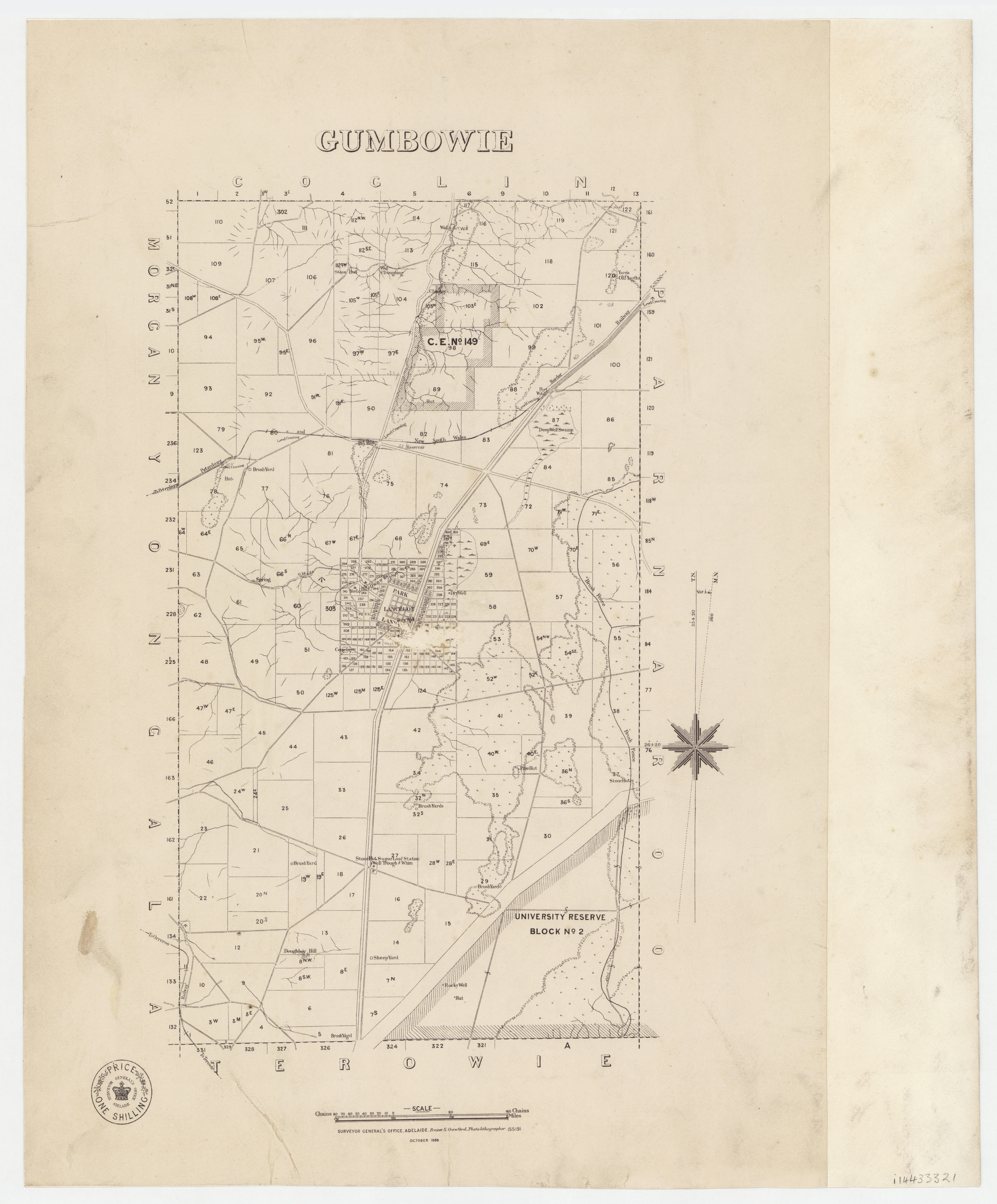
File:Hundred of Gumbowie, 1889

The Hundred of Gumbowie is a hundred of the County of Kimberley, in South Australia.

The demand for agricultural land led to the surveying of the hundred of Gumbowie, north of Adelaide, where the ghost town of Lancelot is now located.

The climate is semi arid.
