= Pandappa Conservation Park =

Protected area in South Australia

- IUCN category III (natural monument or feature)
- Location within South Australia
- Location: South Australia
- Nearest city: Peterborough
- Coordinates: 33°10′55″S 139°08′36″E
- Area: 10.51 km^{2} (4.06 sq mi)
- Established: 20 December 1973
- Visitors: "low" (in 1994)
- Governing body: Department for Environment and Water

Pandappa Conservation Park is a protected area located in the Australian state of South Australia in the locality of Franklyn about 200 kilometres (120 mi) north-east of the state capital of Adelaide and about 40 kilometres (25 mi) south-east of the town of Peterborough.

The conservation park consists of land in Sections 68, 69 and 189 in the cadastral unit of the Hundred of Wonna. It located within an area which has been largely cleared for agricultural purposes and adjoined on its north, north-east and eastern side by a road arriving from Terowie in the west. It was proclaimed on 20 December 1973 under the National Parks and Wildlife Act 1972. As of 2018, it covered an area of 8.91 square kilometres (3.44 sq mi).

In 1980, the conservation park was described as follows:

Pandappa Conservation Park preserves an area representative of the semi-arid mallee associations occurring in the region. A diversity of arid and semi-arid bird species has been recorded from the Park… The Park consists of an area of low quartzite ridges and associated foot slopes. The vegetation is dominated by an open scrub of mature Eucalyptus socialis over Enchylaena tomentosa and Kochia spp. A tall shrubland of Eremophila, Dodonaea, Acacia and Cassia species occurs on the rocky hills of the Wonna Range. Open grazed areas feature numerous introduced species many of which also occur in the mallee understory… The park has had a history of grazing and as a result some introduced species are prevalent.

As of 1994, visitation was described as being “low” due to its location on “a relatively minor road”.

The conservation park is classified as an IUCN Category III protected area. In 1980, it was listed on the now-defunct Register of the National Estate.

== See also ==
- Protected areas of South Australia
