= County of Kimberley =

Kimberley
- Cadastral division
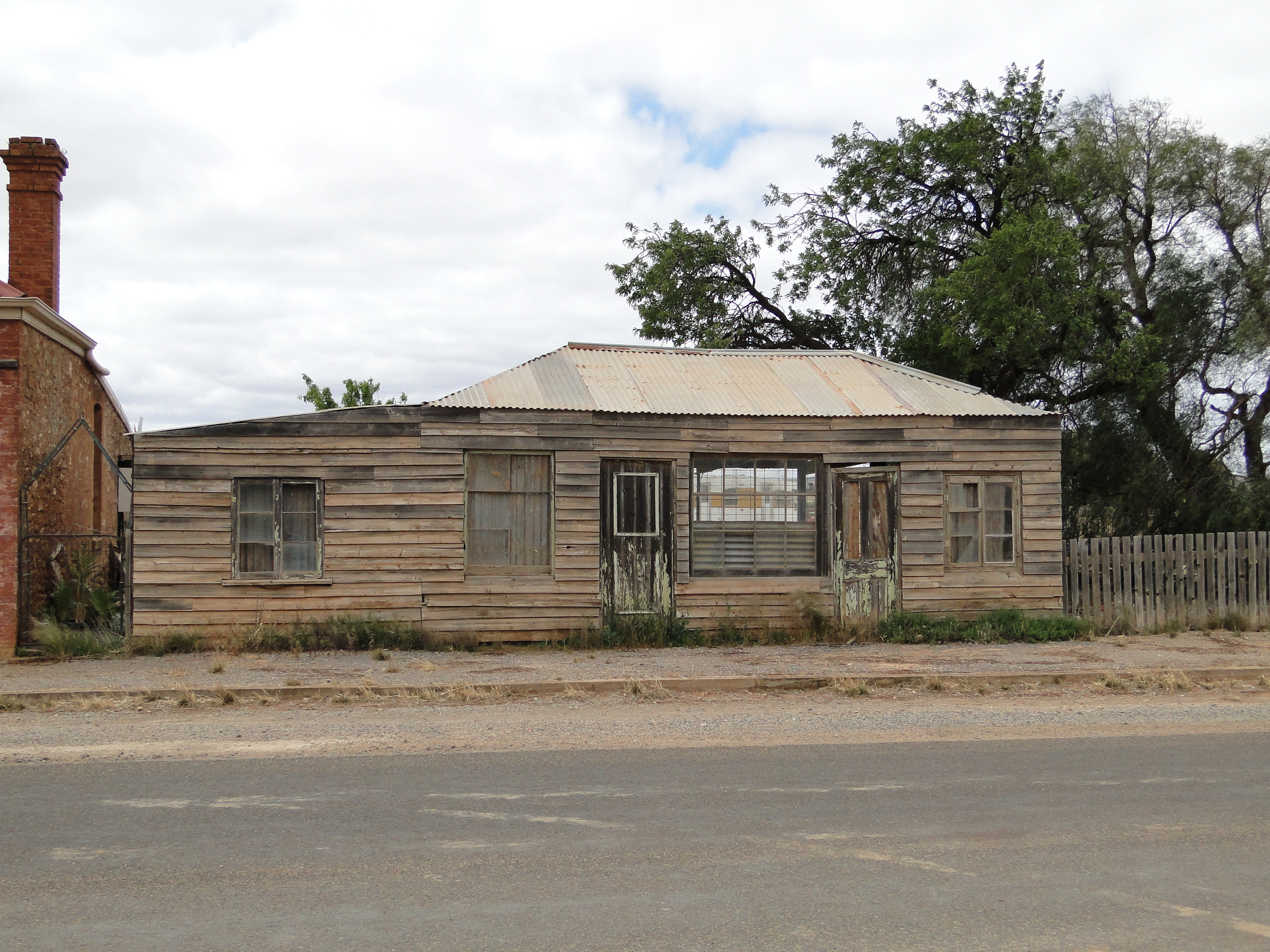
- An old weatherboard shop in Terowie in the Hundred of Terowie

- Coordinates: 33°05′33″S 139°17′54″E
- Country: Australia
- State: South Australia
- Region: Far North; Yorke and Mid North
- LGA: District Council of Peterborough Regional Council of Goyder Pastoral Unincorporated Area
- Location: 45 km (28 mi) E of Peterborough
- Established: 20 July 1871

Area
  - Total: 3,590 km^{2} (1,388 sq mi)
Lands administrative divisions around Kimberley
Dalhousie	Herbert	-
Dalhousie; Victoria	Kimberley	-
Victoria	Burra	Young
- Location; Adjoining counties

County of Kimberley is a cadastral unit located in the Australian state of South Australia that covers land to the east of the Flinders Ranges about 45 kilometres (28 mi) east of the town of Peterborough. It was proclaimed in 1871 and named after John Wodehouse, 1st Earl of Kimberley, a British Secretary of State for the Colonies. It has been partially divided in the following sub-units of hundreds – Gumbowie, Hardy, Ketchowla, Parnaroo, Terowie and Wonna.

== Description ==
The County of Kimberley extends from the east side of the Flinders Ranges for a distance of about 76 kilometres (47 mi) from its western boundary and for about 48 kilometres (30 mi) from its northern boundary. It is bounded by the following counties - Herbert to the north, Burra to the south, Dalhousie to the west and north-west, Victoria to the west and the south-west, and Young to the south-east.

The county's sole town is Terowie which is located in its south-western corner.

The county is served by one principal roads, the Barrier Highway which passes through the county in a north-south direction from the town of Whyte Yarcowie in the south entering via the Hundred of Terowie and exiting via the Hundred of Parnaroo on its way to the town centre in Oodla Wirra in the north.

The Crystal Brook-Broken Hill railway line passes through the county in an easterly direction passing from Peterborough in the west entering via the Hundred of Gumbowie and exiting via the north side of the Hundred of Hardy in the east and then onward to Yunta.

The county is located both within the local government areas of the District Council of Peterborough which occupies the county's north-west corner and the Regional Council of Goyder which occupies the county's south-west corner, and the state's Pastoral Unincorporated Area which occupies the county's eastern half.

Land use within the part of the county located within the District Council of Peterborough is ’primary production’ and is concerned with “agricultural production and the grazing of stock on relatively large holdings.” Land use within the part located in the 'Pastoral Unincorporated Area' is concerned with primary industry with pastoralism being the dominant activity. Land use within the part of the county located within the Regional Council of Goyder is ’primary production’ and most of the land is only suitable for grazing due to low rainfall as evident by the location of Goyder's Line within the council area.

The county includes the following protected areas within its extent – the Pandappa Conservation Park in the hundred of Wonna and the Pualco Range Conservation Park in its north-east corner.

== History ==
The County of Kimberley was proclaimed on 20 July 1871 and is named after John Wodehouse, 1st Earl of Kimberley who was the British Secretary of State for the Colonies from 6 July 1870 to 17 February 1874.

The following hundreds have been proclaimed within the county - Terowie in 1871, Gumbowie in 1877, Parnaroo and Wonna in 1878, and Hardy and Ketchowla in 1880.

The hundreds of Gumbowie, Hardy, and Parnaroo formed part of the land area gazetted on 5 January 1888 as the District Council of Coglin under the District Councils Act 1887 and have been part of the District Council of Peterborough since 1 May 1935. The hundreds of Terowie, Wonna and Ketchowla formed the land area gazetted as the District Council of Terowie on the same day under the same act and were added to the District Council of Hallett on 21 March 1935 and have been part of the Regional Council of Goyder since 23 January 1997.

== Constituent hundreds ==
=== Location of hundreds ===
The hundreds are laid out from west to east from the boundary with the Counties of Dalhousie and Victoria in two rows as follows:

- the northern row consisting of Gumbowie, Parnaroo and Hardy,
- the southern row consisting of Terowie, Wonna and Ketchowla.

The total area of the hundreds accounts for 2,060 square kilometres (797 mi^{2}) out of the county's total area of 3,590 square kilometres (1,388 mi^{2}) or 57.4% of the county's area.

=== Hundred of Gumbowie ===
The Hundred of Gumbowie (32°56′40″S 138°56′35″E) was proclaimed on 18 January 1877. It covers an area of 290 square kilometres (111 mi^{2}) and its name is derived from an Aboriginal word “having reference to water.” The site of the ceased government town of Lancelot is located within the hundred. Its extent is fully occupied by the locality of Ucolta.

=== Hundred of Hardy ===
The Hundred of Hardy (32°59′26″S 139°15′55″E) was proclaimed on 5 August 1880. It covers an area of 370 square kilometres (143 mi^{2}) and was named after Arthur Hardy, a member of the South Australian Parliament at the time. Its extent is fully occupied by the locality of Hardy.

=== Hundred of Ketchowla ===
The Hundred of Ketchowla (33°12′47″S 139°16′15″E) was proclaimed on 5 August 1880. . It covers an area of 410 square kilometres (157 mi^{2}) and its name is derived from an Aboriginal name whose meaning is not known. Its extent is fully occupied by the locality of Pine Creek.

=== Hundred of Parnaroo ===
The Hundred of Parnaroo (32°59′22″S 139°06′03″E) was proclaimed on 31 October 1878. It covers an area of 330 square kilometres (127 mi^{2}) and its name is derived from an Aboriginal word meaning “rain of little stones.” Its extent is fully occupied by the locality of Parnaroo.

=== Hundred of Terowie ===
The Hundred of Terowie (33°12′26″S 138°57′28″E) was proclaimed on 20 July 1871. It covers an area of 310 square kilometres (120 mi^{2}) and its name is derived from an Aboriginal word meaning “hidden waterhole”. Its extent is occupied in its north by the locality of Terowie which includes the town of the same name while its south is occupied by the eastern part of Whyte Yarcowie in the west, the northern part of Ulooloo in the south and by the western part of Wonna in the east.

=== Hundred of Wonna ===
The Hundred of Wonna (33°12′56″S 139°06′06″E) was proclaimed on 31 October 1878. It covers an area of 360 square kilometres (139 mi^{2}). One source reports that its name is derived from an Aboriginal word meaning “emu” while another reports that is derived from a word meaning “two”. The sites of the ceased government towns of Franklyn and Mallett are located within the hundred. Its extent is occupied by the locality of Franklyn in the north while its south part is occupied by the eastern side of the locality of Wonna.

=== Gallery ===
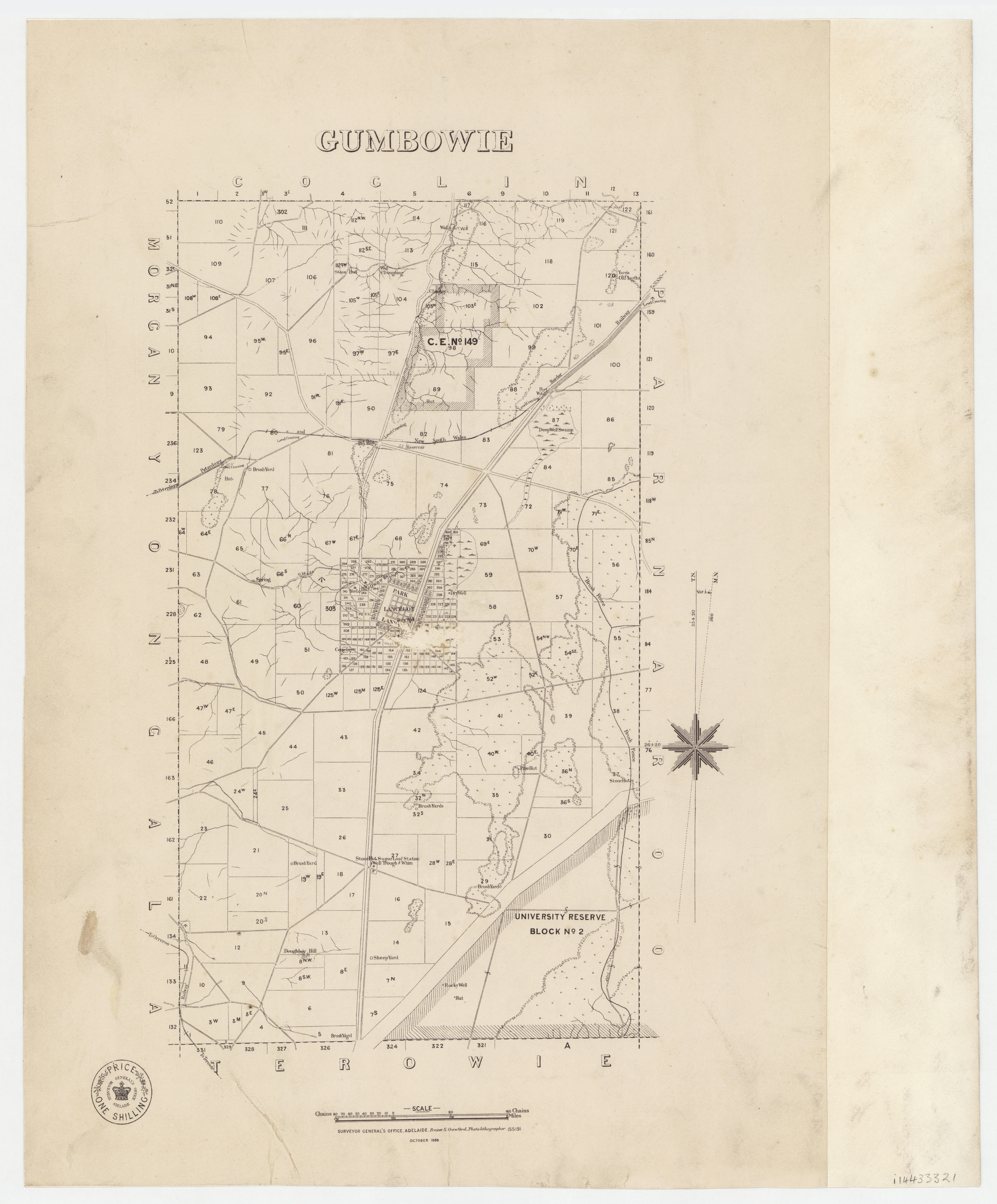
Hundred of Gumbowie, 1889

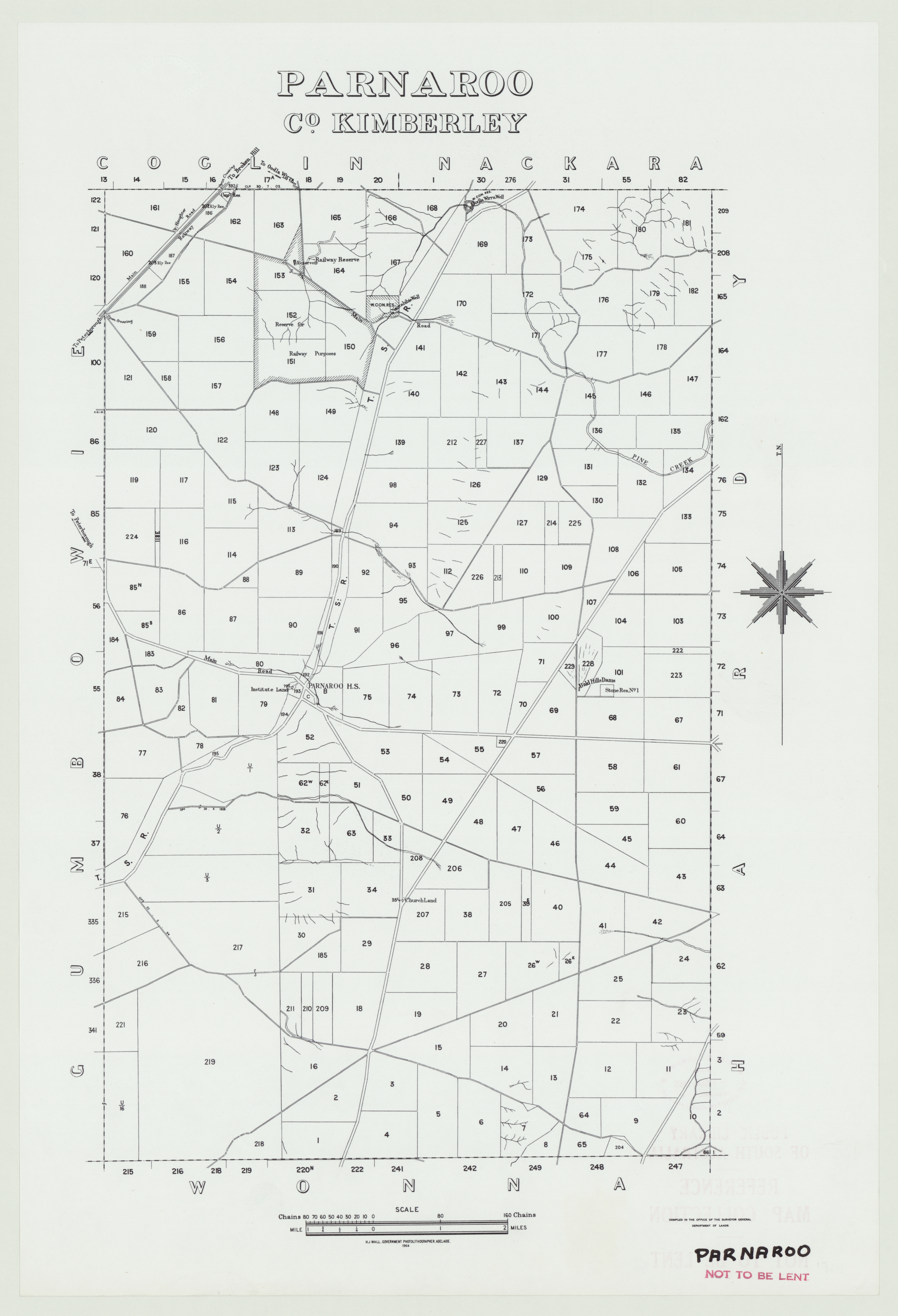
Hundred of Parnaroo, 1964

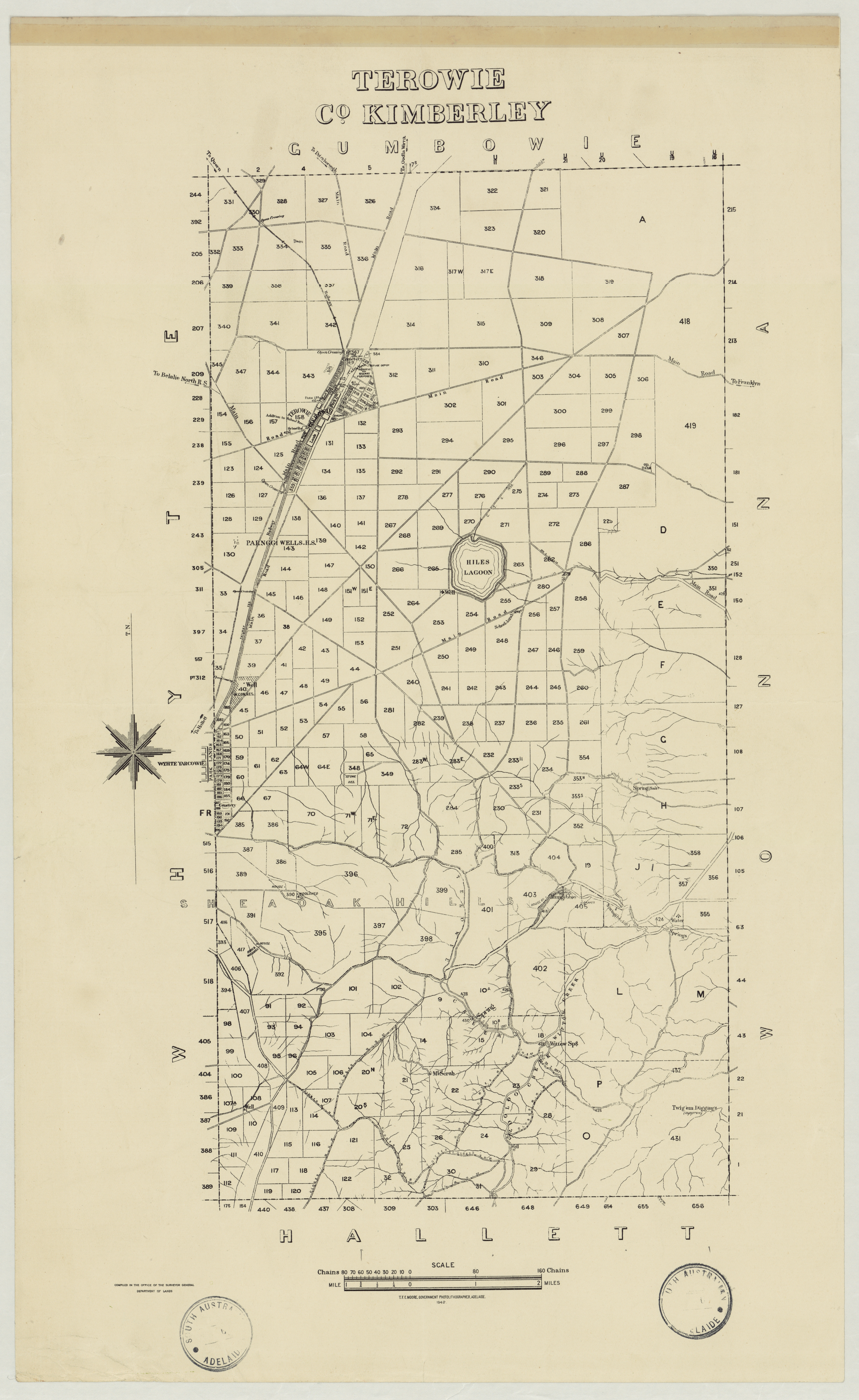
Hundred of Terowie, 1942

== See also ==
- Lands administrative divisions of South Australia
- Yongala, South Australia#Geography and climate, the nearest weather station
