= Pine Creek, South Australia =

Pine Creek
- Town
- Coordinates: 33°10′S 139°17′E
- Country: Australia
- State: South Australia
- Region: Yorke and Mid North
- LGA(s): Regional Council of Goyder

Government
  - State electorate(s): Stuart
  - Federal division(s): Grey

Population
  - Total(s): 0 (SAL 2016)
- Postcode: 5419
- County: Kimberley
Localities around Pine Creek
Parnaroo	Hardy	Warnes
Franklyn; Wonna	Pine Creek	Warnes
Collinsville	Collinsville	Warnes

Pine Creek is a rural locality in the Mid North region of South Australia, situated in the Regional Council of Goyder. It was established in August 2000 when boundaries were formalised for the long established local name.

Ketchowla
- Cadastral division
- Country: Australia
- State: South Australia
- Established: 5 August 1880

Area
  - Total: 410 km^{2} (157 sq mi)

Population
  - Total(s): 0 (SAL 2016)
- County: Kimberley
Lands administrative divisions around Ketchowla
Parnaroo	Hardy
Wonna	Ketchowla
Tomkinson	Tomkinson

The Hundred of Ketchowla is a cadastral unit of hundred, the boundaries of which are exactly contiguous with the locality of Pine Creek. The hundred was proclaimed by Governor William Jervois on 5 August 1880, named for an Aboriginal name of unknown origin.

Ketchowla Station is named after the hundred and the station's homestead is located within Pine Creek. A post office at Ketchowla opened circa 1872 and closed on 30 November 1917. The Ketchowla Woolshed, Old Homestead and Outbuildings are listed on the South Australian Heritage Register.

Note that there are several creeks in South Australia called Pine Creek, including a tributary that joins the River Wakefield at Undalya and forms part of the boundary between the Hundred of Upper Wakefield and the Hundred of Saddleworth.

== See also ==
- Pine Creek (disambiguation)
