= County of Burra =

Burra
- Cadastral division
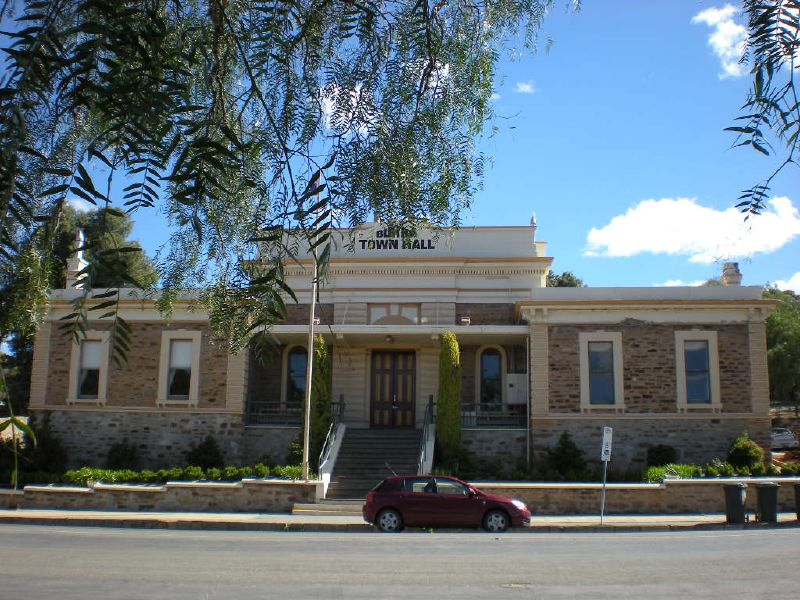
- Burra Town Hall in the Hundred of Kooringa

- Coordinates: 33.63°S 139.30°E
- Country: Australia
- State: South Australia
- Region: Murray and Mallee; Yorke and Mid North
- LGA: Mid Murray Council Regional Council of Goyder Unincorporated area
- Established: 1851

Area
  - Total: 5,400 km^{2} (2,080 sq mi)
Lands administrative divisions around Burra
Victoria	Kimberley
Victoria; Stanley	Burra	Young
Light	Light; Eyre	Young
- Coordinates; Adjoining counties

County of Burra is a cadastral unit located in the Australian state of South Australia which covers land located in the state’s east associated with the town of Burra. It was proclaimed in 1851 by Governor Young and named after the town of Burra.

== Description ==
The County of Burra covers part of South Australia to the east of the northern end of the Mount Lofty Ranges and to the north-west of the ‘great bend’ in the Murray River and with the town of Burra being located midway along its western boundary.

== History ==
The County of Burra was proclaimed by Henry Edward Fox Young, the fifth Governor of South Australia on 7 August 1851. The county was named after the then government town of Burra. The following thirteen hundreds were proclaimed within the County between the years 1851 and 1881- Apoinga in 1851, Baldina in 1875, Bright in 1875, Bundey in 1878, Hallett in 1860, King in 1878, Kingston in 1860, Kooringa in 1851, Lindley in 1881, Maude under the name of Schomburgk in 1880, Mongolata in 1875, Rees in 1879, and Tomkinson in 1879.

== Constituent hundreds ==
=== Description of layout of the hundreds ===
The hundreds located within the County of Burra are laid out in four rows (from north to south) as follows:

- the first row (from west to east) - Hallett and Tomkinson,
- the second row - Kingston, Mongolata and Rees,
- the three row - Kooringa, Baldina and King,
- the fourth row - Apoinga, Bright, Bundey, Maude and Lindley.

=== Hundred of Apoinga ===
The Hundred of Apoinga (33°53′16″S 138°58′37″E) was proclaimed by Governor Young on 7 August 1851. It covers an area of 240 square kilometres (91 mi^{2}) and its name is considered to be “corruption of ‘appinga’” which is the name of the Aboriginal tribe “which inhabited the area.”. The Hundred of Apoinga includes the localities of Apoinga, Koonoona, Emu Downs, the southern part of Burra, northern part of Brady Creek and the Emu Flats northwestern corner of Robertstown.

=== Hundred of Baldina ===
The Hundred of Baldina (33°43′04″S 139°06′15″E) was proclaimed by Governor Musgrave on 30 December 1875. It covers an area of 240 square kilometres (93 mi^{2}). It includes the locality of Baldina, the northern half of the locality of Worlds End and the a section of the locality of Burra Eastern Districts.

=== Hundred of Bright ===
The Hundred of Bright (33°52′49″S 139°06′43″E) was proclaimed by Governor Musgrave on 17 June 1875. It covers an area of 240 square kilometres (93 mi^{2}) and was named after Henry Edward Bright, a South Australian politician. It includes the locality of Bright, the southern half of the locality of Worlds End, the north-western part of the locality of Robertstown and the north-western corner of the locality of Geranium Plains.

=== Hundred of Bundey ===
The Hundred of Bundey (33°53′18″S 139°16′16″E) was proclaimed on 21 November 1878. It covers an area of 310 square kilometres (118 mi^{2}) and was named after William Henry Bundey, a South Australian politician. It includes the locality of Bundey and the north-eastern corner of the locality of Geranium Plains.

=== Hundred of Hallett ===
The Hundred of Hallett (33°24′05″S 138°57′47″E) was proclaimed by Governor MacDonnell on 23 February 1860. It covers an area of 350 square kilometres (135 mi^{2}) and is reported as being either named after a pastoralist, Alfred Hallett of Wandilla Station, or after John Hallett, a South Australian politician. It includes the majority of the localities of Hallett and Mount Bryan East, the southern part of the locality of Ulooloo and the north-western corner of the locality of Collinsville.

=== Hundred of King ===
The Hundred of King (33°43′28″S 139°15′45″E) was proclaimed by Governor Jervois on 31 October 1878. It covers an area of 310 square kilometres (118 mi^{2}) and was named after Thomas King, a South Australian politician. It is entirely contained within the modern locality of Burra Eastern Districts.

=== Hundred of Kingston ===
The Hundred of Kingston (33°32′50″S 138°56′46″E) was proclaimed by Governor MacDonnell on 23 February 1860. It covers an area of 230 square kilometres (87 mi^{2}) and was named after George Strickland Kingston, a South Australian politician. It includes the locality of Mount Bryan, the south-western part of the locality of Mount Bryan East and much of the north-eastern part of the locality of Burra.

=== Hundred of Kooringa ===
The Hundred of Kooringa (33°42′42″S 138°57′38″E) was proclaimed by Governor Young on 3 March 1881 7/08/1851. It covers an area of 250 square kilometres (98 mi^{2}) and its name is reported as being derived from the Aboriginal name for land on which the government town of Burra was located. It includes the central part of the modern locality of Burra and the south-western tip of the locality of Mount Bryan.

=== Hundred of Lindley ===
The Hundred of Lindley (33°53′13″S 139°36′47″E) was proclaimed by Governor Jervois on 3 March 1881. It covers an area of 300 square kilometres (115 mi^{2}) and was named after John Lindley, an English botanist and horticulturalist. It shares exactly the same boundaries as the modern locality of Lindley.

=== Hundred of Maude ===
The Hundred of Maude (33°53′08″S 139°26′33″E) which was originally proclaimed as the Hundred of Schomburgk (German: [ˈʃɔmbʊʁk]) on 16 December 1880, covers an area of 300 square kilometres (115 mi^{2}). The original naming was to honour Moritz Richard Schomburgk, a director of the Adelaide Botanic Gardens. It was one of places to be renamed during World War I as it was "of enemy origin". The Hundred of Koerabko was first proposed as a replacement name but was not accepted without a reason being given. It finally named after Frederick Stanley Maude, a British general of World War I on 10 January 1918. A proposal submitted in 1983 to reinstate Schomburgk as the hundred’s name was not approved by the Geographical Names Board. It shares exactly the same boundaries as the modern locality of Maude.

=== Hundred of Mongolata ===
The Hundred of Mongolata (33°33′06″S 139°06′19″E) was proclaimed by Governor Musgrave on 30 December 1875. It covers an area of 240 square kilometres (93 mi^{2}) and its name is reported as being derived from an Aboriginal word. It includes the locality of Mongolata, a north-eastern part of the locality of Burra, the south-eastern part of the locality of Mount Bryan East and the north-western part of the locality of Burra Eastern Districts.

=== Hundred of Rees ===
The Hundred of Rees (33°33′24″S 139°16′00″E) was proclaimed by Governor Jervois on 18 September 1879. It covers an area of 260 square kilometres (101 mi^{2}) and was named after Rowland Rees, a South Australian politician. It is entirely contained within the modern locality of Burra Eastern Districts.

=== Hundred of Tomkinson ===
The Hundred of Tomkinson (33°24′08″S 139°12′51″E) was proclaimed by Governor Jervois on 18 September 1879. It covers an area of 430 square kilometres (167 mi^{2}) and was named after Samuel Tomkinson, a South Australian politician. It includes the vast majority of the locality of Collinsville and a small eastern part of the locality of Mount Bryan East.

== See also ==
- Lands administrative divisions of South Australia
- List of Australian place names changed from German names
