= Collinsville, South Australia =

Collinsville
- Town
- Coordinates: 33.3936°S 139.168090°E
- Country: Australia
- State: South Australia
- LGA: Regional Council of Goyder

Government
  - State electorate: Stuart
  - Federal division: Grey

Population
  - Total: 11 (SAL 2021)
- Postcode: 5418
Localities around Collinsville
Wonna	Pine Creek	Warnes
Mount Bryan East	Collinsville	Warnes
Mount Bryan East	Burra Eastern Districts	Warnes

Collinsville is a rural locality in the Mid North region of South Australia, situated in the Regional Council of Goyder. It was established in August 2000, when boundaries were formalised for the "long established local name". It has almost exactly the same boundaries as the cadastral Hundred of Tomkinson, with small variations on its western border.

According to the 2021 Census, Collinsville had a very low population, with the ABS reporting suppressed data due to the small number of residents.

The Hundred of Tomkinson was proclaimed on 18 September 1879 by Governor William Jervois, named after politician Samuel Tomkinson. Collinsville Post Office opened on 1 April 1896, named after the property of local grazier John Collins; it closed on 1 December 1917. The state Nomenclature Committee had recommended in 1916 that the post office be renamed 'Metiappa', an abridgement of 'Piltimetiappa', the Aboriginal name for a local creek and the name of another local station, but there is no record of this having occurred before the closure. The Collinsville property developed as a famous merino stud, and upon Collins' death, The Advertiser described his family firm as "among the best studmasters in Australia".

In 2014, the Collinsville pastoral holding was sold following a period in receivership, marking a change in ownership after nearly two decades under the Handbury family.

The historic Collinsville Homestead Complex and the Piltimittiappa Homestead are both listed on the South Australian Heritage Register.

Much of the Caroona Creek Conservation Park lies within Collinsville. The park was proclaimed in 2010 under the National Parks and Wildlife Act 1972 (SA).

== Land use ==
Collinsville is located within South Australia's Mid North region, which is characterized by large scale grain cropping and livestock grazing as dominant land uses.
