= Parnaroo, South Australia =

Coordinates: 32°58′48″S 139°09′14″E

Parnaroo South Australia
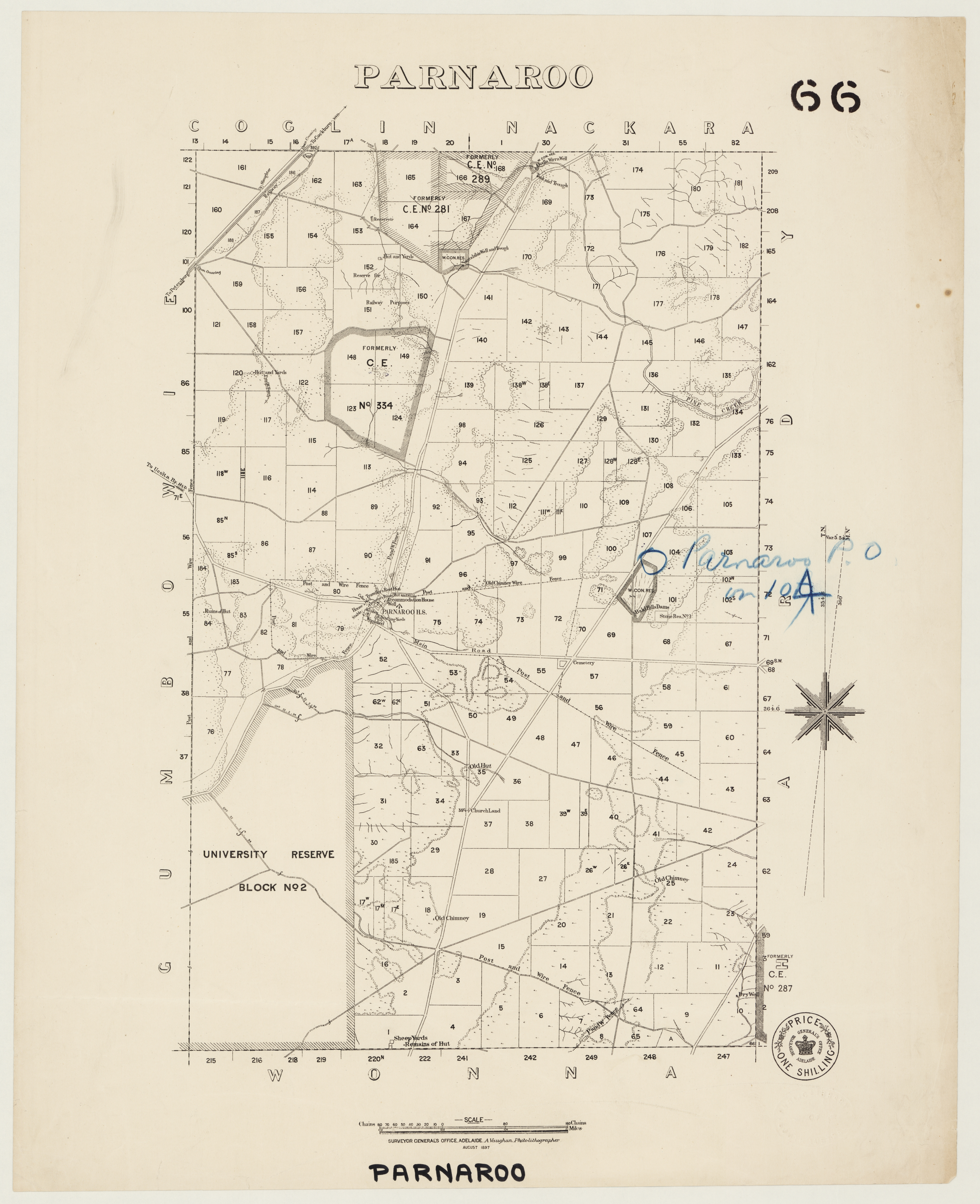
- Hundred of Parnaroo, 1897

- Population: 6 (SAL 2021)
- Postcode(s): 5422
- LGA(s): District Council of Peterborough
- Region: Yorke and Mid North
- County: Kimberley
- State electorate(s): Stuart
- Federal division(s): Grey
Localities around Parnaroo:
| Dawson | Oodla Wirra | Nackara |
| Ucolta | Parnaroo | Hardy |
| Terowie | Franklyn | Pine Creek |
- Footnotes: Adjoining localities

Parnaroo is a rural locality in South Australia, situated east of Peterborough. It shares the same boundaries as the cadastral Hundred of Parnaroo, which was established on 31 October 1878. It was reportedly named for an Aboriginal word meaning "rain of little stones", which had been taken from a sheep run opened in the area in 1854. The modern locality was formalised in August 2000, and named for the long established local name.

Originally the land of the Ngadjuri people, it was the site of a small settlement in the early days of British colonisation of the State, but the settlement never developed and is now in ruin. Farmers at Parnaroo reported major challenges in the 1880s due to the landscape and low rainfall, being north of Goyder's Line.

Parnaroo School operated from 1890 to 1930, while Parnaroo South School operated from 1895 until 1911. Parnaroo Post Office opened on 27 July 1871 and closed on 30 November 1916. The land is now private pastoral land.
