= John Whyte (pastoralist) =

John Whyte (1826 – 16 February 1902) was a pastoralist and businessman in the early years of South Australia. He was born in Kinross, Scotland. He was a partner with James Counsell in the grocery wholesaler and Murray paddle steamer firm Whyte, Counsell & Co. (until 1884) as well as owner of significant sheep runs. He married the widow Louisa Heath, a sister of James Counsell, on 18 May 1854.

== Early life ==
Whyte was born in Kinross in 1826. one of his schoolteachers was a nephew of Robert Burns, the Scottish poet, and schoolmates included Sir Henry Campbell-Bannerman who later became Prime Minister of Great Britain. He served an apprenticeship in Dunfermline as a draper and milliner then opened his own shop in Galway, Ireland. His brother William Whyte had migrated to the Victorian gold rush, and John Whyte migrated to Adelaide in 1853, his first employment being in Louisa Heath's drapery in Hindley Street, Adelaide.

== Whyte, Counsell & Co. ==
Whyte, Counsell & Co. were wholesale grocers and shipowners. James Counsell (Louisa Heath's brother), John and William Whyte established the grocery firm of Whyte, Counsell and Co. In 1864 they built a large building in Currie Street, Adelaide. They also owned several Murray River steamers which were loaded with goods from their warehouse and sold along the Murray-Darling river system.

Whyte withdrew from the partnership in 1884, taking a share of the paddle steamers and the Currie Street property.

== Pastoralist ==
While still a partner in Whyte, Counsell and Co, Whyte had also become involved as a pastoralist, taking up or purchasing several runs in the Murray Mallee region south of the Murray River. He also then purchased runs in the Mid North and Far North of South Australia. Some of the pastoral leases he acquired had previously been stocked with cattle, but Whyte restocked them with sheep.

In 1877, Whyte had held a total of 21 pastoral leases covering a total of 3,343 square miles (8,660 km^{2}) (not all at the same time). He grazed up to 61,783 sheep in addition to some cattle. The town of Whyte Yarcowie is named in part in honour of John Whyte.

== Paddle steamers ==
In 1890 he was owner of Decoy, Tolarno, Saddler and South Australian, and at the time of his death in 1902 he was the owner of Menindie and Saddler.
