= Hardy, South Australia =

Hardy South Australia
- Coordinates: 33°02′52″S 139°17′14″E
- Established: 31 August 2000
- Postcode(s): 5422
- Time zone: ACST (UTC+9:30)
  - Summer (DST): ACST (UTC+10:30)
- Location: 231 km (144 mi) N of Adelaide; 40 km (25 mi) E of Peterborough
- LGA(s): District Council of Peterborough
- Region: Yorke and Mid North
- County: Kimberley
- State electorate(s): Stuart
- Federal division(s): Grey
Mean max temp	Mean min temp	Annual rainfall
21.9 °C; 71 °F	7.3 °C; 45 °F	365.7 mm 14.4 in
Suburbs around Hardy:
Nackara	Nackara	Grampus
Parnaroo	Hardy	Warnes
Franklyn	Pine Creek	Warnes
- Footnotes: Locations; Adjoining localities

Hardy is a locality in the Australian state of South Australia located about 231 kilometres (144 mi) north of the state capital of Adelaide and about 40 kilometres (25 mi) east of the municipal seat in Peterborough.

Hardy’s boundaries were created on 31 August 2000 for the “local established name” which is derived from the cadastral unit of the Hundred of Hardy. On 26 April 2013, a portion on its eastern side was added to the new locality of Warnes with the result that all of its boundaries now align with those of the Hundred of Hardy.

Land use within the locality is ’primary production’ and is concerned with “agricultural production and the grazing of stock on relatively large holdings.”

Hardy is located within the federal division of Grey, the state electoral district of Stuart and the local government area of the District Council of Peterborough.
