= Burra Eastern Districts, South Australia =

Burra Eastern Districts South Australia
- Coordinates: 33.611860°S 139.296050°E
- Population: 7 (SAL 2021)
- Postcode(s): 5417
- LGA(s): Regional Council of Goyder
- State electorate(s): Stuart
- Federal division(s): Grey
Localities around Burra Eastern Districts:
Mount Bryan East	Collinsville	Warnes
Mongolata; Baldina	Burra Eastern Districts	Warnes
Worlds End	Bundey	Maude
- Footnotes: Coordinates

Burra Eastern Districts is a rural locality in the Mid North region of South Australia, situated in the Regional Council of Goyder. It was established in August 2000, when boundaries were formalised for the "long established local name".

It comprises the entirety of the cadastral Hundreds of Rees and King, as well as portions of the Hundreds of Baldina and Mongolata to their west. The area was progressively opened up for settlement in the 1870s, with the Hundreds of Baldina and Mongolata being proclaimed by Governor Anthony Musgrave in December 1875, the Hundred of Rees in October 1878, and the Hundred of King in September 1879.

It includes the Thistlebeds Station, which is home to the Burra Picnic Races. Thistlebeds once had its own post office and school, but these have long since closed.

The Baldina Cemetery is located in Burra Eastern Districts.
