= Willanowie Creek =

Coordinates: 32°58′45.1″S 138°58′27.5″E

Willanowie Creek is an intermittent and endorheic stream in the Australian state of South Australia that is located at 32°58'45.1"S 138°58'27.5"E, south of Ucolta. It is located about 530 metres (1,740 ft) above sea level.

The area is arid and the former town of Lancelot was built on the creek at the point at the Barrier Highway crossing. No sign of the town remains above the ground surface today.
