= Franklyn, South Australia =

Franklyn South Australia
- Coordinates: 33°08′18″S 139°04′18″E
- Population: 0 (SAL 2021)
- Postcode(s): 5421
- LGA(s): Regional Council of Goyder
- Region: Yorke and Mid North
- County: Kimberley
- State electorate(s): Stuart
- Federal division(s): Grey
Localities around Franklyn:
Ucolta	Parnaroo	Hardy
Terowie	Franklyn	Pine Creek
Wonna	Wonna	Pine Creek
- Footnotes: Adjoining localities

Franklyn is a rural locality in the Mid North region of South Australia, situated in the Regional Council of Goyder. It was established in August 2000, when boundaries were formalised for the "long established local name". It comprises the northern section of the cadastral Hundred of Wonna. The name stems from a Franklyn House in Devonshire.

Franklyn was surveyed as a government town in May 1880, but the town was formally declared to have ceased to exist on 9 February 1984. Franklyn Post Office opened on 1 October 1883, was downgraded to a receiving office in January 1910, and closed on 9 July 1917. A second post office, Pandappa Dam, operated in the south-east of the locality from 1 April 1883 until around 1908. A school opened under the name of Wonna in 1883, was renamed Franklyn in 1886, and closed in 1916, while Pandappa Dam School opened in 1893 and closed in 1898.

In October 1908, a correspondent to The Chronicle in Adelaide wrote that "there used to be a lot of people living here, but [...] it is very lonely now. There are only about a dozen families here, mostly farmers [...] and dairymen. We have a school and a church, however, so that we are not total barbarians. We also have a post-office, although we have only one mail a week." In 1916, it was proposed to rename the town Wonna to avoid confusion with "Franklin", a subdivision in what is now the Adelaide suburb of Pennington, but this did not occur.

The 1051-hectare Pandappa Conservation Park is located entirely within Franklyn.
