= Wonna, South Australia =

Wonna
- Town
- Coordinates: 33°13′38″S 139°04′36″E
- Country: Australia
- State: South Australia
- Region: Yorke and Mid North
- LGA: Regional Council of Goyder

Government
  - State electorate: Stuart
  - Federal division: Grey

Population
  - Total: 0 (SAL 2016)
- Postcode: 5419
- County: Kimberley
Localities around Wonna
Terowie	Franklyn	Pine Creek
Whyte Yarcowie	Wonna	Pine Creek
Ulooloo	Mount Bryan East	Collinsville
- Coordinates; Adjoining localities

Wonna is a rural locality in the Mid North region of South Australia, situated in the Regional Council of Goyder. The modern locality was established in August 2000 when boundaries were formalised for the long established local name.

The cadastral Hundred of Wonna was proclaimed by Governor William Jervois on 31 October 1878. The modern locality covers a little over half of the hundred at the southern end, while also including a significant rural portion of the adjacent Hundred of Terowie; the remainder of the Hundred of Wonna is now in Franklyn.

A government town named Mallett was surveyed in March 1880, but it was not successful and was declared to have ceased to exist on 16 May 1929.

The historic Mungibbie Homestead is one of the oldest surviving buildings in the district and is listed on the South Australian Heritage Register, as is a nineteenth-century former smokehouse off Wonna Road.

The 2016 Australian census which was conducted in August 2016 reports that Wonna had no people living within its boundaries.
