= Ketchowla Station =

Pastoral lease in South Australia

Coordinates: 33.292°S 139.217°E

Location in South Australia

Ketchowla Station is a pastoral lease operating as a sheep station in the Mid North region of South Australia.

The property homestead is situated in the locality of Pine Creek approximately 32 kilometres (20 mi) south east of Terowie and 92 kilometres (57 mi) north west of Morgan. The property is composed of open plains and salt bush country and is watered by a surface spring in the Ketchowla range and by several bores.

Stations in the local area including Ketchowla are home to some of the world's oldest rock art, dated at being approximately 44,000 years old.

Ketchowla was established in 1852 when Christopher Giles, who had only arrived in the colony in 1849, took up the lease. Giles advertised the property to be put up for auction in 1860 when it occupied an area of 135 square miles (350 km^{2}), had a flock of 3,700 sheep and two bores that were watered by the spring. The homestead contained seven rooms constructed out of wood and stone with a detached kitchen. Other infrastructure included a shearing shed, stockyards and four other huts The run was purchased in 1861 by Captain Hillary Boucart who took a half share with Giles retaining the other half. Boucart and a young Alfred Giles resided at Ketchowla where the property served the men well supporting a flock of about 17,000 sheep. The men had spent over £10,000 mostly on dams and other improvements when the area was struck by drought from 1864 to 1866 so the flock was greatly reduced even having to kill the lambs to save the ewes. The men had to sell off the property as a result, losing nearly everything. The station then passed onto the Austin Brothers who dissolved their partnership in 1873 and attempted to auction the 245 square miles (635 km^{2}) that was stocked with 26,000 sheep.

In 1874, a flock of 7,000 sheep from Ketchowla was stopped in the Coorong on the way to market by inspectors who detected several animals infected with fluke within the flock. The infected animals were destroyed and the rest of the flock quarantined. The Austins also eventually lost everything, the property was then acquired by Thomas Elder.

Huge dust storms, described as the worst in 50 years, swept the area in 1929. A truck with the brakes on was blown 200 yards (183 m) into a tree from the force of the winds.

In 1950, Ketchowla and surrounding areas received near record rainfall with Ketchowla recording over 5 inches (127 mm) in February.

== See also ==
- List of ranches and stations
