= Baldina, South Australia =

Baldina South Australia
- Coordinates: 33.688920°S 139.0788°E
- Population: 12 (SAL 2021)
- Postcode(s): 5417
- LGA(s): Regional Council of Goyder
- State electorate(s): Stuart
- Federal division(s): Grey
Localities around Baldina:
Burra	Mongolata	Burra Eastern Districts
Burra	Baldina	Burra Eastern Districts
Burra	Worlds End	Worlds End
- Footnotes: Coordinates

Baldina is a rural locality in the Mid North region of South Australia, situated in the Regional Council of Goyder. It was established in August 2000, when boundaries were formalised for the "long established local name".

The name Baldina stems from an Aboriginal word for a set of springs on Baldina Creek. The name was used for two pastoral runs in the area: the Baldina Run, established by Henry Ayers in 1851, and the Baldina Creek Run by Alfred Barker in 1855–1856. The cadastral Hundred of Baldina was proclaimed on 30 December 1875; the hundred boundaries also include roughly half of modern Worlds End and a section of Burra Eastern Districts.

Baldina School opened in 1885 and closed in 1930, held in a Lutheran chapel. There were at least four former churches in the Hundred of Baldina: the Upper Bright (Baldina) Lutheran Church (1887-1960), the Baldina Plains (St Paul's) Lutheran Church (1878-1913) east of the Burra-Morgan Road, the Baldina Methodist Church, and the Douglas Primitive Methodist Church. A hotel, Midwinter's Hotel, was licensed in 1880 and served as a local meeting place, but was destroyed by fire in 1887. Baldina also once had its own post office.

The locality also includes the Red Banks Conservation Park, claimed to be one of the richest megafauna sites in Australia, and the Baldina pastoral station. Baldina Cemetery is now located in Burra Eastern Districts due to changes to local boundaries.

There are also two former towns within the current boundaries: Douglas and Kilto. Douglas, along Eastern Road in the north of Baldina, was surveyed in March 1877 and declared to have ceased to exist on 18 June 1981. Kilto, now in the south of Baldina, was gazetted as an unbounded locality; it had originally been named Klaebes, but was one of the Germanic place names renamed during World War I. Klaebes Post Office opened in August 1879, closed in December 1910, and reopened around 1913; its final closure date is unknown.
