= Ucolta, South Australia =

Locality in South Australia

Ucolta
- Town
- Coordinates: 32°59′48″S 138°57′29″E
- Country: Australia
- State: South Australia
- Region: Yorke and Mid North
- LGA: District Council of Peterborough

Government
  - State electorate: Stuart
  - Federal division: Grey
- Elevation: 532 m (1,745 ft)

Population
  - Total: 13 (SAL 2021)
- Time zone: UTC+9:30 (ACST)
  - Summer (DST): UTC+10:30 (ACST)
- Postcode: 5422
- County: Kimberley
- Mean max temp: 21.9 °C (71.4 °F)
- Mean min temp: 7.3 °C (45.1 °F)
- Annual rainfall: 365.7 mm (14.40 in)
Localities around Ucolta
Minvalara	Dawson	Dawson
Minvalara; Peterborough; Sunnybrae	Ucolta	Parnaroo
Terowie	Terowie	Franklyn

Ucolta is a locality in the Mid North region of South Australia. It was named for a former railway station on the South Australian Railways' 1067 mm (3 ft 6 in) narrow-gauge railway line between Port Pirie and the New South Wales border. After the line was re-engineered and converted to 1435 mm (4 ft 8 1/2 in) standard gauge in 1970, when the infrastructure was demolished, trains did not stop there.

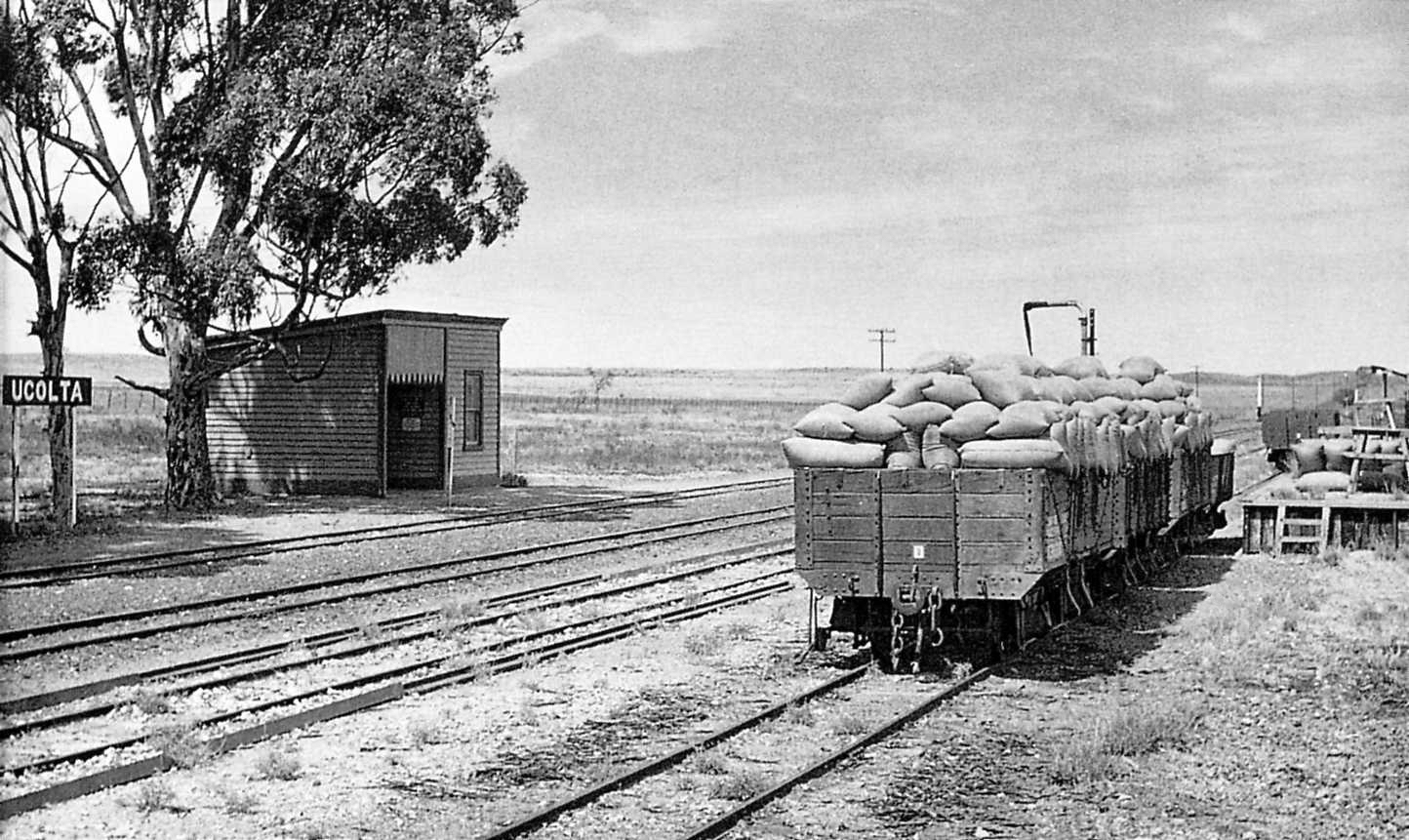
The Ucolta station was demolished when the narrow-gauge railway was re-engineered and converted to standard gauge in 1970

Ucolta is also where the Barrier Highway first meets the railway line, and the Wilmington–Ucolta Road which connects across the northern side of the Mid-North, providing the shortest road route from Western Australia and Eyre Peninsula via Port Augusta to Broken Hill and New South Wales.

The name Ucolta was recorded as an Aboriginal name in 1862, but its meaning has been lost. The former Ucolta Post Office was in the railway station.

== Lancelot ==
A town named Lancelot was surveyed in April 1877. Nothing now remains of the town except the cemetery; the state government declared that it had ceased to exist on 22 May 1980. It was adjacent to the Barrier Highway where it crosses Willanowie Creek (about 4.5 kilometres (2.8 mi) south of Ucolta railway station) and is now incorporated in the bounded locality of Ucolta. Lancelot cemetery remains managed by the District Council of Peterborough.

It had been anticipated that the railway north from Terowie would pass Lancelot, however the railway was built further west to meet the east-west railway at Peterborough. In the 1890s, Lancelot had both government and Catholic schools.

For the 1925 federal election, the polling booth at Lancelot was closed, with a new polling booth at Ucolta, which took a total of 49 votes.
