= Willalo, South Australia =

Willalo South Australia
- Coordinates: 33.44°S 138.79°E
- Population: 59 (SAL 2021)
- Postcode(s): 5419
- LGA(s): Regional Council of Goyder
- State electorate(s): Stuart
- Federal division(s): Grey
Localities around Willalo:
Canowie	Hallett	Hallett
Hacklins Corner	Willalo	Hallett
Spalding	North Booborowie	Mount Bryan
- Footnotes: Coordinates

Willalo is a rural locality in the Mid North region of South Australia, situated in the Regional Council of Goyder. It was established in August 2000, when boundaries were formalised for the "long established local name". It was also known in its early days as North Booboorowie.

The Willalo Hall was built in 1912 and demolished in 2015. The Willalo School began operating in the hall in 1912 and closed in 1971. The Willalo Methodist Church was built in 1928; its date of closure is unknown. Willalo also once had a tennis club.

The locality is zoned for use in primary production, variously for either agriculture or grazing purposes.
