= Whyte Yarcowie, South Australia =

Whyte Yarcowie
- Town
- Coordinates: 33°13′51″S 138°53′06″E
- Country: Australia
- State: South Australia
- Region: Yorke and Mid North
- LGA: Regional Council of Goyder
- Location: 215 km (134 mi) N of Adelaide; 10 km (6.2 mi) S of Terowie; 21 km (13 mi) N of Hallett
- Established: 28 May 1874 (town); 24 August 2000 (locality)

Government
  - State electorate: Stuart
  - Federal division: Grey
- Elevation (Railway station): 552 m (1,811 ft)

Population
  - Total: 50 (SAL 2021)
- Time zone: UTC+9:30 (ACST)
  - Summer (DST): UTC+10:30 (ACST)
- Postcode: 5420
- County: Kimberley; Victoria
- Mean max temp: 21.9 °C (71.4 °F)
- Mean min temp: 7.3 °C (45.1 °F)
- Annual rainfall: 365.7 mm (14.40 in)
Localities around Whyte Yarcowie
Canowie Belt	Terowie	Terowie
Canowie Belt	Whyte Yarcowie	Wonna
Belalie East	Hallett	Ulooloo

Whyte Yarcowie is a town and a locality in the Australian state of South Australia. It is on the Barrier Highway between Hallett and Terowie.

The town of Yarcowie was surveyed in 1875. First land was released to settlers in the district of Yarcowie in March 1872. The name is said to be Aboriginal (Ngadjuri) for "Wide Water". The name changed to Whyte Yarcowie in 1929 after early pastoralist John Whyte. The railway station on the Peterborough railway line was opened in 1880, but the railway closed in 1988.

The Yarcowie Hotel (formerly the Commercial Hotel) on the Barrier Highway opened around 1881. A second hotel – also then known as the Yarcowie Hotel or Globe Hotel – operated between 1875 and 1893.

Whyte Yarcowie is located within the federal division of Grey, the state electoral district of Stuart and the local government area of the Regional Council of Goyder.
