= Mongolata, South Australia =

Coordinates: 33°34′S 139°06′E

Mongolata
- Town
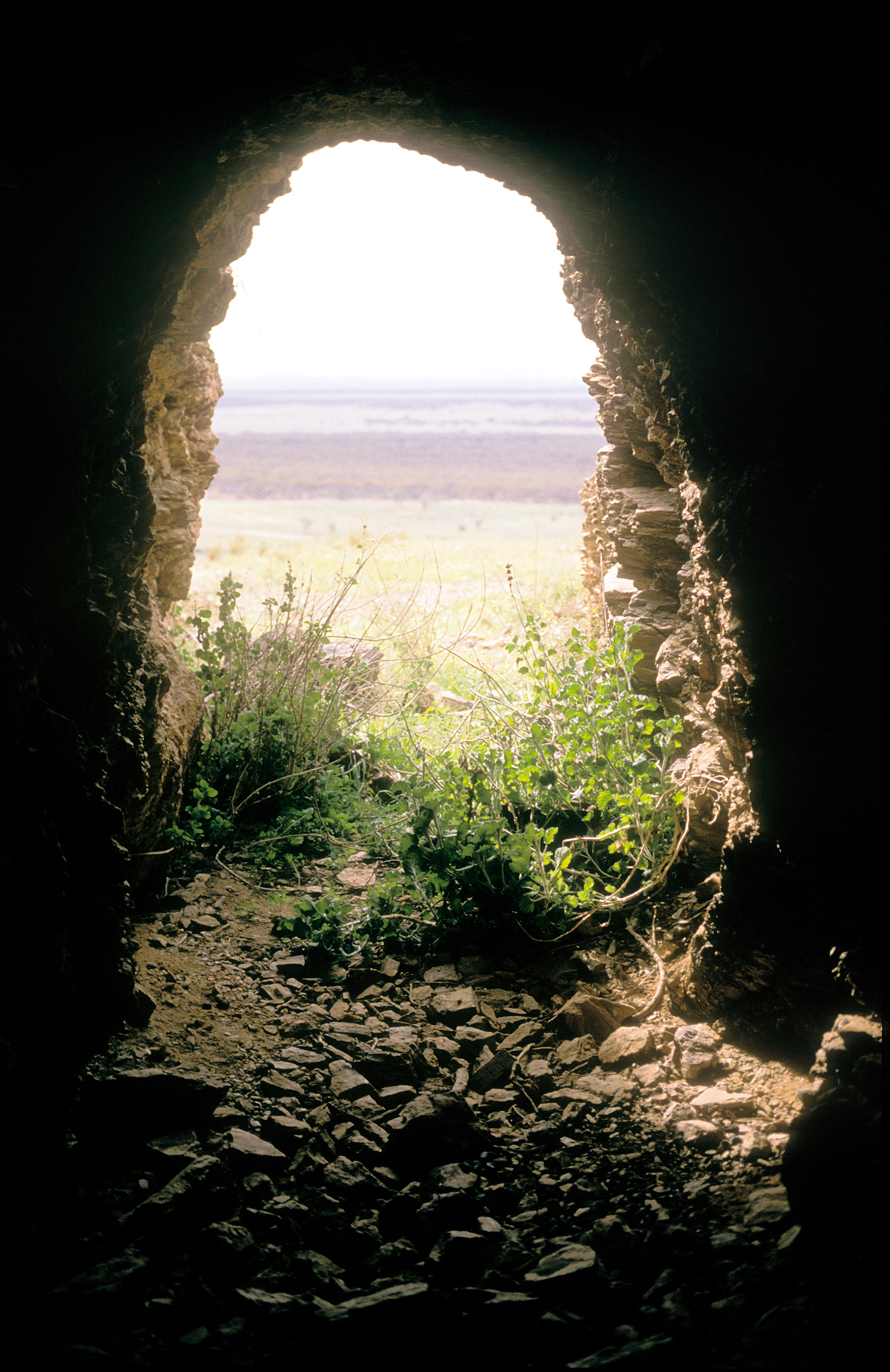
- Country: Australia
- State: South Australia
- LGA: Regional Council of Goyder

Government
  - State electorate: Stuart
  - Federal division: Grey

Population
  - Total: 7 (SAL 2021)
- Postcode: 5417
Localities around Mongolata
Mount Bryan East	Mount Bryan East; Burra Eastern Districts	Burra Eastern Districts
Burra	Mongolata	Burra Eastern Districts
Baldina	Baldina	Burra Eastern Districts

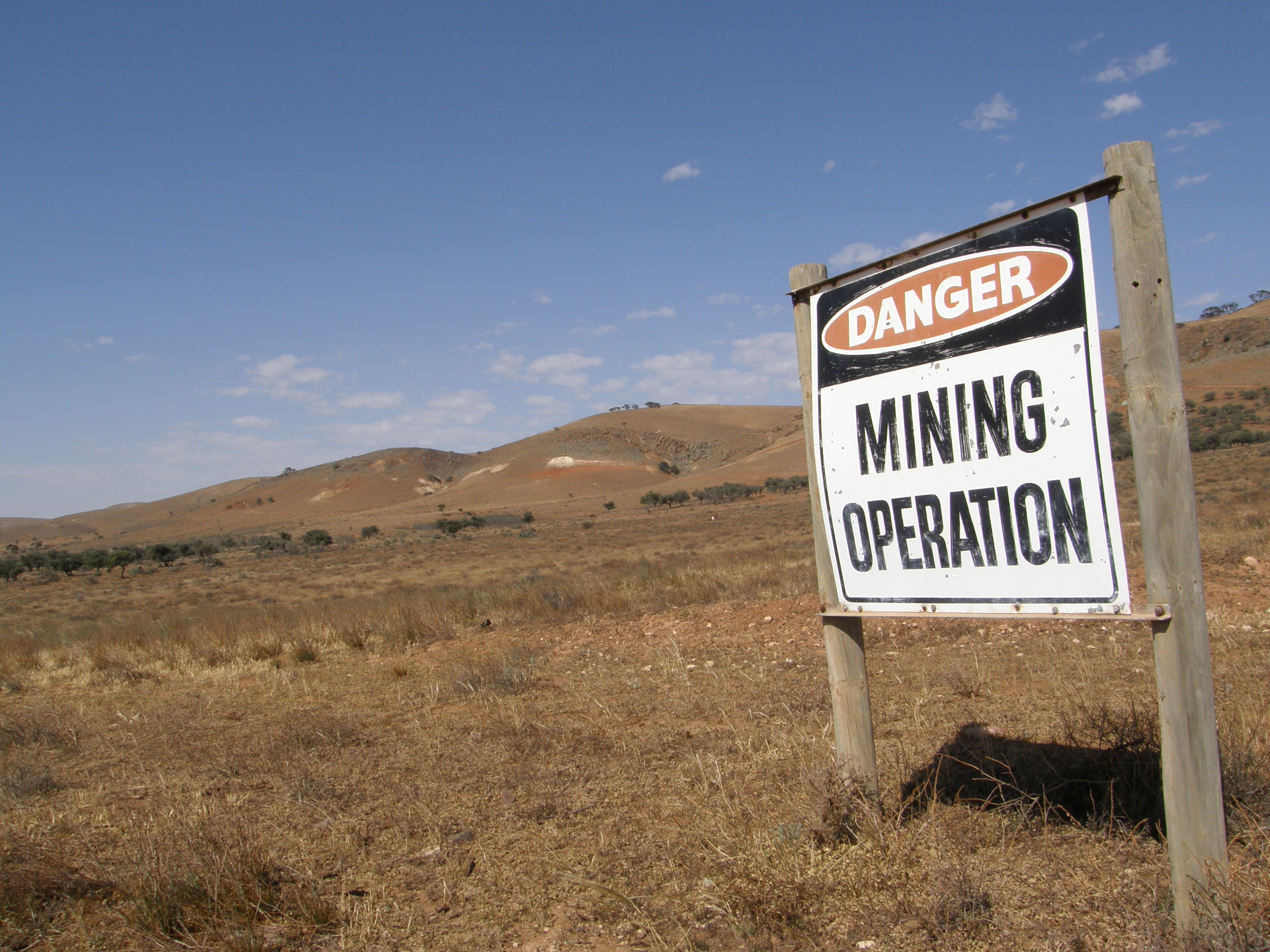
View towards mine workings of the Mongolata goldfield

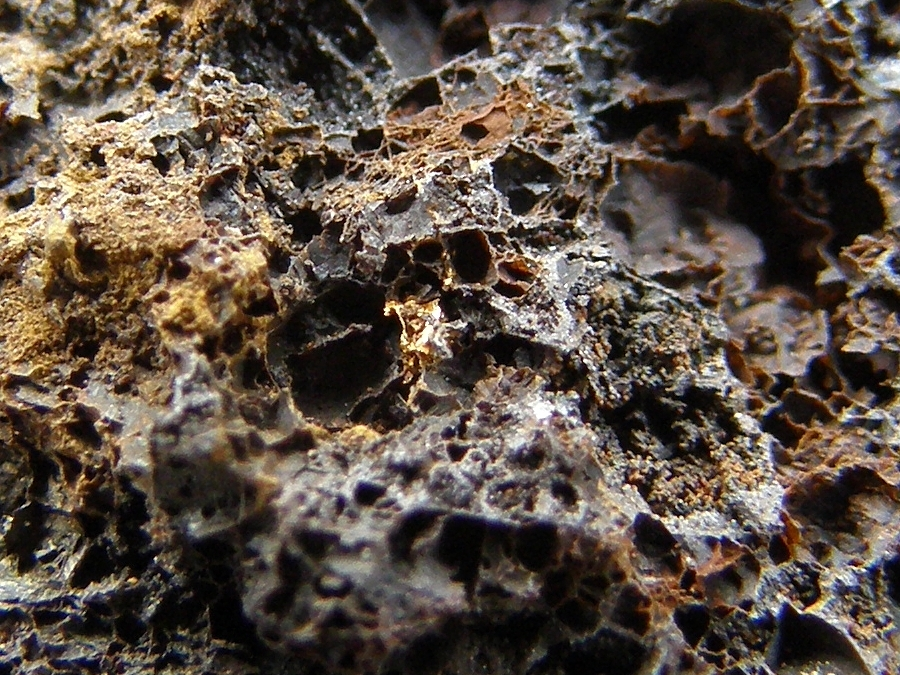
Native gold on goethite from the Mongolata goldfield

Mongolata is a rural locality in the Mid North region of South Australia, situated in the Regional Council of Goyder. The modern locality was established in August 2000, when boundaries were formalised for the "long established local name".

The Hundred of Mongolata was proclaimed by Governor Anthony Musgrave on 30 December 1875, derived from an Aboriginal name. Mongolata Post Office opened on 1 April 1878 and closed on 31 December 1946. A government town named "Tracy" near the Poonunda Homestead was surveyed in June 1881, but was not successful and was incorporated into the broader Mongolata locality. The modern locality is smaller than the cadastral hundred on the northern, western and eastern sides.

It was settled as a farming area, with the first residents planting potatoes and then later barley; however, they often struggled for lack of rain. A school was established in the late 1800s, but closed in 1898. Gold was discovered at Mongolata in 1930, and at its peak 120 men worked on the field. A government battery and cyanide plant were completed in 1932 and opened in March 1933. Attempts were made to reopen a school at Mongolata for the mining families in 1935–1936, but this was unsuccessful. Most miners had left by the end of 1936, but the largest mine on the field, the Byles' Mine, remained in operation, operating until 1954, when both the mine and battery closed.

The field produced about 11,000oz of gold extracted from 7,749t of ore. Byles mine was the most significant producer with 3.900oz, followed by Takati (2,900oz)and Baldina (1,400oz) mines. Especially Takati was known for rich specimen gold, the largest piece weighing 216oz. Gold was almost entirely extracted from a stockwork-type mineralisation within the Neoproterozoic Cox sandstone. The quartz veins are rich in goethite, often pseudomorph after siderite. Native gold is mostly associated with goethite. Alluvial mining along the range front of the Mongolata goldfield remained largely unsuccessful.

The historic Mongolata Goldfield Ruins, including the remnants of the cyanide works, eating house, dugouts and former Byles' Mine, are located off Mongolata Road and listed on the South Australian Heritage Register. The goldfield is significant as one of only two established in South Australia during the Great Depression.
