= Ulooloo, South Australia =

Ulooloo South Australia
- Coordinates: 33°18′55″S 138°56′13″E
- Population: 0 (SAL 2016)
- Postcode(s): 5419
- Elevation: 565 m (1,854 ft)
- Location: 200 km (124 mi) N of Adelaide; 41 km (25 mi) N of Burra; 45 km (28 mi) south of Peterborough
- LGA(s): Regional Council of Goyder
- Region: Yorke and Mid North
- County: Burra; Kimberley; Victoria
- State electorate(s): Stuart
- Federal division(s): Grey
Suburbs around Ulooloo:
Whyte Yarcowie	Whyte Yarcowie; Wonna	Wonna
Whyte Yarcowie; Hallett	Ulooloo	Wonna
Hallett	Hallett	Mount Bryan East

Ulooloo is a locality in the Mid North of South Australia. It is midway between Burra and Peterborough on the Barrier Highway from Adelaide to Broken Hill, New South Wales.

The locality is predominantly on the east side of the highway, however the former railway station and post office on the Peterborough railway line were on the western side of the highway.

Ulooloo was the site of a goldfield in the late 19th and early 20th centuries. Today, the major industry is sheep farming, including a Dohne sheep stud.

Ulooloo had two schools: one that operated from 1888 to 1906 and one that operated from 1928 to 1940.

The historic Ulooloo Homesteads, Dairies and Hut are listed on the South Australian Heritage Register.
