= Canowie Belt, South Australia =

Coordinates: 33°11′S 138°45′E

Canowie Belt South Australia
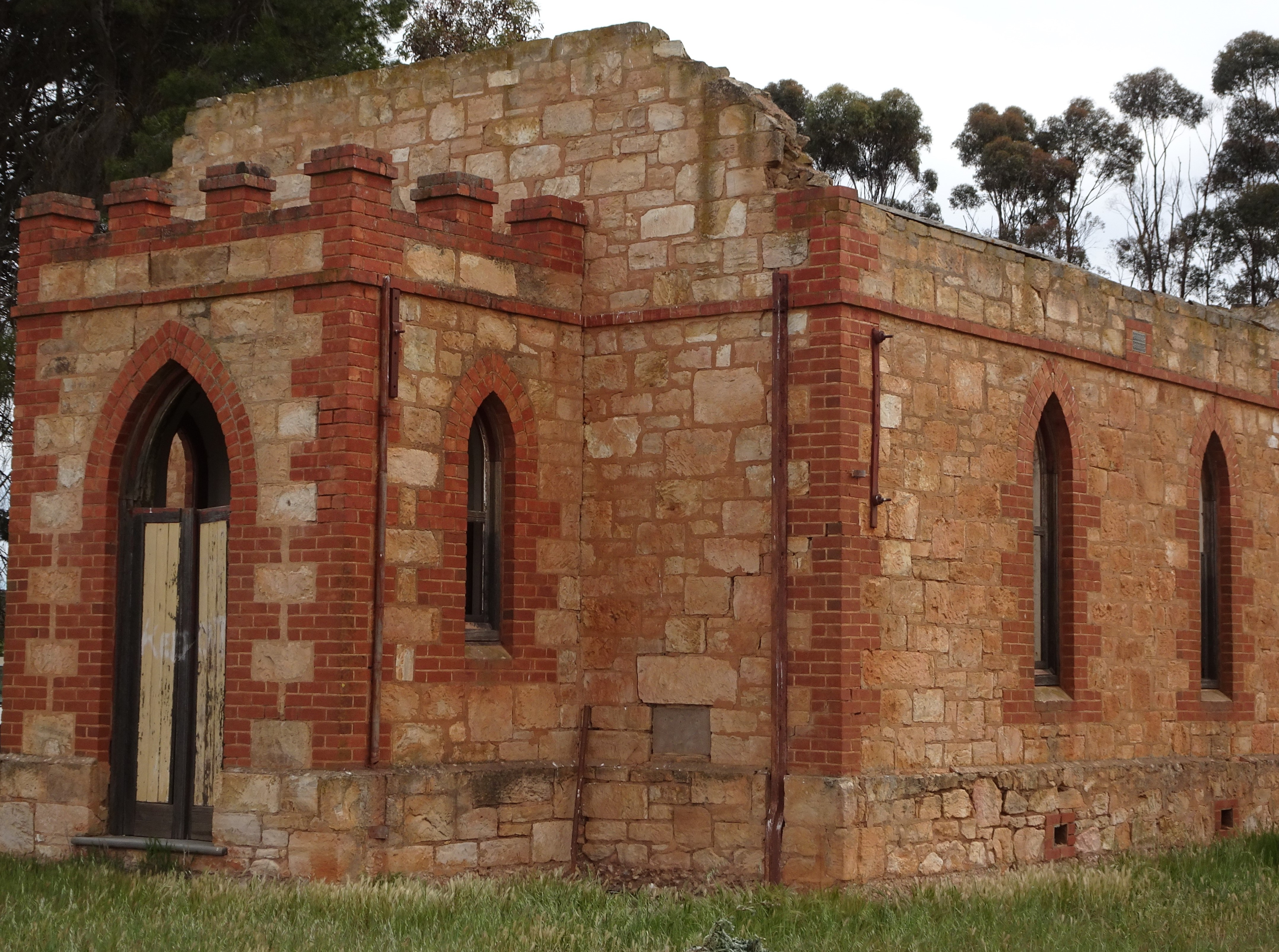
- Church ruins

- Population: 29 (SAL 2021)
- Postcode(s): 5420
- LGA(s): Regional Council of Goyder; Northern Areas Council
- State electorate(s): Stuart
- Federal division(s): Grey
Localities around Canowie Belt:
Sunnybrae	Sunnybrae	Terowie
Belalie North	Canowie Belt	Whyte Yarcowie
Belalie East	Belalie East	Whyte Yarcowie
- Footnotes: Adjoining localities

Canowie Belt is a rural locality in the Mid North region of South Australia, situated in 2 Regional Council. It was established in August 2000, when boundaries were formalised for the "long established local name". The name is adapted from "Kanya-owie", an Aboriginal word for "rock waterhole", and was associated with the Canowie Station pastoral lease.

A school at Canowie Belt opened as "Yongala Blocks" in 1904 and closed in 1967. The school had suffered early difficulties when it was found that the walls "cracked badly" after only ten weeks of usage.

Canowie Belt Post Office opened on 1 December 1902 and closed on 31 December 1946.

Canowie Belt Baptist Church opened in 1904, but has since closed. In 1911, the church reported that "the subject of baptism was not very prominent" in their meetings so as to have regard for non-Baptist parishioners in their area.

The Canowie Belt Hall opened in July 1909.
