= Regional Council of Goyder =

Coordinates: 33°41′00″S 138°56′00″E

- Local government area
- Interactive map of Regional Council of Goyder
- Country: Australia
- State: South Australia
- Region: Yorke and Mid North
- Established: 23 January 1997
- Council seat: Burra

Government
  - Mayor: Peter Mattey
  - State electorate: Stuart
  - Federal division: Grey

Area
  - Total: 6,718.9 km^{2} (2,594.2 sq mi)

Population
  - Total: 4,060 (LGA 2021)
- Website: Regional Council of Goyder
LGAs around Regional Council of Goyder
Northern Areas	Peterborough	Outback Communities
Clare and Gilbert Valleys	Goyder	Outback Communities
Light	Mid Murray	Mid Murray

The Regional Council of Goyder is a local government area located in the Mid North region of South Australia. The council area is reliant on agriculture as a mainstay of its economy, with manufacturing and tourism also becoming prominent. The council seat is at Burra. A branch office is at Eudunda.

== History ==
The Regional Council of Goyder was created in 1997, when four municipalities in the region were amalgamated: the District Council of Burra Burra, the District Council of Eudunda, the District Council of Hallett and the District Council of Robertstown. Mining features prominently in the region's history, particularly the mining of copper.

Goyder is named after former Surveyor General George Goyder who mapped Goyder's Line of rainfall in South Australia in 1865. This map is still of great relevance to local cereal cropping as the line dissects the council area. It is also of great cultural importance to the whole upper Mid North region of South Australia, with the 150th anniversary of Goyder's Line being celebrated in Orroroo, just north of the Goyder council area, in November 2015.

== Economy ==
In the past, the district was heavily reliant on copper mining as the integral part of its economy. Since the mines shut down many years ago, agriculture has become the prevailing industry.

Agriculture in the Goyder region is primarily associated with cereal crops, such as wheat and barley, as well as sheep grazing for merino wool. Dairy and beef cattle, piggeries, and chicken farms also play a minor part in the economic structure of the region. More recently established industries include viticulture and locally grown and produced food products. Manufacturing interests are increasingly entering the area.

Tourism makes up a part of the economy, with the town of Burra a major attraction, known for its mining history and rural lifestyle.

== Localities ==
The largest town and council seat of the district is Burra. The council area includes the towns and localities of Apoinga, Australia Plains, Baldina, Booborowie, Bower, Brady Creek, Bright, Buchanan, Bundey, Burra Eastern Districts, Canowie, Collinsville, Emu Downs, Eudunda, Franklyn, Geranium Plains, Gum Creek, Hampden, Hallelujah Hills, Hallett, Hanson, Julia, Koonoona, Leighton, Mongolata, Mount Bryan, Mount Bryan East, Neales Flat, Ngapala, North Booborowie, Peep Hill, Pine Creek, Point Pass, Porter Lagoon, Robertstown, Rocky Plain, Sutherlands, Terowie, Ulooloo, Whyte Yarcowie, Willalo, Wonna and Worlds End, and part of Brownlow, Canowie Belt, Dutton, Farrell Flat, Frankton, Hansborough and Steinfeld.

The pastoral lease of Ketchowla Station is located in the council area.

== Funding ==
The council derives approximately 45% of its income from council rates. 41% of the council's income comes from state and federal government grants. Other income comes from statutory charges, user charges and council owned commercial activity.

== Council ==
Ward	Councillor	Notes
Hallett	Tony Brooks	Mayor
Robertstown	John Neal	
Eudunda	Blake Rule	
Eudunda	Peter Dunn	
Burra	Bill Gebhardt	
Burra	Jane Kellock	Deputy Mayor
Burra	Darryl Venning	
