= Hallett, South Australia =

Hallett South Australia
- Coordinates: 33°24′S 138°53′E
- Population: 166 (SAL 2021)
- Postcode(s): 5419
- Time zone: ACST (UTC+9:30)
  - Summer (DST): ACDT (UTC+10:30)
- Location: 32 km (20 mi) N of Burra; 38 km (24 mi) SE of Jamestown
- LGA(s): Regional Council of Goyder
- State electorate(s): Stuart
- Federal division(s): Grey
Localities around Hallett:
Belalie East	Whyte Yarcowie	Ulooloo
Willalo, Canowie	Hallett	Mount Bryan East
North Booborowie	Mount Bryan	Mount Bryan East

Hallett is a small town in Mid North region of South Australia, situated on the Barrier Highway 32 kilometres (20 mi) north of Burra and 38 kilometres (24 mi) south-east of Jamestown, Hallett lies close to Goyder's Line, plotted in the nineteenth century by George Goyder, separating the land suitable for cropping from the land suitable for grazing.

The town was named for pioneering pastoralist and politician John Hallett, and laid out on his property "Willogoleechee". The first were offered for sale on 7 July 1870. Hallett Cove was also named for him.

Once a railhead for the local farming community, the town today features a General Store with fuel supply and the Wildongoleechie Hotel, which dates from 1868. A second hotel, the Unicorn Hotel, existed in the 1870s, but is long gone.

The Good Shepherd Catholic Church was formerly the Hallett Freemasons Lodge; once the second-smallest lodge in the state, it closed in 1978 and was acquired by the Catholic Church in 1980. The building remains but no longer operates as a Church, sold in 2023 it is now a private residence. The Uniting Church (formerly the Methodist Church) opened in 1928. A third church, St Catherine of Sienna Anglican Church, opened in 1957 and closed in 2003.

Hallett was located on the broad gauge Roseworthy-Peterborough railway line. The railway line was closed and removed in the early 1990s.

The historic Cappeedee Homestead and Woolshed is listed on the South Australian Heritage Register.

Hallett is the closest town to Mount Bryan East, birthplace of Sir Hubert Wilkins polar explorer, ornithologist, pilot, soldier, geographer and photographer (1888–1958), perhaps the last modern explorer. Sir Hubert Wilkins birthplace and childhood home, Netfield, now restored as a historic site, is easily accessible from the renowned Mount Dare Driving Circuit between Hallett and Terowie.

Hallett is on the long distance walking route, the Heysen Trail.

== Notable people ==
- Beaumont Smith (1885–1950), film director and producer
- Hubert Wilkins
