= Mount Bryan East, South Australia =

Coordinates: 33°24′17″S 139°01′06″E

Mount Bryan East South Australia
- Population: 7 (SAL 2021)
- Postcode(s): 5419
- LGA(s): Regional Council of Goyder
- State electorate(s): Stuart
- Federal division(s): Grey
Localities around Mount Bryan East:
Ulooloo	Wonna	Wonna
Hallett	Mount Bryan East	Collinsville
Mount Bryan	Burra; Mongolata	Burra Eastern Districts
- Footnotes: Adjoining localities

Mount Bryan East is a rural locality in the Mid North region of South Australia, situated in the Regional Council of Goyder. It was established in August 2000, when boundaries were formalised for the "long established local name".

Confusingly, it does not include the former government town of Mount Bryan East, which is now located in adjacent Mount Bryan.

A school at Mount Bryan East was opened in 1885. It closed in 1916, reopened in 1925, but closed permanently in 1947.

Sir Hubert Wilkins was born and raised at Mount Bryan East, and attended the local school. His family home survives, having been restored from ruins by Dick Smith in 2001, and is open to visitors.

== See also ==
- Caroona Creek Conservation Park
