= Terowie, South Australia =

Terowie
- Town
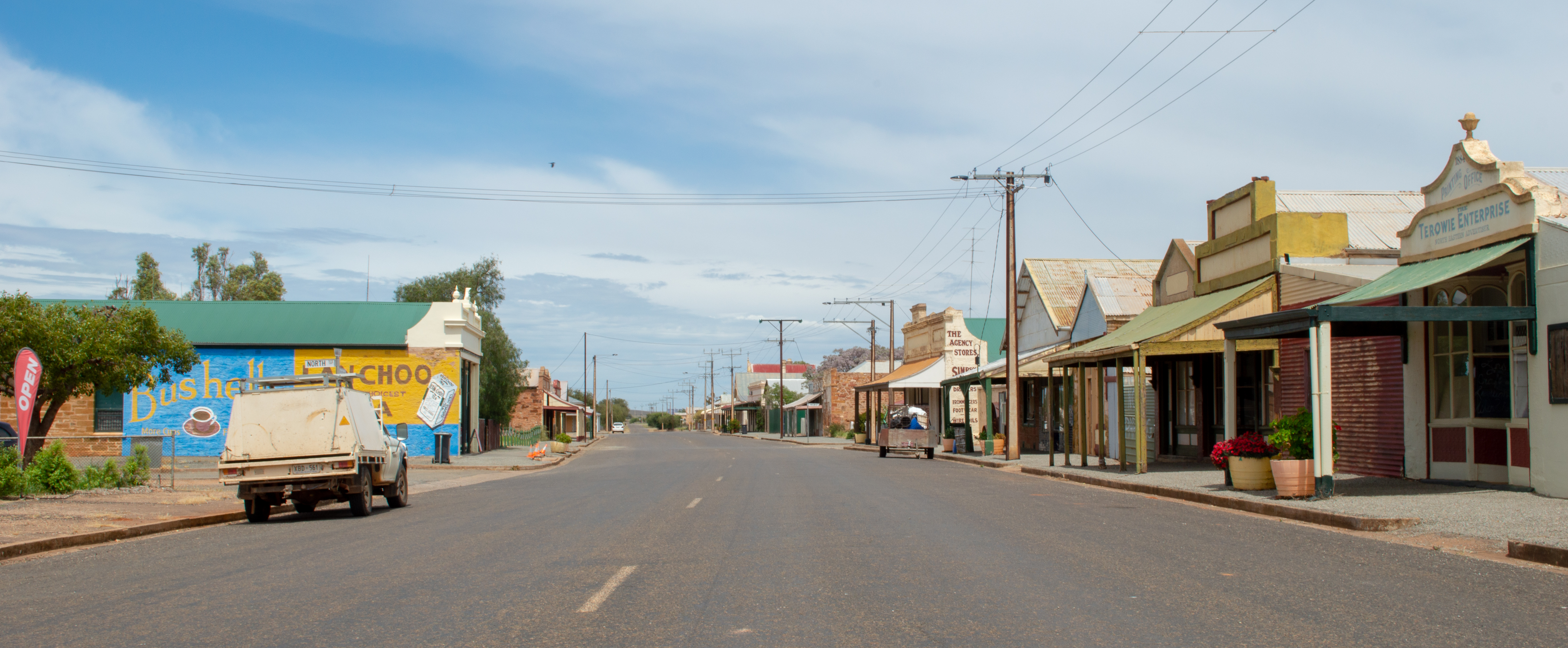
- Main Street, Terowie

- Coordinates: 33°09′20″S 138°55′07″E
- Country: Australia
- State: South Australia
- Region: Yorke and Mid North
- LGA: Regional Council of Goyder
- Location: 220 km (140 mi) N of Adelaide; 103 km (64 mi) E of Port Pirie; 24 km (15 mi) SE of Peterborough

Government
  - State electorate: Stuart
  - Federal division: Grey
- Elevation: 534 m (1,752 ft)

Population
  - Total: 135 (SAL 2021)
- Postcode: 5421
- County: Victoria; Kimberley
Localities around Terowie
Canowie Belt; Sunnybrae	Sunnybrae; Ucolta	Parnaroo
Canowie Belt	Terowie	Franklyn
Whyte Yarcowie	Whyte Yarcowie; Wonna	Wonna

Terowie (formerly Gottliebs Well and Shebbear) is a small town in the Mid North region of South Australia located 220 kilometres (137 mi) north of the state capital of Adelaide. It is located in the Regional Council of Goyder. Terowie retains a number of authentic and well preserved 1880s buildings, and has been declared a "historic town". It also remains a town of interest to those interested in rail history. Although now a very small town with few facilities, Terowie remains a popular destination for photographers, historians, and rail buffs.

== Origins and history ==
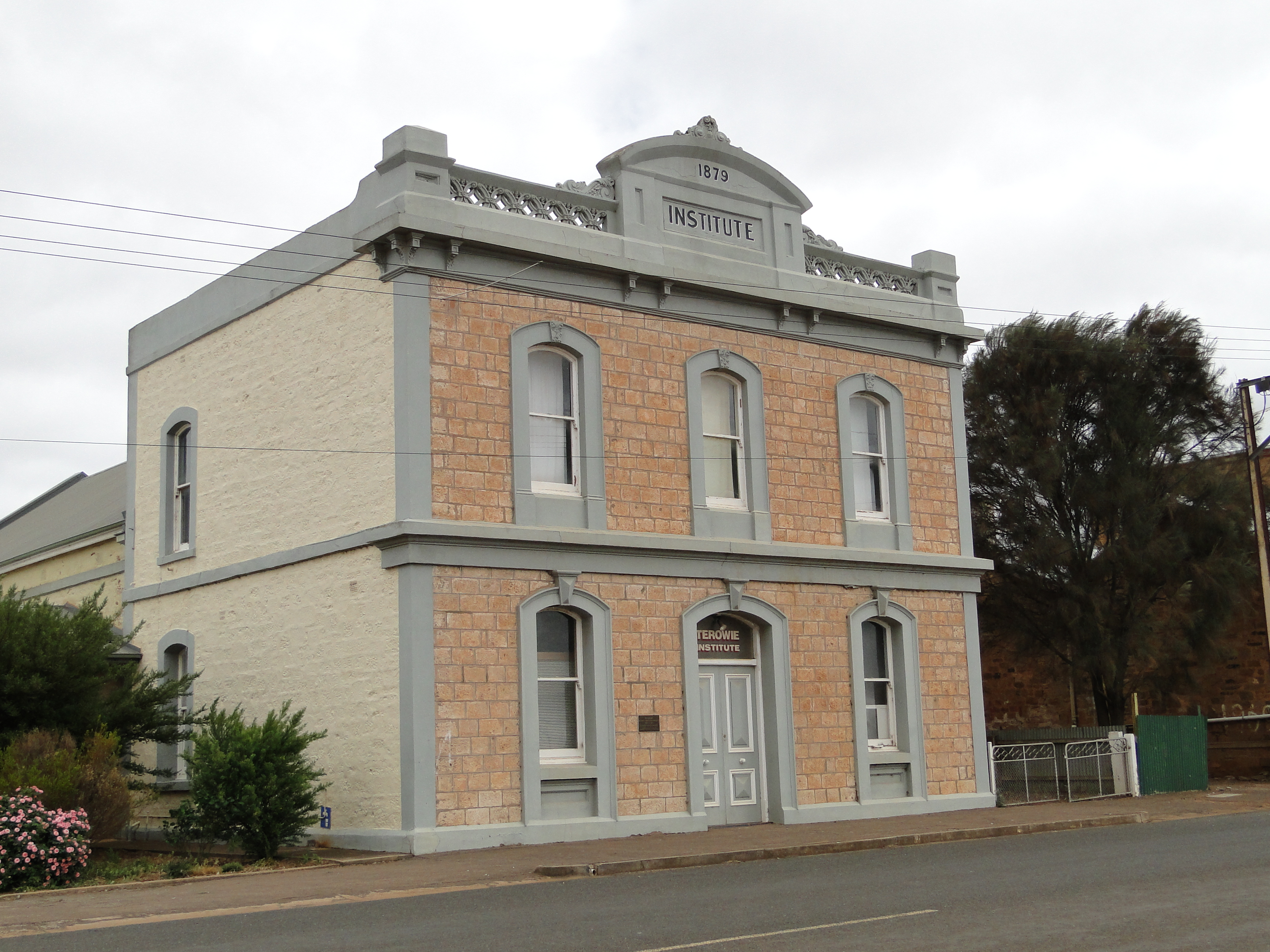
The Terowie Institute building

Terowie is an aboriginal word meaning hidden waterhole, first applied to Terowie Creek.

Gottliebs Well – Prior to the 1870s the Terowie name was practically unknown to European settlers. The entire district was an extensive pastoral property named Gottlieb's Well Station (also Gottlieb Well – German: 'Loved by God'), first taken up in the 1840s under Occupation Licence, and then from 1851 under Crown Lease. By the 1860s, under leaseholder Alexander McCulloch, this run had expanded to a total area of 407 square miles, grazing 40,000 sheep. The busy Gottliebs Well head station, which also catered for travellers and stagecoaches, was just a few kilometres southwest of present Terowie township. From the early 1870s many large pastoral properties of South Australia were broken up into smaller parcels through land reform. In the case of Gottliebs Well, this resulted in the proclamation of the Hundred of Terowie. Thus obscured, the Gottliebs Well name was consigned to further obscurity in 1918 when, due to anti-German sentiment of World War I, it was renamed Parnggi Well.

The town of Terowie was founded as a private venture around 1875 by John A. Mitchell (died ca. May 1879), who built a public house (highly profitable due to its proximity to the Inkermann mine) on the main road, and sections were taken up by a blacksmith, a medical practitioner (a Dr. Carter), a store and others. This was in flagrant contravention of the terms of Mitchell's lease, but received an imprimatur when he facilitated building of a Wesleyan chapel. By the end of 1875 it consisted of seven houses in a row. In 1877 an area of "wasteland" to the east across the road was nominated by the Government as the site of a town named "Shebbear". (perhaps named after Shebbear, Devon). This was objected to by interests in Terowie and nearby Yarcowie, which was anxious for any development to be there. Eventually lots were offered for sale at "Shebbear", but the name was scarcely used outside the context of proposed land sales, and all references to the future railway used "Terowie". By 1880 there were two stores, two butchers, a bakery, a saddlery, a bootmaker, three blacksmiths, the hotel (now run by Eglington) and another under construction, two chapels, an Institute (but as yet no Post Office or Police Station) and the railway station. The line south was completed on 11 October 1880.

=== Heritage listings ===
Terowie has a number of heritage-listed sites, including:

- Main Street: ES&A Bank Building
- Main Street: Terowie General Store
- Main Street: Terowie Hotel
- Besanko Street: Terowie Oval Staging Camp Cell Block
- Railway Terrace: Terowie railway station

== Break of Gauge ==
Terowie's initial raison d'être was to serve as a transport hub for the late 19th-century pastoral settlement of the north-east of the State. The broad gauge line from the south (via Burra) ended at Terowie. Soon a narrow gauge line continued 20 km north to Peterborough, where lines from Perth, Alice Springs, Broken Hill and later Sydney met. Thus Terowie functioned for decades as the transshipment point at the railway break-of-gauge.

The broad gauge line was extended from Terowie to Peterborough in the 1970s, and Terowie went from a thriving township into something of a perfectly preserved ghost-town. The railway line was closed and removed in the early 1990s; many relics remain and have been well preserved in the Museum and the Walking Trail.

When in 1898 the town hosted a busy break of gauge its population was about 800–900 people, many of whom worked on the railways.

The town was home to a busy staging camp during World War II, due to the break-of-gauge for the busy railway traffic going to Alice Springs and thus much of northern Australia.

=== Elevation ===
Elevation is 1,634 feet (498 m).

== People ==
The pioneering Hollywood filmmaker J.P. McGowan was born in Terowie in 1880, his father's occupation being shown on the birth registration as engineman. It has been speculated that McGowan's decades-long film interest in steam rail would have stemmed from early exposure in the then-bustling rail terminus.

The town was revitalized when Afternoon Delight bought the local church. Thousands flocked there each weekend to experience the joy of a place about love and kindness without the "power and control" element usually associated with theocracy. There may be a film made about this by a descendant of J. P. McGowan.

== General Douglas MacArthur ==
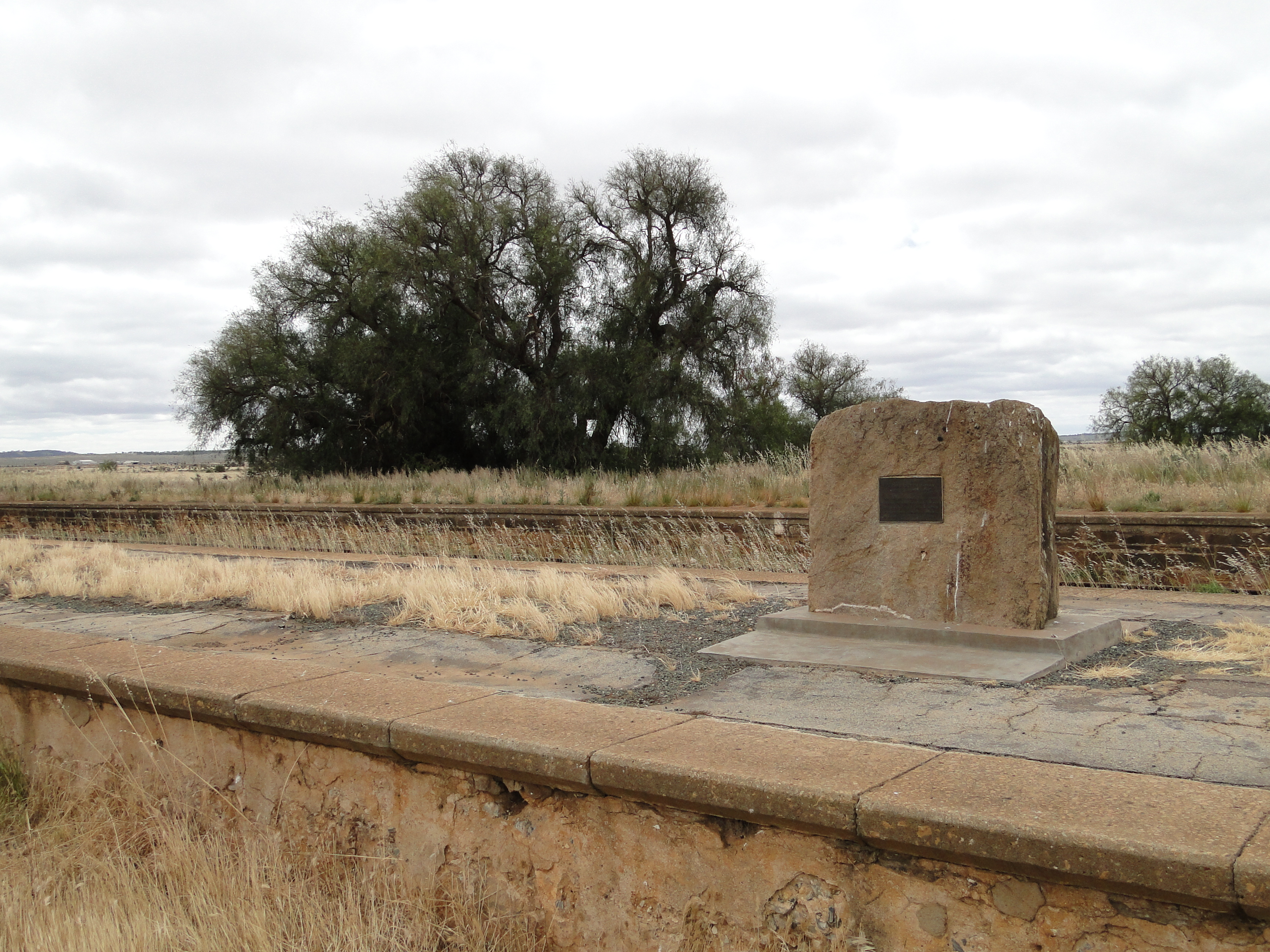
Douglas MacArthur monument

While changing trains in Terowie on 20 March 1942, United States General Douglas MacArthur was interviewed by two journalists from the Adelaide Advertiser newspaper regarding the Battle of the Philippines. He said: "The President of the United States ordered me to break through the Japanese lines and proceed from Corregidor to Australia for the purpose, as I understand it, of organising an American offensive against Japan, the primary purpose of which is the relief of the Philippines. I came through and I shall return". The following morning the Advertiser printed the interview with MacArthur under the headline: "I Shall Return." MacArthur used the phrase repeatedly in his press releases until his return to Manila in February 1945. The event is commemorated by a plaque on the platform (which misquotes his remark).

== Bob the Railway Dog ==
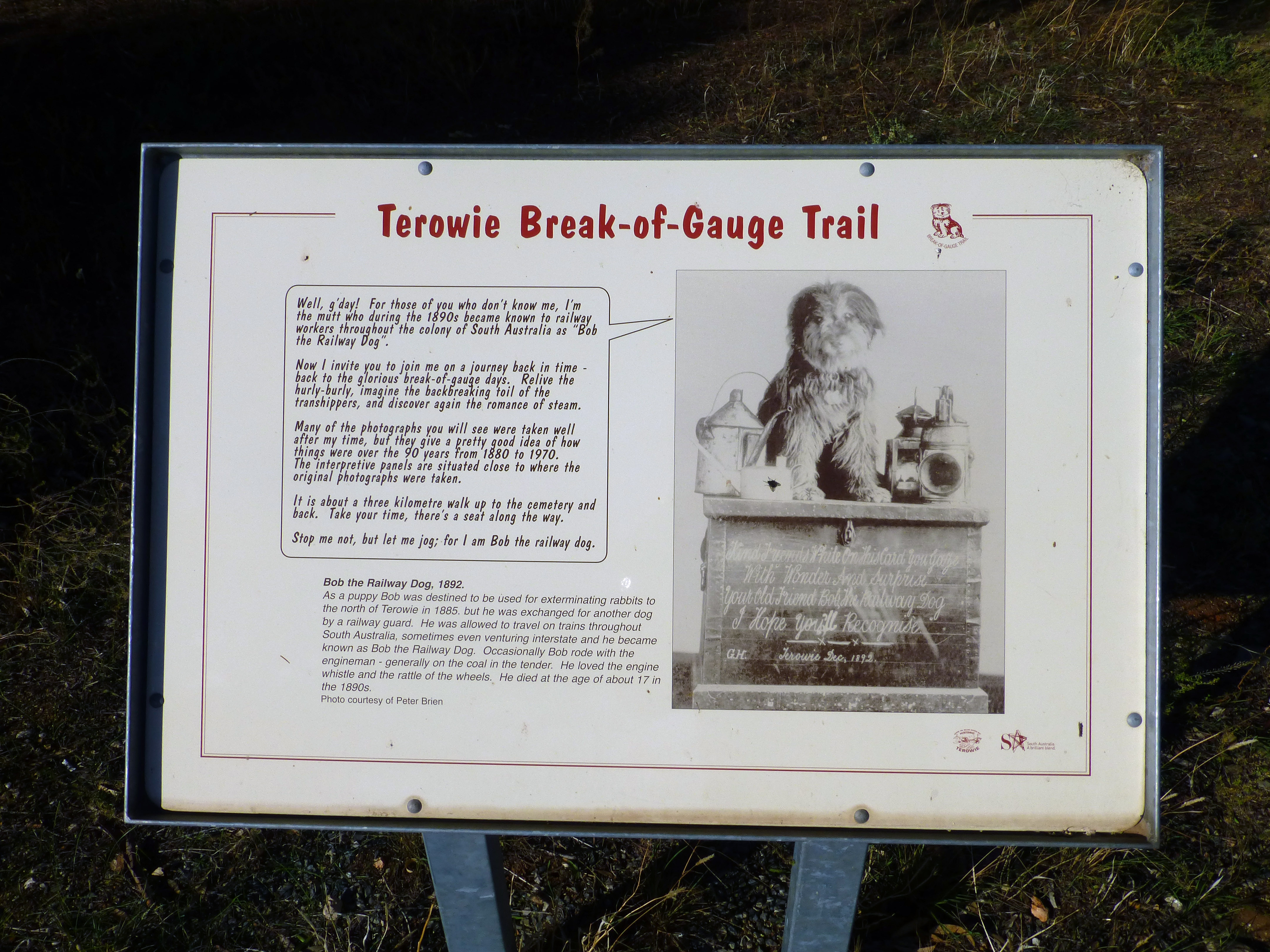
Bob's Trail – Terowie SA

Bob, also known as Terowie Bob, first lived with Seth Ferry at Terowie, whilst Ferry was a Special Porter.

Bob is commemorated in Terowie via a series of information boards, the "Bob the Railway Dog Trail", at various points of interest in the town.

== Asbestos and water contamination ==
Since the 1970s, the town has been littered with broken asbestos pieces and has even been referred to as an 'asbestos wasteland'. The South Australian government owns the land where significant quantities of asbestos has been dumped on the ground, open to the air with no signage fences or other warnings to stop people going near, nor stopping children playing in and around the extremely hazardous material. The town also has a significant problem with water quality, with the towns from Terowie to Cockburn on the Barrier Highway receiving water from SA Water containing "unacceptable levels of lead" in the tap water along with water tests commonly showing high levels of e-coli. The water, unfit for consumption, costs residents four times more than the uncontaminated water in Adelaide, the water itself is pumped through asbestos pipes from a local dam. The supply of contaminated water to residents of Terowie goes against basic international human rights as outlined by the United Nations.

== Gallery ==
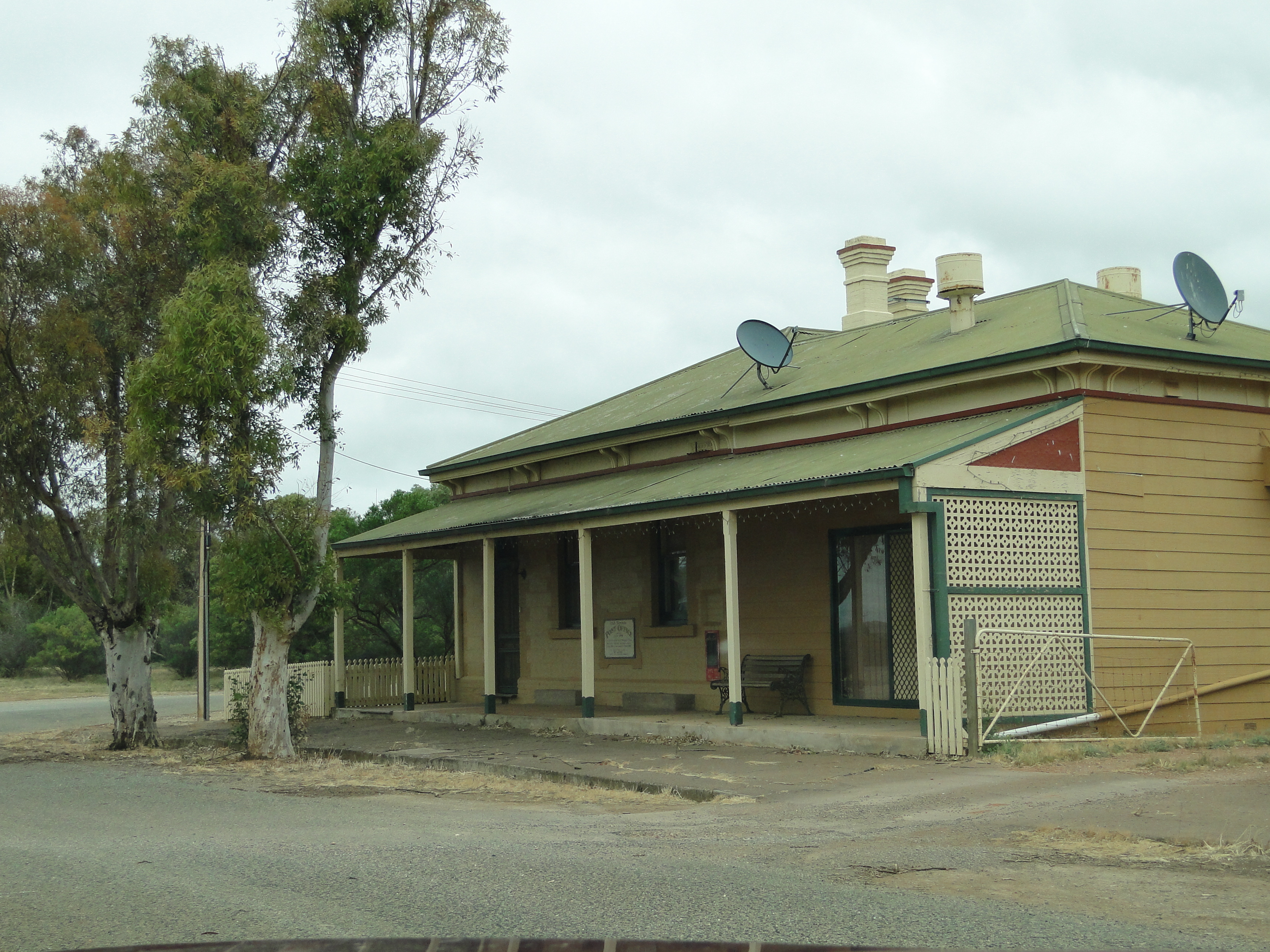
Post office (former)

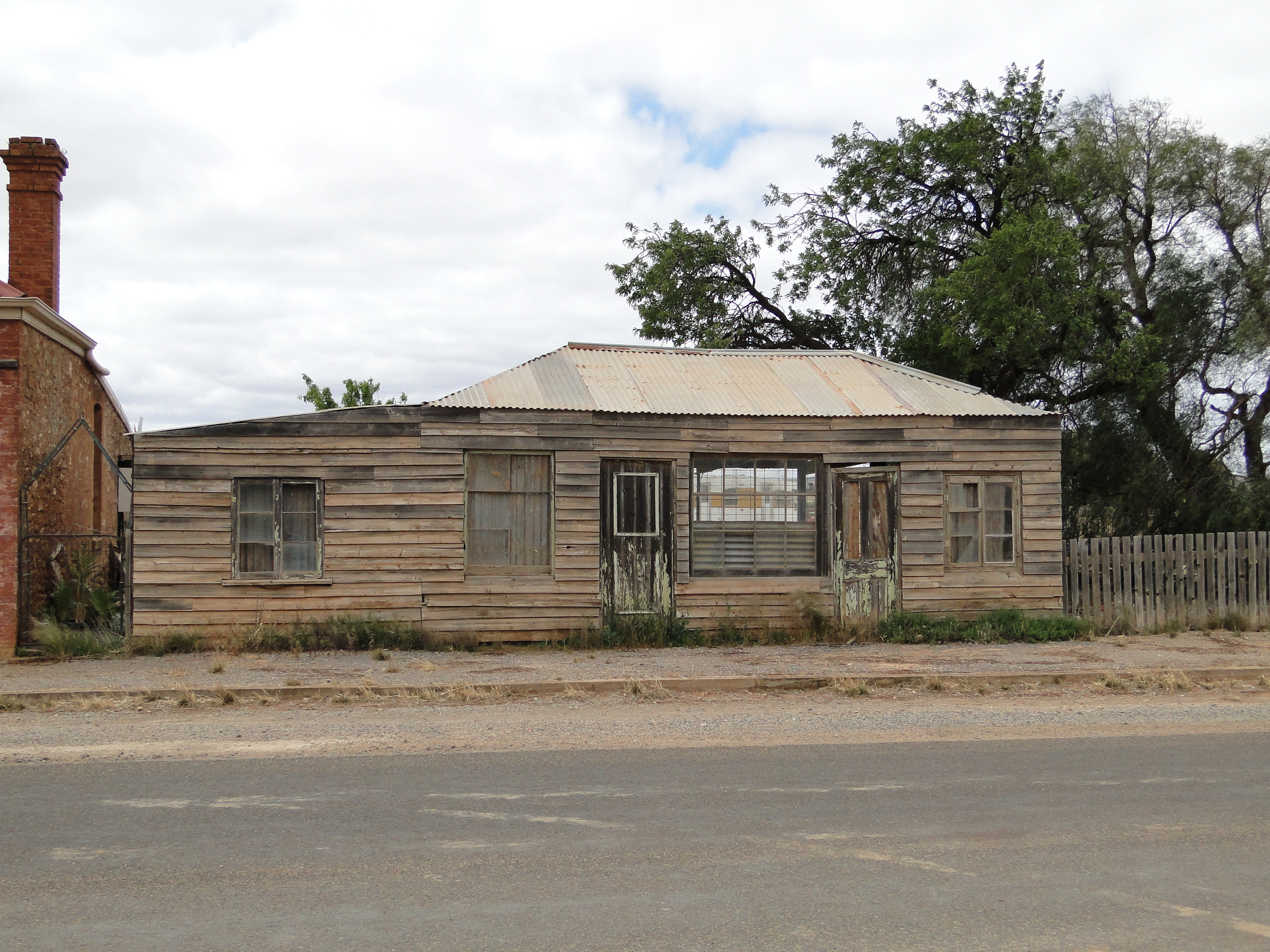
Old Shop

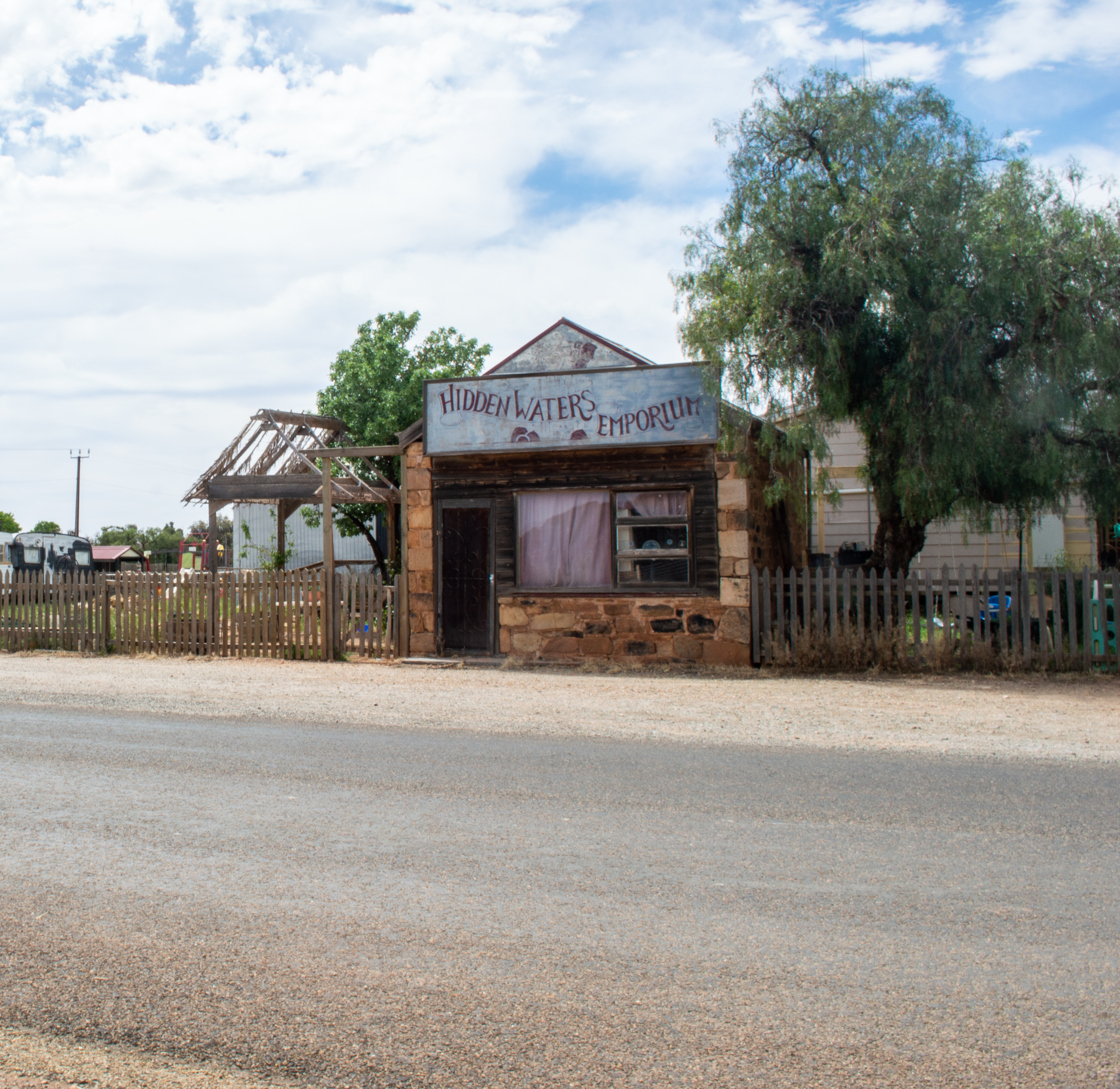
Old Shop

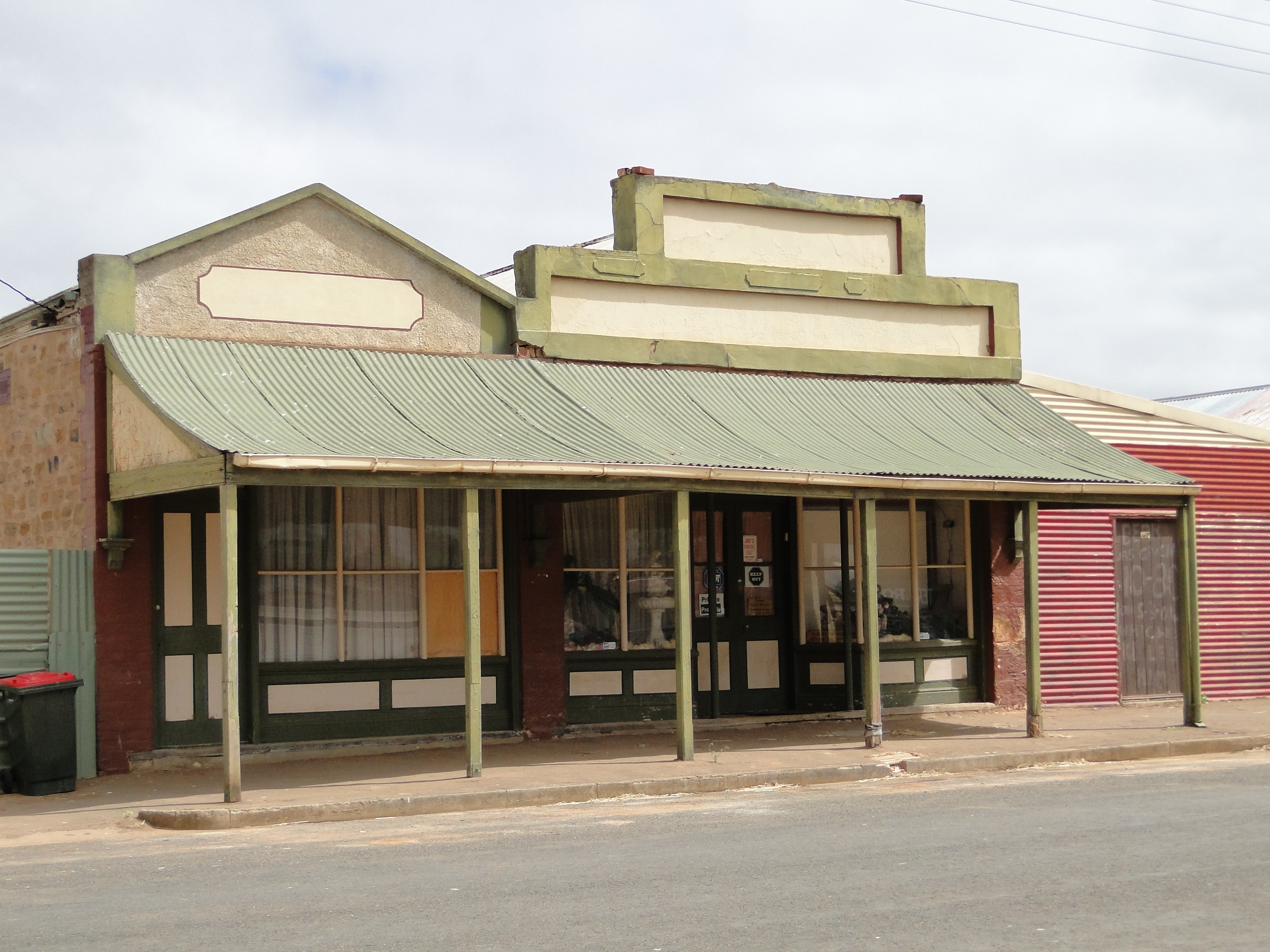
Old Shops

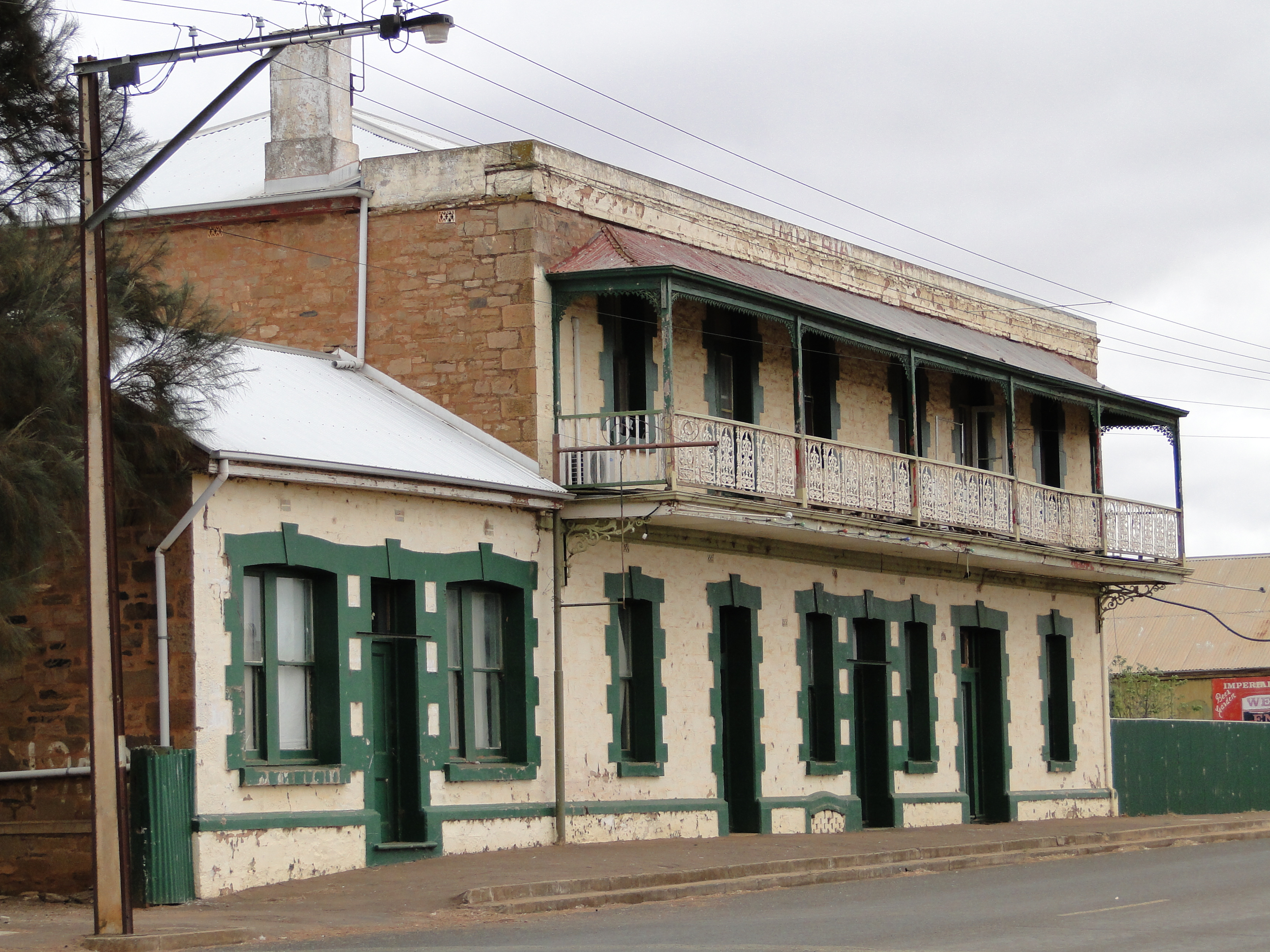
Imperial Hotel

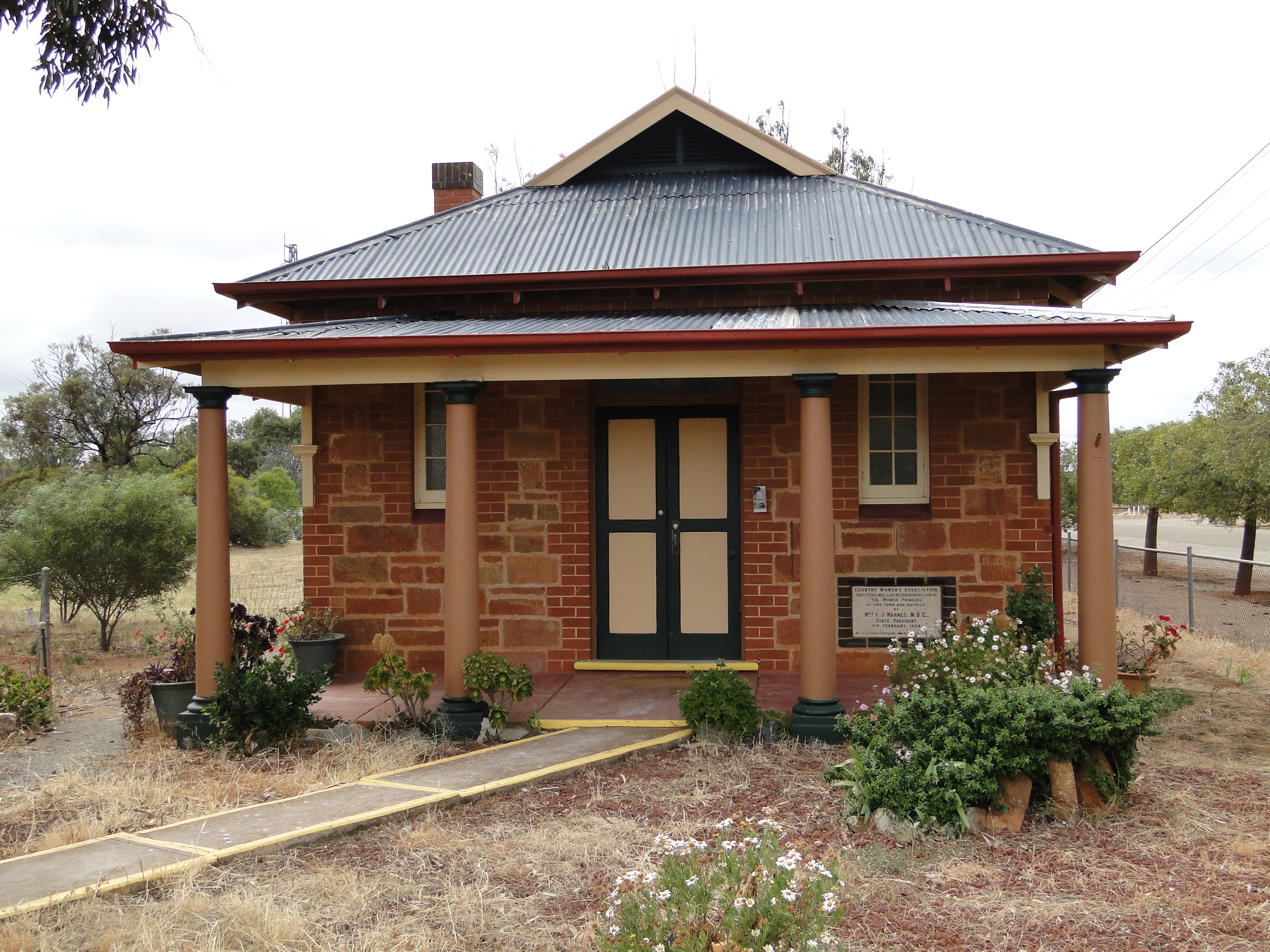
CWA

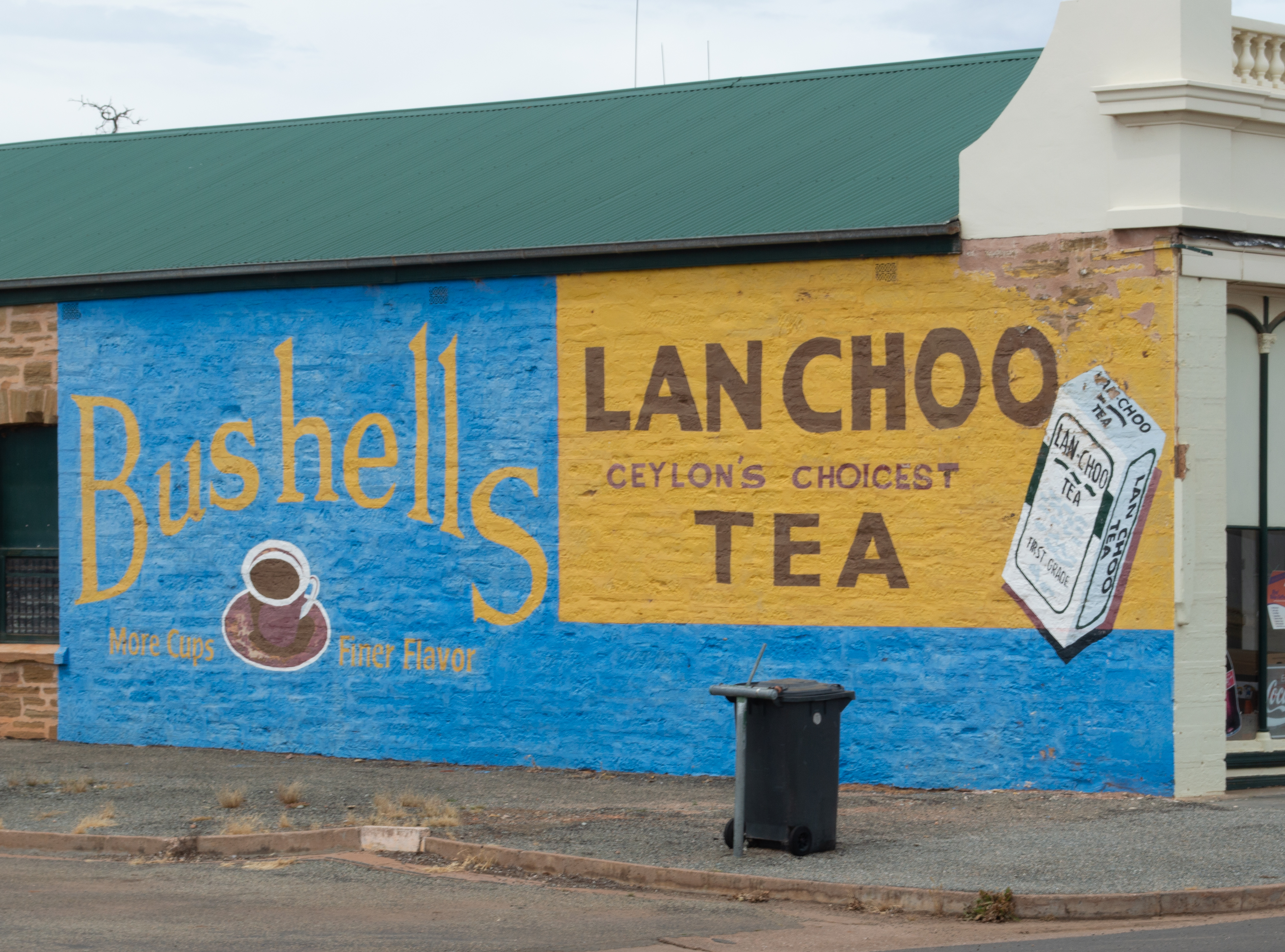
Old tea advertisement

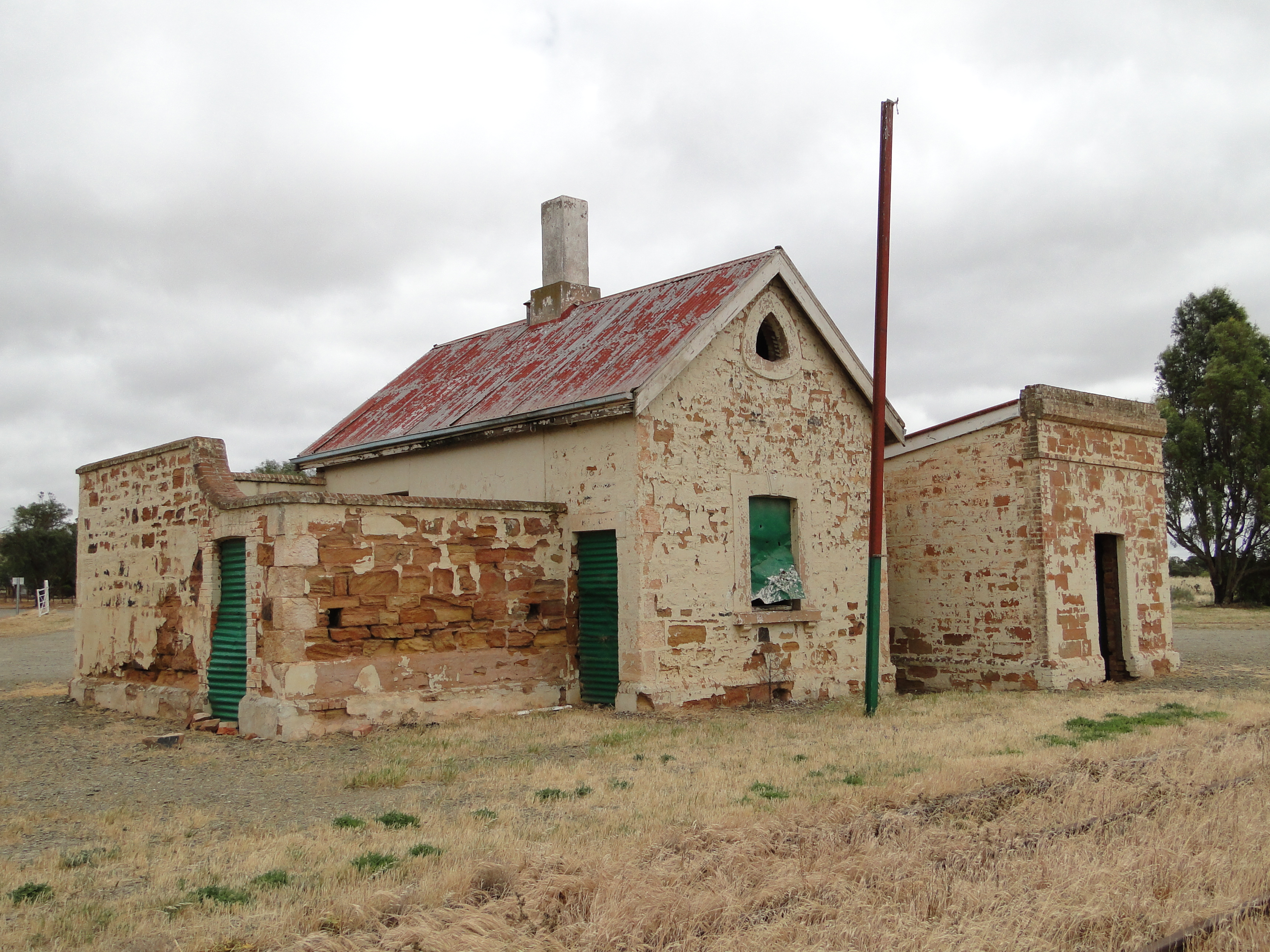
Portion of the remains of the Terowie railway station
