= German schools in South Australia =

During World War I, Australia experienced strong anti-German sentiment. South Australia had a substantial diaspora of German-speaking people derived from migrants from Germany and Poland during the 19th century. One of the consequences of the sentiment was that many German-sounding placenames were changed. Another consequence was that many Lutheran church schools which taught the children in German were encouraged and eventually forced to close or be taken over by the state.

The Colony of South Australia had been established in 1836. The first groups of German emigrants arrived in 1838, encouraged by the founders of the colony. They were escaping religious persecution in Prussia, and settling to establish a new life where they were free to practice their religion. The situation in Germany changed after 1840 but hard-working German settlers continued to be encouraged to migrate. The first German-language newspaper in South Australia was published from 1847. Many of these settlers took the Oath of Allegiance and became naturalised citizens so that they could buy land. German immigrant farmers and their descendants spread across the expanding colony, and others took up influential positions in Adelaide as well.

In June 1917, 49 schools received notices that they would be taken over by the Minister of Education with effect from 1 July that year. The German teachers were to be replaced by English teachers, if the school could not be closed completely and have the children sent to a nearby school. The action to close the schools was a consequence of the new Education Act 1915 passed by the South Australian Parliament late in 1915. Section 53 of the act required that at least 4 hours of teaching each school day be in English, and required head teachers to submit a monthly statutory declaration that this had been the case over the preceding month. The legislation specifically identified German as not being English.

== Schools closed ==
Some schools had voluntarily closed after the legislation was passed. The 49 schools that received notices to close from 1 July 1917 were at:

school	number of students
Martin Luther, Flinders Street, Adelaide	47
Australia Plains	38
Appila-Yarrowie	83
Bethany	60
Bethel	17
Blumberg	57
Bower	43
Crystal Brook West	10
Carlsruhe, Waterloo	44
Dalkey	22
St. John's, Dutton	34
Eden Valley	38
Emmaus	26
Emu Downs	20
St. John's, Eudunda	63
Ebenezer, Stockwell	85
Geranium Plains	19
Hahndorf	48
Trinity, Kapunda	37
St. Paul's, Kilkerran	30
St. John's, Kilkerran	20
Light's Pass	55
Lobethal	64
Lyndoch	25
Malvern, Cheltenham St	55
Mannum	26
Moculta	94
Monarto	9
Mount Torrens, Springhead	28
Murray Bridge	25
Nain	44
St. John's, Neale's Flat	13
St. Paul's, Neale's Flat	15
Neukirch	19
New Residence	30
North Rhine	34
Nott's Well	8
Palmer	18
Peter's Hill	27.
Point Pass	28
Rhine Villa	16
Rosenthal	27
St. Martini, Springton	35
Sedan	40
Tanunda	63
Lower Light	87
Robertstown	14
St Kitts, near Truro	19
Steinfeld, Hundred of Anna	(not stated).

In addition, the Koonibba Aborigines mission station, west of Ceduna, was not affected at that time.
