= Worlds End, South Australia =

Worlds End
- Town
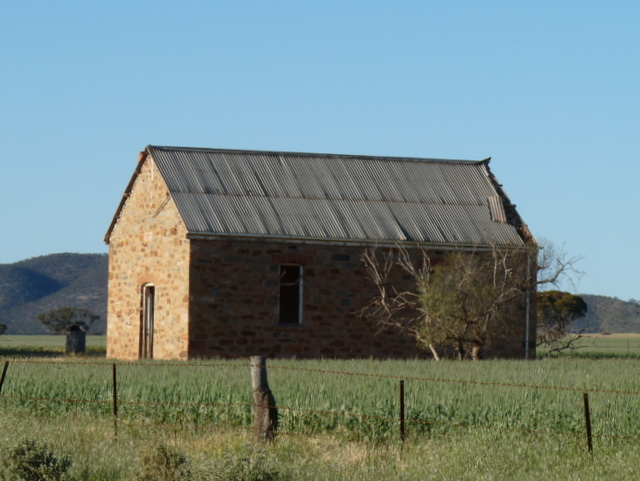
- The former Wesleyan Methodist Church at World's End

- Coordinates: 33.8°S 139°E
- Country: Australia
- State: South Australia
- LGA: Regional Council of Goyder
- Location: 18 km (11 mi) SE of Burra; 30 km (19 mi) N of Robertstown

Government
  - State electorate: Stuart
  - Federal division: Grey

Population
  - Total: 14 (SAL 2021)
- Time zone: UTC+9:30 (ACST)
  - Summer (DST): UTC+10:30 (ACDT)
- Postcode: 5381
Localities around Worlds End
| Burra | Baldina | Burra Eastern Districts |
| | Worlds End | Bundey |
| Emu Downs | Hallelujah Hills | Bright |

Worlds End is a locality 18 km southeast of Burra in South Australia. It also includes the area formerly known as Lapford.

The area was originally the territory of the Ngadjuri people. The government town of Lapford was surveyed in June 1877 around the Burra Creek, but never developed. Some blocks at Lapford were eventually sold in 1941, but the town was declared to have ceased to exist on 13 December 1962.

Worlds End Creek Post Office opened on 1 November 1876 and closed on 31 May 1971. Worlds End Creek School opened in 1888 and closed on 2 September 1944 due to a lack of teachers available. The Wesleyan Methodist church building was opened in 1889 and closed in 1975. It was used as a school for part of its history. Worlds End once had its own cricket and tennis teams.

The locality of Worlds End includes the Mimbara Conservation Park.
