= Narungga (disambiguation) =

The Narungga people are an Australian Aboriginal people.

Narungga may also refer to.

- Electoral district of Narungga, an electorate in Australia
- Narungga language, an Australian Aboriginal language
