= Hallelujah Hills, South Australia =

Hallelujah Hills South Australia
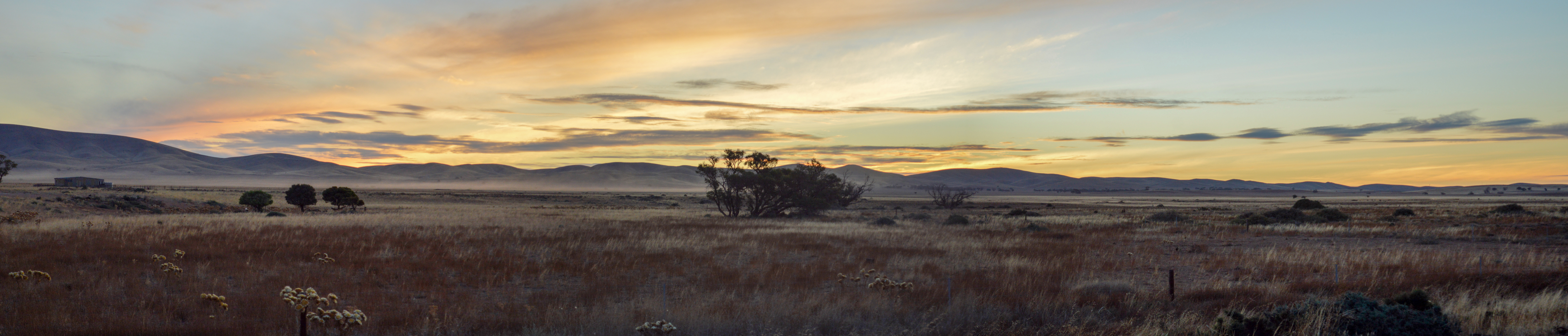
- Hills as seen from Worlds End at sunset

- Coordinates: 33.88°S 139.05°E
- Population: 0 (SAL 2021)
- Postcode(s): 5381
- Location: 37 km (23 mi) north of Eudunda
- LGA(s): Regional Council of Goyder
- State electorate(s): Stuart
- Federal division(s): Grey
Localities around Hallelujah Hills:
Burra	Worlds End	Worlds End
Emu Downs	Hallelujah Hills	Bright
Emu Downs	Robertstown	Bright
- Footnotes: Coordinates

Hallelujah Hills is a rural locality in the Mid North region of South Australia, situated in the Regional Council of Goyder.

The area was originally the territory of the Ngadjuri people. It includes the 413 ha former Hallelujah Hills pastoral property, now held for conservation purposes by World's End Conservation Pty Ltd. World's End describes the site as "the last range of hills and ridges between the mid-north and the mallee plains", and home to rare and threatened flora and fauna. It is home to a large population of the endangered Spiller's wattle (Acacia spilleriana).

The formal gazetted locality of Hallelujah Hills was established in August 2000. Worlds End Highway marks the eastern boundary of the locality. Hallelujah Hills Road is the only road through Hallelujah Hills itself.
