= Geranium Plains, South Australia =

Geranium Plains South Australia
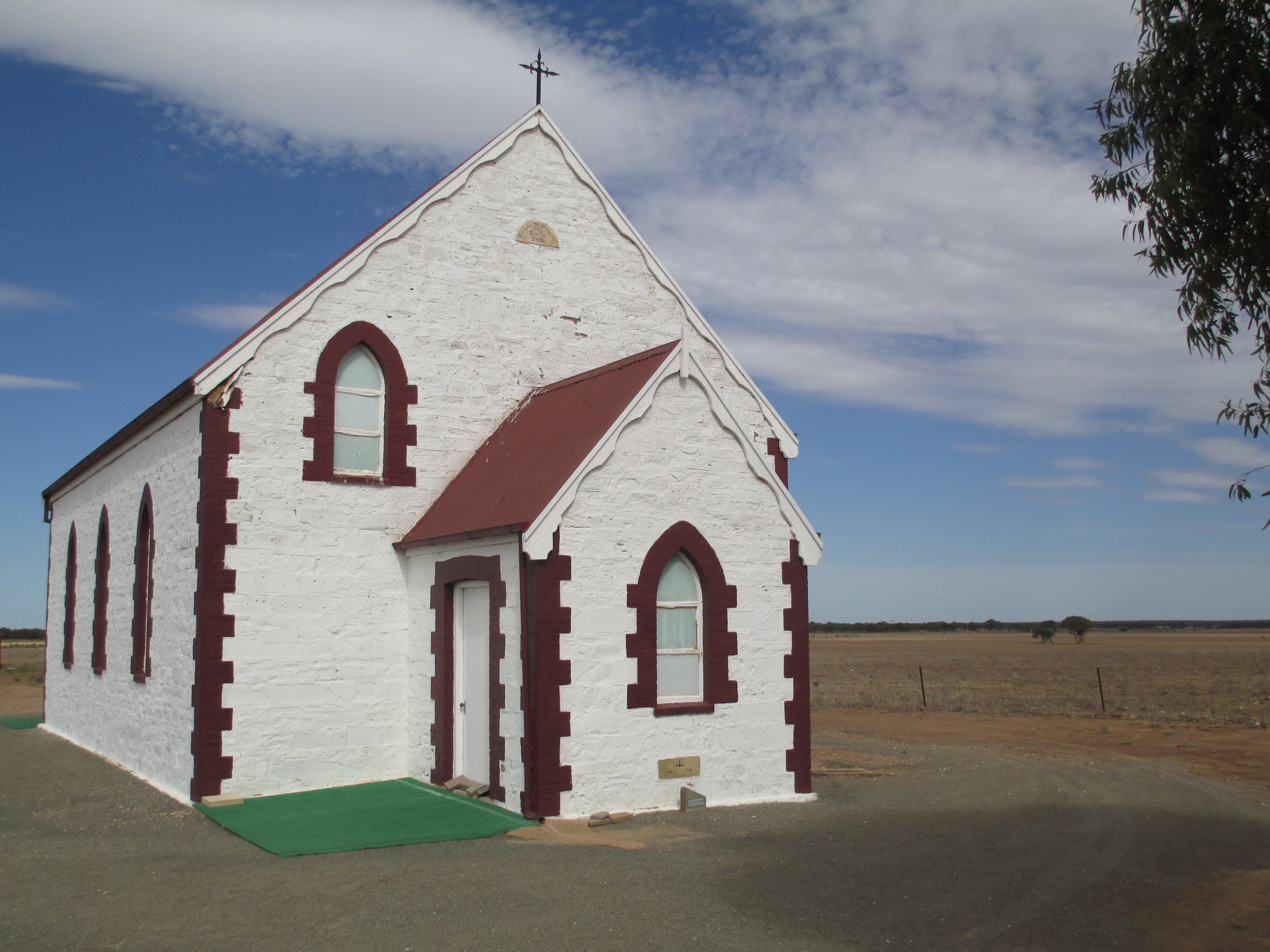
- St Stephen's Lutheran Church

- Coordinates: 33.98°S 139.21°E
- Population: 5 (SAL 2021)
- Postcode(s): 5381
- LGA(s): Regional Council of Goyder
- Region: Mid North
- State electorate(s): Stuart
- Federal division(s): Grey
Localities around Geranium Plains:
Bright		Bundey
Robertstown	Geranium Plains
Rocky Plain	Australia Plains	Bower

Geranium Plains is a small town in the Regional Council of Goyder in South Australia. The post office opened in 1894, but has since closed. There was a proposal to rename it to Iperta in 1916, but this did not go ahead.

The area was originally the territory of the Ngadjuri people. The present boundaries for the Bounded Locality were set in August 2000.

St Stephen's Lutheran church opened in 1900, and as of 2016 holds services twice monthly. It also hosted the state school from 1901 to 1917. It is now part of the "Eudunda Robertstown Lutheran Parish", which includes Lutheran churches at Robertstown, Point Pass, Geranium Plains, Eudunda, Neales Flat and Peep Hill.
