= Australia Plains, South Australia =

Australia Plains
- Town
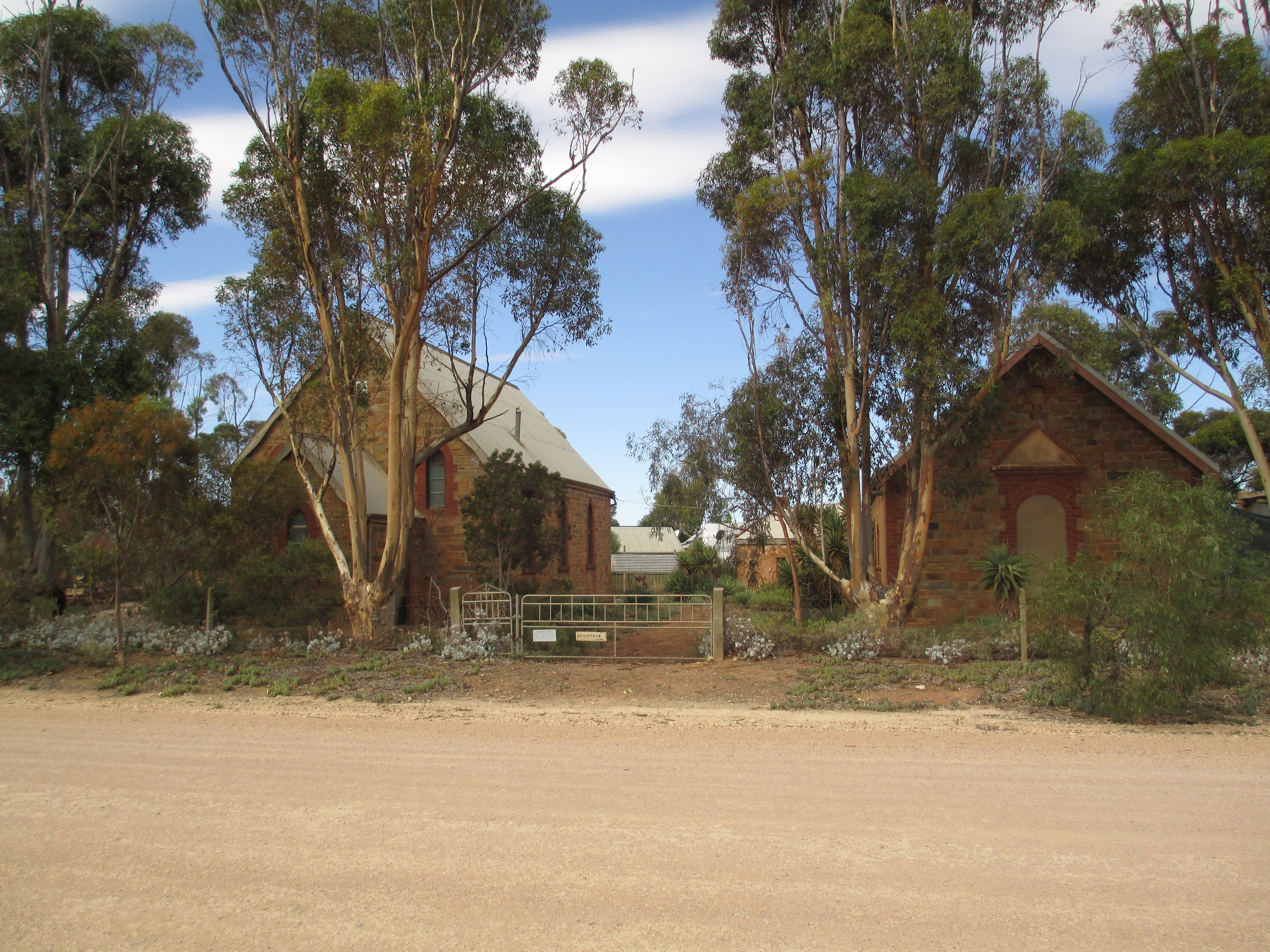
- Former Church (left) and school

- Coordinates: 34.097°S 139.15°E
- Country: Australia
- State: South Australia
- LGA: Regional Council of Goyder

Government
  - State electorate: Stuart
  - Federal division: Grey

Population
  - Total: 41 (SAL 2021)
- Postcode: 5374
Localities around Australia Plains
Robertstown	Rocky Plain	Geranium Plains
Point Pass	Australia Plains	Bower
Eudunda	Peep Hill	Sutherlands

Australia Plains is a rural locality in the Mid North region of South Australia, situated 127 km northeast of Adelaide in the Regional Council of Goyder. As of 2021, the population of Australia Plains was 41.

== Name ==
The locality drew its name from "Australia Huts" which appeared on old pastoral lease plans of the area. Australia huts were pine and daub huts used by drovers and shepherds.

== History ==
Australia Plains is located on the traditional lands of the Ngadjuri people. The Ngadjuri people have been largely overlooked in the histories of colonisation and the subsequent dispossession from their traditional lands.

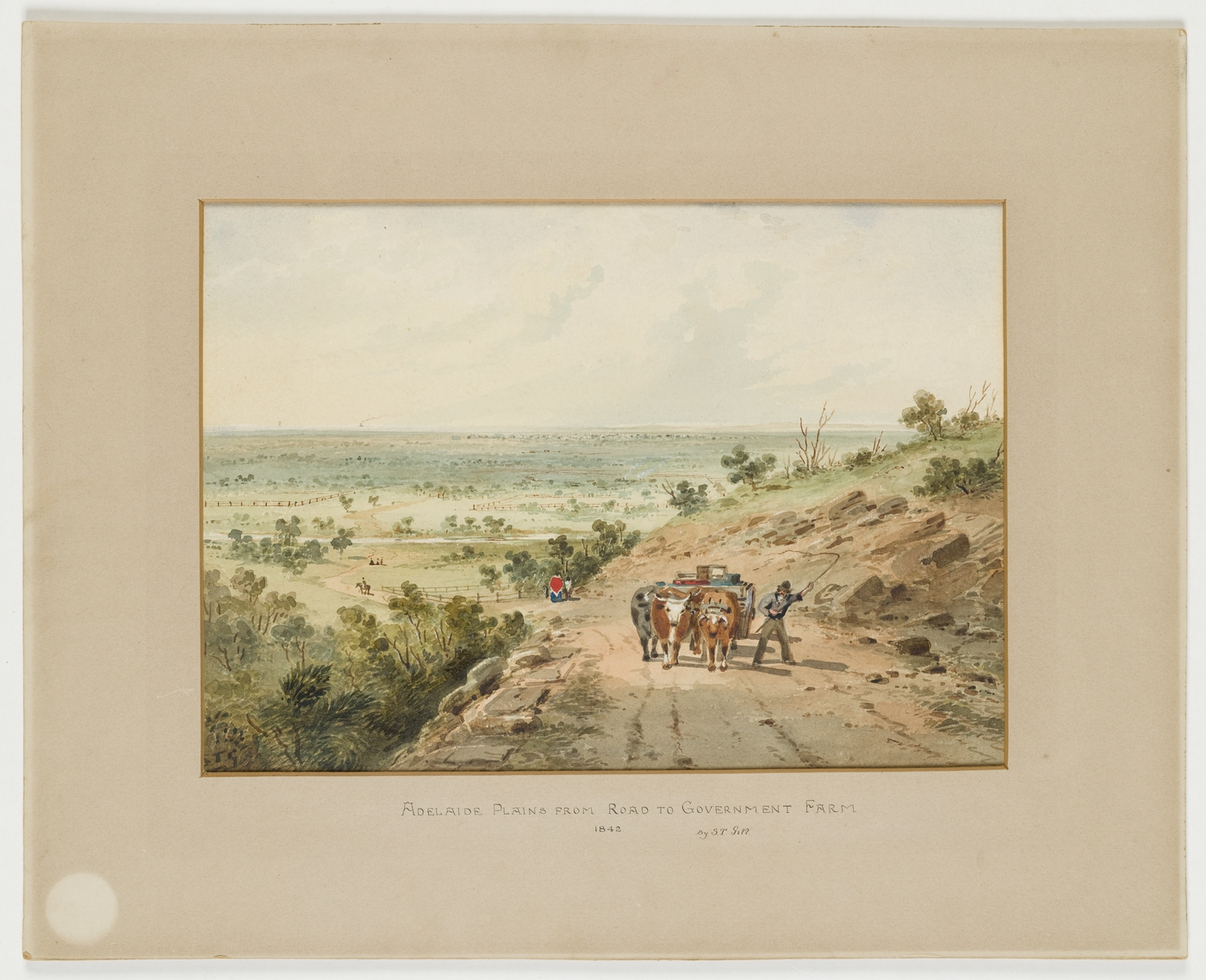
“Adelaide Plains from Road to Government Farm” by Samuel Thomas Gill, 1842

In the 1850s, pastoralists, including the Duttons of Anlaby, took up leasehold lands in Australia Plains. While farmers hesitated to occupy these less favourable lands situated beyond Goyder's Line, the settlement of Australia Plains gradually came into existence during the early 1880s.

A general store and saddlery opened in 1876. Australia Plains Post Office operated from 1 April 1882 to 31 May 1971. In 1883, a German Lutheran church and school were established. Later, in 1894, the church was replaced by St Johannis Lutheran Church. During World War I, the school had to close down due to the prevailing anti-German sentiment at the time. It was replaced by a public school which operated from 1917 until 1956. St Johannis Lutheran Church closed in the 1970s, and is now a private residence.

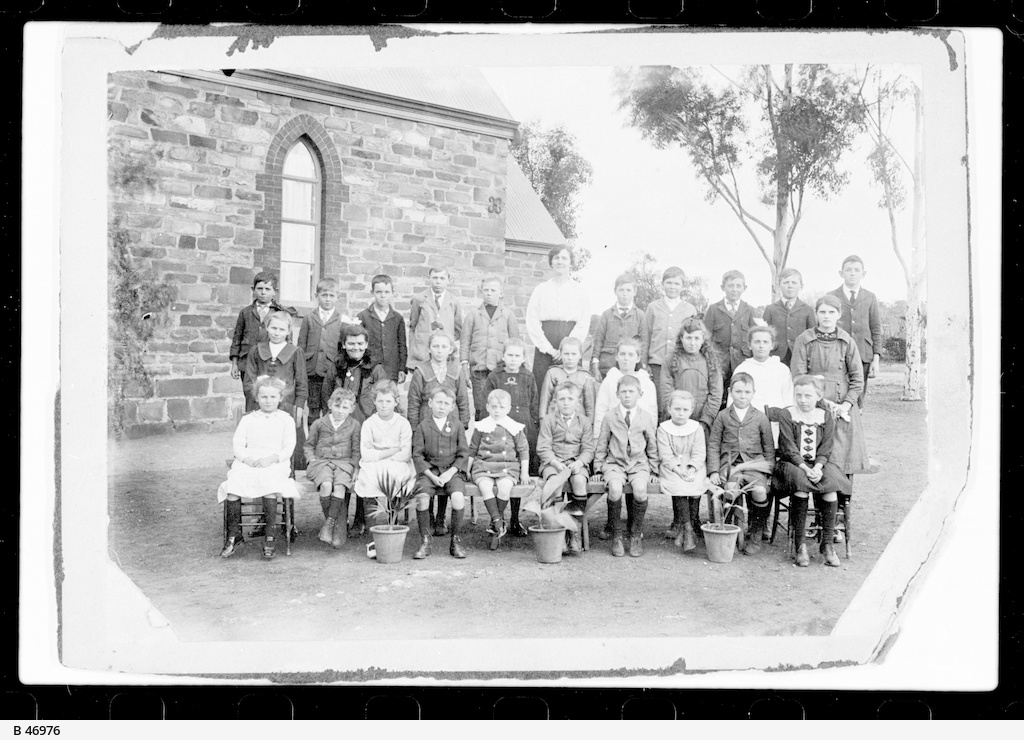
Pupils and teachers outside Australia Plains School, 1921

== Demographics ==
In the 2021 Census, Australia Plains recorded a population of 41 people, with 60.5% being male and 39.5% female. The median age in this area was 40. There were 13 families and a total of 16 private dwellings. On average, each household consisted of 2.7 people. The median weekly household income was $850, while the median monthly mortgage repayments were $1,280. The median weekly rent was $233. Additionally, there was an average of 2.5 motor vehicles per dwelling in this region.

== Today ==
As of 2023, Australia Plains no longer has any amenities.

The Australia Plains Solar Project is an ongoing initiative that involves the installation of ground-mounted solar panels covering an area of 340 hectares. Located in Australia Plains, this project aims to harness solar energy and generate electricity. It is currently in progress and is scheduled to be completed in 2023.
