= Nukunu language =

Australian Aboriginal language

Nukunu
- Native to: Australia
- Region: South Australia
- Ethnicity: Nukunu
- Extinct: c. 2000
- Revival: 11-50 (2019)
- Language family: Pama–Nyungan: Thura-Yura; (unclassified); Nukunu
- Writing system: Latin

Language codes
- ISO 639-3: nnv
- Glottolog: nugu1241
- AIATSIS: L4
- ELP: Nukunu

Nukunu (or Nugunu or many other names: see below) is a moribund Australian Aboriginal language spoken by Nukunu people on Yorke Peninsula, South Australia. As of 2017, there is a revival and maintenance programme under way for the language.

== Names ==
This language has been known by many names by neighbouring tribes and Australianists, including:

- Nukuna, Nokunna, Noocoona, Nookoona, Nuguna, Nukana, Nukunnu, Nukunu, Njuguna
- Doora
- Pukunna
- Tjura, Tyura
- Wallaroo, Warra
- Wongaidya (from wangkatya, present tense form of verb 'to speak')

== Classification ==
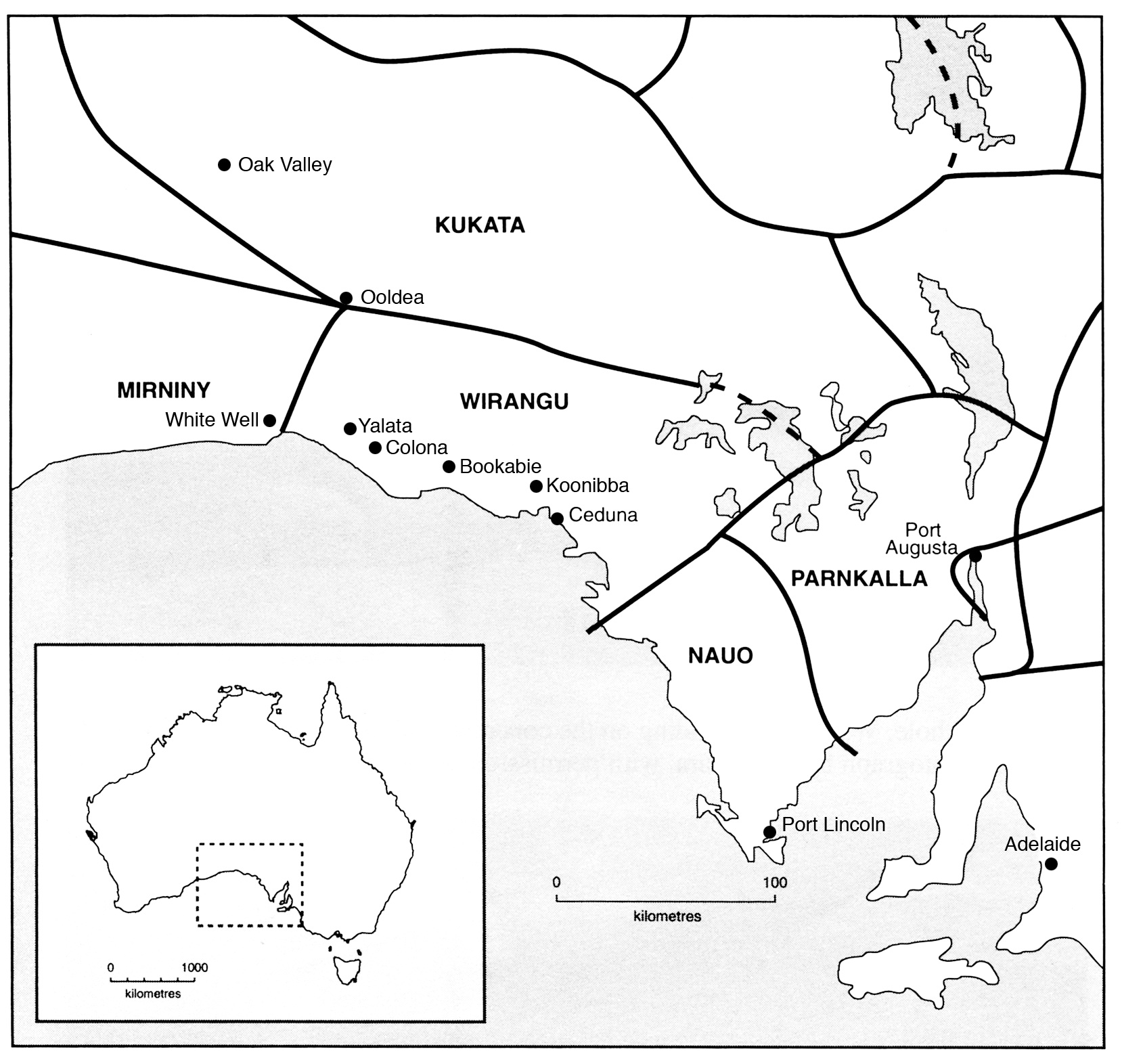
Aboriginal languages of South Australia

Nukunu is a Pama–Nyungan language, closely related to neighboring languages in the Miru cluster like Narungga, Kaurna, and Ngadjuri.

== Phonology ==
=== Vowels ===
Nukunu has three different vowels with contrastive long and short lengths (a, i, u, a:, i:, u:).

	Front	Back
High	i iː	u uː
Low	a aː	

=== Consonants ===
The Nukunu consonantal inventory is typical for a Pama–Nyungan language, with six places of articulation for stops and nasals. There are three rhotics in the language.

		Peripheral		Laminal		Apical	
		Labial	Velar	Dental	Palatal	Alveolar	Retroflex
Stop	Voiceless	p	k	t̪	c	t	ʈ
Stop	Voiced						(ɖ)
Nasal		m	ŋ	n̪	ɲ	n	ɳ
Lateral				l̪	ʎ	l	ɭ
Tap						ɾ	
Trill						r	
Approximant		w			j		ɻ

A phonemic voicing contrast exists in Nukunu, but it has only been observed in the retroflex stop series. An example demonstrating such a contrast intervocalically is kurdi (phlegm, IPA ['kuɖi]) and kurti (quandong, IPA ['kuʈi]).

=== History ===
In contrast with other Thura–Yura languages, Nukunu did not partake in either the initial th- lenition before vowels or the lenition of initial k- before vowels.
