= Peep Hill, South Australia =

Peep Hill South Australia
- Coordinates: 34°9′S 139°9′E
- Population: 22 (SAL 2021)
- Postcode(s): 5374
- Elevation: 283 m (928 ft)
- LGA(s): Regional Council of Goyder
- State electorate(s): Stuart
- Federal division(s): Grey
Localities around Peep Hill:
Eudunda	Australia Plains	Australia Plains
Eudunda	Peep Hill	Sutherlands
Eudunda	Eudunda	Neales Flat
- Footnotes: Coordinates Elevation

Peep Hill is a rural locality in the Mid North region of South Australia, situated 120km north-east of Adelaide in the Regional Council of Goyder. It was established in August 2000, when boundaries were formalised for the "long established local name". As of 2021, Peep Hill has a population of 22 residents.

== Etymology ==
Peep Hill is reported to be named for "a round hill in the last range towards the east".

== History ==
Peep Hill is located on the traditional lands of the Ngadjuri people. The Ngadjuri have been largely overlooked in the histories of colonisation and the subsequent dispossession from their traditional lands.

In 1876, farmer Johann Gottlieb Dohnt was recorded as being one of the first European settlers at Peep Hill. Two years later, in 1878, Peep Hill was described as "no township, but simply a small settlement."

The Peep Hill School, originally named the Deep Creek School, was established in 1883. It closed down in 1939 due to small student numbers. The school building was demolished in 1950 and, by 1986, it was noted to be a pile of rubble.

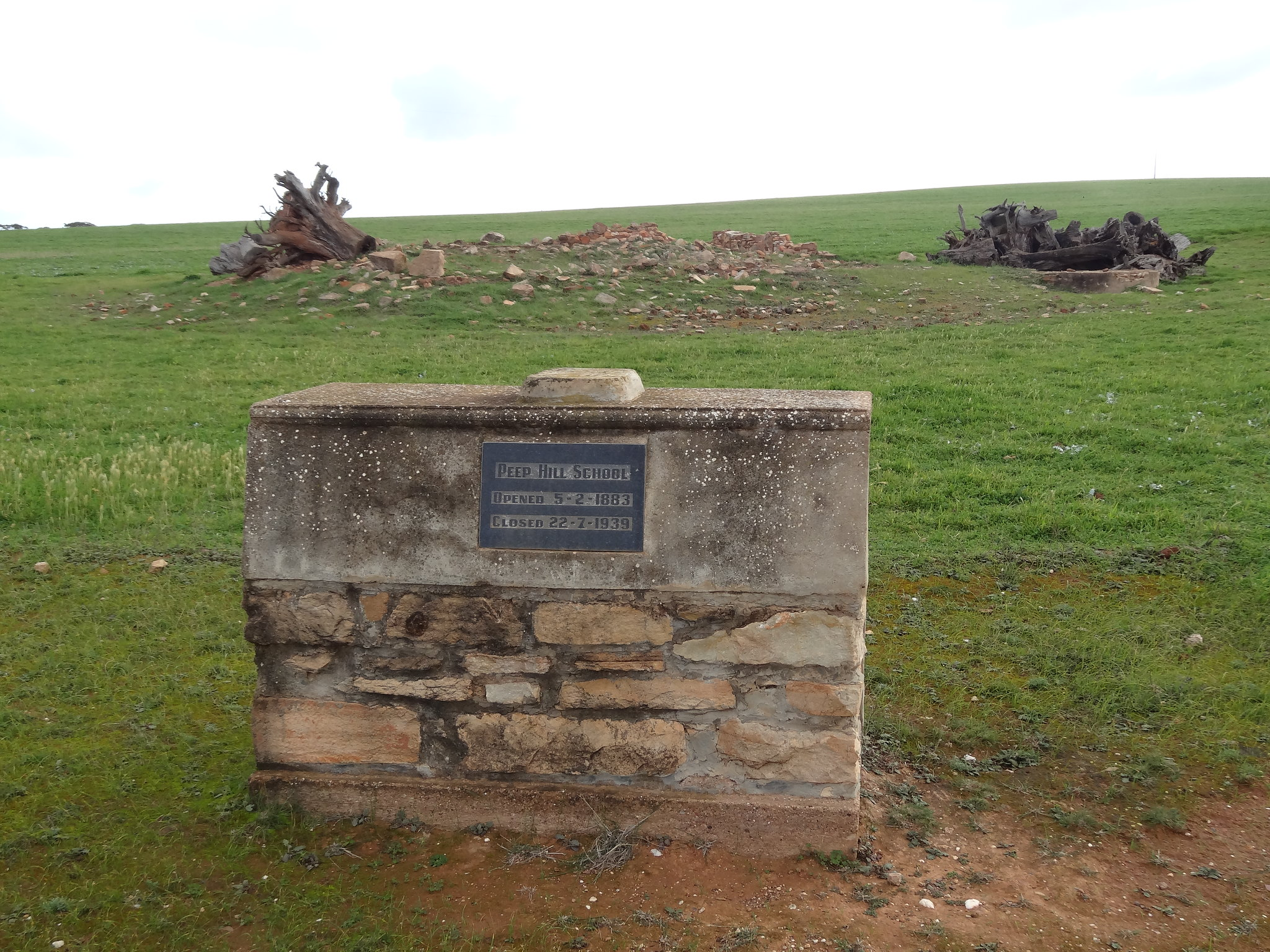
Peep Hill School memorial and ruins

A Lutheran congregation was officially formed in Peep Hill in 1888, although services had been conducted there since 1880. Initially, the congregation worshipped in the school until St Michael's Lutheran Church was opened in 1890. The church underwent renovations in 1936 and transitioned from the Point Pass Parish to the Eudunda Parish in 1966. The church continues in operation, and is now part of the Eudunda Robertstown Lutheran Parish.

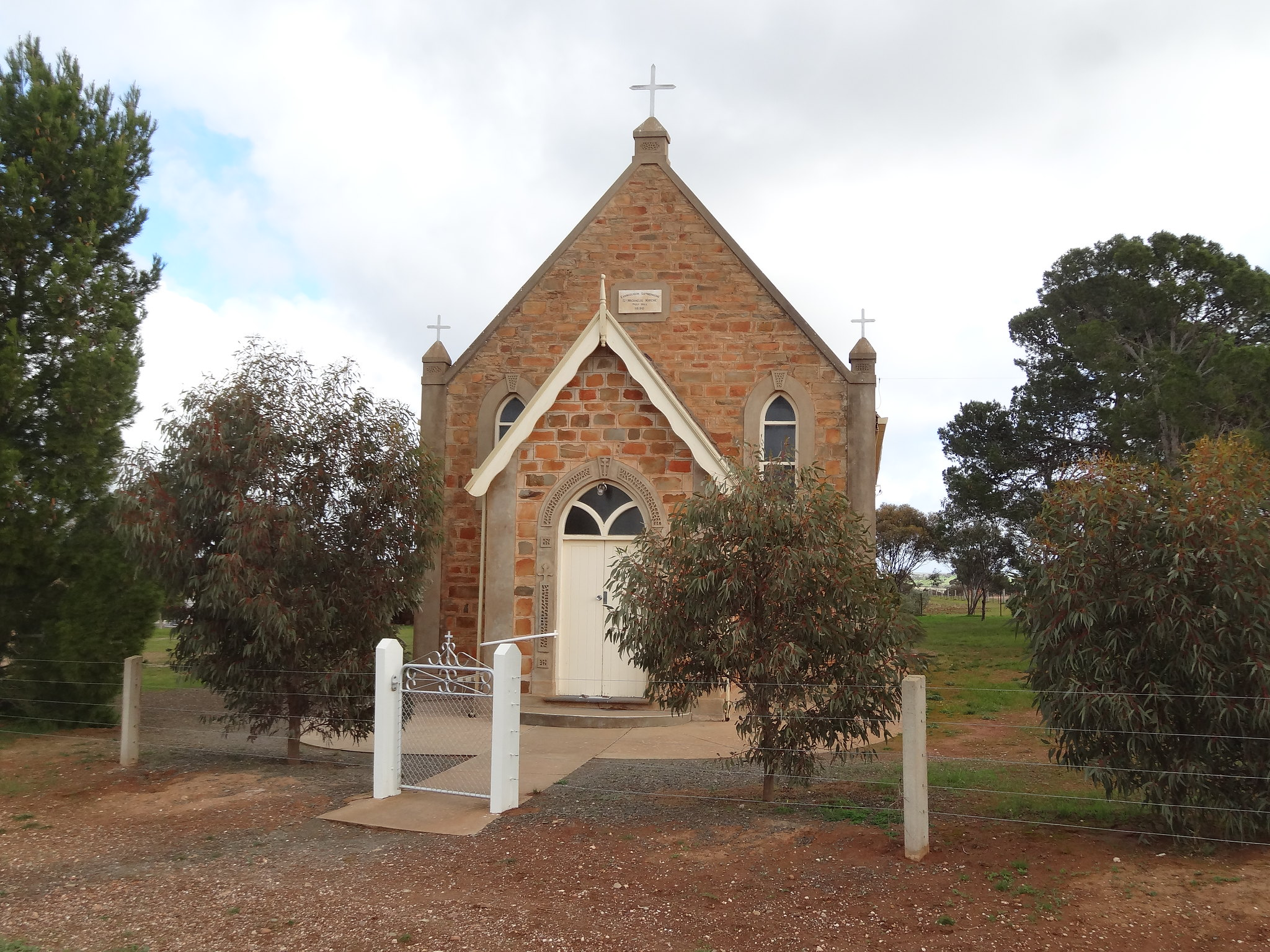
St Michael's Lutheran Church

Peep Hill Post Office opened on 1 July 1883 and closed on 1 November 1930. The town formerly had a railway siding on the Morgan line, the Deep Creek station.

== Demographics ==
As of 2021, Peep Hill is a small community with a total population of 22 people. The majority of the population is male, accounting for 64.3%, while females make up 35.7% of the population. The median age of the residents is 44 years. The community has a total of 9 private dwellings, with an average of 2.6 people per household. On average, each dwelling in Peep Hill has 4.3 motor vehicles. The median weekly household income is $1,374, and the median monthly mortgage repayments are $999.

== Flora ==
Dodonaea subglandulifera, also known as Peep Hill hop bush, is a species of plant in the Sapindaceae family. It is native to south-eastern South Australia. Peep Hill hop bush is listed as nationally endangered, with an estimated 45,000 to 50,000 plants remaining.

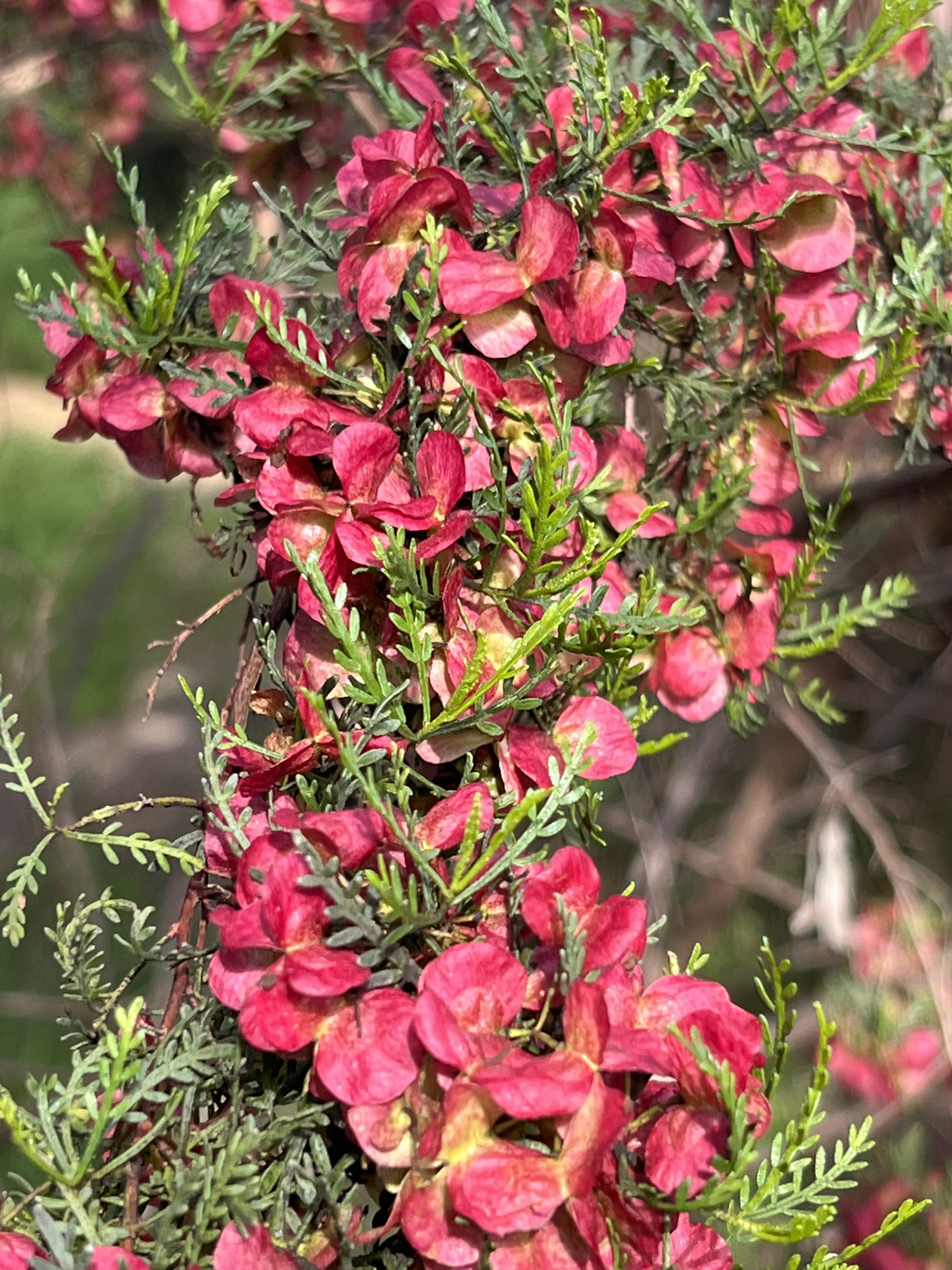
Peep Hill hop bush
