= Bower, South Australia =

Bower
- Town
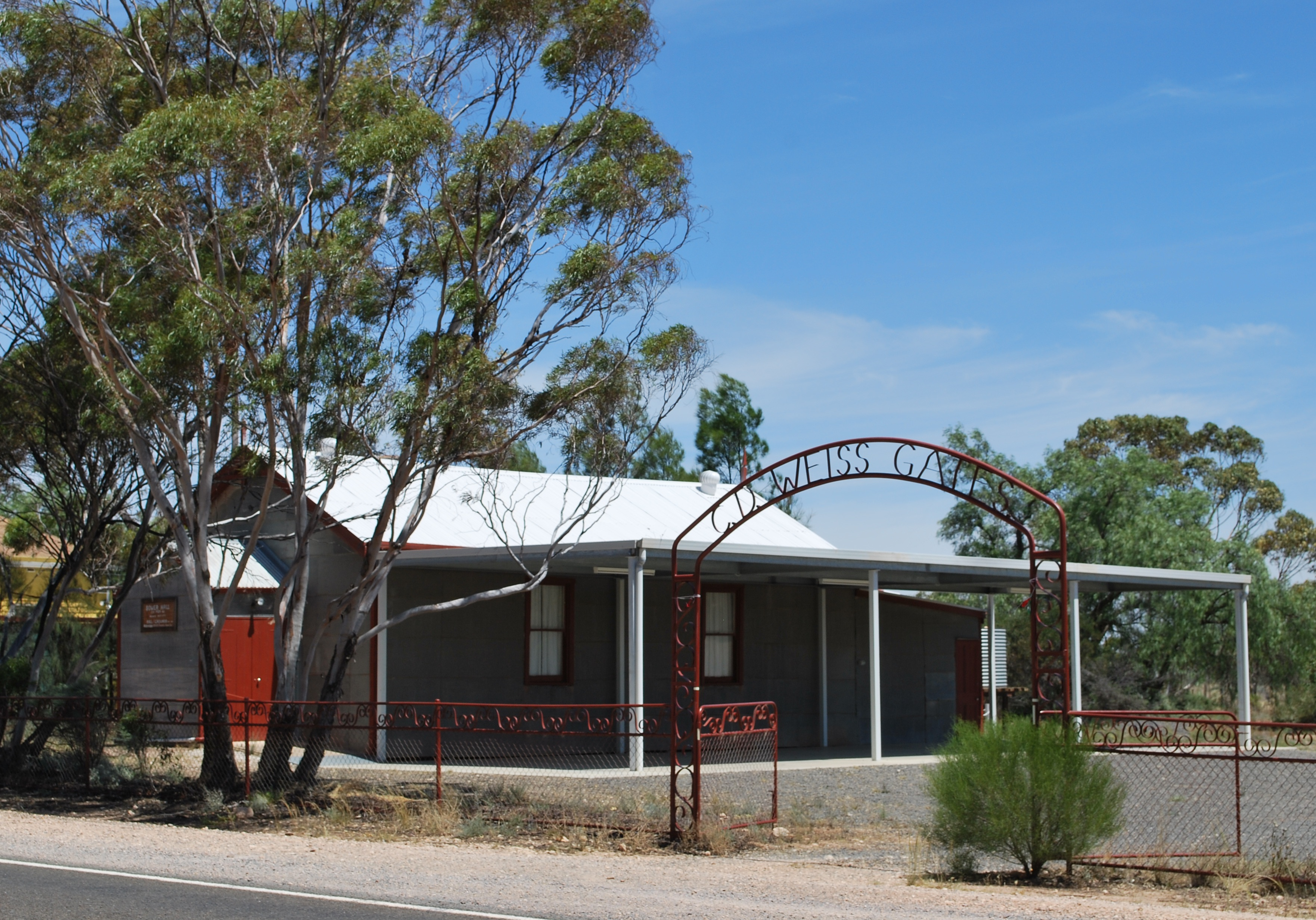
- Public hall

- Coordinates: 34°07′16″S 139°21′18″E
- Country: Australia
- State: South Australia
- LGAs: Regional Council of Goyder; Mid Murray Council
- Location: 130 km (81 mi) NW of Adelaide; 75 km (47 mi) E of Waikerie; 27 km (17 mi) W of Eudunda

Government
  - State electorate: Stuart
  - Federal division: Barker, Grey

Population
  - Total: 41 (SAL 2021)
- Postcode: 5374
Localities around Bower
Geranium Plains, Rocky Plain	Bundey	Maude, Beatty
Australia Plains	Bower	Mount Mary
Sutherlands	Brownlow

Bower is a town in South Australia, approximately halfway between Eudunda and Morgan on the Thiele Highway.

The area was originally the territory of the Ngadjuri people. The name Bower honours David Bower, a South Australian Member of Parliament (1865 – 1887) who donated land in the state for institutional purposes. By 1916, Bower had become a dispatch centre for mallee timber and roots. These were loaded at the railway station on the Morgan railway line and sent to Adelaide. Bower Public School operated in the town between 1917 and 1960, replacing an earlier Lutheran school forcibly closed during World War I.

The historic Lime Kiln Ruins on Bower Boundary Road are listed on the South Australian Heritage Register.
