= Bundey, South Australia =

Bundey South Australia
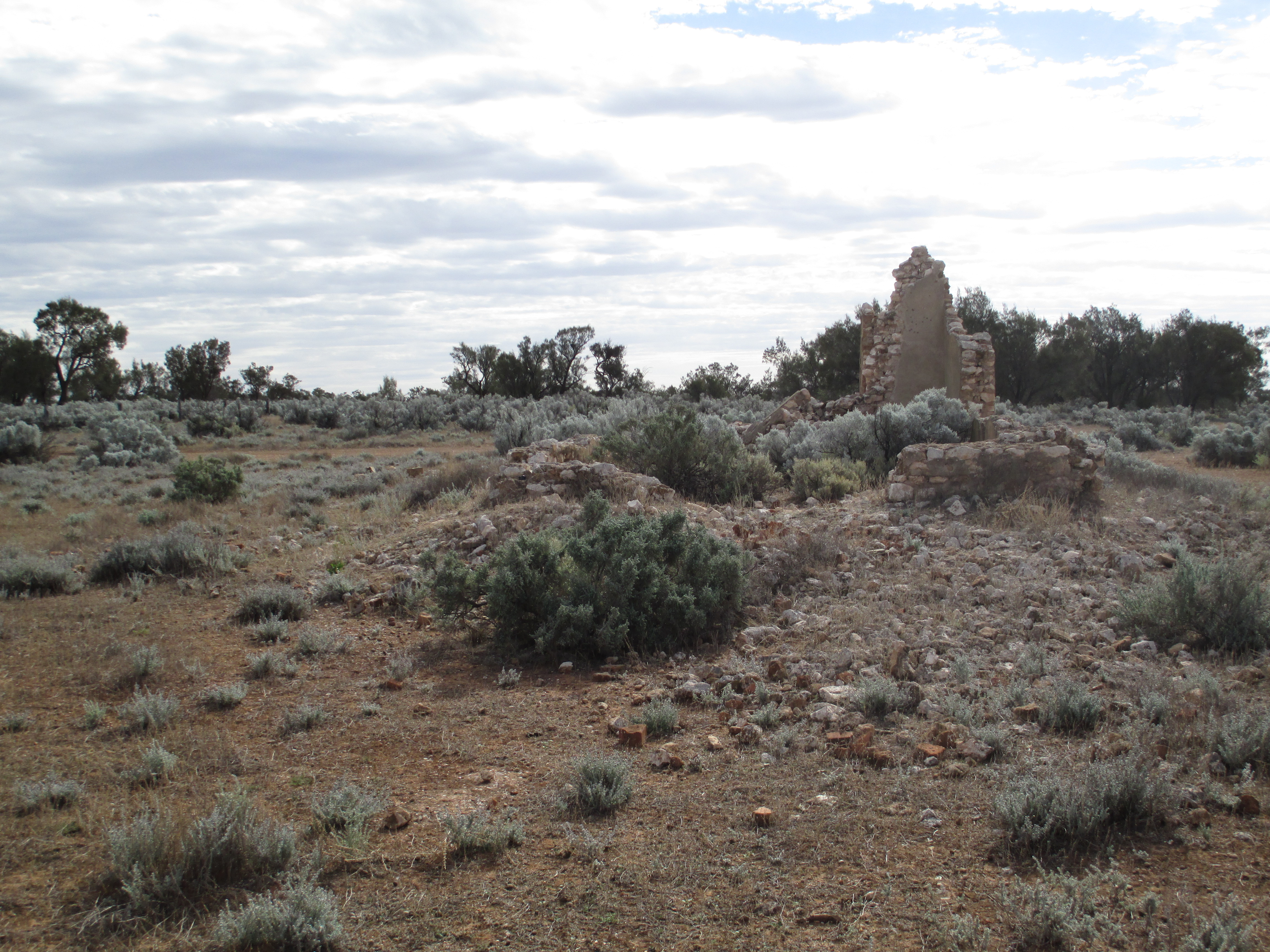
- The ruins of the Immanuel Lutheran Church at Bundey, which was last used in 1925

- Coordinates: 33.89°S 139.30°E
- Population: 0 (SAL 2021)
- Postcode(s): 5320
- LGA(s): Regional Council of Goyder
- State electorate(s): Stuart
- Federal division(s): Grey
Localities around Bundey:
Worlds End	Burra Eastern Districts	Warnes
Bright	Bundey	Maude
Geranium Plains	Bower	Beatty

Bundey is a locality in the Mid North region of South Australia. It is located on Goyder's Line, on the plains between Burra and Morgan in the Regional Council of Goyder. The bounded locality of Bundey corresponds to the boundaries of the cadastral Hundred of Bundey, except for the southwestern corner of the Hundred which is the northeastern corner of the locality of Geranium Plains. Bundey was named in 1878 for politician William Henry Bundey.

The area was originally the territory of the Ngadjuri people. Following European settlement, it was surveyed into 500 acre blocks and taken up by farmers in 1879. Bundey Post Office opened on 1 May 1882 and closed on 1 October 1901.

Bundey Immanuel Lutheran Church was established in 1889. The first building was pug and daub. After storm damage, a more substantial building of limestone and bricks replaced it in either 1900 or 1905. The church building also served as a school during the week, with lessons in a mixture of German and English, until its forced closure by the state government in 1917. The church itself closed in January 1925, and the building is now an abandoned ruin.

== See also ==
- List of cities and towns in South Australia
