= Bright, South Australia =

Bright South Australia
- Coordinates: 33.8983°S 139.135840°E
- Population: 18 (SAL 2021)
- Postcode(s): 5381
- LGA(s): Regional Council of Goyder
- State electorate(s): Stuart
- Federal division(s): Grey
Localities around Bright:
Worlds End	Worlds End	Bundey
Hallelujah Hills	Bright	Bundey
Robertstown	Rocky Plain	Geranium Plains
- Footnotes: Coordinates

Bright is a rural locality in the Mid North region of South Australia, situated in the Regional Council of Goyder. It was established in August 2000, when boundaries were formalised for the "long established local name". It incorporates most of the cadastral Hundred of Bright, which was proclaimed on 17 June 1875 and named for politician Henry Edward Bright.

The area was originally the territory of the Ngadjuri people. It was settled "well before 1900". The area faced challenges in its use for farming, with mallee cutting needed for preparing land for cropping into the 1930s, and erosion becoming a problem in the 1930s and 1940s. The eastern parts of the hundred received reticulated water in 1959, electricity in 1963, and telephone service in 1964.

Bright Post Office opened on 1 September 1891, was downgraded to a receiving office on 19 May 1917, and closed altogether on 31 October 1917. Bright School opened in 1899 in a rented house, moved to a permanent building soon after, and moved again to a new building, described as "a galvanised iron-clad building, lined inside with ceiling board [and] insulated with sea weed" in 1911. It was closed due to low attendance on 31 December 1955.

The Upper Bright Zion Lutheran Church opened in 1887 on what is now the Worlds End Highway, and closed in 1960. A Lutheran school operated at the church from 1887 until its closure for lack of students in 1913. The church has been demolished, but the associated cemetery still survives.
