= Dalkey, South Australia =

Dalkey South Australia
- Coordinates: 34.19°S 138.44°E
- Population: 16 (SAL 2021)
- Established: 1856
- Postcode(s): 5461
- Location: 8 km (5 mi) south of Balaklava
- LGA(s): Wakefield Regional Council
- State electorate(s): Frome
- Federal division(s): Grey
Localities around Dalkey:
	Balaklava
	Dalkey
Erith		Hoskin Corner

Dalkey is a locality in the Mid North of South Australia. It was established as a private subdivision of section 171 in the Hundred of Dalkey on the main road from Adelaide to Balaklava. It is named for the Hundred of Dalkey which in turn was named after Dalkey in Ireland. The boundaries of the locality were defined in 2000 for the long-established name.

== History ==
The Dalkey area was initially used for pasture, but soon settlers found it good for growing wheat, which was carted by horse or bullock wagons to Port Wakefield for further shipment. Dalkey post office opened in 1866 and closed in 1910.

When German farmers settled in the area in the 1860s, their settlement was known as Sichem. A Lutheran school was built in 1868, also used as a place of worship until a separate church building was constructed between 1872 and 1875.

The District Council of Dalkey was established in 1875 with the council chamber being built at Owen in 1882.

The Dalkey Cemetery was registered in 1877.

The Dalkey Lutheran congregation moved to a new church in Balaklava in 1899.

A new school was built at Dalkey in 1905 and closed in 1917 as part of cleansing German from public life during World War I.
