= Lindley, South Australia =

Lindley South Australia
- Coordinates: 33°53′13″S 139°36′47″E
- Population: 0 (SAL 2021)
- Established: 1881
- Postcode(s): 5320
- LGA(s): Mid Murray Council
- Region: Murray and Mallee
- County: Burra
- State electorate(s): Stuart
- Federal division(s): Barker
Mean max temp	Mean min temp	Annual rainfall
25.3 °C; 78 °F	9.3 °C; 49 °F	281.5 mm 11.1 in
Localities around Lindley:
Warnes	Warnes	Bunyung
Maude	Lindley	Stuart
Beatty	Eba	Morgan

Lindley is a locality in Mid Murray Council in the Mid North of South Australia, north of Morgan, South Australia. Its boundaries are coincident with the cadastral Hundred of Lindley in the County of Burra. The Goyder Highway traverses the southwestern corner of the locality.

The locality boundaries were set in March 2003 to conform to the Hundred boundaries. The Hundred was named in 1881 for John Lindley, a botanist and horticulturalist who was assistant librarian for Sir Joseph Banks and Professor of Botany at London University.

Much of the land was selected by settlers in 1881 soon after the Hundred was surveyed for closer settlement. It was bought from the government for a basic price of £1 per acre plus any existing improvements, and the buyers were named in the Government Gazette. Land was able to be bought on credit, and the buyer given time to improve the land before needing to make the payment for their land.
