= Sutherlands, South Australia =

Sutherlands South Australia
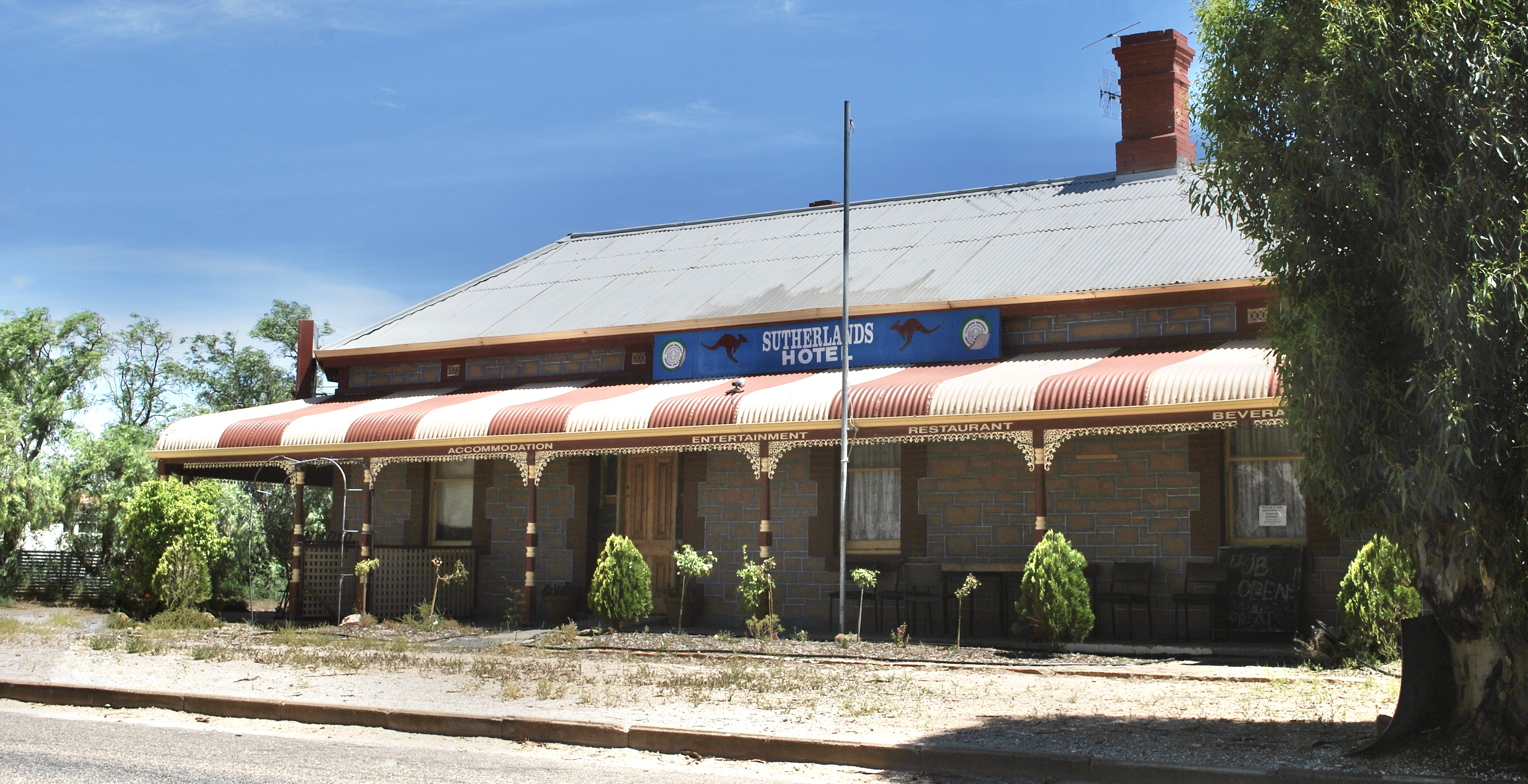
- Sutherlands Hotel

- Coordinates: 34°09′0″S 139°13′0″E
- Population: 33 (SAL 2021)
- Postcode(s): 5374
- Elevation: 234 m (768 ft)
- Location: 115 km (71 mi) NE of Adelaide; 39 km (24 mi) NE of Kapunda; 12 km (7 mi) E of Eudunda
- LGA(s): Regional Council of Goyder
- State electorate(s): Stuart
- Federal division(s): Grey
Localities around Sutherlands:
Australia Plains
Peep Hill, Eudunda	Sutherlands	Bower
Neales Flat		Brownlow

Sutherlands is a rural locality in the Mid North region of South Australia, situated 12 kilometres (7.5 miles) east of Eudunda and 125 kilometres (78 miles) north-east of Adelaide in the Regional Council of Goyder.

Sutherlands railway station was a stop on the Morgan railway line from 1878 until 1969. All track and infrastructure has been removed.

As recorded in the 2021 Australian census, Sutherlands is a small community that had a population of 33 in that year. The gender distribution was equal. The median age of the residents was 52, and there were 12 families living in the area. The census reported a total of 26 private dwellings, with an average of 2.2 people per household. The median weekly household income was $900, and the median monthly mortgage repayments $774. Renters in Sutherlands paid a median weekly rent of $150. The township had an average of 2.5 motor vehicles per dwelling.
