= Narungga =

South Australian Aboriginal group

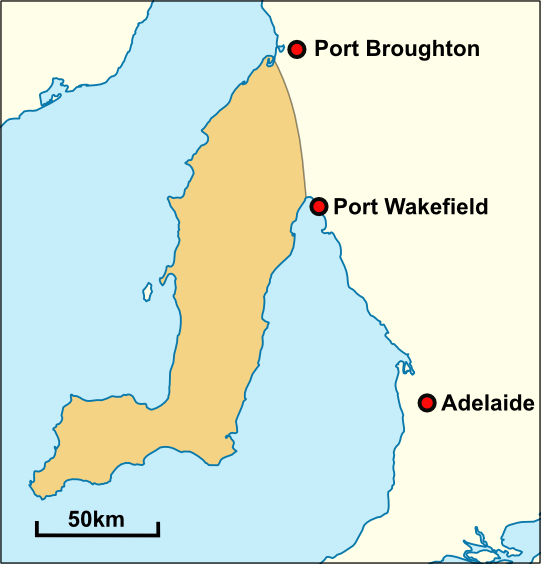
Historical extent of traditional Narungga territory.

The Narungga people, also spelt Narangga, are a group of Aboriginal Australians whose traditional lands are located throughout Yorke Peninsula, South Australia. (Note: "Their country encompasses the whole Peninsula from Port Broughton on the eastern shores of Spencer Gulf to Port Wakefield at the head of Gulf St Vincent, and the surrounding waters and islands." (Krichauff 2008, p. 10)) Their traditional language, one of the Yura-Thura grouping, is Narungga.

== Country ==
In Norman Tindale's estimation the Narungga held some 2,500 square miles (6,500 km^{2}) of tribal land on the Yorke Peninsula, running north as far as Port Broughton. Their eastern limits were around the Hummock Range. The following places all lay within Narungga tribal territory - Bute, Wallaroo, Ardrossan, Marion Bay, and Cape Spencer. Their borders with the Kaurna lay at the head of Gulf St Vincent.

== Language ==
The Narungga people's language is Narungga, which in the 21st century is being revived under various language revival projects.

== Social organisation ==
The Narungga are known to have been composed of at least four groups, according to Norman Tindale, one being Wallaroo.

Later sources say that the Narungga comprised four clans who shared the Yorke Peninsula (which was known as Guuranda to them): Kurnara in the north, Dilpa in the south, Wari in the west and Windarra in the east.

== History of contact ==
The Narungga were a nomadic people who practised fire-stick farming to flush out wildlife and control vegetation. Their diet also included seafood; their expertise at fishing was much admired by early European settlers and a variety of fish species were often traded for tobacco and other goods.

Close to a decade after the British colonisation of South Australia and the establishment of Adelaide in 1836 or earlier, settlers began moving into Yorke Peninsula. However, though native memory states that, before the beginning of occupation (1847), their area was visited occasionally by sealers. At this time, it was estimated that the Narungga numbered approximately 500. Within a decade (1856), a white resident stated that their numbers had been halved. By 1880, the same observer stated that they had been reduced to less than 100. The introduction of scarlet fever and measles in the 1870s also devastated the tribe.

The British concepts of property ownership were incompatible with the Narungga's nomadic lifestyle, resulting in the gradual displacement of the Indigenous population. In 1868, the Point Pearce Aboriginal Mission was established by the Moravian missionary Julius Kühn. After ten years, the mission was largely self-sufficient, though Kühn's early success in securing the confidence of the Narungga by using his medical knowledge suffered a notable blow when 16 residents died of whooping cough and croup over several months in the winter of 1872. Many of the buildings remain today.

Norman Tindale undertook a linguistic and cultural salvage interview with a woman, Louisa Eglinton, whom he deemed to be the sole survivor of the southern Yorke Peninsula people.

== Fishing technique ==
The following is a description of a Narungga technique for catching snapper.

A good-sized fish being roasted, and tied up in a bundle of rushes, is fastened round the neck of a strong swimmer, so that it hangs down his back. With this he swims out to sea a mile or more, and then returns to the sandy beach, the roasted fish still hanging behind him. When near the shore, the swimmer attaches the fish to a spear stuck in the sand, where the water is about three feet deep. In the meantime the men have got ready their long nets, and the shoal of fish, as soon as it arrives on the scent of this drag, is surrounded and taken, Mr. Fowler says that he saw an enormous quantity of schnapper secured in this way on one occasion. It is a mode of fishing I have not heard of before.

== Alternative names and spellings ==
- Adjadura (meaning "my people", ngadja tura)
- Adjahdurah
- Moor-in-nunjie
- Murinandji (eastern and Ngadjuri exonym)
- Naranga (Ngadjuri exonym)
- Narrangga, Narranga, Narrang-gu, Narrang-u
- Narunga
- Nharangka
- Turra
- Wallaroo tribe

== Some words ==
- bindiri yerli /pindira (white man)
- kadli (dingo, wild dog)
- tcha or ŋam:i (mother)
- tchela or bap:i. (father)

== Sources ==
- "Aboriginal South Australia". Government of South Australia. Archived from the original on 1 May 2013.
- "AIATSIS map of Indigenous Australia". AIATSIS. 28 July 2023.
- Hercus, Luise Anna (1992). A Nukunu Dictionary (PDF). AIATSIS. ISBN 978-0-646-10460-7.
- Howitt, Alfred William (1904). The native tribes of south-east Australia (PDF). Macmillan.
- Krichauff, Skye (July 2008). The Narungga and Europeans: cross-cultural relations on Yorke Peninsula in the nineteenth century (PDF). University of Adelaide M.A. thesis.
- Krichauff, Skye (December 2013). "Narungga, the!Townspeople and Julius Kühn: The Establishment and Origins of the Point Pearce Mission, South !Australia" (PDF). Journal of the Anthropological Society of South Australia. 37: 57–71.
- Kühn, Julius (1880). Fison, Lorimer; Howitt, Alfred William (eds.). Kamilaroi and Kurnai (PDF). Melbourne: G Robinson.
- Kühn, Wilhelm; Fowler, W. (1886). "Yorke's Peninsula, South Australia" (PDF). In Curr, Edward Micklethwaite (ed.). The Australian race: its origin, languages, customs, place of landing in Australia and the routes by which it spread itself over the continent. Vol. 2. Melbourne: J. Ferres. pp. 143–147.
- Liebelt, Belinda; Roberts, Amy; O'Loughlin, Clem; Milera, Doug (2016). "'We had to be off by sundown': Narungga contributions to farming industries on Yorke Peninsula (Guuranda), South Australia" (PDF). Aboriginal History. 40: 89–117. doi:10.22459/AH.40.2016.04.
- Taplin, George (1879). Folklore, manners, customs and languages of the South Australian aborigines (PDF). Adelaide: E Spiller, Acting Government Printer.
- Tindale, Norman Barnett (1936). "Notes on the Natives of the Southern Portion of Yorke Peninsula, South Australia". Transactions of the Royal Society of South Australia. 60: 55–70. Alt URL
- Tindale, Norman Barnett (1974). Aboriginal Tribes of Australia: Their Terrain, Environmental Controls, Distribution, Limits, and Proper Names. Australian National University Press. ISBN 978-0-708-10741-6.
