= Narungga language =

Revived Australian Aboriginal language

Narungga
- Narangga
- Native to: Australia
- Region: South Australia
- Ethnicity: Narungga people
- Extinct: c. 1936
- Revival: 1980s 25 speakers (2016 census)
- Language family: Pama–Nyungan: Thura-Yura; Kadli; Narungga
- Writing system: Latin

Language codes
- ISO 639-3: nnr
- Glottolog: naru1238
- AIATSIS: L1
- ELP: Narungga

Narungga (also Narangga) is an Australian Aboriginal language spoken by the Narungga people in Yorke Peninsula, South Australia. As a result of the colonisation of Australia, the Narungga language fell into disuse within several generations. Nevertheless, Narungga continued to be documented into the 20th century, and the 1980s saw a community reclamation. As a result of revival efforts, the language along with Narungga culture is now being taught around the Yorke Peninsula, from Moonta and Maitland Area Schools to Point Pearce.

Narungga is one of the languages in the Yura group, which includes Nukunu, Kaurna, and Ngadjuri, among others, and belongs to the Pama–Nyungan family.

== Phonology ==
=== Consonants ===
		Peripheral		Laminal		Apical	
		Labial	Velar	Dental	Palatal	Alveolar	Retroflex
Plosive		b	ɡ	d̪	ɟ	d	ɖ
Nasal	plain	m	ŋ	n̪	ɲ	n	ɳ
Nasal	pre-stopped			^{d̪}n̪	^{ɟ}ɲ	^{d}n	^{ɖ}ɳ
Tap/Trill						r	ɽ
Lateral	plain			l̪	ʎ	l	ɭ
Lateral	pre-stopped			^{d̪}l̪	^{ɟ}ʎ	^{d}l	^{ɖ}ɭ
Approximant		w			j		ɻ

- The voiced stops /b, ɡ, d̪, ɟ, d, ɖ/ may be heard as voiceless, when geminated as [pː, kː, t̪ː, cː, tː, ʈː].

=== Vowels ===
	Front	Back
Close	i iː	u uː
Open	a aː	
