= Beatty, South Australia =

Beatty
- Town
- Coordinates: 34°01′35″S 139°25′38″E
- Country: Australia
- State: South Australia
- Region: Murray and Mallee
- LGA: Mid Murray Council
- Location: 126 km (78 mi) NE of Adelaide; 99 km (62 mi) N of Mannum
- Established: 27 March 2003

Government
  - State electorate: Chaffey
  - Federal division: Barker

Population
  - Total: 0 (SAL 2021)
- Time zone: UTC+9:30 (ACST)
  - Summer (DST): UTC+10:30 (ACST)
- Postcode: 5320
- County: Eyre
- Mean max temp: 21.1 °C (70.0 °F)
- Mean min temp: 9.3 °C (48.7 °F)
- Annual rainfall: 448.6 mm (17.66 in)
Localities around Beatty
Bundey	Maude	Lindley
Bower	Beatty	Eba
Bower	Bower; Mount Mary	Eba
- Locations; Adjoining localities

Beatty, formerly known as Krichauff (German: [ˈkʁɪçʔaʊf]), is a rural locality in the Australian state of South Australia located in the state's east within the Murray and Mallee region about 126 kilometres (78 mi) north-east of the state capital of Adelaide and about 99 kilometres (62 mi) north of the municipal seat of Mannum.

It was established in March 2003, when boundaries were formalised for the "long established local name". It consists of approximately the northern half of the cadastral Hundred of Beatty.

Beatty is located within the federal division of Barker, the state electoral district of Chaffey and the local government area of the Mid Murray Council.
