= Rocky Plain, South Australia =

Rocky Plain
- Town
- Coordinates: 34.032330°S 139.134980°E
- Country: Australia
- State: South Australia
- LGA: Regional Council of Goyder

Government
  - State electorate: Stuart
  - Federal division: Grey

Population
  - Total: 8 (SAL 2021)
- Postcode: 5381
Localities around Rocky Plain
Robertstown	Bright	Geranium Plains
Robertstown	Rocky Plain	Bower
Australia Plains	Australia Plains	Australia Plains

Rocky Plain is a rural locality in the Mid North region of South Australia, situated in the Regional Council of Goyder. It was established in August 2000, when boundaries were formalised for the "long established local name".

Rocky Plain School opened in 1923, and reached its highest number of students, 23, in 1934. Numbers subsequently declined, and the school closed on 13 March 1943, with the building later demolished.

Rocky Plain has been described as "only a district name", with the "only notable centre to mark the area" being the now-demolished former school.
