= Neales Flat, South Australia =

Neales Flat South Australia
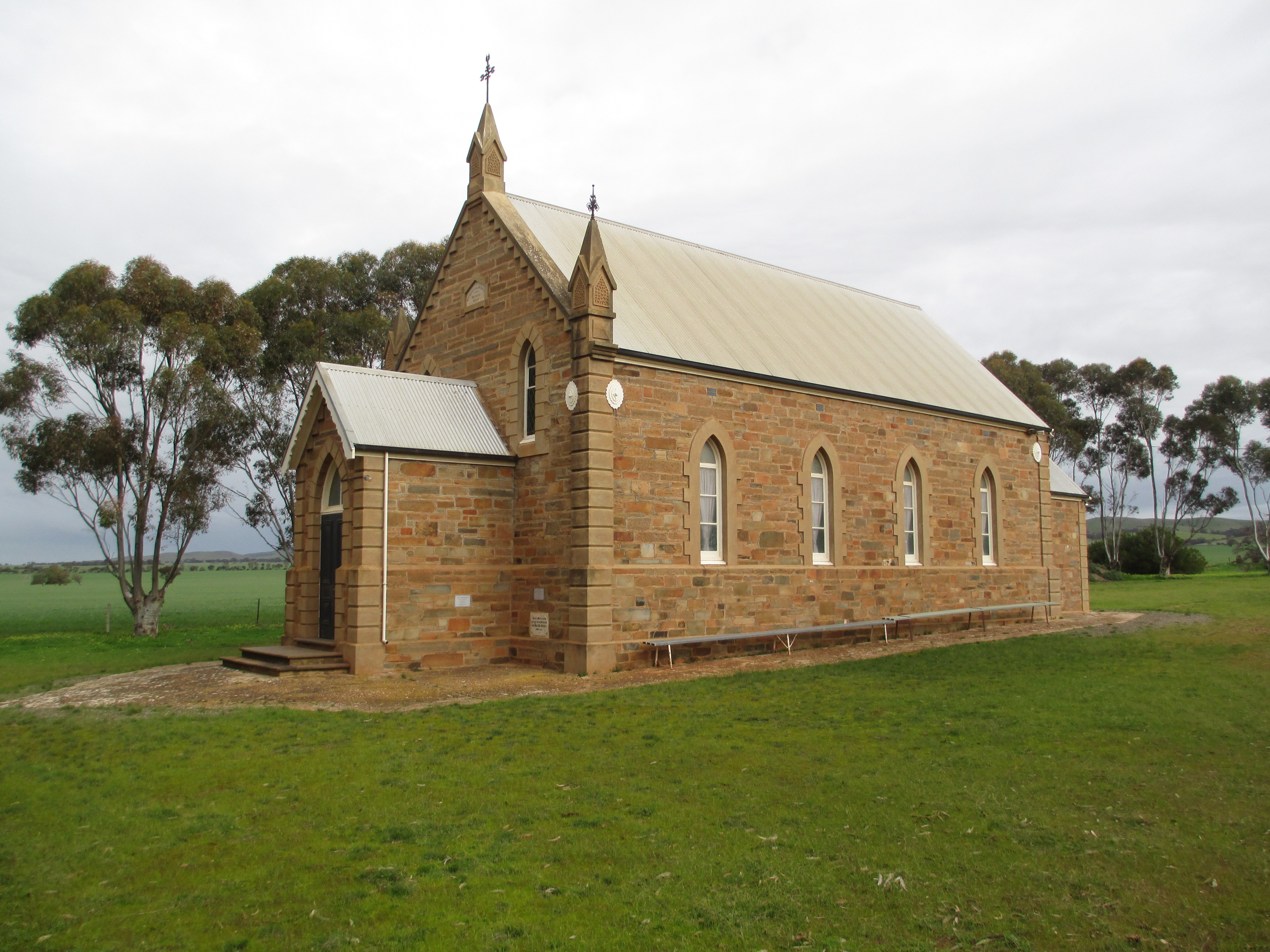
- Neales Flat Lutheran Church, formerly St John's Lutheran Church constructed 1912

- Coordinates: 34.24°S 139.17°E
- Population: 78 (SAL 2021)
- Postcode(s): 5374
- LGA(s): Regional Council of Goyder
- State electorate(s): Stuart
- Federal division(s): Grey
Localities around Neales Flat:
Eudunda		Sutherlands
	Neales Flat	Brownlow
Dutton	Frankton

Neales Flat is a rural locality southeast of Eudunda in the Mid North region in South Australia. It is in the Regional Council of Goyder local government area, the South Australian House of Assembly electoral district of Stuart and the Australian House of Representatives Division of Grey.

== Nomenclature ==
The District of Neales was named in honour of John Bentham Neales, a politician regarded as the "Father of Mining" in South Australia.

== History ==
Neales Flat once had three Lutheran churches. They have combined and only one congregation continues, and combines services with the church at nearby Peep Hill. It is now part of the "Eudunda Robertstown Lutheran Parish", which includes Lutheran churches at Robertstown, Point Pass, Geranium Plains, Eudunda, Neales Flat and Peep Hill.

The first Lutheran people in the district were from the Immannuel Synod and met in homes from 1871, building St Stephan's Lutheran Church in 1874. The congregation of St Paul built its own building a few kilometres further west, also in 1874, followed by a larger building next door (north side) in 1893 with the original building used as a school. The school became a government school in 1917 and closed in 1942. The school building was used by the St John's congregation from 1894 until that congregation built its own building in 1912 immediately south of the school. With union of the Synods in 1967, St John's and St Paul's combined in the St Paul's building as Trinity Lutheran Church. In 2009, St Stephan's merged with Trinity and formed Neales Flat Lutheran Church, meeting in the reconsecrated St John's building. A single cemetery lies behind these two church buildings. A separate cemetery is near St Stephan's church, which has been sold.

== Narcoota ==
Narcoota and associated Narcoota Springs, lie in a valleyin the south of the Eudunda locality near Neales Flat. The area featured prominently in the pioneering history of South Australia.

Located at Section 350, Hundred of Dutton, South Australia, 34°15′43″S 139°07′58″E, Narcoota Springs are at the eastern escarpment of the Mount Lofty Ranges, 12 kilometers south of Eudunda, in a valley on Narcoota Creek, adjacent to the later named Smith Road.

Narcoota, an indigenous name for the area, is of obscure meaning. It may be a corruption of 'Narcoona' – seeing – in reference to being a lookout over the Murray Plains. European settlers adopted it from the outset, although it was variously spelt at first (examples are Nancoota, Tharcoota, and Nicota).

Narcoota Springs was a bustling stopover and watering place for the earliest explorers and pioneering overlanders, being a rare source of permanent water at the brink of the waterless Murray Plains. It was at the western end of the Narcoota Track, which from 1838 to 1842 was part of the main (and first) road between the Murray River and Adelaide. At the eastern end was The Pound, 9 km north of Blanchetown, which years later became named McBean Pound at Roonka Station. The overland road diverged at the Pound – one track went south toward Mount Barker and the other west to Narcoota, then on to Gawler Town and Adelaide.

Apart from overlanding parties droving large mobs of livestock from New South Wales, Narcoota Springs had some distinguished visitors in its heyday. They included Governor George Gawler and explorer Charles Sturt, as well as Henry Inman, Commander of Police, who passed through there at least five times.

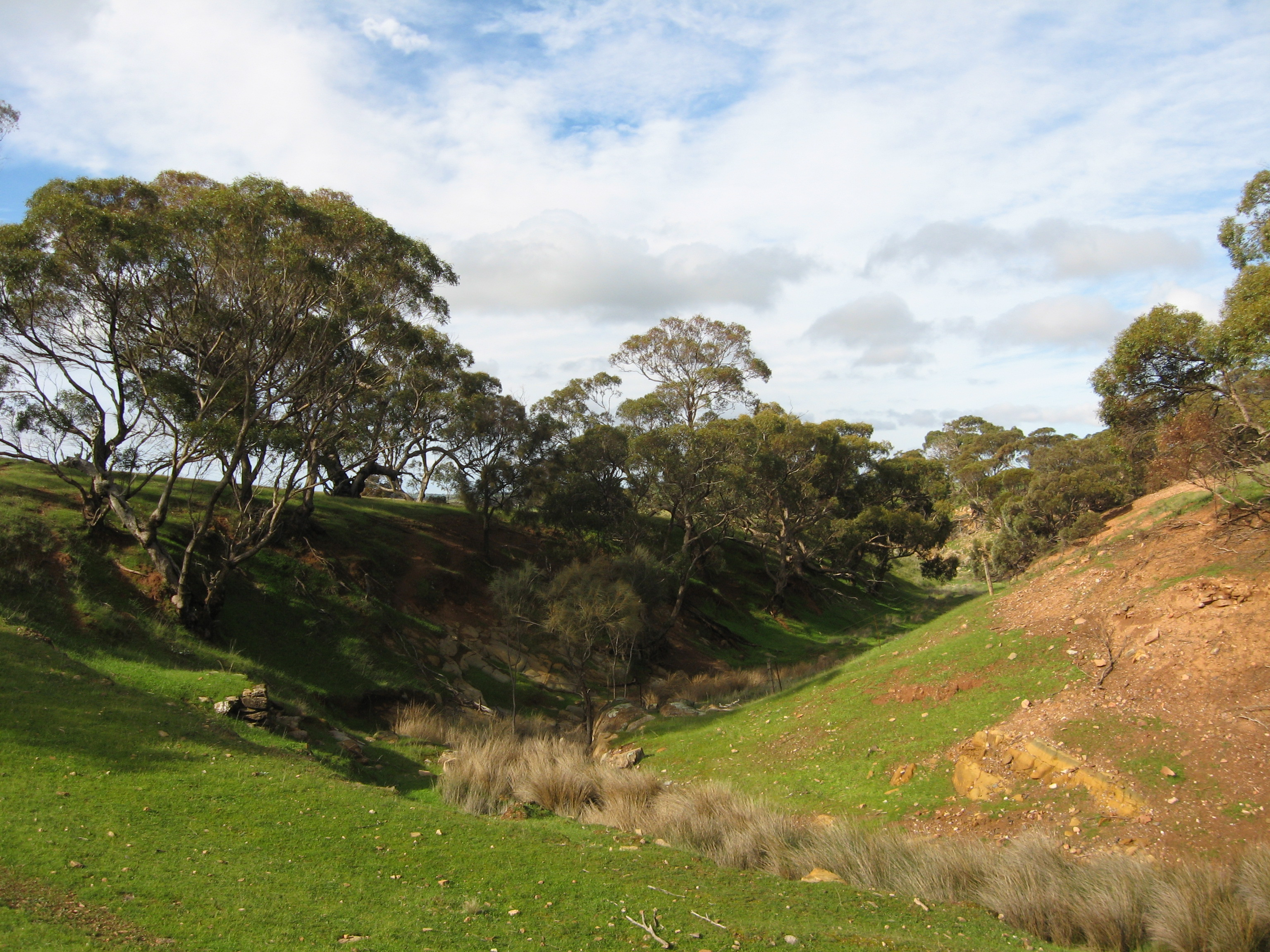
Narcoota Creek, looking east

The first was in 1839 when Inman led a police party to the Weston Flat district to investigate conflict resulting in the death of one over-lander and an unknown number of Aboriginals. Months later he was back again when he took part in the exploration expedition of Governor Gawler from North West Bend to Mount Bryan.

In 1841 Inman was there again after his own over-landing party was attacked near Chowilla, losing 5,000 sheep. He again camped there as part of the 68-man police party led by Commissioner of Police Thomas Shuldham O'Halloran, sent by Governor George Grey to protect other over-landers at the Rufus River.

After a settlement was established in late 1841 by Edward John Eyre at Moorundie (8 km below Blanchetown, South Australia), the overland route then shifted further south, roughly following the present Sturt Highway between Blanchetown and Truro. The Narcoota Track became disused thereafter.

Later in the 1840s a pastoral property named Narcoota Station was established. Nearby is Mount Rufus, where gold was discovered in 1868, but without much result. With closer settlement in the latter part of the 1800s, many grain farmers moved into the district, such that by 1900 there were busy schools and churches. Over a century later many stone ruins attest to the failure of close settlement, but those pioneering foundations produced the farms and grazing properties which thrive there

today.

Geologically, the beds outcropping along Narcoota Creek are so typical in structure and stratigraphy of geological features occurring in several locations throughout the North Mount Lofty Ranges, that the name Narcoota Series has been adopted for the entire group.
