= Eba, South Australia =

Eba
- Town
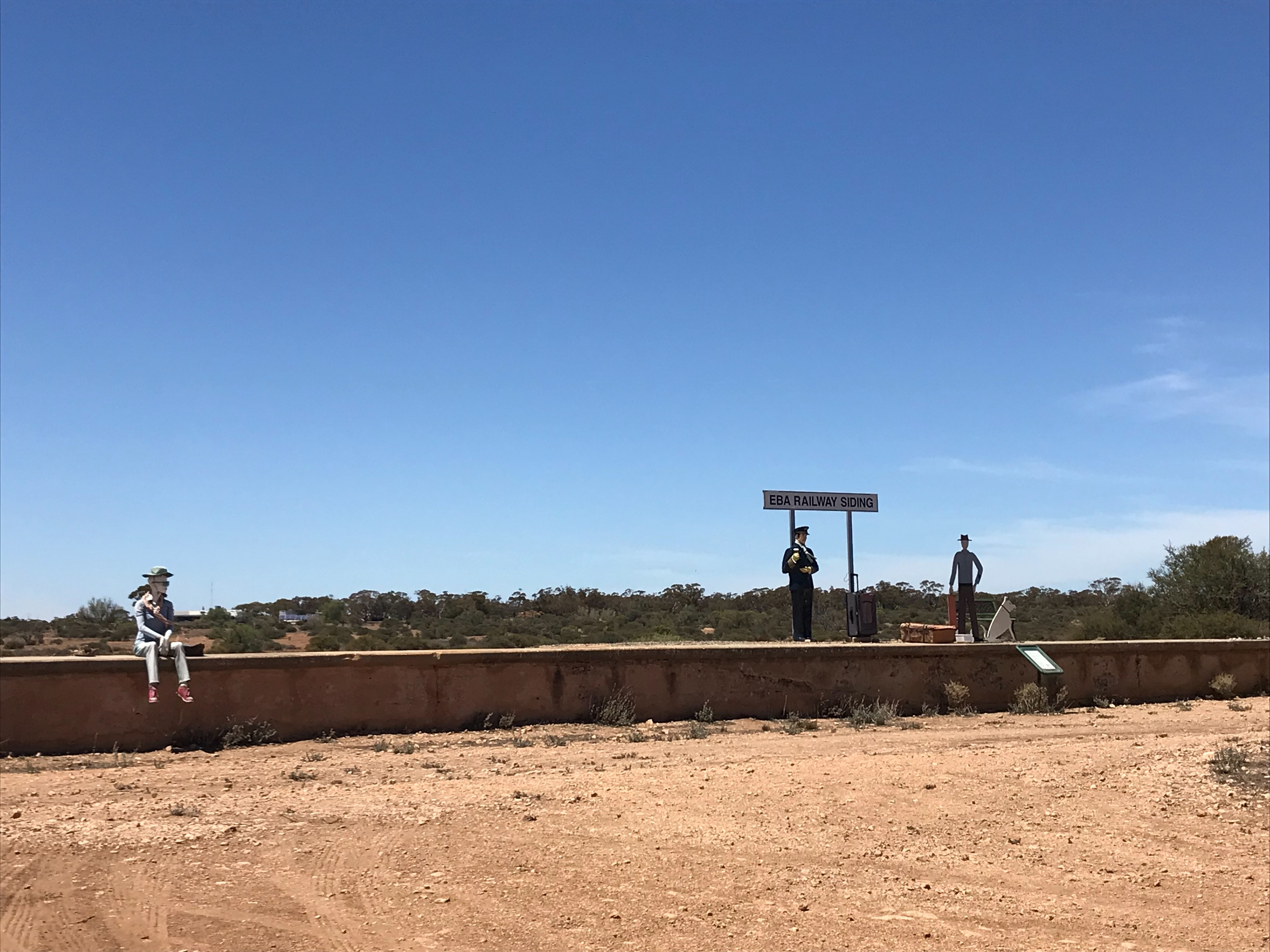
- The platform at the now closed Eba railway station with novelty "passengers", 2018

- Coordinates: 34.06°S 139.58°E
- Country: Australia
- State: South Australia
- LGA: Mid Murray Council
- Location: 10 km (6.2 mi) SW of Morgan
- Established: 27 March 2003

Government
  - State electorate: Chaffey
  - Federal division: Barker
- Elevation: 38 m (125 ft)

Population
  - Total: 27 (SAL 2021)
- Postcode: 5320
Localities around Eba
Maude	Lindley	Lindley
Beatty; Mount Mary	Eba	Morgan
Blanchetown	Blanchetown	Morgan

Eba is a locality in the Murray Mallee region of South Australia, between the Mount Lofty Ranges and the River Murray. It is on the Thiele Highway and was on the former Morgan railway line before the South Australian Railways closed the line in 1969. Morgan is 10 kilometres (6.2 mi) north-east of Eba, a river port where the Murray changes its westward course to a southward one.

== History ==
The locality of Eba occupies the western half of the Hundred of Eba, which was declared in 1860 and named after a friend of the governor of the then colony of South Australia. The current boundaries were created in 2003 for the long-established name. The village once had a post office, school, blacksmith, grocery business and sawmill sending mallee-root firewood to Adelaide and a cricket team, but now little remains of it.

The railway siding was named for the hundred when the railway was built in 1878. It comprised only a passing loop and a goods platform with a shed each for goods and passengers. A mile (1.6 kilometres) towards Morgan was Eba ballast siding, where stone for track ballast was crushed and dispatched along the line.
