= Mimbara Conservation Park =

Protected area in South Australia

- IUCN category VI (protected area with sustainable use of natural resources)
- Location within South Australia
- Location: South Australia, Worlds End
- Nearest city: Burra
- Coordinates: 33°50′32″S 139°07′00″E
- Area: 14.02 km^{2} (5.41 sq mi)
- Established: 26 March 2015
- Governing body: Department for Environment and Water

Mimbara Conservation Park is a protected area in the Australian state of South Australia located in the locality of Worlds End about 147 kilometres (91 mi) north-east of the state capital of Adelaide and about 22 kilometres (14 mi) south-east of the town of Burra.

The conservation park consists of the following land in the cadastral unit of the Hundred of Bright - Allotments 100 and 101 in Deposited Plan 92164 and Section 223. The land first received protected area status as a conservation park proclaimed under the National Parks and Wildlife Act 1972 on 26 March 2015. A separate proclamation made on the same day confirmed the preservation of “certain existing and future rights of entry, prospecting, exploration or mining” in respect to the land. Its name is derived from the clan name used by the Ngadjuri aboriginal people for the land associated with the conservation park. As of 2019, it covered an area of 14.02 square kilometres (5.41 sq mi).

The conservation park is categorised as an IUCN Category VI protected area.

== See also ==
- Protected areas of South Australia
