= Maude, South Australia =

Maude South Australia
- Coordinates: 33°51′17″S 139°25′14″E
- Population: 3 (SAL 2021)
- Postcode(s): 5320
- Location: 25 km (16 mi) northwest of Morgan; 160 km (99 mi) northeast of Adelaide
- LGA(s): Mid Murray Council
- Region: Murray and Mallee
- County: Burra
- State electorate(s): Chaffey
- Federal division(s): Barker
Localities around Maude:
Burra Eastern Districts	Warnes
Bundey	Maude	Lindley
Bower	Beatty	Eba
- Footnotes: Adjoining localities

Maude is a locality on the Goyder Highway in the Mid North region of South Australia.

The locality of Maude occupies the entire Hundred of Maude from which it derives its name. The Hundred of Maude was renamed in 1918 after General Maude as part of the programme of alteration of "names of enemy origin". The Hundred of Maude had previously been the Hundred of Schomburgk, named in 1880 for Dr Richard Von Schomburgk, the second director of the Adelaide Botanic Gardens.

Maude includes the former town of Florieton. Florieton was named in 1882 for Florence Annie Price, the daughter-in-law of the Governor of South Australia, William Jervois. A school opened in 1890, but along with the rest of the town has long disappeared.

Maude is predominantly saltbush grasslands used for pastoral farming, grazing of sheep or cattle. In 2018, a proposal to build a 200MW solar photovoltaic power station was submitted to the state government for development approval.
