= Ngadjuri language =

Extinct Australian Aboriginal language

Ngadjuri
- Native to: Australia
- Region: South Australia
- Ethnicity: Ngadjuri people
- Extinct: by 1975
- Language family: Pama–Nyungan: Thura-Yura; (unclassified); Ngadjuri

Language codes
- ISO 639-3: jui
- Glottolog: ngad1257
- AIATSIS: L5

Ngadjuri is an extinct Australian Aboriginal language formerly spoken by the Ngadjuri people of South Australia, whose traditional lands covered roughly 30,000 square kilometres (11,500 mi^{2}), embracing Angaston and Freeling in the south and running northwards to Clare, Crystal Brook, Gladstone up to Carrieton and Orroroo in the Flinders Ranges.

== Phonology ==
=== Consonants ===
	Peripheral		Laminal		Apical	
	Labial	Velar	Dental	Palatal	Alveolar	Retroflex
Plosive	b	ɡ	d̪	ɟ	d	ɖ
Fricative	(β)					
Nasal	m	ŋ	n̪	ɲ	n	ɳ
Trill					r	
Lateral			l̪	ʎ	l	ɭ
Approximant	w			j		ɻ

- [β] may exist as a possible allophone of /b/, however; it may also be phonemic.
- The voiced stops /b, ɡ, d̪, ɟ, d, ɖ/ may also be heard as voiceless as [p, k, t̪, c, t, ʈ], among speakers.
- The following nasal /n̪, ɲ, n, ɳ/ and lateral sounds /l̪, ʎ, l, ɭ/ may be prestopped as [^{d̪}n̪, ^{ɟ}ɲ, ^{d}n, ^{ɖ}ɳ] and [^{d̪}l̪, ^{ɟ}ʎ, ^{d}l, ^{ɖ}ɭ] when preceded by a stop consonant.

=== Vowels ===
	Front	Back
Close	i iː	u uː
Open	a aː	
