= Thura-Yura languages =

Australian Aboriginal language group

Yura
- Thura-Yura
- Geographic distribution: South Australia
- Linguistic classification: Pama–Nyungan: Arandic–Thura-Yura; Yura
- Subdivisions: Yura proper; Kadli; Wirangu

Language codes
- Glottolog: thur1253
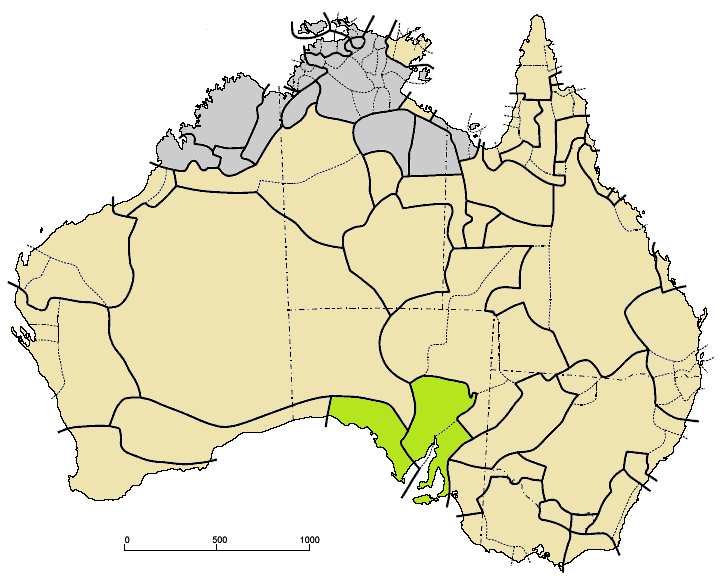
- Thura-Yura languages (green) among other Pama–Nyungan (tan). The two groups are Nangga (west) and Yura–Kadli (east)

The Yura or Thura-Yura languages are a group of Australian Aboriginal languages surrounding Spencer Gulf and Gulf St Vincent in South Australia, that comprise a genetic language family of the Pama–Nyungan family.

== Name ==
The name Yura comes from the word for "person" in the northern languages; this is a lenited form of the thura found in other languages, hence Thura-Yura. Similar words for "person" are found in languages outside the group, however (for example 'yura' - 'person' in the Sydney language).

== Languages ==
The following classification is proposed by Bowern & Koch (2004):

- Thura-Yura
  - Nangga
    - Wirangu
    - Nauo
  - Core Thura-Yura
    - Yura (northern)
      - Adnyamathanha–Kuyani
      - Barngarla
    - Kadli (southern)
      - Narangga
      - Kaurna
    - (unclassified)
      - Nukunu
      - Ngadjuri

A Nukunu speaker reported that the Nukunu could understand Barngarla and Kuyani, but not more distant varieties.

Peramangk may have been a southern Thura-Yura language, close to Kaurna.

Dixon (2002) lists a Nantuwara language, but there is no data for it.

== Proto-language ==
Proto-Thura-Yura
- Reconstruction of: Thura-Yura languages
- Reconstructed ancestor: Proto-Pama–Nyungan

Reconstructed Thura-Yura vocabulary by Simpson and Hercus (2004):

Spelling conventions

- alveolar tap: r
- alveolar trill: rr
- retroflex glide: ṟ
- retroflex tap: rd
- indeterminate rhotic: R

gloss	Proto-Thura-Yura	Proto-Core Thura-Yura	Northern Thura-Yura	Southern Thura-Yura
all			wapu; kurru	
all, many, big	*marna			
ashes		*muru	thimpa	
ashes (charcoal)			piirla	
bad		*wadLV		
bad (without)		*wakV-Na		
bark		?*yulti		
beard			ngaNka	yaNka
beard, cheek, hair	*maLTa			
belly			warna	munthu
belly (abdomen)		?*TiDLi		
big			ngarla	
bird			THirta	
black			maṟu	
blood		?*kaaṟu; *karti		
body: muscle, sinew	*THiltya	*thiltya		
bone	*waLpu	*waLpu	warlpu	
breast		*ngamV		
camp (house)		*warDli		
camp (house, ?from “join”)	*karrpa	*karrpa		
camp (hut)			karnku	
chest		*kuntu		
child, baby				wa(L)kuwa(L)ku
child, small	*kitya		yakaCV; waNi	
child, voice of infant		*kunga		
cloud		*ma(L)ku		
cloud (low, fog)		*putyi		
cold (cough)		*kuLTV-		
cold, frost		*pakaDla		
cold (in head)			(y)urrkV-	
cold (weather)	*paya-; *mVnyV	*manya	payala (Probably derived from “to bite”)	
come here!	*paNi; *ka	*kawayi		
dog	*wiLka		wiLka (domestic dog)	kadli (domestic dog)
down, below		?*warta-	wartathi	
dry		*muDLa	murdla	
dry, dust		*puthV-RV		
ear	*yuṟi			
earth		*yarta		
egg			pipi	muka
elbow		*thiDNngi	K/NGuNaN-	
eye	*mii-na			
eyebrow		*piiku		
far (stranger)			yampa	
fat	*mVrnV	*marni		
feather		?*paDLu		
fingernail	*pirri			
fire	*karDla			
fish	*kuya			
fly		*thapu		
fly (big fly)	*thumpV-Ca	*thupV(-Ra)		
food	*mayi			
foot	*THiDna	*thidna		
good		*wayV-		
hair, feather		*puthi		
hand	*maṟa			
head	*kaka			
heart			thurlku	
hungry			karnpa	
knee	?*puṟV	*mampa	puṟa	
knee (kneecap)		*maTa		
leaf			karlpi	
liver		*Tangka	thangka; ngaLTi	
louse	*kuDLu	*kuDlu		
man (boy after circumcision)			pardnaapa	
man (companion)		*Nipu		
man (grown-up)		*miṟu (grownup man)		
man (husband)			marni	
man (initiand)	?*wilya-ṟu	?*ngulta		
man (male, husband)		*yarDli		
man (person)		?*Tuṟa	*thuṟa	
meat	*paRu			
meat, flesh, heart	*puLTHA	*puLTHa	*pultha	
moon	*piṟa			
mouth	*Taa			
mouth, lip			Nimi	
name		*mityi		
nape, neck			ngurnti, nhurnti; wakarra	
neck		*waLTu		
night		*nguLTi	maLTi	
night, yesterday	*wiltya			
north wind, hot weather	*pukarra			
north-east wind			ngarnara	karnaRa
nose	*muDlha	*mudlha		
not, do not		*madLa	mardla; kuta	
now	*kaRi			
now, again		?*nhaTa		
now, morning	?*panyi			
now, soon			yatha	
old man	*puLka			
one	*kuma			
other, another, the rest	*kutyu			
penis		*waRi		
pigface, plant food type (?Carpobrotus rossii sp.)	?*kaCkaLa	*karrkaLa		
red	?*TVLTV-	*TaLTHa-	thaltha-	
red ochre		*miLTi; *karrku		
rib		*TiNinyV		
rib, side, flank	*pantyi			
road	?*Tapa	*Tapa	thapa	
root				
rotten, bad-smelling	?*puka	*thungkV		
shit, faeces	*kuDna	*kudna		
shoulder			piLpi-	
shoulder, wing		*wiṟi		
sick, ill	?*ngaNDa-N			
sick, wound	*mingka			
skin		?*paLpa	piyi	paLpa
skin, clothes	*palhtha			
sky		*NayirrV	iLkaRV	
sky, cloud and dust		?*wirra		
smoke	*puyu			
smoke (stuff for producing smoke)		?*Tumpu		
snake	?*TuDNu		wapma	
snake, carpet snake			muDLV-	
south and south wind		*parrpa		
southerly wind		*walypi		waitpi
spear (large)	*wiNTa		wirnta	
spear (small)	*kVya	*kaya		
spit	*THaDlhi	*THadlhi	ngapalya; ngalytya	
star		*purDli		
stone, adze			THurdla	
stone, cooking stone		?*kaDnya		
stone, hill, grinding stone, kneecap		*puRi		
stone, limestone	*parnta			
stone, quartz-like stone, ice		*makV		
sun	*THirntu	*thirntu		
tail			kaDLHa	
testicles	*kaDLu	*kadLu	kardlu	
that (near)	*pa-	*pa-	pa-nha	
that (remote)		*ngu-	ngunha	
thigh	*kaNTHi	*kaNTHi	kanthi	
thigh, flank, groin	?*paLTi			
this (nearest)	*iNHa			
throat		*yurDni		
to bite		*paya-		
to burn tr.	*kampa-			
to burn intr.		*ngaDLi-		
to climb	?*warnta-			
to come		?*puDNa-		
to cry, call		*kaLTa-		
to cry, tears			*muLka	
to cry, to scream			*ngaTV-	
to cut		?*waNi-		
to die	*paDLu-		thinta-; padlu-	
to die, dead		*kuDnyu	kupa	
to dig		*paNi-; ?*paka-	pani-	
to drink, to kiss, to manipulate with mouth	*THapa-	*Tapa-	thapa-	
to eat	*ngaLku-			
to enter		*ngaLpa-		
to fall	*warDni-			
to get		*manku-		
to get, pick up, lead, bring	*kaNka-	*kangka-		
to get, take away		*mama-		
to give	*yungkV-		nhungku-	
to go	?*wiNV-		nguka-	
to go, walk		?*padNV-		
to hear		*yuri- See “ear”.		
to hit with hand	*paLTa-			
to hit with missile	*nguṟV-		nguṟa-	
to hit, cause break in material integrity		*pungku-		
to hit, kill	*kuNTa-		kurnta-	
to know, see	*THiLka-	*thiLka-		
to leave it	*wVNTV-	*waNTa-	wanthV-	
to lie down		*waNTi-	wanti-	
to put, to get used to			ila-	
to see	*nhaku-			
to sit		*Tika-	thika-	
to sleep, asleep	*miya			
to speak	*wangka-			
to spear			wiTi-	
to stand		*yuwa-		
to throw		*paTV-	patha-	
to tie, support, build	?*karrpV-		karrpV-	
tomorrow		?*TarrkV-		
tongue	*THa(a)LiN		tha(a)rli	tha(d)lVnya
tooth			yira	Tiya
tree		*wadLa; *wira	wardla	
two		*puLa	puDla; kalypilV	purla
up, above	?*kaNka		kanka	
up, above, high		*karra		
urine, piss	*kumpu			
warm (weather)		*warlta		
water	*kawi; *kapi			
west	*wangka			
what (how many)		*-miNV	[-]minha	
what?		*Na-, ?*Nawi		
when?		*nhaDLa-TV		
where?	?*wa-THa	*wa-(nha)		
white	*paLkV	*paLka	paLka-ra	
who? (Ergative, Instrumental)		*ngaNTu		
who? (Nominative)	*ngaNa	*ngaNa		
who? (Possessive)		*ngaNku		
wind	*wari			
woman		*pa(a)rla		ngangki
woman, girl		*mankarra		
woman, mother, female		*ngamV-THV		
woman, wife		*kartu		
yam, edible root, plant food type		*ngampa		
yesterday		*puki		
young one			papa	
