= Robertstown, South Australia =

Robertstown
- Town
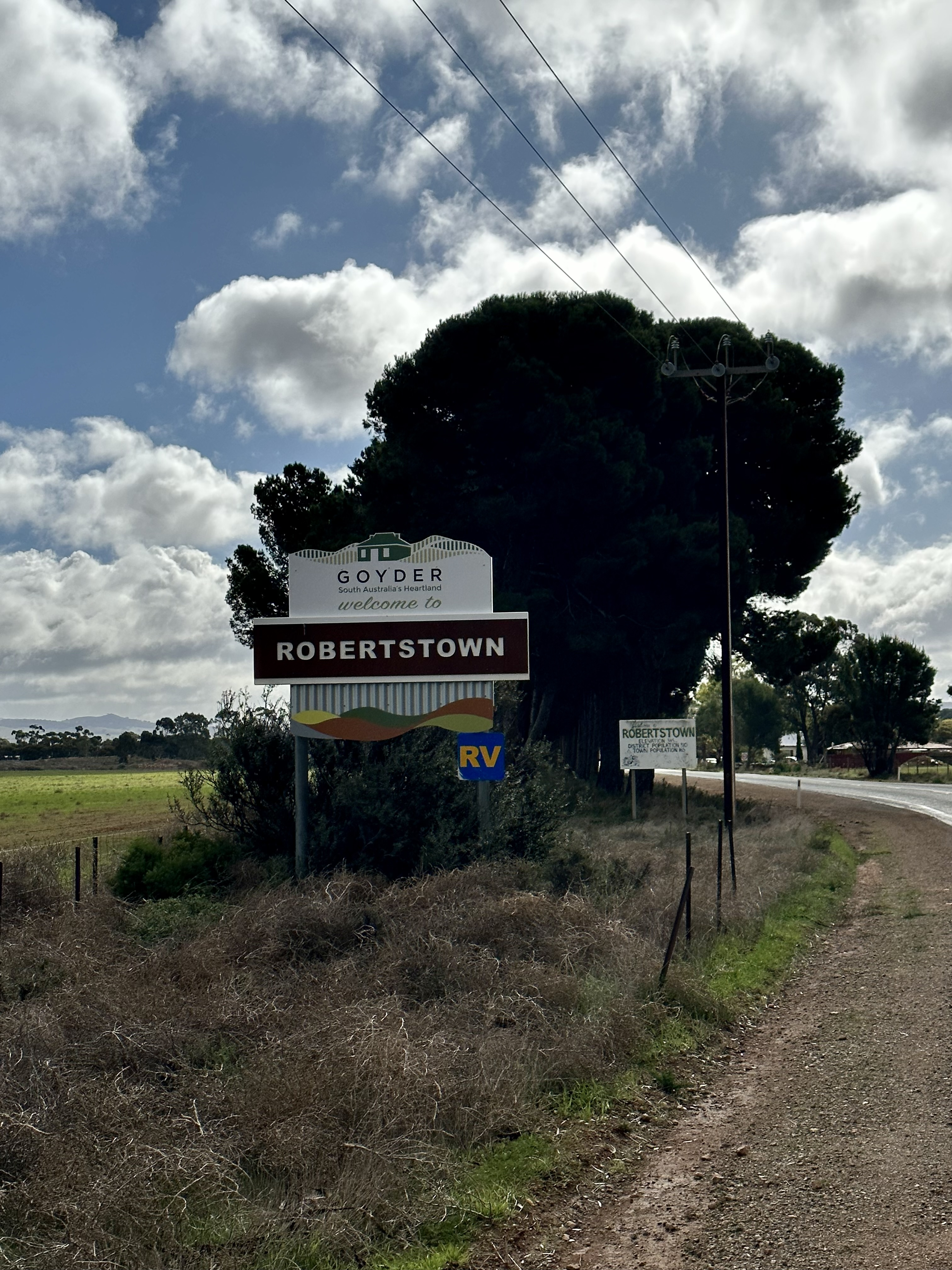

- Coordinates: 34°00′0″S 139°04′0″E
- Country: Australia
- State: South Australia
- LGA: Regional Council of Goyder
- Location: 125 km (78 mi) N of Adelaide; 23 km (14 mi) N of Eudunda; 45 km (28 mi) S of Burra

Government
  - State electorate: Stuart
  - Federal division: Grey
- Elevation: 344 m (1,129 ft)

Population
  - Total: 223 (SAL 2021)
- Postcode: 5381
Localities around Robertstown
| Emu Downs | Hallelujah Hills | Bright |
| Brady Creek | Robertstown | Rocky Plain |
| Ngapala | Point Pass | Australia Plains |

Robertstown is a town in the Mid North region of South Australia, situated 125 km north of Adelaide, in the Regional Council of Goyder. At the 2021 census, Robertstown had a population of 223 people.

== Etymology ==
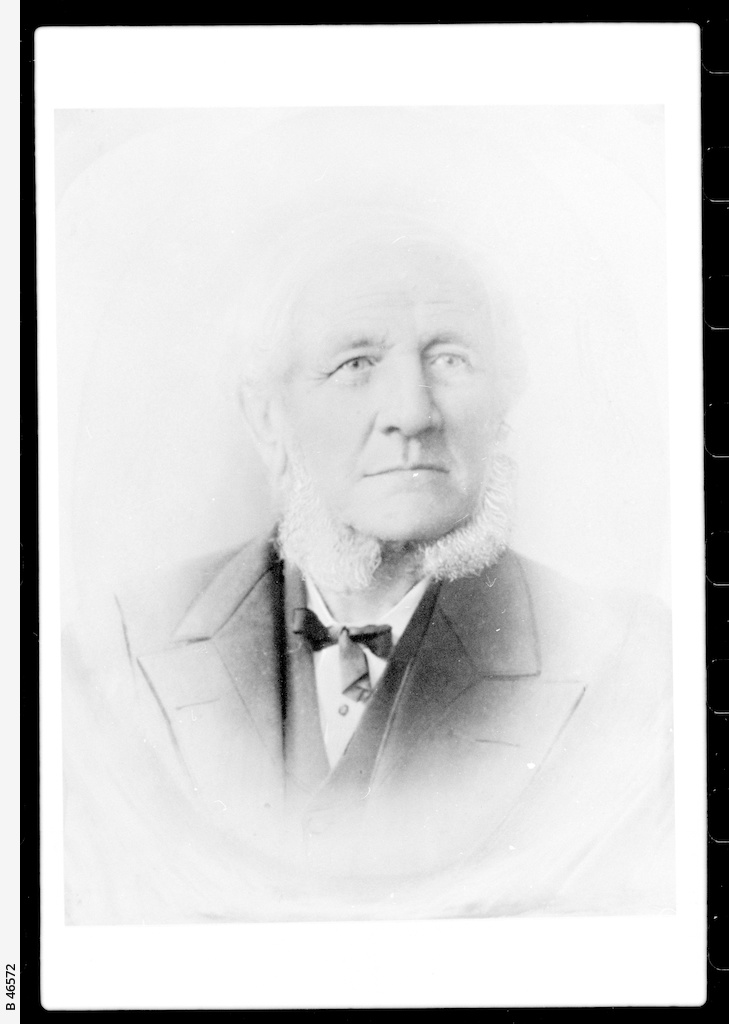
Mr John Roberts, the township‘s namesake, pictured c.1880.

Robertstown derives its name from John Roberts, the first postmaster in the region, who established the town layout in 1871. Previously, it was referred to as Emu Flats.

== History ==
The Robertstown area is the traditional lands of the Ngadjuri people. Despite their significant historical presence, the Ngadjuri people have been frequently omitted from historical accounts of colonisation and the process by which they were dispossessed of their traditional lands.

In the early days of colonisation, the land in the district was primarily leased to stations like Anlaby and Koonoona. The first settlers were likely stock overlanders from New South Wales. From 1850 onwards, the area was surveyed into smaller blocks, attracting European settlers to the region.

As the settlement grew, a wine shanty operated by Mr. O'Dea became the first shop in the area. John Roberts, a Koonunga storekeeper, later catered to the community with his traveling shop and eventually settled in the town, opening a general store and post office. In 1912, Roberts' son constructed a new general store, which was renamed Lehmann's Store after being acquired by a long-serving employee.

The SA Asbestos & Mining Co. Ltd began operations in 1894, establishing a mine 13 kilometres northeast of the town. Later, from 1940 to 1951, the Blue Hole Mine operated as an open-cut quarry, located 5 kilometres northwest of Robertstown.

The town became more accessible when it was designated as the terminus of the Robertstown railway line from Eudunda and Adelaide. This railway service commenced in 1914, connecting Robertstown to the broader South Australian rail network. The Robertstown railway line continued to service the community until its closure in 1990, marking the end of nearly eight decades of rail transport to the town.

The population of Robertstown increased steadily in the early 20th century. By 1936, the town reached its peak population of approximately 2,100 residents, after which numbers began to decline. After operating continuously for 112 years, including 75 years under the same proprietor, Lehmann's Store finally closed its doors in August 2024, representing the end of an era for the Robertstown community.

== Demographics ==
According to the 2021 Census, Robertstown has a population of 223 people, with males accounting for 49.8% and females making up the remaining 50.2%. The median age of residents in Robertstown is 59. Approximately 1.3% of the population identifies as Aboriginal and/or Torres Strait Islander.

Robertstown has 58 families and 143 private dwellings, with an average of 1.9 people per household. The town has a substantial Lutheran community, with 27.4% of its residents practicing this religion, a figure considerably higher than the state average of 2.4%. This strong affiliation with Lutheranism can be attributed to the area's notable Lutheran heritage. The top three countries of birth for residents are Australia, England, and New Zealand.

The top three occupations in the town are managers, machinery operators and drivers, and labourers. The dominant industries in Robertstown include grain-sheep or grain-beef cattle farming, road freight transport, bakery product manufacturing, and supermarket and grocery stores. The median weekly household income in Robertstown is $748, lower than the state average.

Median monthly mortgage repayments in Robertstown are $433, lower than the state average. The median weekly rent in the town is $193, also lower than the state average. Robertstown has an average of 2.3 motor vehicles per dwelling, highlighting the importance of private transportation in the area.

== Education ==
Robertstown has a public primary school, which as of 2022 had 9 enrolled students.

== Sports and recreation ==
Robertstown's sporting facilities include an oval; basketball, netball, and tennis courts; and a bowling green. Robertstown has several sports clubs catering to various interests including:

- Eudunda & Robertstown Cricket Club - Barossa & Light Cricket Association
- Eudunda Robertstown Football Club - North Eastern Football League
- Eudunda Robertstown Netball Club - North Eastern Netball Association
- Robertstown Basketball Club
- Robertstown Bowling Club
- Robertstown Tennis Club - Julia & Light Tennis Association

Robertstown has a history of hosting motorcycle events, including the South Australian Reliability Trials Championship (SART). One of the rounds is held in Robertstown and is known as the Lew Job 2 Day event, organised by the Velocette Motorcycle Club.

Robertstown also has two children's playgrounds.

== Nature and trails ==
- The Lavender Federation Trail is a long-distance hiking trail that includes the 7.5 km spur trail to Robertstown.
- The Heysen Trail is a long-distance hiking trail that passes approximately 10 km west of Robertstown, with a walk-in campsite called Webbs Gap nearby.
- The World's End Driving Trail is a car trail that passes through Robertstown from Eudunda to Burra, showcasing rural landscapes of hills, valleys, gorges, and lagoons.

Robertstown Oval hosts a free campground with a public dump point.
