= Ngadjuri =

Aboriginal Australian people

The Ngadjuri people are a group of Aboriginal Australian people whose traditional lands lie in the mid north of South Australia with a territory extending from Gawler in the south to Orroroo in the Flinders Ranges in the north.

== Name ==
Their ethnonym is derived from two words: ŋadlu, meaning "we" and juri signifying "man", hence "we men".

== Language ==
Wilhelm Schmidt proposed that, together with the languages of the Kaurna, Narungga and Nukunu, the Ngadjuri language formed one of the elements of a subgroup he called the Miṟu languages. It is now classified as a member of the Thura-Yura language family.

Elements of the vocabulary were recorded by Samuel Le Brun, step-son of one of the Canowie Station proprietors, R. Boucher James. Le Brun, who spent parts of his youth at Canowie in the late 1850s, took an interest in the Aboriginal vocabulary of the district, and in 1886 was among the laymen who made submissions on this topic to a book by Edward Micklethwaite Curr (1820-1889). Le Brun's vocabulary has in recent times been attributed to the Nukunu near Spencer Gulf, but he himself states it originated from "forty miles east of Port Pirie", which places it near Canowie, with which he was intimately familiar, and is therefore the vocabulary of the Ngadjuri people. Their word for water, cowie or kowi, appears quite frequently as a suffix within Ngadjuri-based nomenclature of the region, such as Yarcowie, Canowie, Caltowie, Warcowie, and Booborowie.

== Country ==
The Ngadjuri homelands covered roughly 11,500 square miles (30,000 km^{2}), embracing Angaston and Freeling in the south and running northwards to Clare, Crystal Brook, Gladstone up to Carrieton and Orroroo in the Flinders Ranges. (Note: "The territory of the Ngadjuri people extended from Angaston and Gawler in the south to Pirie and Orroroo in the north. Westward they ranged to Crystal Brook, but they scarcely touched the coast of Spencer Gulf except when on visits to the Naraŋga people of Yorke Peninsula. In the south their boundaries marched with those of the Kaurna between Hamley Bridge and Gawler. Their easrtern boundary was the eastern scarp of the Mount Lofty Ranges." (Tindale 1937, p. 149)) Their territory coincides quite precisely with the range of the peppermint gum, which explains why the Kaurna people's exonym for them was Wirameju, meaning in Kaurna "peppermint gum forest people".

To the northeast, they took in the area Waukaringa and Koonamore. The districts of Peterborough, Burra and Robertstown are in Ngadjuri territory. The eastern boundaries coincide with the area of Mannahill.

== Alternative names ==
- Abercrombie (likewise a Ngadjuri horde name)
- Aluri, Alury
- Boanawari ('bat people', used of eastern tribes who did not engage in circumcision rights, and feared the Ngadjuri's proselytization for the practice)
- Burra Burra (a name for one of the Ngadjuri hordes)
- Doora
- Eeleeree
- Eura (this is generic for several tribes in which the Ngadjuri were included)
- Hilleri, Hillary
- Manu, Monnoo, Manuley
- Manuri (a Nukunu exonym putatively meaning 'inland people')
- Manuri ('big goanna people', an exonym employed for them by the Nganguruku)
- Mimbara (the name for the northernmost horde of the Ngadjuri)
- Ngadluri, Ngaluri
- Wirameju (wira signifies gum tree, meju, men, thus yielding 'gum forest men')
- Wirra, Weera
- Wirrameyu, Wirramayo, Wirramaya, Wiramaya
- Yilrea
- Youngye (a language name)

Source: Tindale 1974

== Social organisation ==
Before European settlers reached the area, after British colonisation of South Australia, the Ngadjuri, who practised circumcision, were aggressively moving eastwards towards the Murray River, insisting that tribes there adopt the practice. According to anthropologist Norman Tindale, the Ngadjuri were composed of several "hordes", some of whose names are known:

- Burra Burra
- Abercrombie (a name conferred on one Ngadjuri horde)
- Mimbara (the horde on the northernmost reaches of Ngadjuri territory)

== History of contact ==
The Ngadjuri are virtually invisible in the histories of colonisation of, and their dispossession from, the traditional tribal lands. As with other Aboriginal groups in South Australia, the Ngadjuri led nomadic lives and were decimated by introduced European diseases, such as measles and smallpox, as colonisers took over their water and land resources, leading to their dispersion. A unit of police were established at Bungaree Station as early as 1842. The discovery and development of large copper mines at Kapunda and then Burra in 1844 and 1845 respectively spurred a notable influx of settlers into their region. Calculating from records on the supply of foodstuffs to the native population, in 1852 it is estimated that there were some 70 Ngadjuri people drawing rations, and the children readily joined in the introduced games by playing marbles, rounders and cricket, but the spread of agriculture appears to have coincided with the disappearance of the central community within the following 20 years.

The Mimbara group however held out in the northern bushlands until 1905, as the last "wild" group of Aboriginal peoples of South Australia. These were relocated south to the outskirts of Quorn, and at Riverton, and on Willochra Creek.

== Art ==
The Ngadjuri used petroglyphs, body art, and other art forms to express their culture and beliefs. and examples of the first can be found at Firewood Creek, just a little to the northeast of Burra (in Ngadjuri, this place is known as Kooringa). Parallel striations (lines) are a very familiar theme, but other familiar features of Indigenous Australian art, such as hand prints, and kangaroo and emu footprints were also used.

== Culture ==
The Ngadjuri practised formalised burial practices with bodies sometimes smoked or dried before burial and many buried skeletons were uncovered during the construction of the Spalding railway line. Large groups of up to a hundred men would hold mass possum hunts through the timbered hills. Although ceremonies were usually male-only private events, by the 1860s they had begun to commercialise them with the increasingly dominant European culture spectators; through whom they solicited donations.

== Mythology ==
One myth recorded from Ngadjuri informants appears to reflect historic circumstances related to a precolonial thrust by starving Barngarla and Kokata peoples from the Western Desert regions around Lake Eyre down towards the Eyre Peninsula, which put peoples like the Ngadjuri on the defensive. The story runs as follows:

A woman accompanied by two dogs, one red, the other black, both with a human appearance, came down from the northwest and passing through the Flinders Ranges site of Buðajerta ('snow country'), namely Mount Patawerta, they began to kill and eat any human they met. Word spread quickly of the imminent threat and people fled from their path. As the cannibal woman drew near to the game-rich and well-watered camping grounds at Karuna, the Ganjamata hill people decided to make a stand and try to kill the intruders. To this end they chose two warriors, Kudnu, the jew lizard, and Wulkinara his brother, to face the trio. Armed with boomerangs, they set a trap near the woman and her dogs, with Wulkinara suggesting to Kudnu that he take up position in a tree, and, on sighting the woman and her hounds, make some noise to draw their attention his way, while he, Wulkinara would lay in ambush in scrub nearby. At first the dogs failed to hear the noise, but, on his brother's insistent whisper that he yell out more audibly, Kudnu managed to inveigle the red dog to leap up into the tree, and, just as he did, Wulkinara swung the boomerang in his right hand and, flying truly, it sliced that dog in two. Kudnu then shouted again, and the black dog charged his hide-out, which Wulkinara also managed also to cut it in half, throwing the other boomerang in his left hand. They then killed the cannibalistic woman and burnt her. The blood spilled by the slaughtered dogs left two deposits: that of the red dog became the invaluable red ochre deposit at Parachilna Gorge, harvested by the Ngadjuri also for its medicinal properties. The black dog's blood formed a wad of the same colour, which was used both in smearing the bodies of youths during their initiation and in dancing performances.

A further element in the tale suggested to Tindale that the story might be inflected with an historically verifiable dating. Following the killings, something odd occurred, with the sun, which, up to that time, had never been known to set:

The sun set in the west after the cannibal woman and her hunting dogs had been eliminated, and extraordinary happening that made the frightened tribespeople burst out wailinhg. Every endeavor to get nit to rise up failed. Kudnu however, during these attempts, stayed soundly asleep, but once his frustrated kinsmen also fell asleep in sheer exhaustion, he rose and hurled a boomerang northwards where it circled and then returned to earth. This had no effect, so he tried again and again, successively aiming single throws, west, then south, to no avail. Persisting he threw his fourth boomerang eastwards. He pricked his nears attentively, listening to the sound made by the whirling wood, and gazing, saw it circling back from that direction, and as it drew back near to him, the sky began to shed light, and the day broke. He roused his tribesfolk, who joyously gave him many gifts out of gratitude. In Ngadjuri lore, those gifts, rugs, spears and clubs, remain marked emblematically on the jew lizard's back.

Tindale thought that this may reflect, or have been inflected by, the last solar eclipse that took place over the Parachilna Gorge area on 13 March 1793.

The Ngadjuri also had a version of the widespread Eagle and Crow myth, which Tindale recorded from both the Ngadjuri and the Maraura, and which was also studied by R. M. Berndt and his wife C.H. Berndt. Tindale's version runs as follows:

Crow, while joining Eagle in hunting was jealous of the latter for refusing to share the game it caught, and because it was powerful enough to smash the nests of the jerboa rat. To punish Eagle, sharpened a piece of bone (paija) obtained from a kangaroo's leg, and, sticking it sharp-end upwards inside a jerboa nest told it to move about when Crow spoke to it, in order to conjure up the impression that many rats lived inside. He then enticed Eagle to the nest, and asked him flatteringly to smash it so they might eat the contents, and the paija bone, at these words, made noises that confirmed the idea many rats were hidden inside. Eagle stamped on the nest, and the bone pierced his foot, leaving him with a painful limp. Crow 'crowed' with delight as Eagle struggled to make his way back to their camp. Eagle then set about tracking Crow and his family as they moved northeast to Titalpa and then west to Waruni where his festering wound burst and pus streamed out, forming the reef of white quartz still visible today. As it was raining, he reached the cave where Crow and his family had taken shelterd and denied him access because his foot was said to smell, made a fire of porcupine grass at the mouth of the cave, and, hearing the family inside choking, marched off triumphantly, certain they would be suffocated to death. Turning into a bird, he swooped back down three times to the cave to feast on the blackfellow Crows, only to find his father always there, who blocked him, and kept throwing him some meat instead. From that day onwards, the eagle swoops to earth for its prey, while the crow, descended from the smoked-out family, is black even to the point of bearing smokey eyes.

== Native title ==
When Anglo-European settlers first arrived in 1836 at Holdfast Bay (now Glenelg), the land was considered in the South Australia Act 1834 passed by the British Parliament and by Governor Hindmarsh as commander-in-chief in his Proclamation of 1836, to be a barren wasteland. In contrast to the rest of Australia, terra nullius did not apply to the new province. The Letters Patent establishing the Province of South Australia attached to the Act acknowledged prior Aboriginal ownership, and stated that no actions could be undertaken that would "affect the rights of any Aboriginal natives of the said province to the actual occupation and enjoyment in their own persons or in the persons of their descendants of any land therein now actually occupied or enjoyed by such natives".

Nonetheless, under the Act, the indigenous inhabitants were assumed to have become British subjects. Although the patent guaranteed land rights under force of law for the indigenous inhabitants, it was ignored by the South Australian Company authorities and squatters.

== Notable people ==
- Vince Copley AM (1936–2022), activist, elder, and leader
- Gladys Elphick MBE (1904–1988), founding president of the Council of Aboriginal Women of South Australia

== See also ==
- History of Adelaide
- Mimbara Conservation Park

== Sources ==
- Amery, Rob (2016). Warraparna Kaurna!: Reclaiming an Australian language. University of Adelaide Press. ISBN 978-1-925-26125-7.
- Austin, Peter; Hercus, Luise (2004). "The Yarli Languages". In Bowern, Claire; Koch, Harold (eds.). Australian Languages: Classification and the comparative method. John Benjamins Publishing Company. pp. 207–222. ISBN 978-9-027-29511-8.
- Berndt, Ronald Murray; Berndt, Catherine Helen; Stanton, John E. (1993). A World that was: The Yaraldi of the Murray River and the Lakes, South Australia. University of British Columbia UBC Press. p. 242. ISBN 978-0-774-80478-3.
- Birt, Peter; Copley, Vincent (2004). "Coming back to country: A conversation at Firewood Creek". In Smith, Claire; Wobst, H. Martin (eds.). Indigenous Archaeologies: Decolonising Theory and Practice. Routledge. pp. 249–264. ISBN 978-1-134-39155-4.
- Gray, J. (1930). "Notes on native tribe formerly resident at Orroroo, South Australia". The South Australian Naturalist. 12 (1): 4–6.
- Le Brun, Samuel (1886). "No. 66.-Port Pirie, forty miles of" (PDF). In Curr, Edward Micklethwaite (ed.). The Australian Race: Its origin, languages, customs, place of landing in Australia, and the routes by which it spread itself over that continent. Vol. 2. Melbourne: John Ferres, Government Printer. pp. 140–142.
- Leader-Elliott, Lyn (2014). "Cultural landscape and Sense of Place: Community and Tourism Representations of the Barossa". In Convery, Ian; Corsane, Gerard; Davis, Peter (eds.). Making Sense of Place: Multidisciplinary Perspectives. Boydell & Brewer. pp. 207–218. ISBN 978-1-843-83899-9.
- Ngadjuri Walpa Juri Lands and Heritage Association (n.d.). Ngadjuri. SASOSE Council. p. 73. ISBN 0-646-42821-7.
- Noye, Robert J. (1986). CLARE – A District History. Hawthorndene: Investigator Press. ISBN 978-1-925-26125-7.
- Simpson, Jane; Hercus, Luise (2004). "Thura-Yura as a subgroup". In Bowern, Claire; Koch, Harold (eds.). Australian Languages: Classification and the comparative method. John Benjamins Publishing Company. pp. 179–206. ISBN 978-9-027-29511-8.
- Tindale, Norman Barnett (1937). "Two legends of the Ngadjuri tribe from the middle north of South Australia". Transactions of the Royal Society of South Australia: 149–153.
- Tindale, Norman Barnett (1939). "Eagle and crow myths of the Maraura tribe, Lower Darling River, New South Wales". Records of the South Australian Museum. 6 (3). Adelaide: 243–261.
- Tindale, Norman Barnett (1974). "Ngadjuri (SA)". Aboriginal Tribes of Australia: Their Terrain, Environmental Controls, Distribution, Limits, and Proper Names. Australian National University Press. ISBN 978-0-708-10741-6.
