= Cavenagh =

Cavenagh may refer to:

== Forename ==
- Michael Cavenagh Gillett (1907–1971), British diplomat

== Surname ==
- Alastair Cavenagh (born 1964), Kenyan-based rally driver and entrepreneur
- George Cavenagh (1836–1922), Australian cricketer
- Orfeur Cavenagh (1820–1891), British army officer and administrator
- Wentworth Cavenagh (1821–1895), South Australian politician
- Winifred Cavenagh (1908–2004), British criminologist, social scientist, and academic

== Other ==
- Cavenagh, South Australia, a locality in the District Council of Peterborough
- Cavenagh Bridge, a bridge in Singapore

== See also ==
- Cavenago (disambiguation)
- Hundred of Cavenagh (disambiguation), cadastral units in South Australia
