= An Australian Girl =

1890 novel by Catherine Edith Macauley Martin

- 1894 version
- Author: Catherine Martin
- Language: English
- Genre: Novel
- Publisher: Richard Bentley and Son
- Publication date: 1890 and 1891 (abridged version)
- Publication place: England
- Media type: Print hardback
- Pages: 331 + 345 + 339 (1890); 474 (1891)
- OCLC: 13335364
- Preceded by: The Moated Grange
- Followed by: The Silent Sea

An Australian Girl (1890) is a novel by Australian author Catherine Edith Macauley Martin, first published anonymously in 1890 and 1891, and then reprinted in 1894 under her pseudonym "Mrs. Alick Macleod". The book was originally published in three volumes of 331, 345 and 339 pages, though the 1891 edition, and its 1894 reprint, abridged the text to 474 pages.

== Book summary ==
The novel is set in Australia and Europe in the 1880s. The story follows the early life of Stella Courtland, who, feeling herself unable to marry an Anglo-German intellectual Anselm Langdale, instead marries a long-term suitor who she later discovers is an alcoholic. She also discovers that Langdale is not already married as she originally thought. Following a breakdown and consideration of leaving her husband she finally decides to honour her marriage and stand by him.

This love story subplot retains a prominent role in the abridgement. A more detailed summary of the narrative of the first edition appears in The Oxford Companion to Australian Literature.

== Publication history ==
The complex history of the composition and publication of An Australian Girl is fully outlined by Rosemary Campbell in the introduction to her authoritative critical edition. Martin first submitted an earlier version of her manuscript to Macmillan under another title, "Letters of Stella von Arnim." Macmillan's reader considered it to have "a quality out of the common" that might attract "a certain audience" of "cultivated people" if the book was "materially shortened," concluding that "it is one of those perplexing books with which one does not like to part company, yet whose success is doubtful." Macmillan rejected and returned Martin's manuscript on 10 January 1889.

Within a year Martin submitted a most likely revised version of the manuscript to Richard Bentley and Son. On 1 January 1890 Bentley offered to publish an improved and recently resubmitted manuscript, which had definitely been renamed An Australian Girl by this stage, but suggested the book would benefit by a "further curtailment" of "particular passages." In this letter Bentley justified not paying Martin a large fee because the book "does not appear to us one that would captivate the masses—it appeals more to the cultivated classes." In a letter of 4 January 1891 from Rome Martin accepted Bentley's proposed terms, raised the prospect of a reprint, and thanked them "for having so kindly suggested the possibilities of the story in a different form." She said she had been thinking about further "condensation," but suggested that Bentley make the "alterations you deem most needful effected in printing" and have the proofs forwarded to her "for revision with as little delay as possible."

Bentley published significantly different versions of the book on 9 July 1890 and on 22 July 1891. The longer first edition appeared in the usual nineteenth-century form of an expensive three-volume novel. Possibly because Martin concentrated mainly on the higher level editing of her text before her imminent return to Australia, she may have been unable to comprehensively correct what appear to be a large number of misreadings of her handwriting. In her absence both the publisher and the printer allowed what Martin called a "disconcerting" number of serious errors to be printed. In a 16 August 1890 letter from Waukaringa, South Australia, written four days after she received a copy of the book, Martin forwarded a partial list of corrections she hoped could appear in a second edition. She comments that "it is rather hazardous at all times to bring a book out without personal supervision" and suggests that "Some of the slips are of the order that knock the brains out of a sentence with masterly completeness."

Bentley's abridged cheaper one-volume edition (priced at 6s.) appeared almost exactly a year after the three-volume version. This edition includes a preface, probably written by the publisher rather than the author, that slightly disingenuously refers to the correction of "a few clerical errors which escaped notice in the revision of the first edition" and "some slight omissions in one or two passages … which simplify the construction, without impairing the interest of the story." The omissions amount to around 50,000 words, or an estimated one-fifth of the original text.

Without specifying any details of an allegation of plagiarism made in "adverse criticism" by "an able and otherwise appreciative critic," the 1891 preface also defends the originality of the plot by noting that the manuscript was in the publisher's hands from November 1889, or "for several months before the other book came out." In his review, William Sharp had suggested that An Australian Girl was "markedly indebted" to Tasma's In Her Earliest Youth (1890), another Australian novel he had recently reviewed. However, while both books depict what Sharp called "the dark side of matrimony under the Southern Cross," Rosemary Campbell suggests that the superficial similarities in characterisation and plot simply involve the stereotypes commonly found in many Victorian novels

Some Australian booksellers and publishers had called for a one-volume edition for the Australian market soon after they received copies of the three-volume edition, but its production was delayed while Bentley considered what they told Martin was the difficult question of altering the work to appeal to what they hoped would be a broader audience. In a 9 January 1891 letter to Martin in Adelaide they argued for the omission of Martin's "metaphysical observations" (her heroine's concern with religious and intellectual questions) and her "incongruous" reportage of German Socialism in the third volume. What should be retained, Bentley argued, was primarily the story itself, and Martin's depictions of Australian social, botanical and animal life. Apparently with some disquiet, Martin reluctantly accepted the removal of many passages that were selected not by her but by "a literary critic of many years standing." In placating Martin, Bentley acknowledged the points in contention could "have been more expeditiously dealt with" if Martin had been in England for "direct conversation" and gave her an opportunity to review a marked-up copy of the book and to write "dele" against the designated passages she approved for deletion (and perhaps some additional matter) or "stet" against the passages she wanted restored. However, the extent to which she participated in the task of correcting and revising the text of An Australian Girl for the abridged edition is not known.

On 26 July 1894 Bentley published a 2s. 6d. cheaper reprint of their one-volume edition for sale only in Australia. A few more corrections were included in this version (and in the second impression of the 1891 edition). The preface to the second edition was omitted. While both the 1890 and 1891 editions of An Australian Girl were anonymous, the 1894 reprint is attributed to "Mrs. Alick Macleod," the pseudonym Martin adopted when her second book, The Silent Sea, was published by Bentley on 21 September 1892 and attributed to "Mrs. Alick Macleod, author of 'An Australian Girl.'"

In 1988 the first modern reprint of An Australian Girl was published by Pandora Press, with an introduction by Elizabeth Webby. This edition of the book, which reprints the 1894 text (although Rosemary Campbell notes it introduces some new typographical errors), appeared in the Australian Women Writers: The Literary Heritage series, which was instigated by Dale Spender. The Pandora edition was followed in 1999 by a new edition of the 1891 text with some emendations and annotations in the Oxford World's Classics series, edited by Graham Tulloch, and with an introduction by Amanda Nettlebeck. Rosemary Campbell's 2002 edition of the book, in the Academy Editions of Australian Literature series, provides a carefully emended and annotated restoration of the complete text of the first edition supported by an extensive introduction, explanatory notes, and a biographical essay by Margaret Allen.

A review of Rosemary Campbell's edition by Elizabeth Morrison describes this "textually reliable" restoration of the full version as "a model of scholarly-critical editing," although the reviewer expresses the "possibly heretical" view that the abridged An Australian Girl is a "more easily readable" example of what she calls "the adaption and accommodation genre of late colonial fiction" (involving "a love triangle comprising the intelligent, impressionable healthy young Australian woman, the rough diamond male Australian colonist, and the cultivated, sensitive European man," in an Australian variant of a recurrent theme that mirrors some of Henry James's fiction), while the first edition "is a masterful and uniquely Australian example of the Victorian 'faith and doubt' Bildungsroman."

== Reviews ==
In her discussion of the reception of the book Rosemary Campbell characterises the first known reviews by English critics in the Athenaeum and the Manchester Guardian as "generally enthusiastic."

Barbara Wall attributes two of the early Australian newspaper reviews in The Age and the South Australian Register to Martin's friend and mentor Catherine Helen Spence.

A reviewer in The Advertiser (Adelaide), while finding some padding in the work, stated: "The author may be congratulated on the composition of a highly ingenious story told with considerable force and pathos. It has the merit of freshness of scene and novelty of character, the localities and the scenery described in it being for the most part South Australian."

The Sydney Morning Herald and The Sydney Mail reviewer was also equivocal but saw promise: "With a little more accuracy and a good deal less philosophy we see no reason why this writer, who is apparently a "new hand," should not at the next attempt produce a really readable novel. There are passages by no means wanting in power, and when the principal characters get off their stilts and talk like ordinary mortals the dialogue is easy and natural."

== Bibliography ==
=== Original releases ===
- 1890, London: Richard Bentley and Son, publication date 9 July 1890 (first edition, 3 vols)
- 1891, London: Richard Bentley and Son, publication date 22 July 1891 (new abridged edition, 1 vol.)
- 1894, London: Richard Bentley and Son, publication date 26 July 1894 (1 vol. reprint for sale only in Australia)

=== Later editions ===
- Martin, Catherine (1988). An Australian Girl. Australian Women Writers: The Literary Heritage. London: Pandora. ISBN 0863582214. "Introduced by Elizabeth Webby"
- Martin, Catherine (1999). An Australian Girl. Oxford World Classics. New York: Oxford University Press. ISBN 0192839225. "Edited by Graham Tulloch, with an introduction by Amanda Nettelbeck"
- Martin, Catherine (2002). An Australian Girl. The Academy Editions of Australian Literature. St Lucia, Qld.: University of Queensland Press. ISBN 0702233684. "Edited by Rosemary Campbell; biographical background by Margaret Allen"

- Digital file (Limited view - search only) from the HathiTrust Digital Library
