= District Council of Coglin =

Coordinates: 32°52′59″S 139°03′47″E

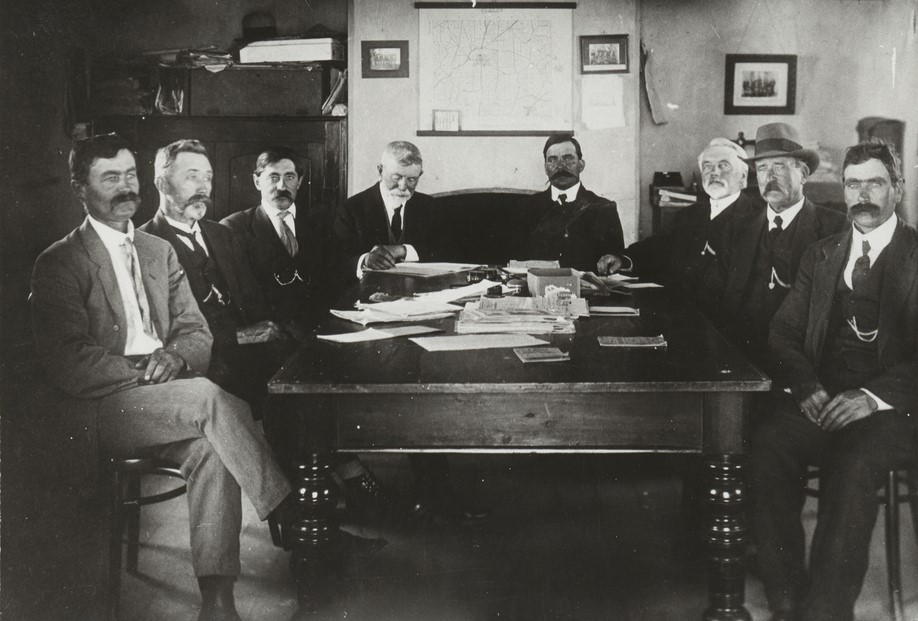
District Council of Coglin, c. 1920

The District Council of Coglin was a local government area in South Australia. It came into operation on 5 January 1888 under the provisions of the District Councils Act 1887. At its inception, it comprised the Hundreds of Cavenagh, Coglin, Gumbowie, Parnaroo, Hardy, Nackara, and Paratoo. It was divided into four wards: Coglin, Gumbowie, East and North. Meetings were held alternately at Dawson and Lancelot until 1899, and thereafter at Penn (now Oodla Wirra).

In 1923, it was responsible for a chiefly grazing and farming district of 595,200 acres. It was reported in that year that of the five officially surveyed townships in the municipality, three now had no residents, with the surviving towns being Penn (30 residents) and Dawson (20 residents). The total population was 970, residing in 226 dwellings, with the total ratable capital value of the district being £230,000. The council was abolished in 1935 following a Local Government Commission report that advocated cutting the number of municipalities in South Australia from 196 to 142: the report saw the Coglin council merge with the District Council of Yongala and a severed portion of the Corporate Town of Peterborough to form the District Council of Peterborough.

== Chairmen ==
- H. Richards (1901)
- E. O'Brien (1918-1919)
- G. L. Ferguson (1919-1923)
- J. Philp (1923-1924)
- E. D. Sawers (1934)
