= County of Herbert =

Herbert
- Cadastral division
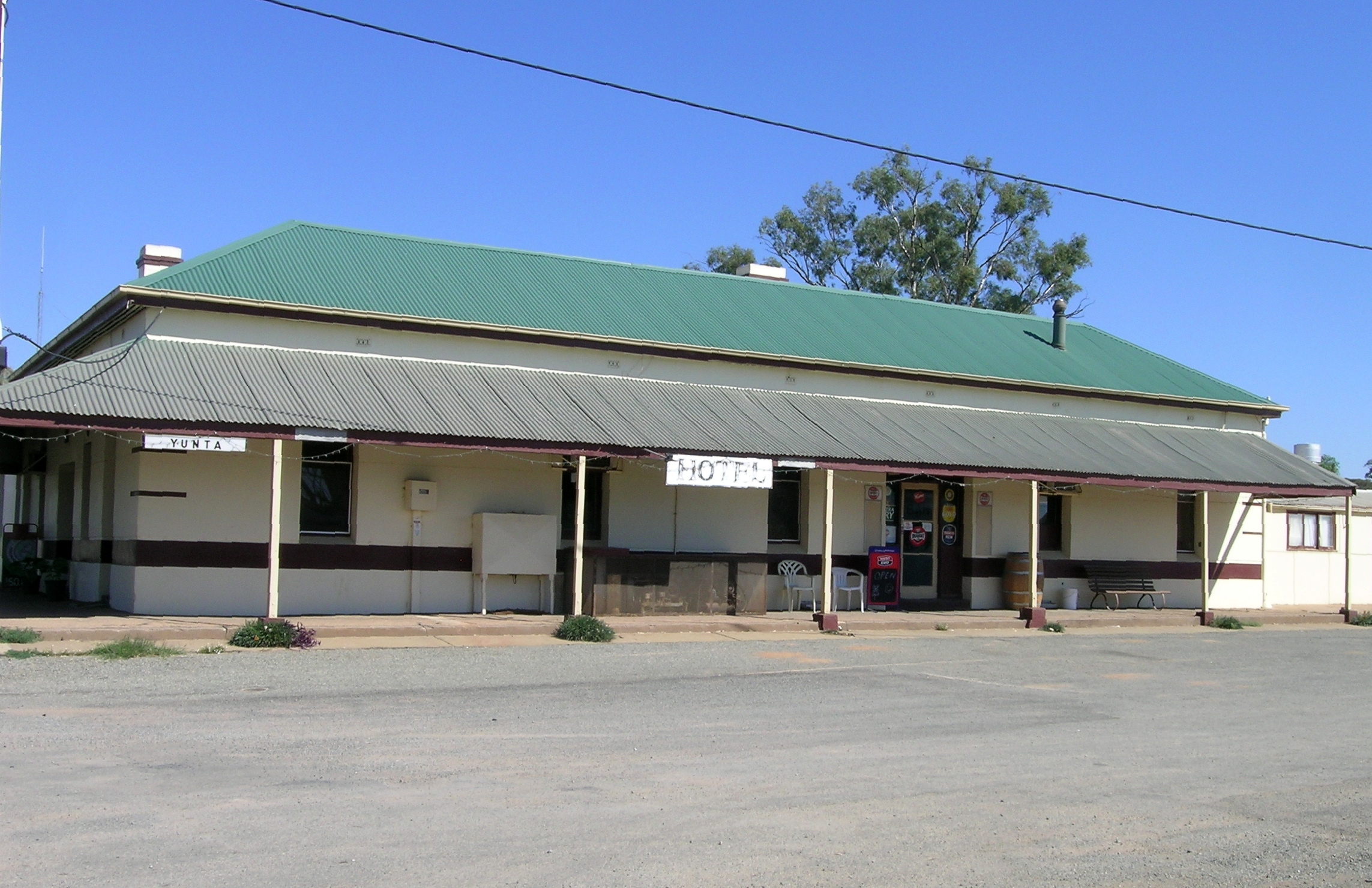
- The Yunta Hotel

- Coordinates: 32°39′07″S 139°17′45″E
- Country: Australia
- State: South Australia
- Region: Far North; Yorke and Mid North
- LGA(s): District Council of Peterborough Pastoral Unincorporated Area
- Location: 55 km (34 mi) NE of Peterborough
- Established: 18 January 1877

Area
  - Total: 3,970 km^{2} (1,532 sq mi)
Lands administrative divisions around Herbert
Granville	Lytton	Lytton
Dalhousie	Herbert	-
Dalhousie	Kimberley	-
- Location; Adjoining counties

County of Herbert is a cadastral unit located in the Australian state of South Australia that covers land to the east of the Flinders Ranges about 55 kilometres (34 mi) north-east of the town of Peterborough. It was proclaimed in 1877 and named after a prominent man of the time with either a title or a surname containing the name ‘Herbert’. It has been partially divided in the following sub-units of hundreds – Cavenagh, Coglin, Minburra, Nackara, Paratoo and Waroonee.

== Description ==
The County of Herbert covers the part of South Australia extending from the east side of the Flinders Ranges for a distance of about 77 kilometres (48 mi) from its western boundary and for about 52 kilometres (32 mi) from its northern boundary. It is bounded by the following counties - Lytton to the north and north-east, Kimberley to the south, Dalhousie to the south-west and the west, and Granville to the north-west.

The county’s principal town is Yunta which is located in its eastern side.

The county is served by one principal road, the Barrier Highway, which passes through the county in a north-east direction from Terowie in the south through the hundreds of Coglin and Nakara to the town centre in Yunta in the east of the county and onward to Mannahill.

The Crystal Brook-Broken Hill railway line passes through the county in a north-easterly direction passing from Peterborough in the south entering via the Hundred of Nackara to Yunta in the east and then onward to Broken Hill.

The county is located both within the local government area of the District Council of Peterborough which occupies the county’s south-west corner and the state’s Pastoral Unincorporated Area where municipal services are provided by the Government of South Australia via agencies such as the Outback Communities Authority (OCA). Within the county, the OCA provides services to the community living in Yunta.

Land use within the part of the county located within the District Council of Peterborough is ’primary production’ and is concerned with “agricultural production and the grazing of stock on relatively large holdings.” Land use within the part located in the 'pastoral unincorporated area' is also concerned with primary industry with pastoralism being the dominant activity.

== History ==
The County of Herbert was proclaimed on 18 January 1877. One source states it was named after “Lord Herbert” while another states that it was named after “Sir Robert Herbert, son of an Under-Secretary for the Colonies.”

The following hundreds have been proclaimed within the county - Minburra in 1877, Cavanagh and Coglin in 1878, and Nackara, Paratoo and Waroonee in 1880.

The hundreds of Cavenagh, Coglin, Nackara and Paratoo formed part of the land area gazetted as the District Council of Coglin on 5 January 1888 under the District Councils Act 1887 and have been part of the District Council of Peterborough since 1 May 1935.

== Constituent hundreds ==
=== Location of hundreds ===
The hundreds are laid out from west to east from the boundary with the County of Dalhousie in three rows as follows:

- the northern row consisting of Minburra and Waroonee,
- the middle row consisting of Cavenagh and Paratoo, and
- the southern row consisting of Coglin and Nackara.

The total area of the hundreds accounts for 2,290 square kilometres (884 sq mi) out of the county’s total area of 2,940 square kilometres (1,135 sq mi).

=== Hundred of Cavenagh ===
The Hundred of Cavenagh (32°39′54″S 138°57′09″E) was proclaimed on 31 October 1878. It covers an area of 330 square kilometres (127 sq mi) and was named after Wentworth Cavenagh, a former member of the South Australian Parliament. Its extent is fully occupied by the locality of Cavenagh.

=== Hundred of Coglin ===
The Hundred of Coglin (32°49′05″S 138°56′57″E) was proclaimed on 31 October 1878. It covers an area of 320 square kilometres (123.5 sq mi) and was named after P. B. Coglin, a member of the South Australian Parliament at the time. Its extent is largely within the boundaries of the localities of Dawson with a portion on its southern boundary being in Oodla Wirra.

=== Hundred of Minburra ===
The Hundred of Minburra (32°32′19″S 138°57′20″E) was proclaimed on 18 January 1877. It covers an area of 390 square kilometres (152 sq mi) and its name is derived from “an Aboriginal word, applied to a station held by J., W.C. and T.R. Bowman in the 1860s under pastoral lease no. 1528.” Its extent is fully occupied by the locality of Minburra Plain.

=== Hundred of Nackara ===
The Hundred of Nackara (32°49′04″S 139°13′29″E) was proclaimed on 5 August 1880. It covers an area of 382 square kilometres (147.5 sq mi). Three sources have been suggested for its name. Geoffrey Manning suggests that it may be “a corruption of the Aboriginal nakkare, associated with a certain folklore, that is a game forbidden to boys and young men during the ceremonies of introduction to manhood”, Rodney Cockburn suggests “the name of a spring under a hill which was opened out in the form of a tank”, while a publication called ‘Day’s Railway Nomenclature’ suggest the “Aboriginal words for ‘my brother’ and ‘looking forward’.” Its extent aligns with the boundaries of the locality of Nackara, apart from two minor differences on the north and south boundaries.

=== Hundred of Paratoo ===
The Hundred of Paratoo (32°40′03″S 139°13′48″E) was proclaimed on 5 August 1880. It covers an area of 390 square kilometres (151 sq mi) and its name is derived from an “Aboriginal word given to a property held by Messrs Dare and Mundy circa 1858 (lease no. 1892)” and whose meaning is “unknown.” Its extent aligns with the boundaries the locality of Paratoo, apart from a minor difference on its southern boundary.

=== Hundred of Waroonee ===
The Hundred of Waroonee (32°30′46″S 139°13′23″E) was proclaimed on 5 August 1880. It covers an area of 470 square kilometres (183 sq mi) and its name is derived from “an Aboriginal word meaning ‘place of burning’ and this is made intelligible in a myth that tells of the burning of the crow by his opponent, the eagle, after he had trapped him in a cave on Waroonee Hill.” Its extent aligns with the boundaries of the locality of Waroonee.

=== Gallery ===
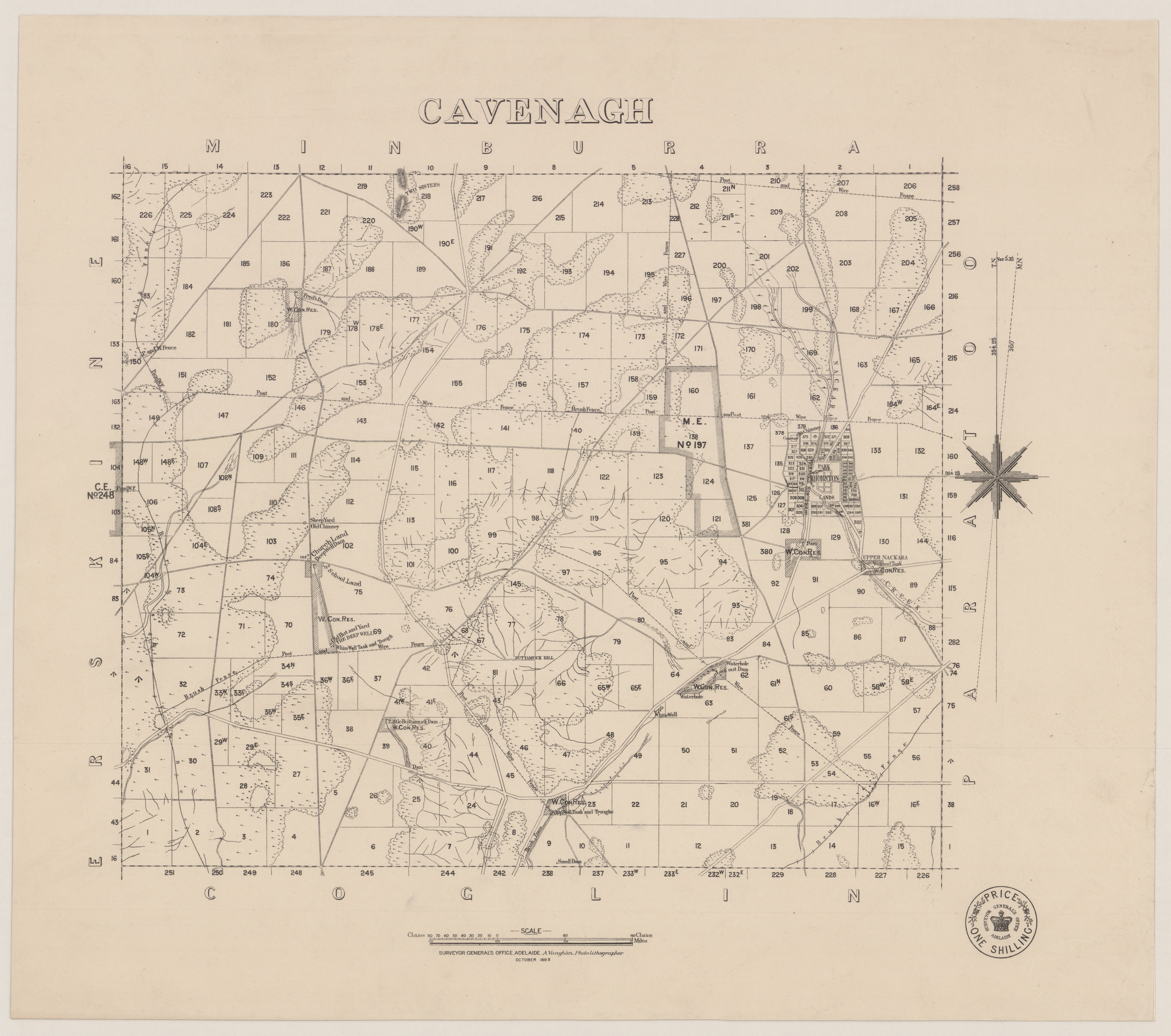
Hundred of Cavenagh, 1893

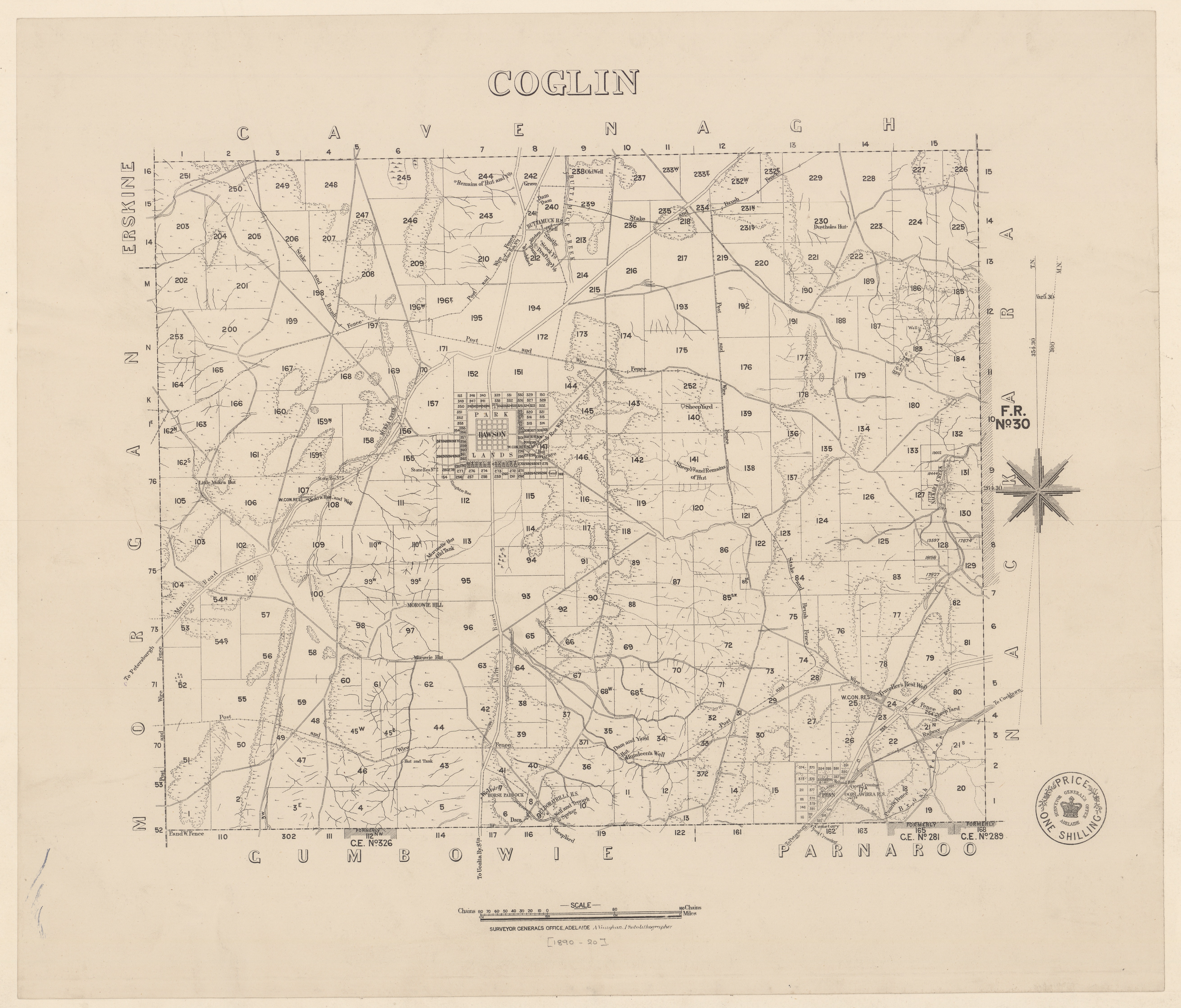
Hundred of Coglin, 1890

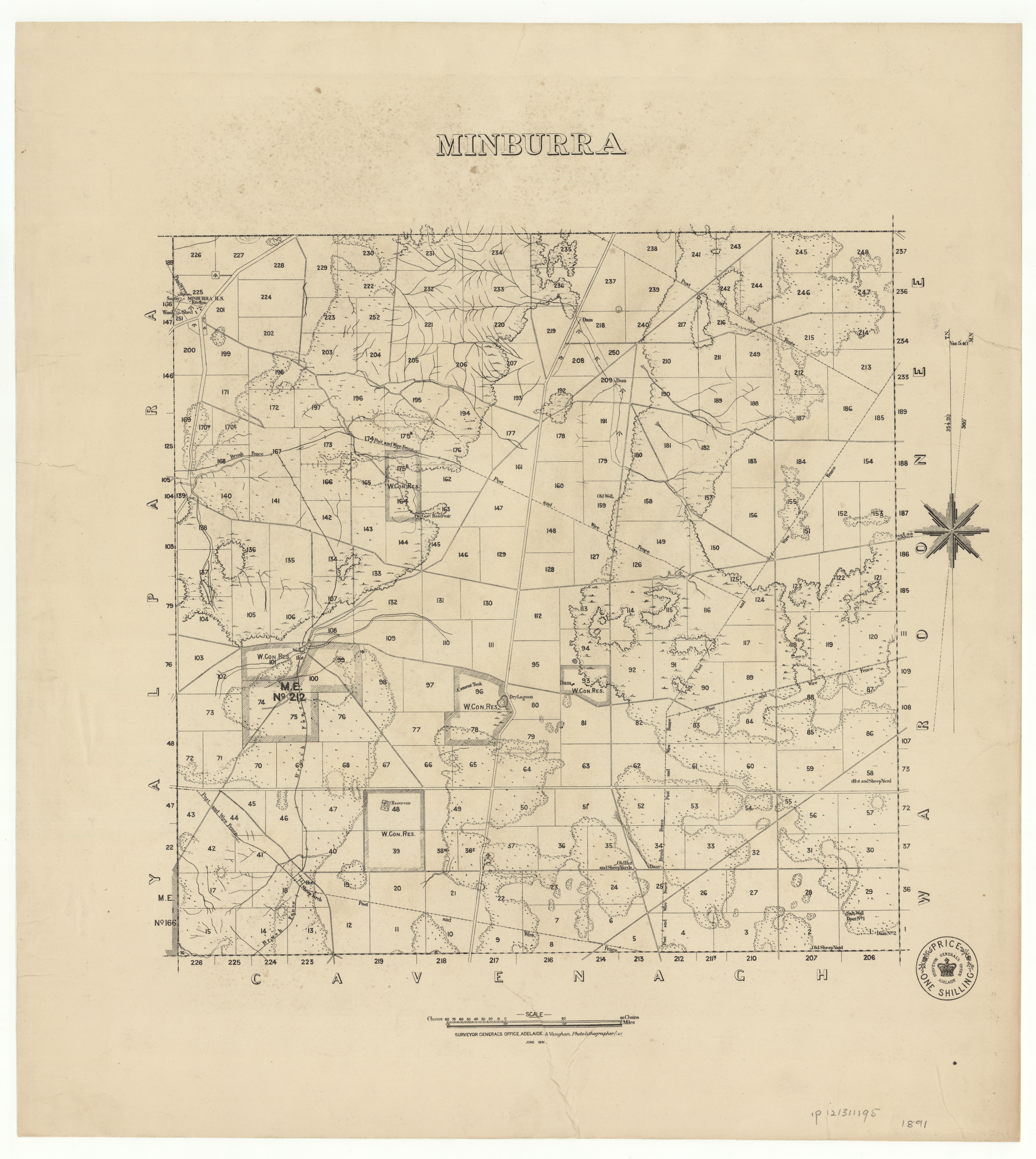
Hundred of Minburra, 1891

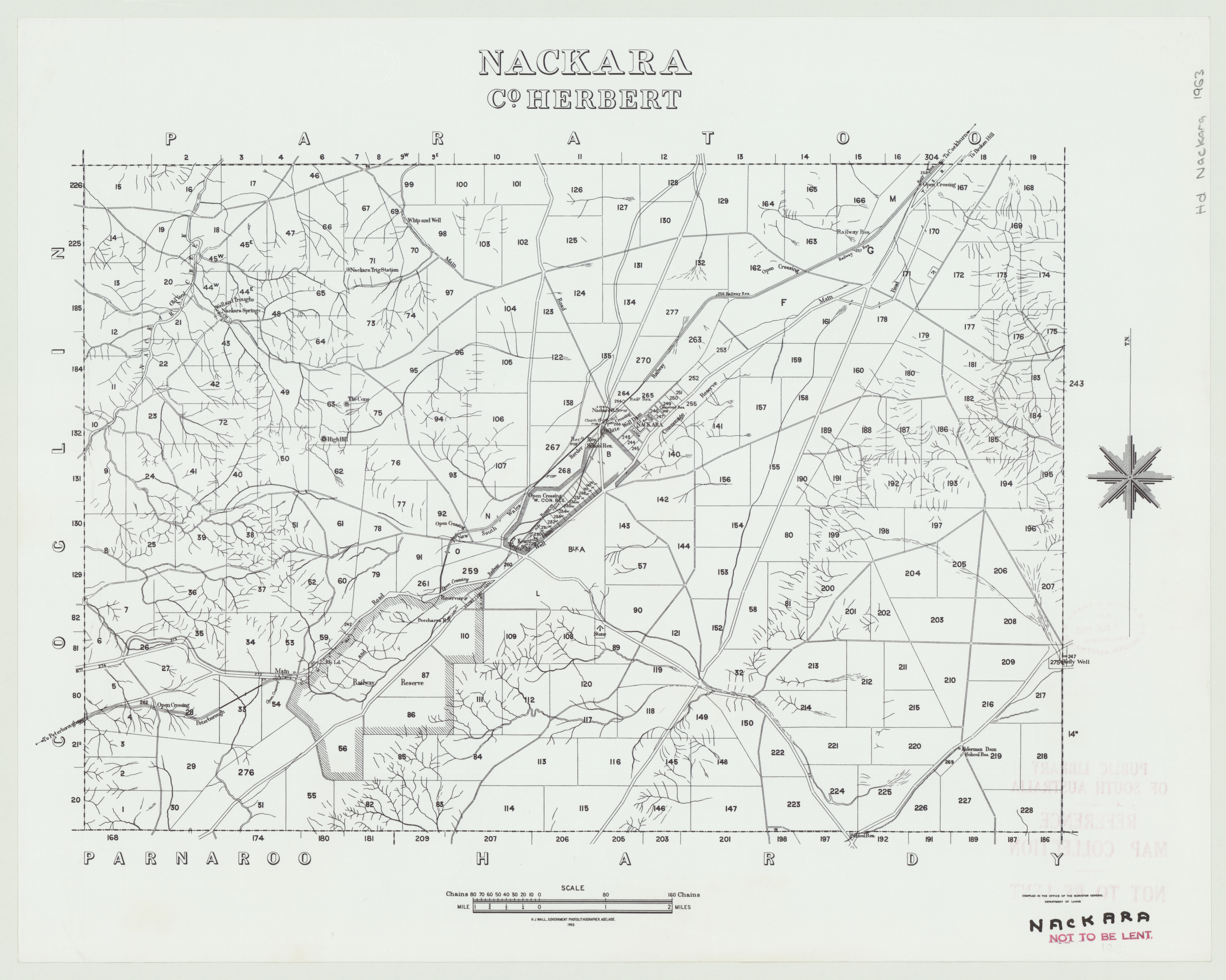
Hundred of Nackara, 1963

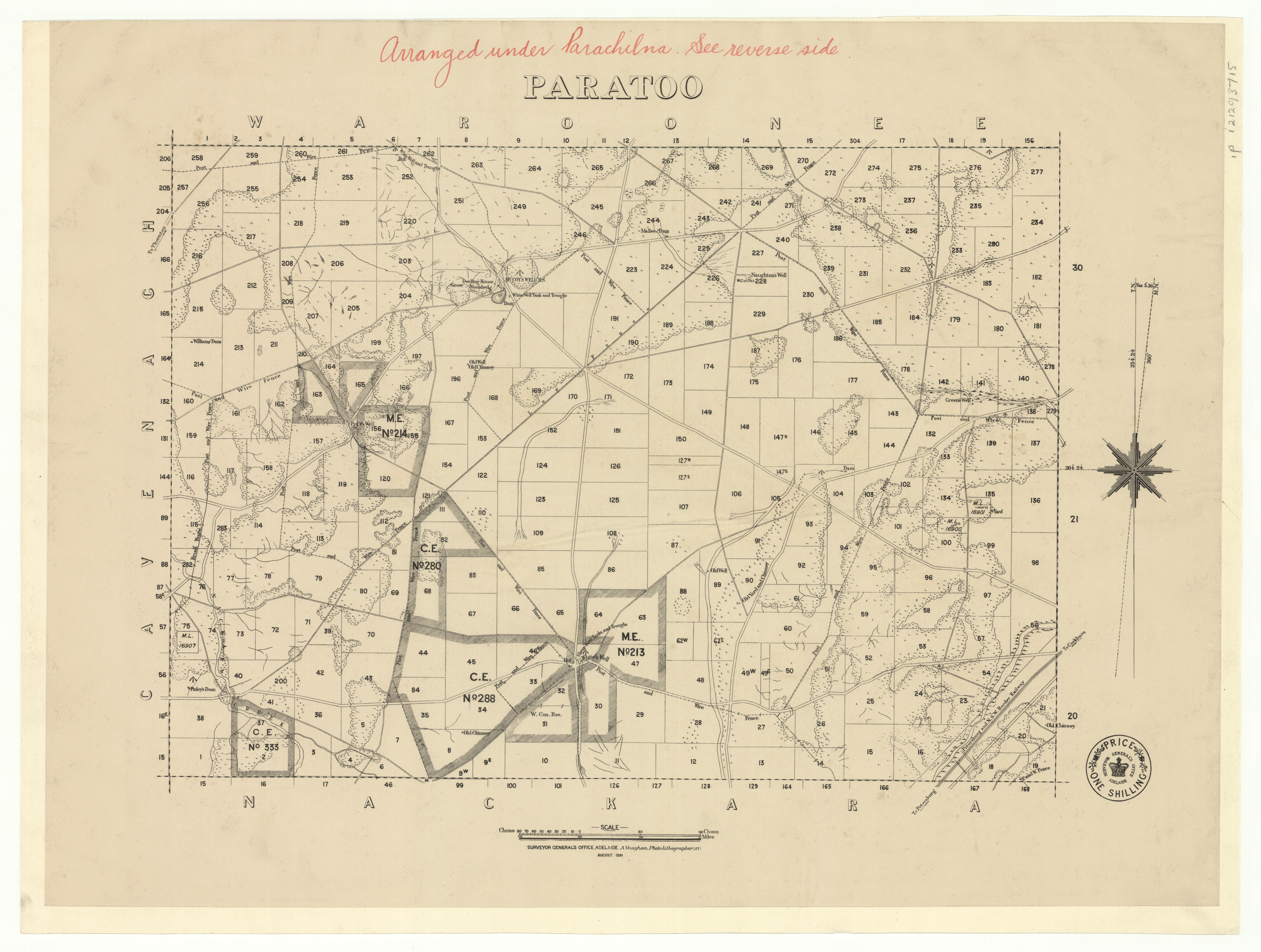
Hundred of Paratoo, 1891

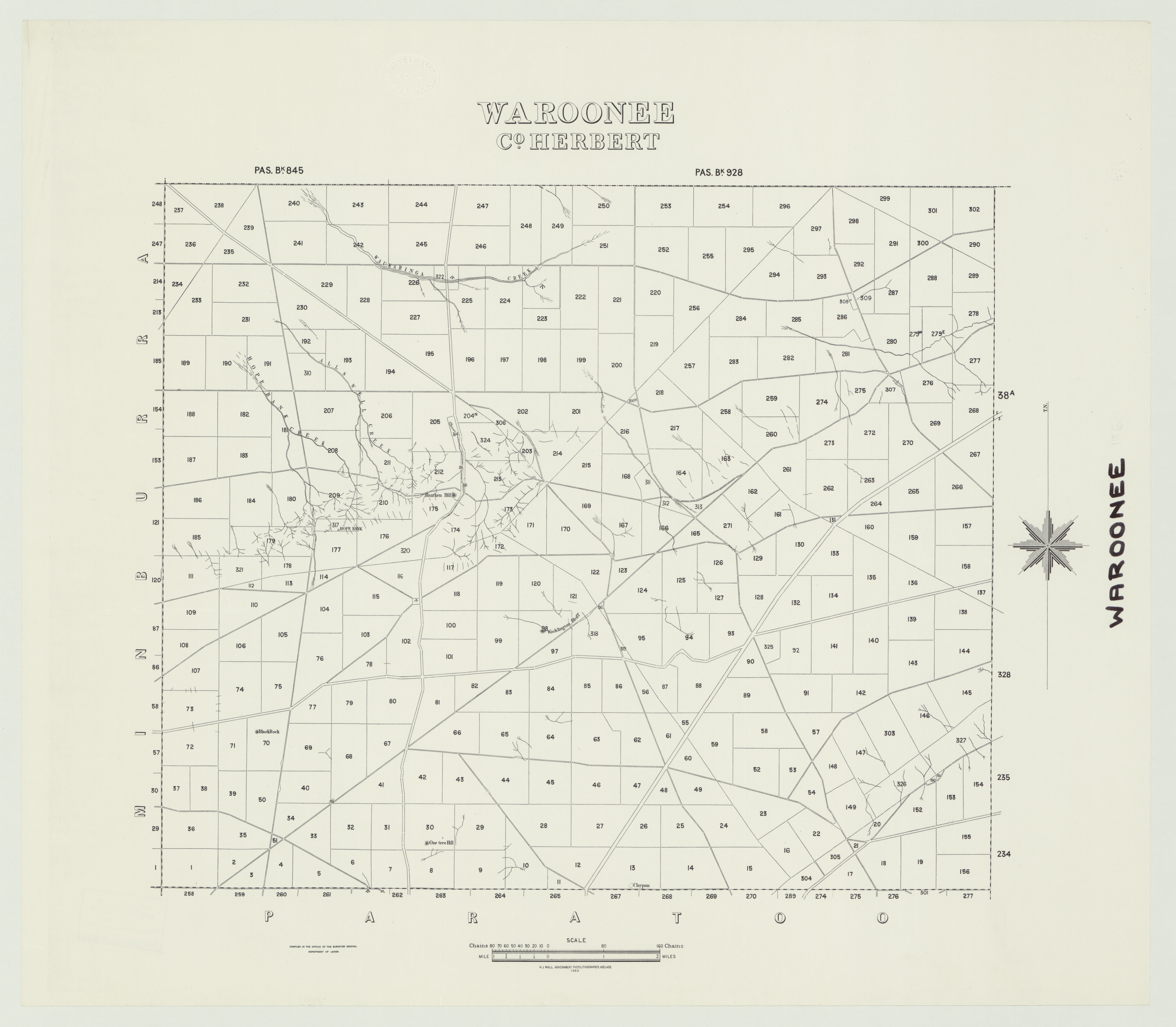
Hundred of Waroonee, 1960

== See also ==
- Lands administrative divisions of South Australia
