= Paratoo, South Australia =

Paratoo South Australia
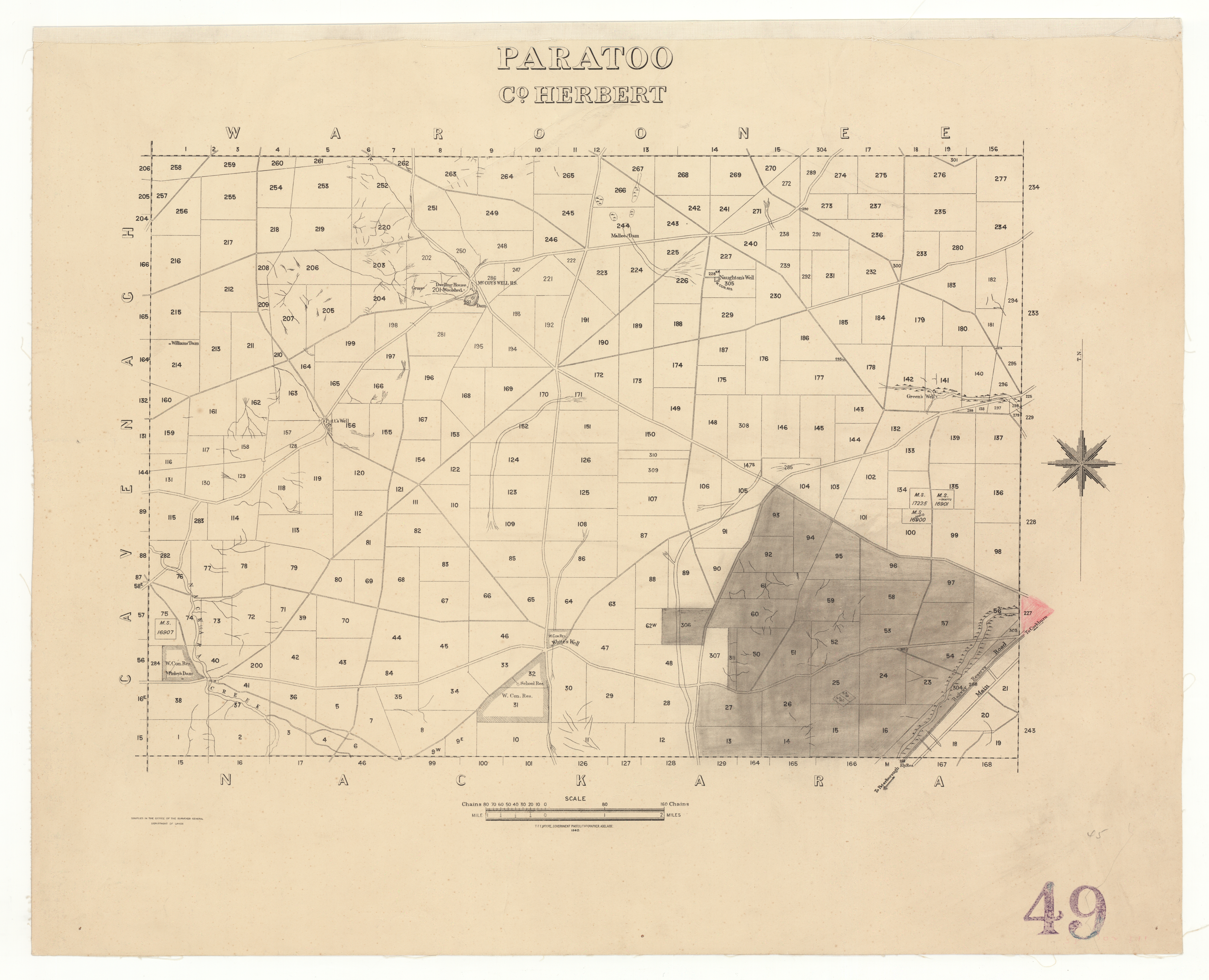
- Hundred of Paratoo (drawing dated 1940) whose boundary coincides with the locality of Paratoo as of 2013.

- Coordinates: 32°44′00″S 139°19′57″E
- Population: 5 (SAL 2021)
- Established: 31 August 2000
- Postcode(s): 5422
- Elevation: 303 m (994 ft)(railway station)
- Area: 390 km^{2} (150.6 sq mi)
- Time zone: ACST (UTC+9:30)
  - Summer (DST): ACDT (UTC+10:30)
- Location: 254 km (158 mi) NE of Adelaide; 52 km (32 mi) NE of Peterborough; 22 km (14 mi) SW of Yunta, South Australia
- LGA(s): District Council of Peterborough
- Region: Yorke and Mid North
- County: Herbert
- State electorate(s): Stuart
- Federal division(s): Grey
Mean max temp	Mean min temp	Annual rainfall
24.6 °C; 76 °F	9.5 °C; 49 °F	207.9 mm 8.2 in
Suburbs around Paratoo:
Minburra Plain	Waroonee	Yunta
Cavenagh	Paratoo	Yunta; Grampus
Dawson	Nackara	Grampus
- Footnotes: Adjoining localities

Paratoo is a locality in the Australian state of South Australia located about 254 kilometres (158 mi) north-east of the state capital of Adelaide and about 52 kilometres (32 mi) north-east of the municipal seat in Peterborough.

Its boundaries were created on 31 August 2000 for the "long established name" which is derived from the Paratoo Railway Station and ultimately from an Aboriginal word of unknown meaning "given to a property held by Messrs Dare and Mundy circa 1858 (lease no. 1892)." Land was added to its northern side on 26 April 2013 to "prevent the intersect of parcels with the creation of the new locality of Waroonee." Its boundaries coincide with those of the cadastral unit of the Hundred of Paratoo.

The sites of the following places whose names include the 'Paratoo' are actually located to the east of the locality and the hundred in the adjoining locality of Grampus - Paratoo, a place which is gazetted as a 'unbounded locality', the Paratoo Homestead which was associated with the "station held by Dare & Mundy circa 1885" and the Paratoo Post Office which was opened in 1864. On 27 December 1960 the driver of the Broken Hill Express was killed in a derailment caused by buckled rails.

The Barrier Highway and the Crystal Brook-Broken Hill railway line pass through the locality's south-east corner in a north-easterly direction from Peterborough.

Land use within the locality is 'primary production' and is concerned with "agricultural production and the grazing of stock on relatively large holdings".

Paratoo is located within the federal division of Grey, the state electoral district of Stuart and the local government area of the District Council of Peterborough.

== See also ==
- Railway accidents in South Australia
