= Swainsona viridis =

Scientific classification
- Kingdom: Plantae
- Clade: Tracheophytes
- Clade: Angiosperms
- Clade: Eudicots
- Clade: Rosids
- Order: Fabales
- Family: Fabaceae
- Subfamily: Faboideae
- Genus: Swainsona
- Species: S. viridis

Binomial name
- Swainsona viridis J.M.Black

Species of legume

Swainsona viridis, commonly known as creeping Darling pea, is a species of flowering plant in the family Fabaceae and is endemic to an area near the border between New South Wales and South Australia. It is a prostrate perennial plant with imparipinnate leaves with 5 to 13 narrowly egg-shaped leaflets with the narrower end towards the base, and racemes of 5 to 10 purple flowers.

== Description ==
Swainsona viridis is a prostrate perennial plant that typically grows to a height of up to 10 cm (3.9 in) with ridged stems. The leaves are imparipinnate, mostly 10–60 mm (0.39–2.36 in) long with 5 to 13, (usually 7 to 9) egg-shaped leaflets with the narrower end towards the base, the side leaflets 5–15 mm (0.20–0.59 in) long and 4–8 mm (0.16–0.31 in) wide with green, leaf-like stipules mostly 5–10 mm (0.20–0.39 in) long at the base of the petiole. The flowers are purple, arranged in racemes of 5 to 10 on a peduncle 1–2 mm (0.039–0.079 in) wide, each flower 7–12 mm (0.28–0.47 in) long on a sparsely hairy pedicel about 2 mm (0.079 in) long. The sepals are joined at the base to form a tube about 2 mm (0.079 in) long, with teeth about the same length, or longer or shorter than the tube. The standard petal is 7–12 mm (0.28–0.47 in) long and wide, the wings 5–8 mm (0.20–0.31 in) long and the keel 7–10 mm (0.28–0.39 in) long and 5–6 mm (0.20–0.24 in) deep. Flowering occurs from August to November, and the fruit is a narrowly cylindrical pod 25–35 mm (0.98–1.38 in) long and about 3 mm (0.12 in) wide with the twisted remains of the style about 5 mm (0.20 in) long.

== Taxonomy and naming ==
Swainsona viridis was first formally described in 1924 by John McConnell Black in the Flora of South Australia from specimens collected near Yunta. The specific epithet (viridis) means "green".

== Distribution ==
Creeping Darling pea grows in sandy or stony areas on the banks or in the beds of creeks from near the Flinders Ranges of South Australia to near Broken Hill in New South Wales.

== Conservation status ==
Swainsona reticulata is listed as "endangered" in New South Wales, under the Biodiversity Conservation Act 2016.
