= Dawson, South Australia =

Dawson
- Town
- Coordinates: 32.804°S 138.975°E
- Country: Australia
- State: South Australia
- Region: Yorke and Mid North
- LGA: District Council of Peterborough
- Location: 25 km (16 mi) NE of Peterborough
- Established: 19 May 1881 (town); 31 August 2000 (locality)

Government
  - State electorate: Stuart
  - Federal division: Grey

Population
  - Total: 3 (SAL 2016)
- Postcode: 5720
- County: Herbert
Localities around Dawson
Erskine	Cavenagh	Paratoo
Erskine; Minvalara	Dawson	Nackara
Minvalara	Ucolta	Parnaroo; Oodla Wirra

Dawson is a rural locality in the Mid North region of South Australia, situated in the District Council of Peterborough. It covers the entirety of the cadastral Hundred of Coglin, with the exception of the small town of Oodla Wirra.

Boundaries for the locality were created on 31 August 2000 and it was given the "long established name" of Dawson which is derived from the Government Town of Dawson whose site is located within the boundaries of the locality.

== History ==
The government town of Dawson was surveyed in February 1881; it was often referred to as Coglin in its early years. It was founded as part of an attempt to establish wheat farming north of Goyder's Line, but this proved unsuccessful in the long term, and the Crystal Brook-Broken Hill railway line bypassed Dawson, instead running further south through Oodla Wirra and Peterborough. Coglin Post Office opened in 1881, was renamed Dawson Post Office in April 1882, and closed on 14 August 1971.

The 1880s saw the construction of Primitive Methodist, Anglican and Catholic churches; the former Our Lady of Mount Carmel Catholic Church (1886) survives and is listed on the South Australian Heritage Register. The Dawson Hotel was built in 1883. A public school opened in 1885 after several years of agitation from local residents. Local government came to the area in 1888 with the District Council of Coglin; it met alternately at Dawson and Lancelot until 1899, when the council seat shifted to Penn (now Oodla Wirra). At its peak, Dawson also had multiple stores, churches, an institute, an agricultural bureau, and a blacksmith. Information on a proposed school appeared in 1883; Dawson School, opened in 1885, closed in 1964.

The town had a football team, in the 20th century.

In 1949, it was suggested that all unsold allotments be purchased by the government and, by 1960, this had been accomplished and the town was diminished. Its post office, opened as 'Coglin' in January 1881, closed on 14 August 1971.

In 1954 the government began to resume town blocks if they had never been purchased or if the owners were not traceable. In 1960 the town was officially abolished as a town.

Very little of the former town survives today. It contains the heritage-listed former Catholic church, the Dawson Hall, and the former school, now a private residence. The Dawson Cemetery on Dawson Gorge Road and Dawson War Memorial on Dawson-Peterborough Road also remain. The Dawson Hotel closed in 1961, and survives as a substantial ruin at Dawson's main crossroads.

== Name ==
It has been conjectured that the name derives from one of several people:

- The most likely candidate is Robert Kearsley Dawson (1798-1861), a Lt-Colonel in the Royal Engineers and friend of Governor Jervois. Colonel Dawson was educated at the Royal Military Academy at Woolwich
- Robert Dawson (1776-1860), a tutor to young officers of the Royal Engineers in the art of topographical drawing also an associate of Governor Jervois.
- Henry Dawson, the first mail contractor between Burra and Outalpa and after whom Dawson Dam (Hundred of Rees) was named. This explanation was dismissed by Geoff Manning.
