= Catherine Edith Macauley Martin =

Australian novelist

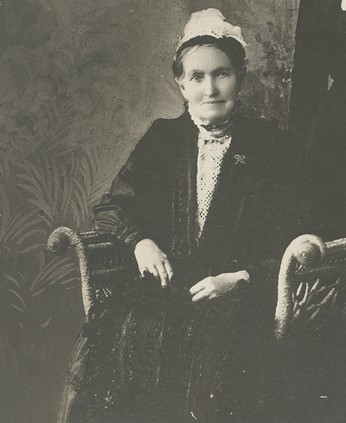
- Born: 1848
- Died: 15 March 1937 (aged 88–89)
- Occupation: Writer
- Writing career
- Subject: Australian fiction
- Notable work: An Australian Girl

Catherine Edith Macauley Martin (1848 – 15 March 1937) was an Australian novelist who used the pseudonyms M.C. and Mrs Alick MacLeod, also published anonymously.

== Early life ==
Martin was born in Ben Mohr Estate, Snizort, Isle of Skye, Inverness-shire in 1847, the fourth and youngest daughter of Samuel Nicholson Mackay and Janette Mackay, (née McKinnon) (died 23 June 1891) emigrated to South Australia in 1855 and shortly after moved to Naracoorte where many Scottish farmers had settled. Her father died in 1856, and little is known of how the family survived and how the children were educated, but Martin certainly had a grounding in French and German. It was common in such circumstances for a well-educated widow to run a small school from home, providing both a family income and education for her own children.

== Career ==
By 1874, she was living at Mount Gambier, where she and her sister Mary ran a school for girls. In that year she published a volume of poems, and her name remained unknown to the public, though she had published poems and verse translations in the Adelaide and Mount Gambier newspapers from 1868 or earlier. She came to Adelaide, where she befriended Catherine Helen Spence and did journalistic work, including serial stories, The Moated Grange in 1877 and A Bohemian Born as "M.C." for the Christmas period 1878.

In 1877 she was appointed a clerk in the Education Department, an unusual job for a woman, and welcomed, but lost it in 1885, three years after her marriage, a case of discrimination, suggests the Oxford Companion. In 1882, she married Frederick Martin, an accountant for the Alma goldmine near Waukaringa, where they lived for a time. In 1890, she published anonymously An Australian Girl based on her experiences at Waukaringa, and published as "Mrs Alick MacLeod". Her mother died in Mount Gambier in 1891. Catherine and Frederick Martin undertook two extensive tours of Europe in 1890–1904 and 1904–1907, during which she wrote a series of articles, Vignettes of Travel, for the Melbourne Age and Leader, also picked up by the (Boorowa, New South Wales) News. She also published a serial story At a Crisis for the Adelaide Observer April–June 1900.

She drew on her travel experiences again for her next novel, The Old Roof Tree: Letters of Ishbel to Her Half-brother, Mark Latimer, published in 1906. After her husband died in 1909, Martin made a few more trips overseas, keeping abreast of politics and international events. She contributed to the Victorian Review, the Melbourne Review, The Age, The Leader, The South Australian Chronicle and Weekly Mail, and the Observer Miscellany. In 1923 appeared The Incredible Journey, by C. E. M. Martin.

Martin died in the Adelaide suburb of Hyde Park on 15 March 1937, in her ninetieth year.

== Critiques ==
Despite being ahead of her time in her understated approach to the usual themes of bush life and her sceptical view of married life, anticipating Henry Handel Richardson and Barbara Baynton, Martin's work has often been dismissed as "conventional nineteenth-century romance", and only two works, Australian Girl and Incredible Journey were, belatedly in 1987, reprinted.

An Australian Girl has much of the flavour of George Eliot with its themes of personal loss leading to a kind of awakening in religious humanism, written by a woman of thoughtful and philosophic mind. The Incredible Journey, Iliapo and Polde, who traverse hundreds of kilometres of desert country to rescue a boy who has been kidnapped by a white man, a similar theme to Doris Pilkington Garimara's Follow the Rabbit-Proof Fence (1996) and its 2002 film adaptation Rabbit-Proof Fence by Phillip Noyce.

== Family ==
Catherine Edith Macauley Mackay married Frederick "Fred" Martin (9 April 1848 – 27 April 1909) on 4 March 1882 at St Paul's Church, Adelaide. They had a home "Melness" in Hackney, South Australia, but no children. Fred's sister Lucy Martin (1839–1863) was married to John Howard Clark, editor of the South Australian Register; another sister, Annie Montgomerie Martin, was a noted teacher and headmistress.

Her siblings included four brothers, several of whom became wealthy pastoralists, and left sizable endowments to their young sister. One named a daughter Catherine in her honour.

- John Shaw Mackay (c. 1827 – 14 April 1873) of Penshurst, Victoria,
- Donald Mackay (1832 – 24 December 1901) was a sheep farmer at Yule and Benmore Stations.

- Samuel Peter Mackay (1864 – 11 May 1923) inherited Mundabullangana, died after having his leg amputated. His estate was valued at £204,870.

- Elsie Mackay (actress) (20 February 1893 – 1963)

- Roderick Louden MacKay (1864 – 2 September 1948) married Margaret Macpherson (1864–1956) on 3 June 1891
- Catherine Edith Macauley Mackay married Robert Joseph Cusack (c. 1851 – 20 September 1937) had a home "Tralee", 72 Allen-street, East Fremantle

- Roderick Louden MacKay (died between 1882 and 1887) married Emily Armit Manning (6 December 1853 – 1929) on 2 June 1876. He was pioneer of Yule station near Nickol Bay and Mundabullangana Station, West Australia, also called Mundabulanga? Her father opposed her bringing up the children. She married again, to Rev. Robert Hanlin (9 July 1855 – ) on 21 August 1888. She was known as an art weaver.

- James Eric Mackay (24 June 1881 – 24 May 1897) who was adopted by (Presbyterian) Rev. Robert Hanlin, studied at Way College, where he died of typhoid fever.

- Donald McDonald MacKay M.L.C. (1845 – 30 January 1904) married Emily Charlotte Vincent (died 1 June 1954) on 21 February 1893. They had a home "Braeside" at 50 Stirling Street, Fremantle.

and sisters

- Flora Mackay (died 19 April 1912) (later Bethune);
- (second eldest) Mary Jessie Mackay (died 10 February 1920), and
- Margaret Annie MacDonald Mackay (married Walter Harry Lorking on 22 February 1881).

== Selected works ==
=== Novels ===
- The Moated Grange : An Original Tale (1877)
- An Australian Girl (1890)
- The Silent Sea (1892)
- The Old Roof Tree (1906)
- The Incredible Journey (1923)

=== Poetry ===
- The Explorers and Other Poems (1874)

== Sources ==
- Serle, Percival (1949). "Martin, Catherine Edith Macauley". Dictionary of Australian Biography. Sydney: Angus & Robertson.
