= Hundred of Cavenagh =

The Hundred of Cavenagh refers to a cadastral unit. It could be

- Hundred of Cavenagh (Northern Territory)
- Hundred of Cavenagh (South Australia)
