= Hundred of Waroonee =

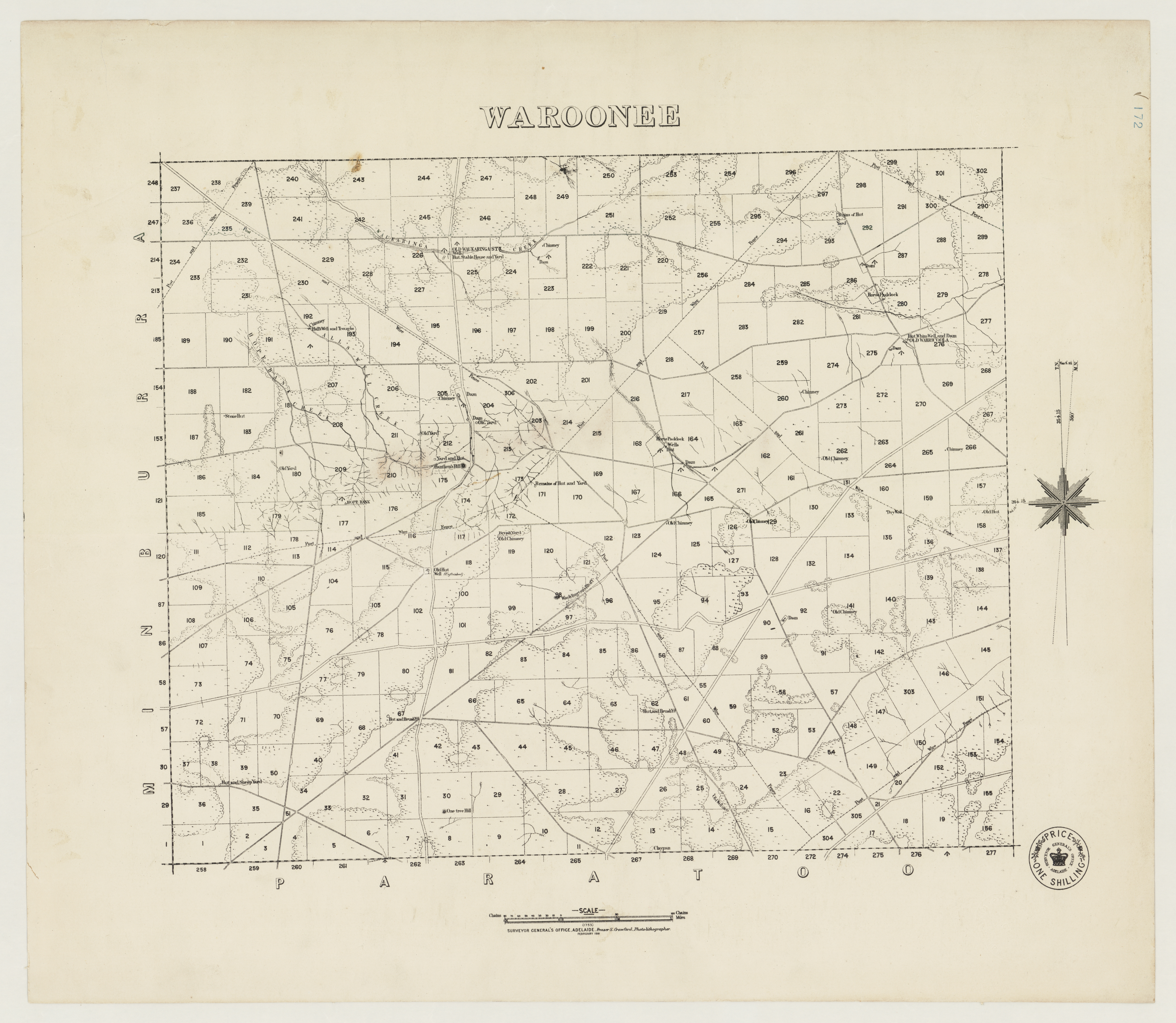
File:Hundred of Waroonee, 1881

The Hundred of Waroonee is a hundred of the County of Herbert, South Australia, founded in 1880.

Waroonee covers an area of 470 square kilometres (183 sq mi) and its name is derived from an Aboriginal word meaning ‘place of burning'.
