= Cavenago =

Cavenago may refer to:

- Cavenago d'Adda, a comune in the province of Lodi, Lombardy, Italy
- Cavenago di Brianza, a comune in the province of Monza and Brianza, Lombardy, Italy

== See also ==
- Cavernago
- Cavenagh (disambiguation)
