= Disappearance of Gus Lamont =

2025 disappearance in Australia

- Date: 27 September 2025
- Duration: Missing for 1 year, 1 month and 23 days
- Location: Oak Park Station, Yunta, South Australia; 32.84°S 139.60°E
- Outcome: Unsolved
- Missing: Gus Lamont (aged 4 years)

Augustus "Gus" Lamont (born 2020 or 2021) is an Australian missing person who, at the age of four, disappeared from his family's remote South Australian homestead, approximately 40 kilometres (25 mi) south of Yunta, on the evening of 27 September 2025.

The case saw coverage both across Australia and internationally due to the unusual circumstances of the disappearance.

== Disappearance ==
Gus was reportedly last seen outside by his grandmother (Shannon) around 5:00 pm on 27 September 2025, when she says she saw him playing on a mound of dirt. According to her, at 5:30 pm she went outside to call him in, only to find him missing. The family told police they searched for three hours before calling police.

== Investigations ==
Official searches for Lamont were undertaken from 27 September 2025 to 24 November 2025.

During the first investigation, a large-scale search effort was undertaken in the days following his disappearance, which lasted 10 days, but yielded no tangible pieces of evidence, such as footprints or clothing. Gus's grandmother testified she had seen tyre tracks of a medium-sized car on the property. She also claimed she found a footprint on the dam of her property which belonged to Gus, although the evidence was dismissed by the police. The search was subsequently scaled back from 7 October 2025. Multiple footprints were found; however, none was determined to be connected to Lamont's disappearance. The police search leveraged the South Australian State Emergency Service (SES), drones and helicopters using infrared technology, and Aboriginal trackers. The search also included 48 members of the Australian Defence Force (ADF), as well as trailbike and ATV teams, and a large number of community and family members. The South Australian Police (SAPOL) described it as "one of [their] largest, most intensive and most protracted searches ever undertaken". Once the search was scaled back, the case was transferred to the Missing Persons Investigation Section of SAPOL.

A second search was launched from 14 October 2025, focusing on the property and the surrounding 5–6 kilometres (3.1–3.7 mi) radius of Oak Park Station. Over 80 personnel, including 18 SAPOL officers, 82 ADF personnel, and 7 SES volunteers participated in the renewed search. Thirty-three vehicles, a drone, and two utility terrain vehicles were used during the search. Despite the thorough coverage, no sign or belongings of Lamont was found.

A third search was launched, involving the inspection of a dam located 600 metres (660 yd) from where he was last seen. Spanning 2 days beginning on 30 October 2025, the South Australian Police drained 3.2 million litres of water from the dam. It was then inspected by divers and aerial scans for heat signatures or anomalies were conducted, but no trace of Lamont was found.

On 24 November 2025, the police launched a fourth renewed search targeting six previously unsearched "uncovered and unfenced" mine shafts on the property and surrounding area. Drones with thermal imaging were used to map and identify shafts before physical inspection. A day later, the search of the six mine shafts began, involving specialised teams and equipment. The shafts were located 5.5–12 kilometres (3.4–7.5 mi) from the homestead, and some were shallow enough for visual inspection while the deeper shafts were up to 20 metres (66 ft). On 26 November, the search was concluded, having found an insufficient amount of evidence.

=== Misinformation ===
In October 2025, false claims and AI-generated images supposedly of Gus circulated on social media as supposed leads into the case. Seven News reported that Facebook's AI-powered search feature was returning false search results about the case.

=== Major crime declaration ===
On 5 February 2026, SAPOL declared the disappearance a major crime, with a resident of the sheep station known to Lamont identified as a suspect. Police ruled out Lamont's parents as suspects, and said the timeline of events given by the suspect was inconsistent with the timelines given by others.

== See also ==
- List of people who disappeared mysteriously (2000–present)
- Kidnapping
