= Hundred of Coglin =

Division in the County of Herbert, Australia

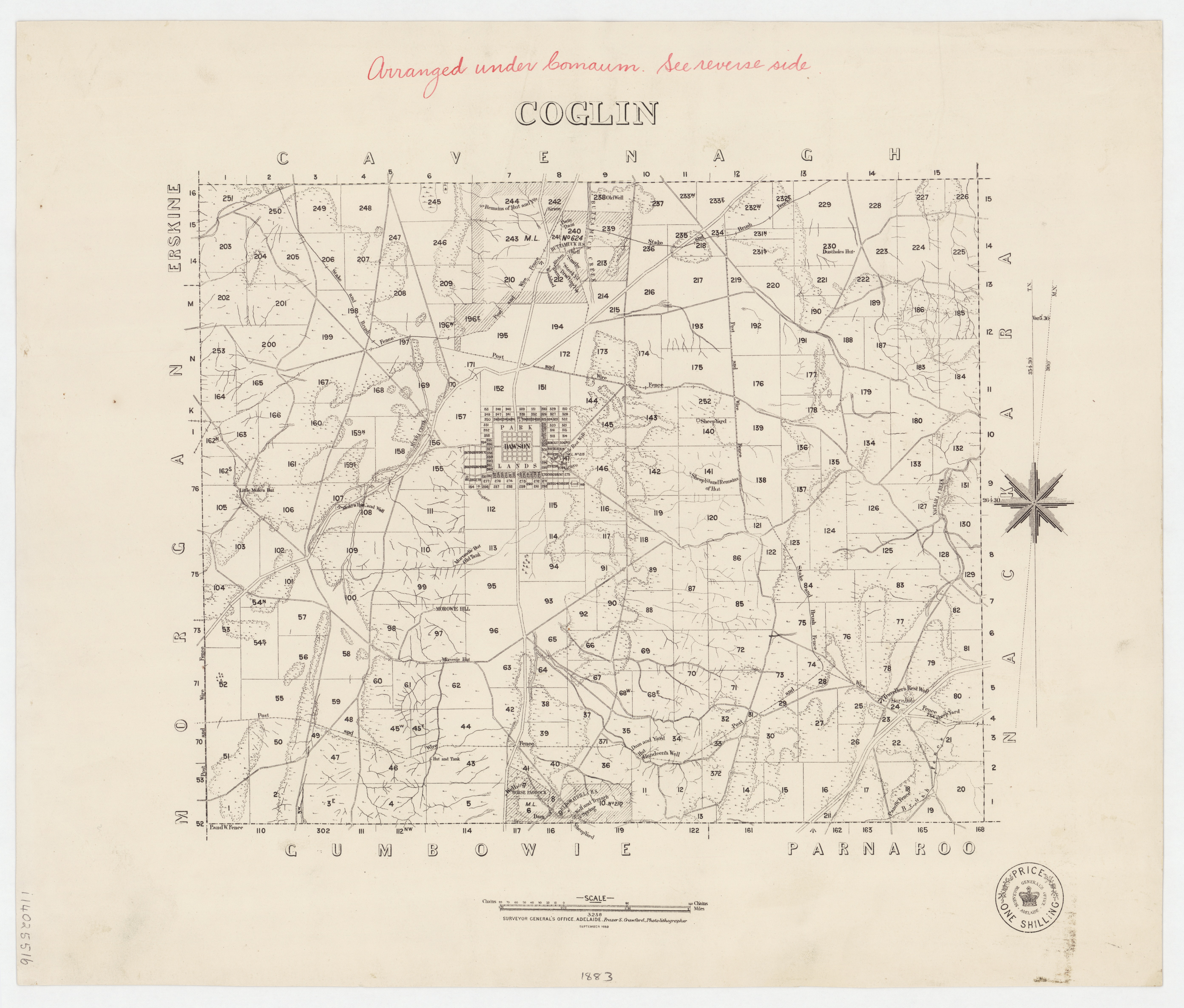
The Hundred of Coglin, 1883

The Hundred of Coglin is a hundred within the County of Herbert, South Australia and proclaimed in 1878.

The main town of the hundred was Dawson, South Australia with Oodla Wirra, South Australia lying just outside of the hundred.
