= Burrowa News and Marengo, Binalong, Murrumburrah and Cootamundra Reporter =

Former newspaper in New South Wales, Australia

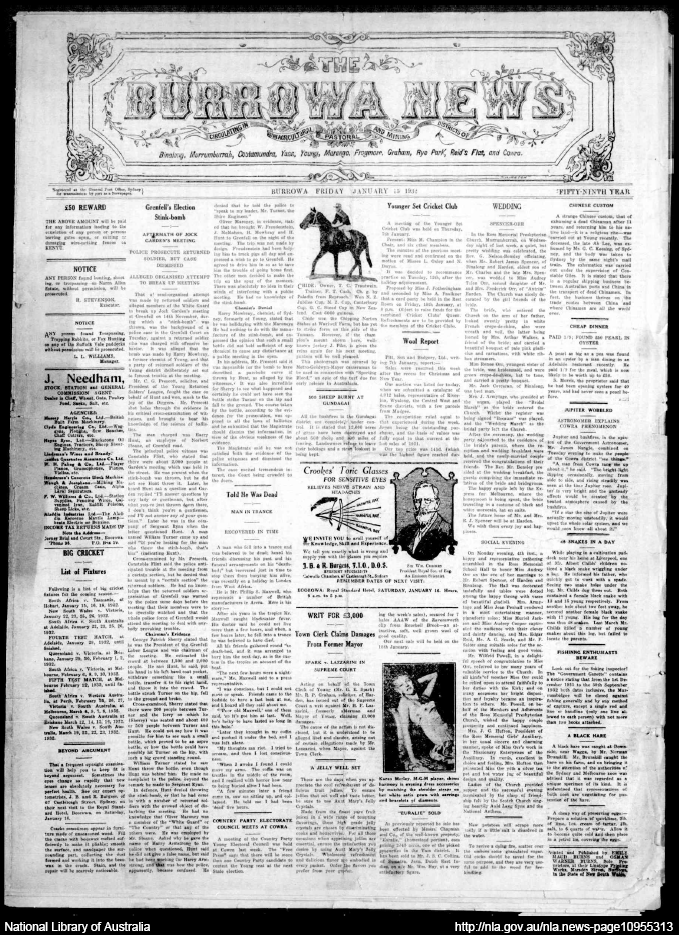
The Burrowa News 15 Jan 1932

The Burrowa News and Marengo, Binalong, Murrumburrah and Cootamundra Reporter (also published as the Burrowa News) was a weekly English language newspaper published in Boorowa, New South Wales, Australia.

== History ==
First published 1873 by George Eason, the Burrowa News and Marengo, Binalong, Murrumburrah and Cootamundra Reporter was published until 26 January 1951. The paper was continued by the Boorowa News.

== Digitisation ==
The paper has been digitised as part of the Australian Newspapers Digitisation Program project of the National Library of Australia in cooperation with the State Library of New South Wales.

== See also ==
- List of newspapers in Australia
- List of newspapers in New South Wales
