= Waukaringa, South Australia =

Waukaringa South Australia
- Coordinates: 32°18′02″S 139°26′10″E
- Established: 1 November 1888 (town); 29 May 1997 (locality)
- Abolished: 8 July 1982 (town)
- Postcode(s): 5440
- Time zone: ACST (UTC+9:30)
  - Summer (DST): ACDT (UTC+10:30)
- Location: 303 km (188 mi) NE of Adelaide; 35 km (22 mi) N of Yunta
- LGA(s): Pastoral Unincorporated Area
- Region: Far North
- County: Lytton
- State electorate(s): Stuart
- Federal division(s): Grey
Mean max temp	Mean min temp	Annual rainfall
24.7 °C; 76 °F	9.5 °C; 49 °F	202.5 mm 8 in
Suburbs around Waukaringa:
	Melton Station
Melton Station	Waukaringa	Melton Station
	Melton Station
- Footnotes: Adjoining localities

Waukaringa is a locality in the Australian state of South Australia located about 303 kilometres (188 mi) north-east of the state capital of Adelaide and about 35 kilometres (22 mi) north of Yunta in the state's Far North region.

The name was first used for a town proclaimed on 1 November 1888 and which was formally declared to have ceased to exist on 8 July 1982. Boundaries which include the former town were created for the locality on 29 May 1997 and which are completely surrounded by the locality of Melton Station.

The area was initially settled in 1873 with the discovery of gold. In 1890, Waukaringa was estimated to have had a population of 750. The former town of Waukaringa is now a ghost town after being abandoned in the 1950s. Ruins of only a few buildings remain, principally the former Waukaringa Hotel.

The goldfields near Waukaringa produced approximately 1,427 kilograms (3,146 lb) of gold between 1873 and 1969. The main mines in the goldfield were Alma and Victoria, Alma Extended, West Waukaringa and Balaclava. A stone chimney from the Alma and Victoria mine is still visible. The Alma and Victoria Mine Site and Structures are listed on the South Australian Heritage Register.

The setting for The Silent Sea, written by Catherine Edith Macauley Martin under the pseudonym Mrs. Alick Macleod, was based on mining and life at Waukaringa. The book was partly written while Martin lived in the town.

Australian Rules footballer Harold Oliver was born in Waukaringa in 1891.

Waukaringa is located within the federal division of Grey, the state electoral district of Stuart and the Pastoral Unincorporated Area of South Australia.
