= Winifred Cavenagh =

British criminologist, social scientist and academic

Winifred Cavenagh OBE
- Born: Winifred Elizabeth Speakman; 12 November 1908; Manchester, England
- Died: 7 May 2004 (aged 95)

Academic background
- Education: London School of Economics; University of Bonn

Academic work
- Discipline: Social scientist
- Sub-discipline: Criminology; social policy
- Institutions: Ministry of Labour; University of Birmingham

Winifred Elizabeth Cavenagh OBE (née Speakman; 12 November 1908 – 7 May 2004) was a British criminologist, social scientist, and academic. She joined the University of Birmingham as a lecturer in social studies in 1946 and was made Professor of Social Administration and Criminology in 1972: she retired from academia in 1976 and was appointed professor emeritus. Outside of her university career, she served as a local magistrate, on numerous boards, and, after studying law and qualifying, worked as a barrister.

== Early life and education ==
Cavenagh was born 12 November 1908 in Manchester, England to Arthur Speakman and Ethel Speakman (née Butterworth). She was educated at Broughton and Crumpsall High School for Girls, a school in Salford, Greater Manchester. She studied economics at the London School of Economics, University of London, graduating with a Bachelor of Science (BSc) degree. After graduating, she undertook a further year of study at the University of Bonn. She was awarded a Doctor of Philosophy (PhD) degree by the University of Birmingham in 1959 for her monograph The Child and the Court.

== Career ==
From 1931 to 1938 she worked as a sales manager at Lewis's, a chain of department stores. After two years employed in social work, she joined the Ministry of Labour as the chief welfare officer for Birmingham. She served in that role from 1941 till the end of the Second World War in 1945.

In 1946, Cavenagh joined the University of Birmingham as a lecturer in social studies. That year, she also became a co-opted expert member of the Birmingham City Council Education Committee. In 1960, she was promoted to senior lecturer. She spent 1971 as a visiting professor in criminology at the University of Ghana. Having returned to Birmingham, she was appointed Professor of Social Administration and Criminology in 1972. She retired from full-time academia in 1976 and was appointed emeritus professor.

In 1949, Cavenagh became a magistrate in the City of Birmingham. She choose to study law alongside her university teaching, and was called to the bar (qualifying as a barrister) at Gray's Inn in 1964. She served as a deputy chairperson at the magistrates' court from 1970 to 1978. She was added to the supplemental list, effectively retiring from her judicial duties, in 1978.

== Personal life ==
In 1938, the then Winifred Speakman married Hugh Cavenagh. The marriage brought one step son. Her husband predeceased her, dying in 1967.

== Honours ==
In the 1977 New Year Honours, Cavenagh was appointed an Officer of the Order of the British Empire (OBE) for services to Wages Councils.

== Selected works ==
- Cavenagh, Winifred E. (1953). Four Decades of Students in Social Work.
- Cavenagh, Winifred E. (1959). The Child and the Court. London: Victor Gonnancz.
- Cavenagh, Winifred E. (1967). Juvenile Courts, The Child and the Law. London: Penguin Books.
