= Oodla Wirra, South Australia =

Oodla Wirra South Australia
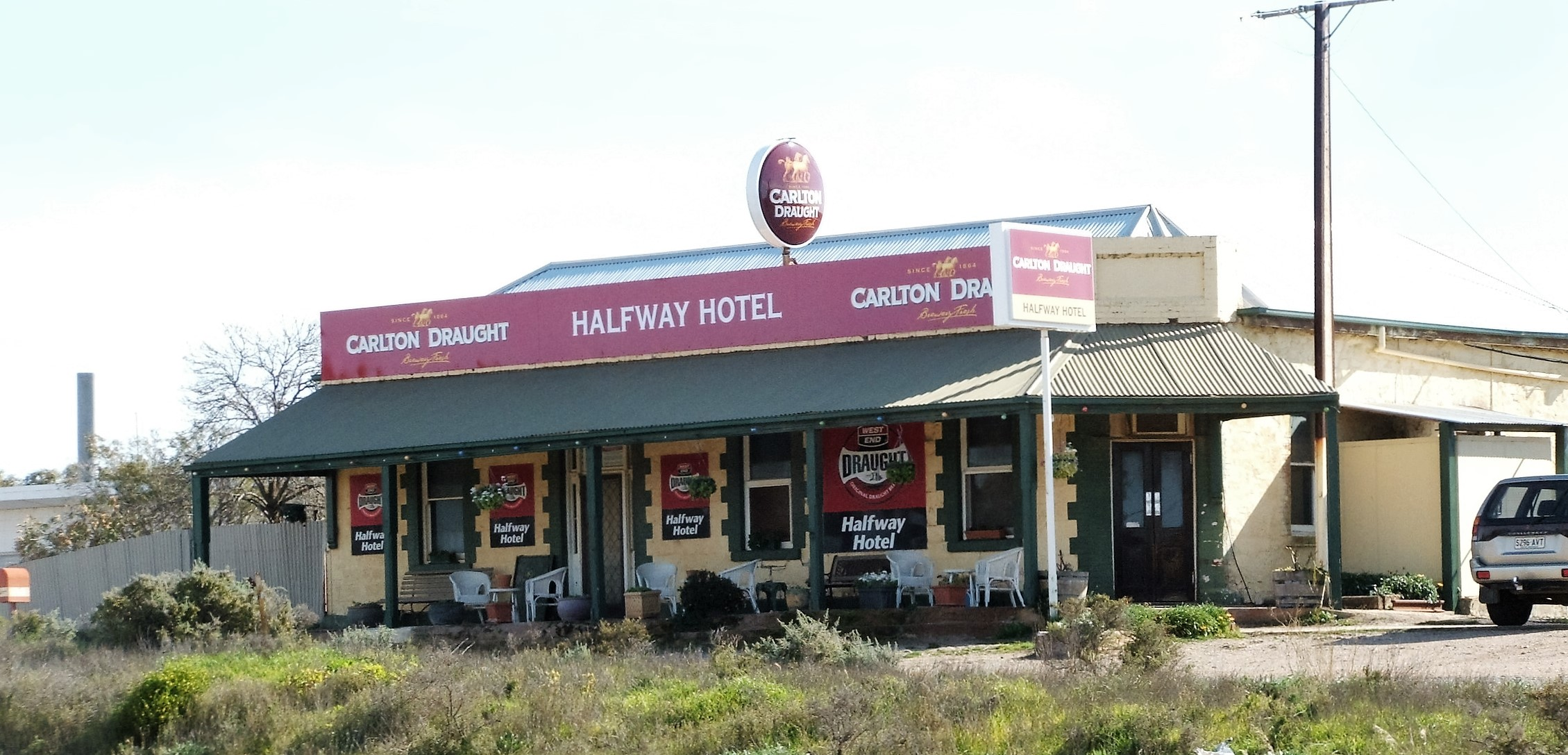
- Halfway Hotel at Oodla Wirra

- Coordinates: 32°52′59″S 139°03′47″E
- Population: 5 (SAL 2021)
- Established: 1889
- Elevation: 505 m (1,657 ft)
- Location: 259 km (161 mi) N of Adelaide
- LGA(s): District Council of Peterborough
- Region: Yorke and Mid North
- County: Herbert
- State electorate(s): Stuart
Localities around Oodla Wirra:
Dawson		Nackara
	Oodla Wirra
Ucolta	Parnaroo

Oodla Wirra (formerly Penn) is a small town in the upper Mid North of South Australia. It is on the Barrier Highway approximately halfway from Adelaide to Broken Hill.

When the railway was built in 1880, a siding was provided, named Oodla Wirra. Soon after, a town was surveyed near the siding, but it was named Penn. This naming conflict continued until 1940, when the town was renamed Oodla Wirra, to match the railway station.

== Railway ==
Oodla Wirra is a former railway town, as it was on the narrow-gauge railway between Port Pirie and Cockburn (where it connected to the Silverton Tramway to Broken Hill). When the Commonwealth Government replaced the narrow gauge line with a standard gauge line, the revised route passed south and east of the town.

A railway employee was killed in a shunting accident in the Oodla Wirra railyards in 1909.

In 1889, ironstone flux was mined from a failed silver mine a few miles away, and carted to Oodla Wirra to be transported by rail to the smelters at Port Pirie.

The town later boasted a flour mill, school and hotel named Halfway way hotel as it was halfway between Adelaide and Broken Hill.
