= Cavenagh, South Australia =

Cavenagh
- Suburb
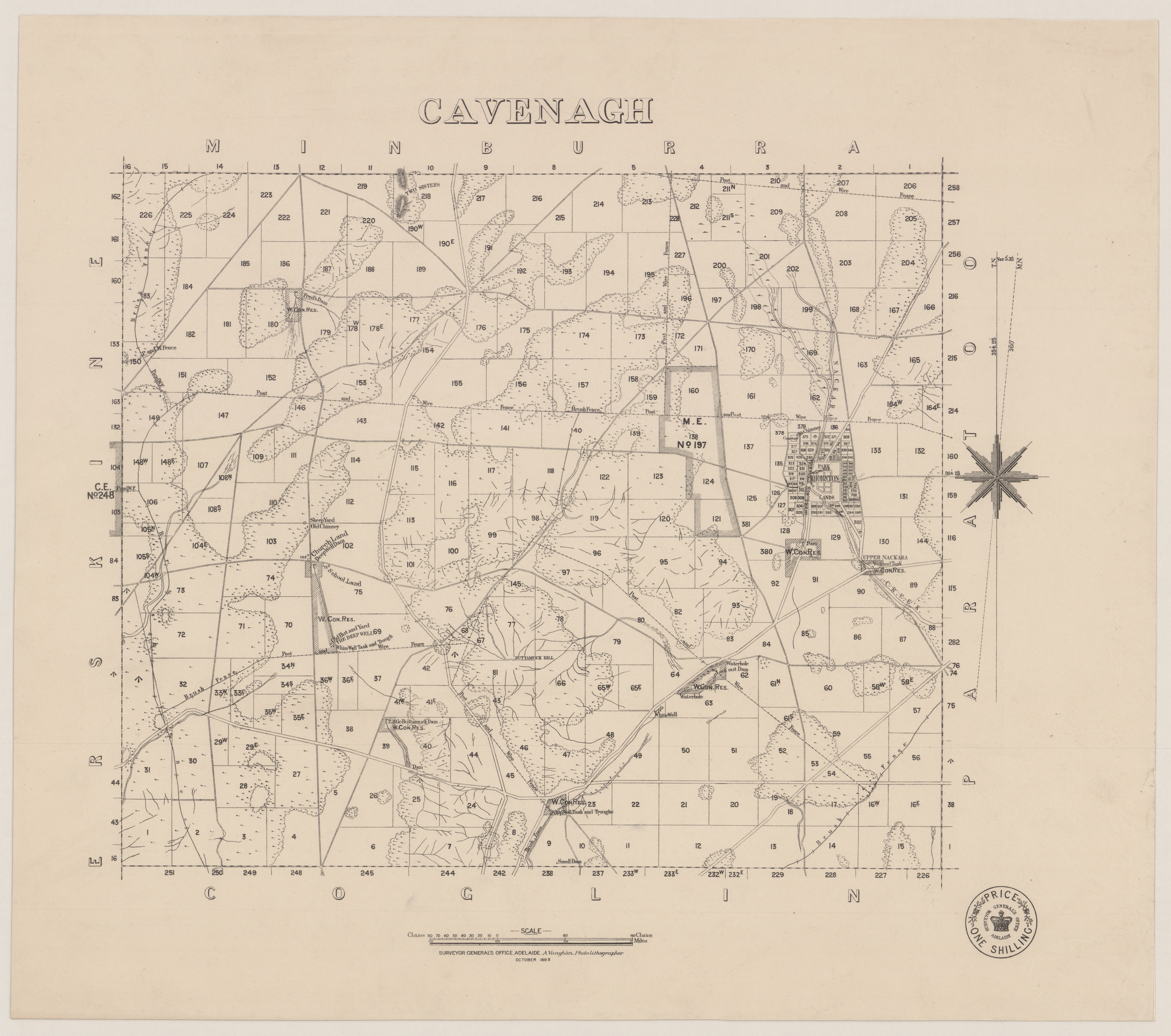
- Hundred of Cavenagh (drawing dated 1893) whose boundaries coincide with the locality of Cavenagh as of 2000.

- Coordinates: 32°40′11″S 138°56′50″E
- Country: Australia
- State: South Australia
- Region: Yorke and Mid North
- LGA: District Council of Peterborough
- Location: 247 km (153 mi) N of Adelaide; 37 km (23 mi) NE of Peterborough
- Established: 31 August 2000

Government
  - State electorate: Stuart
  - Federal division: Grey

Area
  - Total: 330 km^{2} (130 sq mi)
- Time zone: UTC+9:30 (ACST)
  - Summer (DST): UTC+10:30 (ACST)
- Postcode: 5422
- County: Herbert
- Mean max temp: 21.9 °C (71.4 °F)
- Mean min temp: 7.3 °C (45.1 °F)
- Annual rainfall: 365.7 mm (14.40 in)
Suburbs around Cavenagh
Yalpara	Minburra Plain	Waroonee
Erskine	Cavenagh	Paratoo
Erskine	Dawson	Nackara
- Locations; Adjoining localities

Cavenagh is a locality in the Australian state of South Australia located about 247 kilometres (153 mi) north of the state capital of Adelaide and about 37 kilometres (23 mi) north-east of the municipal seat in Peterborough.

Cavenagh ’s boundaries were created on 31 August 2000 for the “local established name” which is derived from the cadastral unit of the Hundred of Cavenagh and which aligns with those of the hundred. The locality includes the site of the now-ceased Government Town of Thornton which was gazetted on 1 December 1881 and which “ceased to exist” on 23 May 1963.

Land use within the locality is ’primary production’ and is concerned with “agricultural production and the grazing of stock on relatively large holdings.”

Cavenagh is located within the federal division of Grey, the state electoral district of Stuart and the local government area of the District Council of Peterborough.
