= Margaret Allen (historian) =

Australian historian

- Born: Margaret Ellen Allen; 1947 (age 78–79); Adelaide, South Australia

Academic background
- Education: University of Adelaide (BA Hons) 1969, (MA) 1975; University of Essex (MA, Social History) 1979; Flinders University (PhD) 1992
- Thesis: Three South Australian Women Writers, 1854-1923: Matilda Evans, Catherine Spence and Catherine Martin (1992)

Academic work
- Discipline: Women's Studies, History
- Institutions: University of Adelaide

Margaret Allen (born 1947) is an Australian historian and women's studies researcher. She is professor emerita at the University of Adelaide.

== Early life and education ==
Margaret Ellen Allen was born in 1947 in Adelaide, the fourth child of George William Allen and Marjorie Ada Allen (née Knight). Her mother died suddenly in August 1948 and her father later married Helen Ladbury Allen (née Baylis).

Allen was a pupil at Walkerville Primary School and then went to Adelaide Girls High School from 1960 to 1964. She won a scholarship to study at the University of Adelaide, graduating in 1969 with a BA (hons) for her thesis on The Jews in the French Revolution.

== Career ==
Allen's academic career began at Salisbury Teachers College and from 1982 at the South Australian College of Advanced Education, following a restructure. At that point, concerned about staff losing their contracts, she became involved in union activities. She retired from this addition to her lecturing work in 1994. Following a further restructure of tertiary education in 1991 she joined the University of Adelaide where she was promoted associate professor in 2002 and full professor in 2007. In 1997 she was appointed the first head of the Department of Social Inquiry.

On her retirement in 2010 she was appointed professor emerita of the University of Adelaide. Colleagues organised a conference to celebrate her career in 2010 and the papers were published in the Australian Feminist Studies journal.

Allen is a member of the Australian Historical Association and the Australian Critical Race and Whiteness Studies Association. From 2005 to 2010 she was on the board of the International Federation for Research on Women's History and editor of its newsletter. She was a board member of the History Trust of South Australia from 2001 to 2007 and again from 2013 to 2016. She has been a member of the South Australian working party for the Australian Dictionary of Biography since 2005.

== Works ==
- Allen, Margaret (1996). What Katie might have learnt in Mount Gambia or some early influences on C.E.M. Martin. Universidad de Barcelona. Departament de Filología Anglesa i Alemanya. Barcelona, Spain: Departamento de Filologia Anglesa i Alemanya, Universitat de Barcelona. ISBN 978-84-477-0547-4.
- Allen, Margaret (2002). Catherine Martin's library: with a list of the books. Canberra: Mulini Press. ISBN 0-949910-94-5.
- Allen, Margaret; Dhawan, R. K., eds. (2007). Intersections: Gender, race, and ethnicity in Australasian studies. New Delhi: Prestige Books in collaboration with Association for the Study of Australasia in Asia. ISBN 978-81-7551-196-5.
- Haggis, Jane; Midgley, Clare; Allen, Margaret; Paisley, Fiona (2017). Cosmopolitan Lives on the Cusp of Empire: Interfaith, cross-cultural and transnational networks, 1860-1950. Cham, Switzerland: Palgrave Macmillan. ISBN 978-3-319-52748-2.

== Personal ==
In 1973 Allen married George Lewkowicz. They have two daughters.
