= Nackara, South Australia =

Nackara South Australia
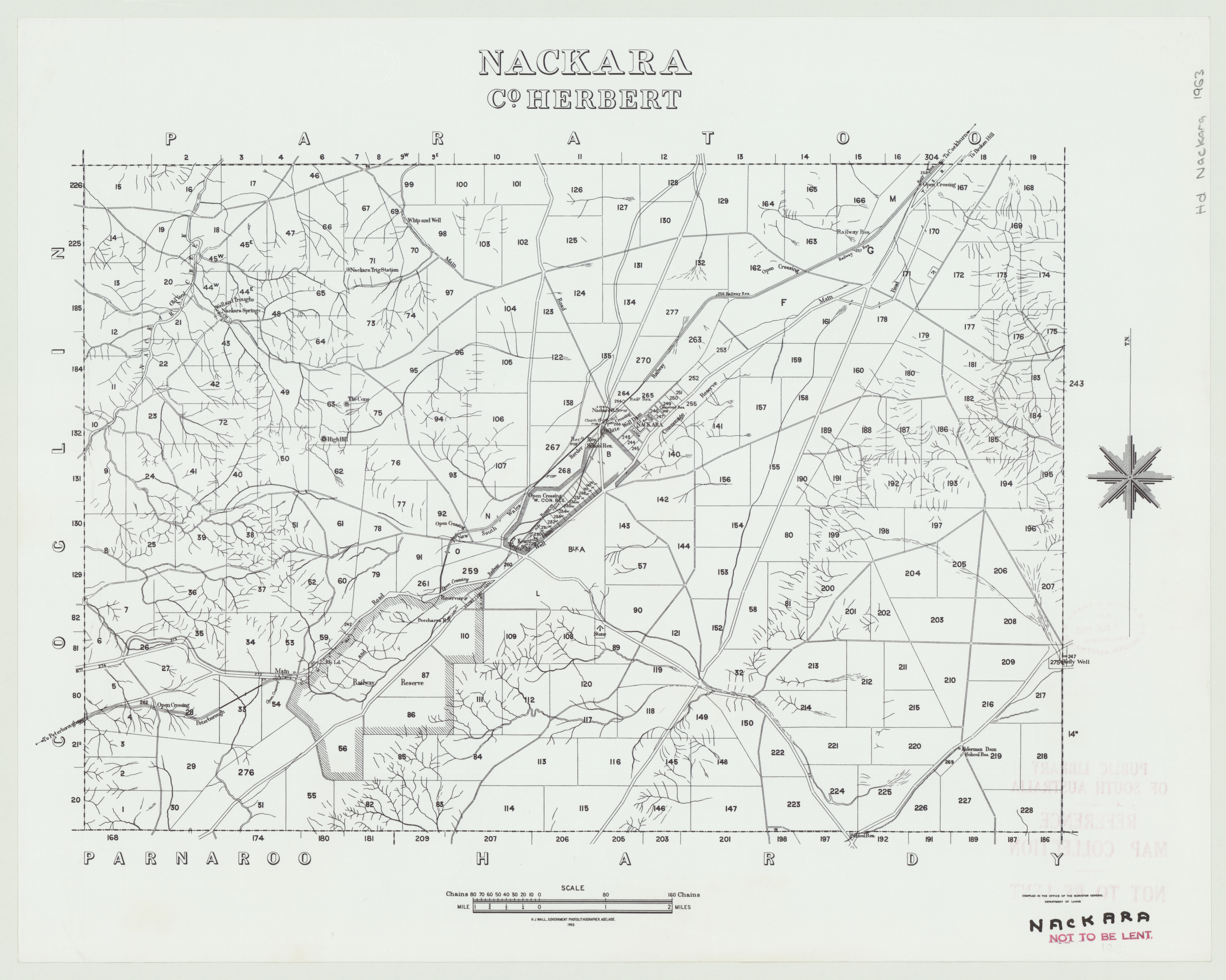
- Hundred of Nackara, 1963

- Coordinates: 32°48′07″S 139°14′38″E
- Population: 0 (SAL 2021)
- Postcode(s): 5440
- Time zone: ACST (UTC+9:30)
  - Summer (DST): ACDT (UTC+10:30)
- LGA(s): District Council of Peterborough
- Region: Yorke and Mid North
- County: Herbert
- State electorate(s): Stuart
- Federal division(s): Grey
Mean max temp	Mean min temp	Annual rainfall
24.6 °C; 76 °F	9.5 °C; 49 °F	207.9 mm 8.2 in
Localities around Nackara:
Cavenagh	Paratoo	Grampus
Dawson	Nackara	Grampus
Parnaroo	Parnaroo; Hardy	Warnes
- Footnotes: Adjoining localities

Nackara (formerly Tregu) is a locality and former farming town in South Australia, 47 kilometres east of Peterborough on the Barrier Highway. It was originally proclaimed as the Government Town of Tregu on 2 July 1891 but the name was changed to Nackara in 1940 to match the name of the railway station.

== History ==
The Nackara 'township' was created as a railway siding on the Peterborough (South Australia) to Broken Hill (New South Wales) train line which was completed in approximately 1888, mainly to transport the ore from the Broken Hill mines to the South Australian port(s).

The town was planned to have several streets with suburban style yards, however this never eventuated. The Nackara township never consisted of more than a few railway cottages, a town store/post office (part of a house), a community hall ('The Nackara Institute'), a Catholic church, a Presbyterian Church, a school, the railway platform, cattle yards and cemetery. The planned roads didn't ever eventuate, with only dirt tracks through the very dry paddocks.

The community consisted of families from the surrounding grazing land, and the railway workers. While the township never grew as planned, the community did have many social events such as picnics, town dances and concerts, annual horse races, and car races. The town also competed against the other local towns in at least rugby and cricket.

The local population were mainly immigrants (many Catholics from Ireland and several Polish families), and mainly worked as sheep and cattle graziers, railway workers, wood carters, shearers and labourers. There was a vibrant local Catholic community who had annual Catholic Picnics to raise money to erect a Catholic church. The church (St. Patrick's) was a small church built of stone on the top of the hill overlooking the Nackara township.

== Current ==
The area is too dry to support much livestock, so Nackara never grew beyond around 20 families and the township didn't develop. After the railway was realigned several kilometres to the south around the 1960s, the town practically died. There are only several graziers left in the area now.

Nackara School and the disused Nackara Institute (community hall) are all that remain standing within the Nackara township. The school is now a private residence. The (corrugated iron) Presbyterian church has gone, the Catholic Church was demolished (around the 1960s), the main store (home and post office) is now stone rubble with a chimney.
