= George Cavenagh =

Australian cricketer

Personal information
- Full name: George Cavenagh
- Born: 16 June 1836; Sydney, New South Wales, Australia
- Died: 23 November 1922 (aged 86); Albert Park, Melbourne, Victoria, Australia

Domestic team information
- Years: Team
- 1853-54: Victoria
- Only First-class: 3 March 1854 Victoria v Tasmania

Career statistics
Competition	First-class
Matches	1
Runs scored	45
Batting average	22.50
100s/50s	0/0
Top score	35
Balls bowled	76
Wickets	6
Bowling average	10.50
5 wickets in innings	1
10 wickets in match	0
Best bowling	5/46
Catches/stumpings	0/0
- Source: CricketArchive, 12 November 2011

George Cavenagh (16 June 1836 – 23 November 1922) was an Australian cricketer who played one first-class match for Victoria in 1854.

== Life and career ==
Cavenagh was born in Sydney, and his family moved to Melbourne in 1840 when his father, also George Cavenagh, founded the Port Phillip Herald. Young George worked for the Bank of Australasia for 44 years, managing the Portland branch from 1864 to 1877. He was secretary to the Associated Banks for 14 years.

An all-rounder, Cavenagh made a single first-class cricket appearance for Victoria, against Tasmania in March 1854. He was the highest scorer in the low-scoring match, making 35 and 10, and also took 5 for 46 and 1 for 17. Tasmania nevertheless won by eight wickets.

Cavenagh married Maria Loader Stodart in Melbourne in January 1862. He died in November 1922 at his home in the Melbourne suburb of Albert Park, aged 86. Four of his five children survived him. His wife had died in 1920.
