= Crystal Brook–Broken Hill railway line =

Railway line in Australia

Crystal Brook-Broken Hill railway line
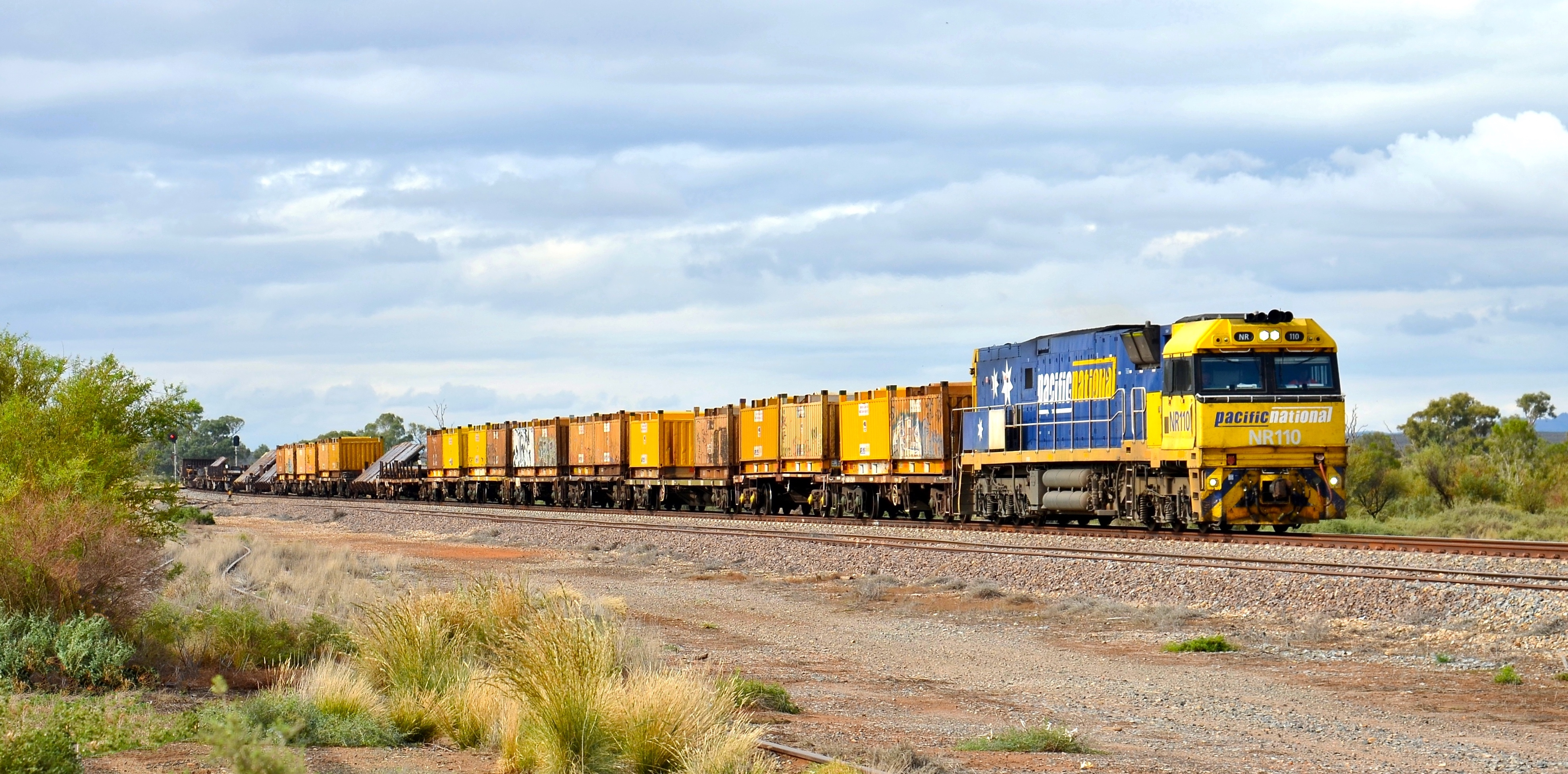
- A Pacific National steel train from Newcastle bound for Whyalla, passing through Yunta, between Broken Hill and Crystal Brook in 2017

Overview
- Owner: Australian Rail Track Corporation
- Termini: Crystal Brook; Broken Hill
- Continues from: Adelaide–Port Augusta line
- Continues as: NSW Broken Hill line

Service
- Operator(s): Aurizon; Great Southern Rail; Pacific National; SCT Logistics

History
- Opened: 1888
- Reopened: 1970 (standardised)

Technical
- Line length: 371 km (231 mi)
- Track gauge: 1,435 mm (4 ft 8 1/2 in) standard gauge
- Old gauge: 1,067 mm (3 ft 6 in)

The Crystal Brook–Broken Hill railway line is a 371 kilometre line running from Crystal Brook to Broken Hill on the Australian Rail Track Corporation network.

== History ==
In the 1875, the South Australian Railways built a narrow gauge line from Port Pirie to Gladstone. This was extended to Cockburn in 1888, where it joined with the Silverton Tramway.

In April 1963, the federal government decided to replace the narrow gauge line with a new standard gauge line to create an East-West rail corridor from Sydney to Perth. The new line opened in January 1970. Parts of the new line are on a different alignment than the old narrow gauge route. For example, the new line bypasses the town of Oodla Wirra, and followed a new alignment rather than the route of the Silverton Tramway.

In 1982, the Adelaide to Port Augusta line was converted to standard gauge. As part of this the junction with the Port Pirie to Broken Hill line was moved 24 kilometres east to Crystal Brook.

The 371 kilometre line is single track throughout with 13 crossing loops.

== Services ==
The main traffic on the line is interstate freight trains operating between Sydney, Parkes, Adelaide and Perth with the majority operated by Pacific National and SCT Logistics. Genesee & Wyoming Australia operate intrastate services.

The only passenger service is Journey Beyond's Indian Pacific. In the 1980s, the line was briefly served by The Alice and Australian National's Adelaide to Broken Hill service.
