= Yunta, South Australia =

Yunta
- Town
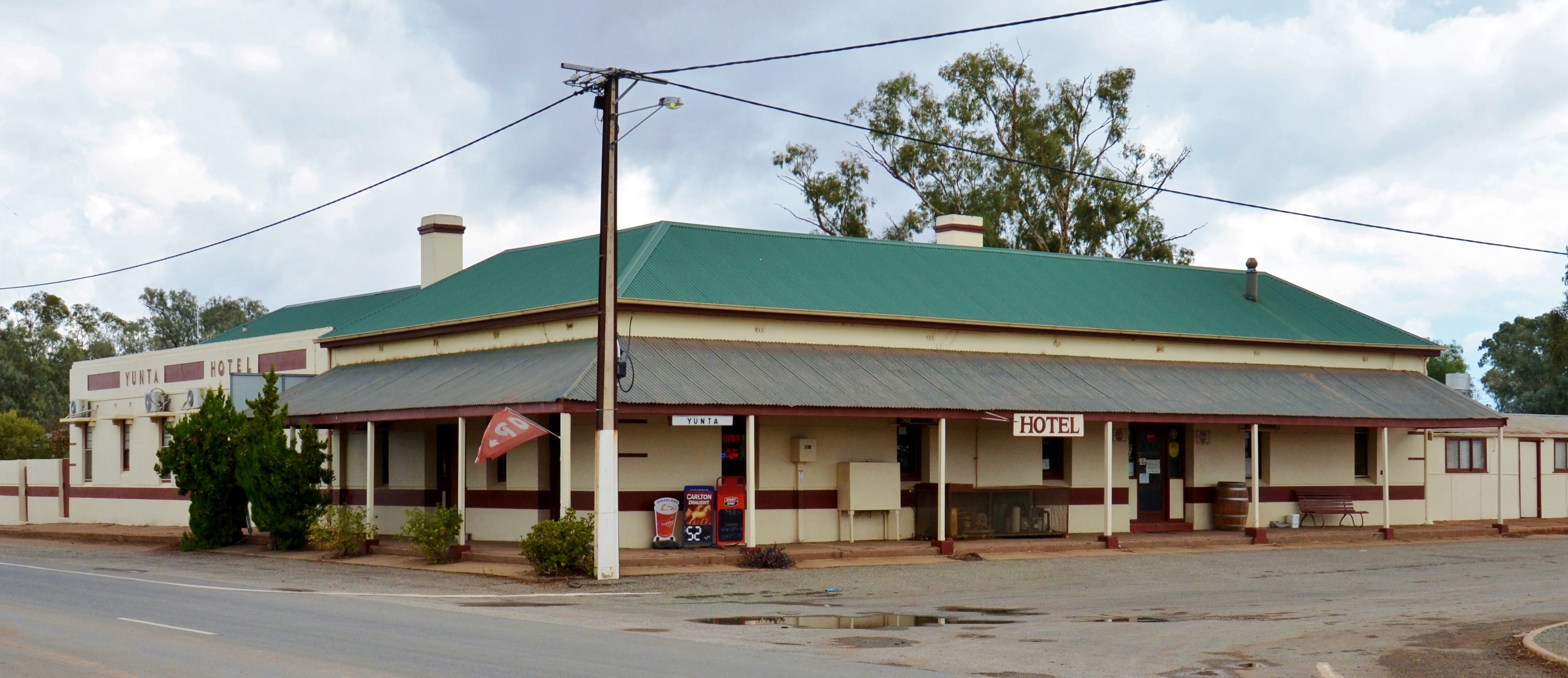
- Yunta Hotel, 2017

- Coordinates: 32°34′55″S 139°33′41″E
- Country: Australia
- State: South Australia
- Region: Far North
- LGA: Pastoral Unincorporated Area
- Location: 275 km (171 mi) NE of Adelaide; 81 km (50 mi) NE of Peterborough; 150 km (93 mi) SW of Cockburn
- Established: 13 January 1887 (town); 23 October 2003 (locality)

Government
  - State electorate: Stuart
  - Federal division: Grey
- Elevation: 302 m (991 ft)

Population
  - Total: 60 (SAL 2021)
- Time zone: UTC+9:30 (ACST)
  - Summer (DST): UTC+10:30 (ACDT)
- Postcode: 5440
- County: Herbert
- Mean max temp: 24.7 °C (76.5 °F)
- Mean min temp: 9.5 °C (49.1 °F)
- Annual rainfall: 202.5 mm (7.97 in)
Localities around Yunta
Melton Station	Melton Station; Winnininnie	Winnininnie
Waroonee; Paratoo	Yunta	Winnininnie; Oulnina Park; Netley Gap
Paratoo	Grampus; Manunda Station	Netley Gap
- Locations; Adjoining localities

Yunta is a town and locality in the Australian state of South Australia located about 275 kilometres (171 mi) north-east of the state capital of Adelaide. It is a service centre, supporting both the local area and travellers passing through on the Barrier Highway. It is south-west of Broken Hill and north-east of Peterborough.

== History ==
An early spelling of the town was Yanta. In 1866 the district was known as part of the Tattawappa and Yanta Run.

Yunta township was established in 1887 after the discovery of gold at the nearby diggings at Teetulpa and Waukaringa, when more than 5000 miners made their way through here. From the early 1890s the village was a small but busy railway town on the 1067 mm (3 ft 6 in) narrow-gauge line between Cockburn and Port Augusta (Cockburn being the town on the state border to which trains from Broken Hill, New South Wales brought silver-lead-zinc ore concentrates).

From 1934, Yunta was the base for the famed outback trucking and mail contractor Henry Edgar (Harry) Ding.

Today Yunta is a small service centre for travellers and the surrounding properties. Yunta also provides an alternative route to the Flinders Ranges and beyond. The natural gas fields at Gidgealpa and Moomba have resulted in improved access roads to South Australia's arid north-east region.

== Facilities ==
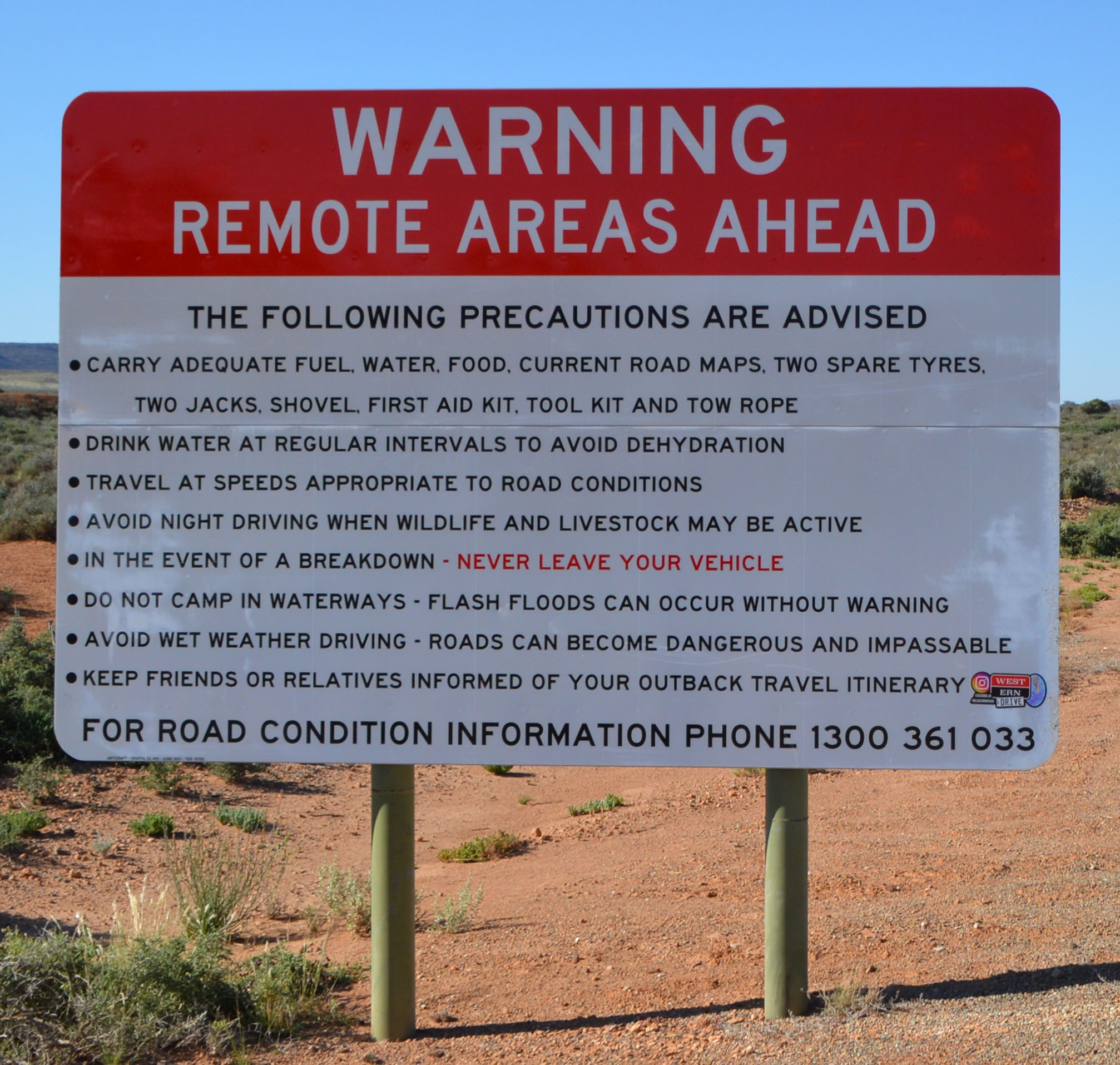
Warning sign at the start of Tea Tree Road to Arkaroola

Village facilities include a hotel offering meals and accommodation, two roadhouses (one with caravan sites), two fuel stations, post office, Rural Transaction Centre offering internet access, police station, air strip and a primary school. Opposite the hotel there is a rest area with public toilets which can be used for free (donation) overnight stays.

The main annual event is the Yunta Picnic Races and gymkhana held in May.

== Governance ==
Yunta is located within the federal division of Grey, the state electoral district of Stuart and the Pastoral Unincorporated Area of South Australia. As of 2018, the community within Yunta received municipal services from a South Australian government agency, the Outback Communities Authority.

== Climate ==
Yunta has a cool arid climate (Köppen BWk) bordering upon a hot arid climate (BWh), featuring hot, usually dry summers, and pleasant, dry winters with cold mornings.

Climate data for Yunta Airstrip, elevation 300 m (980 ft), (1998–2025 normals and extremes)
Month	Jan	Feb	Mar	Apr	May	Jun	Jul	Aug	Sep	Oct	Nov	Dec	Year
Record high °C (°F)	46.0 (114.8)	45.5 (113.9)	41.7 (107.1)	37.6 (99.7)	29.1 (84.4)	26.0 (78.8)	25.4 (77.7)	28.7 (83.7)	35.7 (96.3)	39.0 (102.2)	44.6 (112.3)	45.9 (114.6)	46.0 (114.8)
Mean daily maximum °C (°F)	33.9 (93.0)	32.4 (90.3)	29.0 (84.2)	24.5 (76.1)	19.3 (66.7)	15.9 (60.6)	15.7 (60.3)	17.8 (64.0)	22.0 (71.6)	25.2 (77.4)	28.5 (83.3)	31.3 (88.3)	24.6 (76.3)
Mean daily minimum °C (°F)	16.7 (62.1)	15.7 (60.3)	13.0 (55.4)	9.1 (48.4)	5.6 (42.1)	3.7 (38.7)	3.1 (37.6)	4.1 (39.4)	6.6 (43.9)	9.4 (48.9)	12.5 (54.5)	14.6 (58.3)	9.5 (49.1)
Record low °C (°F)	6.0 (42.8)	6.7 (44.1)	2.4 (36.3)	−3.0 (26.6)	−5.9 (21.4)	−7.1 (19.2)	−7.5 (18.5)	−6.6 (20.1)	−3.3 (26.1)	−0.3 (31.5)	1.5 (34.7)	5.1 (41.2)	−7.5 (18.5)
Average precipitation mm (inches)	22.4 (0.88)	17.0 (0.67)	12.8 (0.50)	11.8 (0.46)	10.9 (0.43)	16.3 (0.64)	13.4 (0.53)	12.7 (0.50)	16.6 (0.65)	23.3 (0.92)	30.9 (1.22)	16.4 (0.65)	205.3 (8.08)
Average precipitation days (≥ 0.2 mm)	3.7	2.4	4.0	3.6	5.1	7.9	7.2	6.6	5.1	4.9	5.6	4.6	60.7
Average afternoon relative humidity (%)	21	26	28	32	42	50	48	39	33	27	27	24	33
Source: Australian Bureau of Meteorology (humidity 1991–2010)

== See also ==
- Disappearance of Gus Lamont, four-year-old child missing since 27 September 2025.
