= District Council of Peterborough =

Coordinates: 32°58′25″S 138°50′17″E

- Local government area
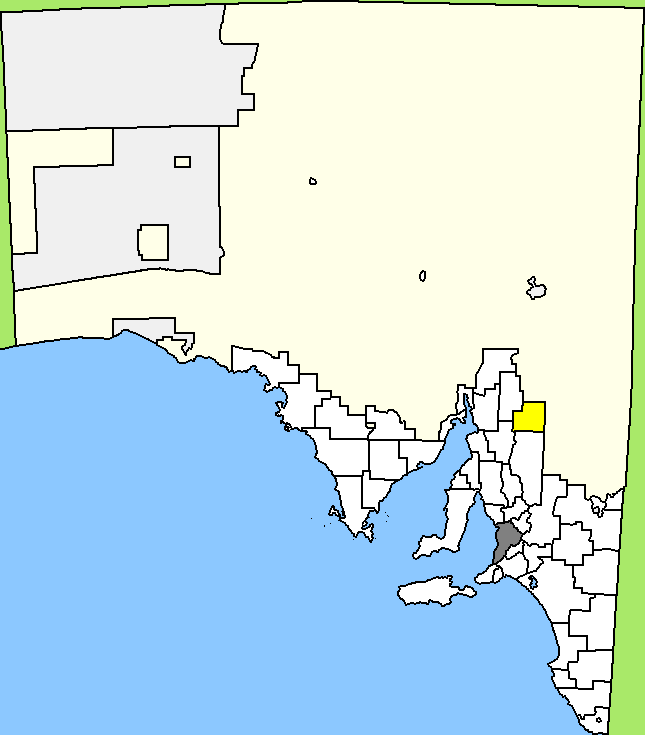
- Location of District Council of Peterborough
- Interactive map of District Council of Peterborough
- Country: Australia
- State: South Australia
- Region: Yorke and Mid North
- Established: 1935
- Council seat: Peterborough

Government
  - Mayor: Ruth Whittle
  - State electorate: Stuart
  - Federal division: Grey

Area
  - Total: 3,020 km^{2} (1,170 sq mi)

Population
  - Total: 1,638 (LGA 2021)
- Website: District Council of Peterborough
LGAs around District Council of Peterborough
Orroroo Carrieton	Outback Communities	Outback Communities
Orroroo Carrieton	Peterborough	Outback Communities
Northern Areas	Goyder	Outback Communities

The District Council of Peterborough is a local government area in the Yorke and Mid North region of South Australia. The principal town and council seat is Peterborough; it also includes the localities of Cavenagh, Dawson, Hardy, Minvalara, Nackara, Oodla Wirra, Paratoo, Parnaroo, Sunnybrae, Ucolta and Yongala.

It was formed on 21 March 1935, when the District Council of Coglin and the District Council of Yongala merged with part of the Corporate Town of Peterborough to create the new council. The remainder of the Corporate Town of Peterborough continued on as an independent municipality surrounded by the District Council until the two were amalgamated in 1997. It still operates out of the heritage-listed 1927 Peterborough Town Hall.

== Council ==
Ward	Councillor	Notes
Mayor	Ruth Whittle	
Unsubdivided	Michael Burford	
Unsubdivided	Cassandra Chambers	
Unsubdivided	Leon Clapp	
Unsubdivided	Leanne Draper	
Unsubdivided	Frank Hardbottle	Deputy Mayor
Unsubdivided	Graham Mercer	
Unsubdivided	Scott Mesecke	
Unsubdivided	Kim Miller	

The District Council of Peterborough has a directly elected mayor.

== Mayors and Chairmen of the District Council of Peterborough ==
- Ernest Dewar Sawers (1935–1939)
- Thomas Edward Richards (1939-1941)
- Harold Davies (1941-1950)
- Hubert William Lang (1950-1951)
- Leslie Allan McPherson (1951-1954)
- Maxwell Edward Hams (1954–1966)
- Woodrow Eric Douglas Chapman (1966–1967)
- Ronald Naish Bailey (1967-after 1985)
- Ruth Whittle (1991–present)

== See also ==
- List of parks and gardens in rural South Australia
