= Thangkaali =

Indigenous Australian people

The Thangkaali (Danggali) are an indigenous Australian people of the state of South Australia.

== Language ==
Edward John Eyre states in his exploration journals that the Thangkaali language was called Yakkumban.

== Country ==
According to Norman Tindale, the Danggali tribal lands extended over roughly 9,800 square miles (25,000 km^{2}). They roamed the arid mallee west of the Darling River, and the plains to the southwest of Broken Hill, running from the vicinity of Tandou Lake in a southwestern direction as far as Mount Bryan and Burra Creek. Their northwestern extension reached beyond Morgan.

Their northern neighbours were the Malyangapa. (Note: "The tribes which bound the Milya-uppa are the Ngurunta on the west, the Momba on the south, those of the Paroo, on the east, and the Karenggapa on the north." (Reid 1886, p. 180))

== Lifestyle ==
Much of the terrain was waterless and they drew their supplies from red mallee and Hakea roots. Their wurlies were built low from mallee branches thatched over with spinifex. When brought in to areas of white settlement, where water supplies were ample, they showed no interest in hunting for or eating rabbit, but were partial to cats, and would sift out ants' eggs with a coolamon to then roast them on ashes. They bore no signs of scarification.

== History ==
According to Tindale, the early explorer Edward John Eyre's account of the Paritke tribe during his travels over 1840-1841 refer to the Danggali people.

In 1863, a report from Yelta, mentioned an encounter that occurred between part of the lower Darling River and South Australian border with a woman and her two sons whom the writer regarded as a breakaway family formed by a man, Nanja, who fled from a Maraura clan with whom he had kin links, (Note: Richards (1903) argued that Nanja was a Maraura. Tindale in 1974 concluded that the evidence suggested he was actually a Danggali. (Tindale 1974, p. 211)) and took refuge in Danggali territory. A second encounter took place in 1884, at Dinner Creek on the road from Oak Vale to Popiltah Lake. Several years later, around 1891-1892, a Maraura met up with a group of thirty odd blacks calling itself Nanja and they were drawn in to Avoca Station, and set up camp at Urntah, where they were known as the Scotia blacks. An account of this tribe was given by C. Richards in 1901, who called them Dthang'gha, referring to them as an upland people west of the Darling River. Two other clans, respectively, the Nanjara and the Njuwiki were known to camp on Njuwiki Creek around the turn of the 19-20th centuries, but when that waterhole dried out under a severe drought, the Nanjara people were aided by police who guided them to a site near Mount Bryan, where that clan died out, from, it is said, heartbrokenness. The Njuwiki shifted back to the Murray River area.

== Social organization ==
The Danggali were divided into at least 4 hordes.

- Momba (at Momba)
- Nanja
- Nanjara
- Nju:wiki

== Customs ==
If Eyre's Paritke are the Danggali, then this is how he describes their dancing.

The "Paritke".. have quite a different form of dancing from the river natives. They are painted or decorated with feathers in a similar way; but each dancer ties bunches of green boughs round the leg, above the knees, whilst the mode of dancing consists in stamping with the foot and uttering at each motion a deep ventral intonation, the boughs round the knees making a loud rustling noise in keeping with the time of the music. One person, who directs the others in the movements of this dance, holds in his hands an instrument in the form of a diamond, made of two slight sticks, from two and a half to three feet long, crossed and tied in the middle, round this a string, made of the hair of the opposum, is pressed from corner to corner, and continued successively towards the centre until there is only room left for the hand to hold the instrument. At each corner is appended a bunch of cockatoo feathers. With this the chief performer keeps a little in advance of the dancers, and whisking it up and down to the time of the music, regulates their movements. In another dance, in which women are the chief performers, their bodies are painted with white streaks, and their hair adorned with cockatoo feathers. They carry large sticks in their hands, and place themselves in a row in front, whilst the men with their spears stand in a line behind them. They then all commence their movements, but without intermingling, the males and females dancing by themselves. There is little variety or life in this dance, yet it seems to be a favourite one with the natives. The women have occasionally another mode of dancing, by joining the hands together over the head, closing the feet, and bringing the knees into contact. The legs are then thrown outwards from the knee, whilst the feet and hands are kept in their original position, and being drawn quickly in again a sharp sound is produced by the collision. This is either practised alone by young girls, or by several together for their own amusement. It is adopted also when a single woman is placed in front of a row of male dancers to excite their passions; for many of the native dances are of a grossly licentious character. In another figure they keep the feet close together, without lifting them from the ground, and by a peculiar motion of the limbs advance onwards, describing a short semicircle. This amusement is almost exclusively confined to young females among themselves.

== Alternative names ==
- Dthang-gaa-lee
- Dthang'gka ('upland'), Dthang'gha
- Jakojako, Jokajoka, Yokka Yokka, Yaak-yakko
- Momba (toponym)
- Nanja
- Nanjara
- Nganya ("Scotia blacks")
- Nju:wiki
- Nonnia
- Paritke, Paridke
- Tungarlee, Tung-arlee
- Yakayok
- Yakkumbata
- Yakumban

Source: Tindale 1974, p. 211

== Sources ==
- "Aboriginal South Australia". Government of South Australia. Archived from the original on 1 May 2013.
- "AIATSIS map of Indigenous Australia". AIATSIS.
- Bonney, Frederic (1884). "On Some Customs of the Aborigines of the River Darling, New South Wales". Journal of the Anthropological Institute of Great Britain and Ireland. 13. Sydney: 122–137. doi:10.2307/2841717. JSTOR 2841717.
- Cudmore, A. F. (1893–1894). Wild tribe of natives near Popiltah, Wentworth, N. S. W. Vol. 5. Sydney: Australian and New Zealand Association for the Advancement of Science. pp. 524–526.
- Eyre, Edward John (1845). Journals of expeditions of discovery into central Australia, and overland from Adelaide to King George's Sound, in the years 1840-1; sent by the colonists of South Australia, with the sanction and support of the government: including an account of the manners and customs of the aborigines and the state of their relations with Europeans (PDF). London: T. and W. Boone.
- Howitt, Alfred William (1904). The native tribes of south-east Australia (PDF). London: Macmillan.
- Mathews, R. H. (1898). "Group divisions and initiation ceremonies of the Barkungee tribes". Journal of the Proceedings of the Royal Society of New South Wales. 32: 241–255. doi:10.5962/p.359301. S2CID 259756893.
- Reid, James A. (1886). "Torrowotto" (PDF). In Curr, Edward Micklethwaite (ed.). The Australian race: its origin, languages, customs, place of landing in Australia and the routes by which it spread itself over the continent. Vol. 2. Melbourne: J. Ferres. pp. 178–181.
- Richards, C. (1903). "The Marraa' Warree' tribes or nation and their language". Science of Man. 6. Sydney: 119–126, 163–169.
- Tindale, Norman Barnett (1974). "Danggali(SA)". Aboriginal Tribes of Australia: Their Terrain, Environmental Controls, Distribution, Limits, and Proper Names. Australian National University Press. ISBN 978-0-708-10741-6.
