= 2025 Australian House of Representatives election =

2025 Australian federal election (House of Representatives)
- 3 May 2025
- All 150 seats in the Australian House of Representatives; 76 seats needed for a majority
- Turnout: 90.70%
Party	Leader	Vote %	Seats	+/–
Labor	Anthony Albanese	34.56%	94	+17
Coalition	Peter Dutton	31.82%	43	−15
Greens	Adam Bandt	12.20%	1	−3
Katter's Australian	Robbie Katter (Note: Robbie Katter is the party leader but serves as the member for Traeger in the Queensland Legislative Assembly and did not contest the federal election.)	0.33%	1	0
Centre Alliance	No leader	0.24%	1	0
Independents	N/A	7.27%	10	0
This lists parties that won seats. See the complete results below.

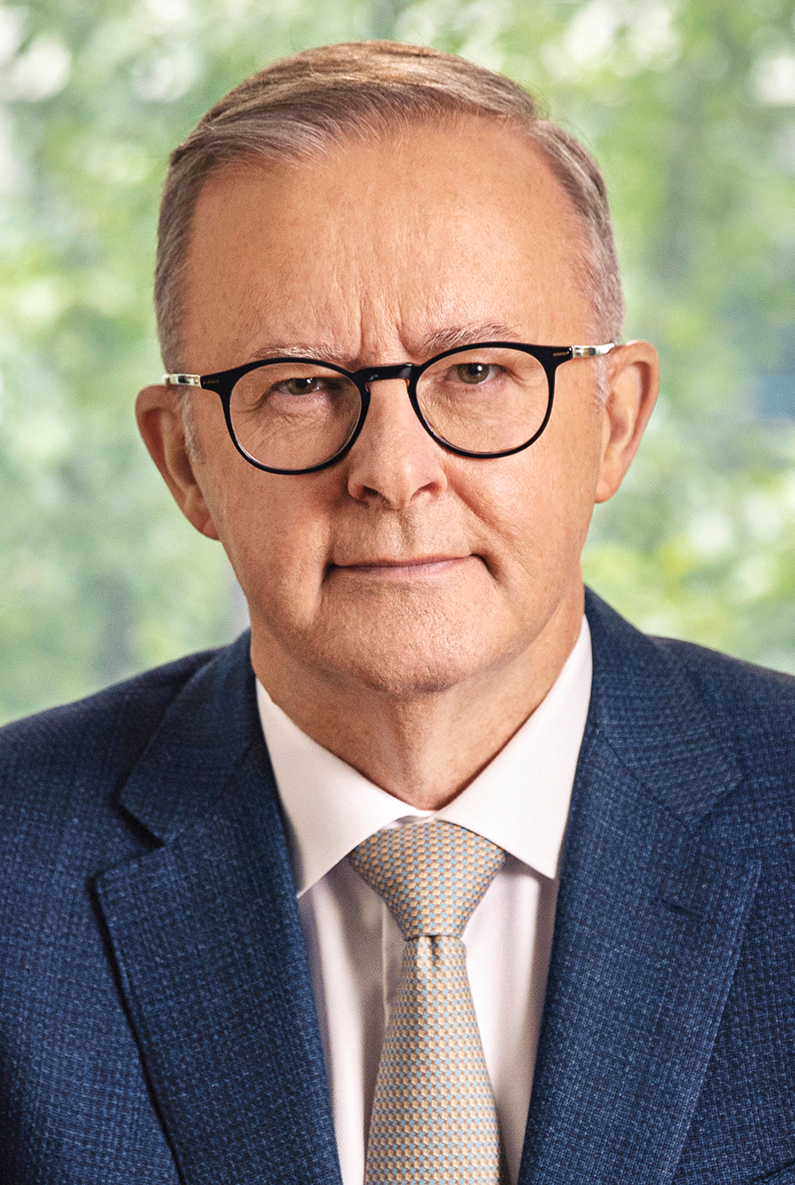

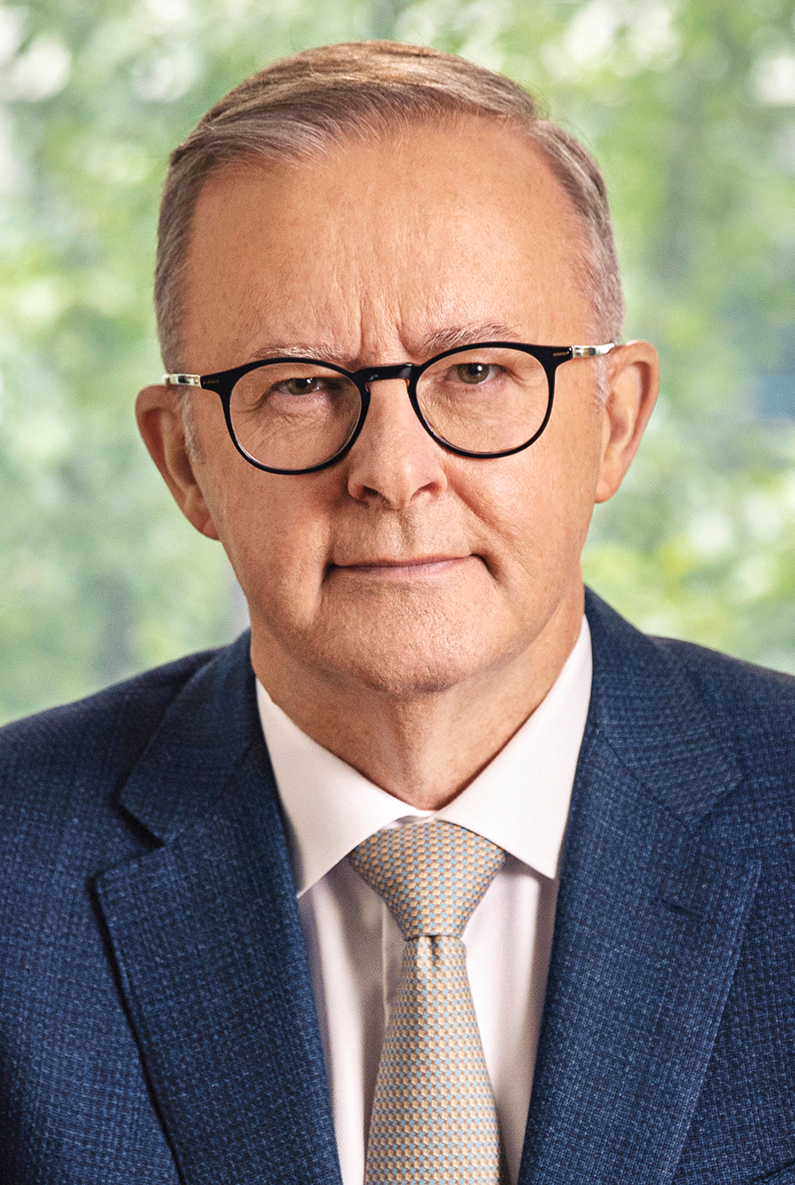
Prime Minister before	Prime Minister after
Anthony Albanese; Labor	Anthony Albanese; Labor

The number of seats won by each party in the Australian House of Representatives at the 2025 federal election were: Labor 94, Coalition 43, Greens 1, Centre Alliance 1, Katter's Australian Party 1, and Independents 10.

This election was held using instant-runoff voting.

== Australia ==
Government (94) Labor (94) Opposition (43) Liberal–National Coalition: Liberal (28) (Note: 10 members of the Liberal National Party of Queensland sit in the Liberal party room and 6 in the National party room) National (15) Crossbench (13) Independent (10) Greens (1) Centre Alliance (1) Katter's Australian (1)

House of Representatives (IRV) – Turnout 90.70% (CV)
Party	Primary Vote			Seats	
Party	Votes	%	Swing (pp)	Seats	Change
Labor	5,354,138	34.56	+1.98	94	▲17
Liberal–National Coalition	4,929,402	31.82	−3.88	43	▼15
Liberal	3,205,216	20.69	−3.20	18	▼9
Liberal National (Qld)	1,099,623	7.10	−0.90	16	▼5
National	588,778	3.80	+0.20	9	▼1
Country Liberal (NT)	35,785	0.23	+0.03	0	Steady
Greens	1,889,977	12.20	−0.05	1	▼3
One Nation	991,814	6.40	+1.44	0	Steady
Trumpet of Patriots	296,076	1.91	+1.52 (Note: Compared to Australian Federation Party results at the 2022 federal election. The party's campaign was funded by and strongly associated with Clive Palmer at this election - the result is a -2.21% swing compared to the 2022 result of Palmer's since deregistered United Australia Party.)	0	Steady
Family First	273,681	1.77	+1.77 (Note: New party)	0	Steady
Legalise Cannabis	186,335	1.20	+1.16	0	Steady
Libertarian	83,474	0.54	−1.19 (Note: Compared to Liberal Democratic Party results at the 2022 federal election.)	0	Steady
People First	71,892	0.46	+0.46	0	Steady
Katter's Australian	51,775	0.33	−0.05	1	Steady
Centre Alliance	37,453	0.24	−0.01	1	Steady
Animal Justice	35,312	0.23	−0.37	0	Steady
Christians	31,365	0.20	+0.06	0	Steady
Shooters, Fishers, Farmers	26,968	0.17	+0.04	0	Steady
Victorian Socialists	23,652	0.15	−0.04	0	Steady
Citizens	20,770	0.13	+0.10	0	Steady
Socialist Alliance	18,653	0.12	+0.04	0	Steady
FUSION	14,374	0.09	+0.00	0	Steady
Indigenous-Aboriginal	6,306	0.04	−0.01	0	Steady
HEART	5,138	0.03	−0.15	0	Steady
Great Australian	1,509	0.01	−0.20	0	Steady
Democrats	688	0.00	+0.00	0	Steady
Independents	1,126,051	7.27	+1.98	10	Steady
Not affiliated	13,433	0.09	+0.08	0	Steady
Total	15,490,236			150	▼1
Two-party-preferred vote
Labor	8,553,231	55.22	+3.09		
Liberal–National Coalition	6,937,005	44.78	−3.09		
Informal votes	919,512	5.60	+0.41		
Turnout	16,409,748	90.70	+0.88		
Registered voters	18,091,591	–	–		
Source: AEC, ABC

Primary vote
Labor	34.56%
Coalition	31.82%
Greens	12.20%
Independents	7.27%
One Nation	6.40%
Trumpet of Patriots	1.91%
Others	5.84%

Two-party preferred vote
Labor	55.22%
Coalition	44.78%

Seats
Labor	62.67%
Coalition	28.67%
Independents	6.67%
Greens	0.67%
Katter's Australian	0.67%
Centre Alliance	0.67%

== States ==
=== New South Wales ===
2025 Australian federal election (New South Wales)
- 3 May 2025

All 46 New South Wales seats in the House of Representatives and 6 of the 12 seats in the Senate
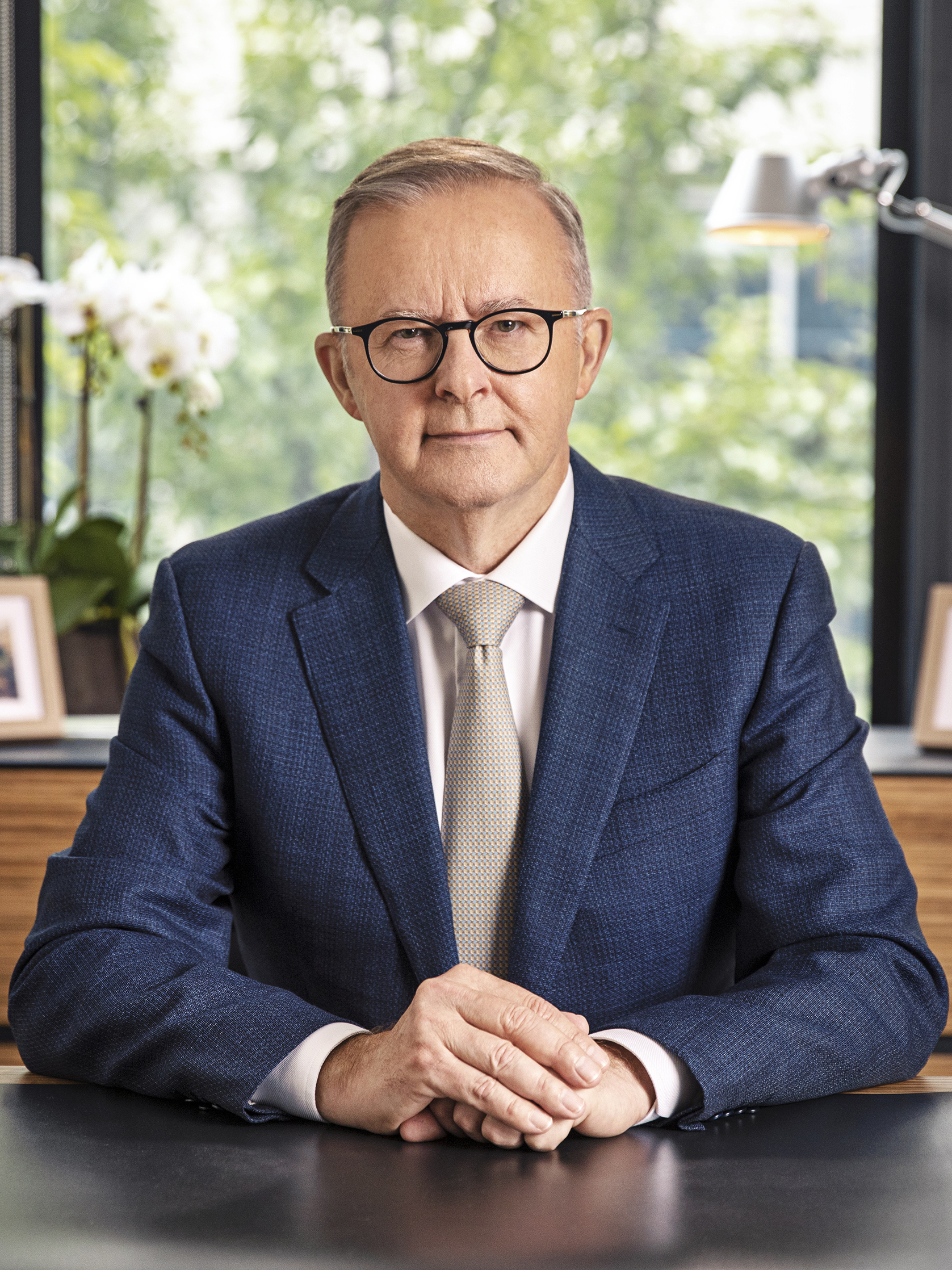

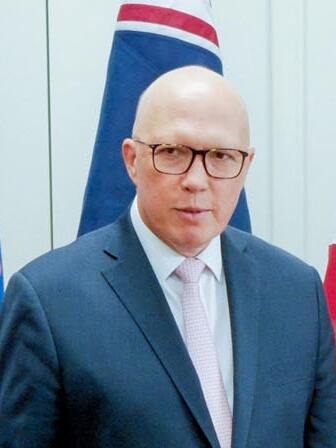
	First party	Second party	Third party
			IND
Leader	Anthony Albanese	Peter Dutton	N/A
Party	Labor	Coalition	Independents
Last election	26 seats	16 seats	5 seats
Seats won	28	12	6
Seat change	▲2	▼4	▲1
Primary vote	1,686,994	1,511,236	465,188
Percentage	35.20%	31.53%	9.71%
Swing	▲1.82	▼5.01	▲2.15
TPP	55.27%	44.73%
TPP swing	▲3.85	▼3.85
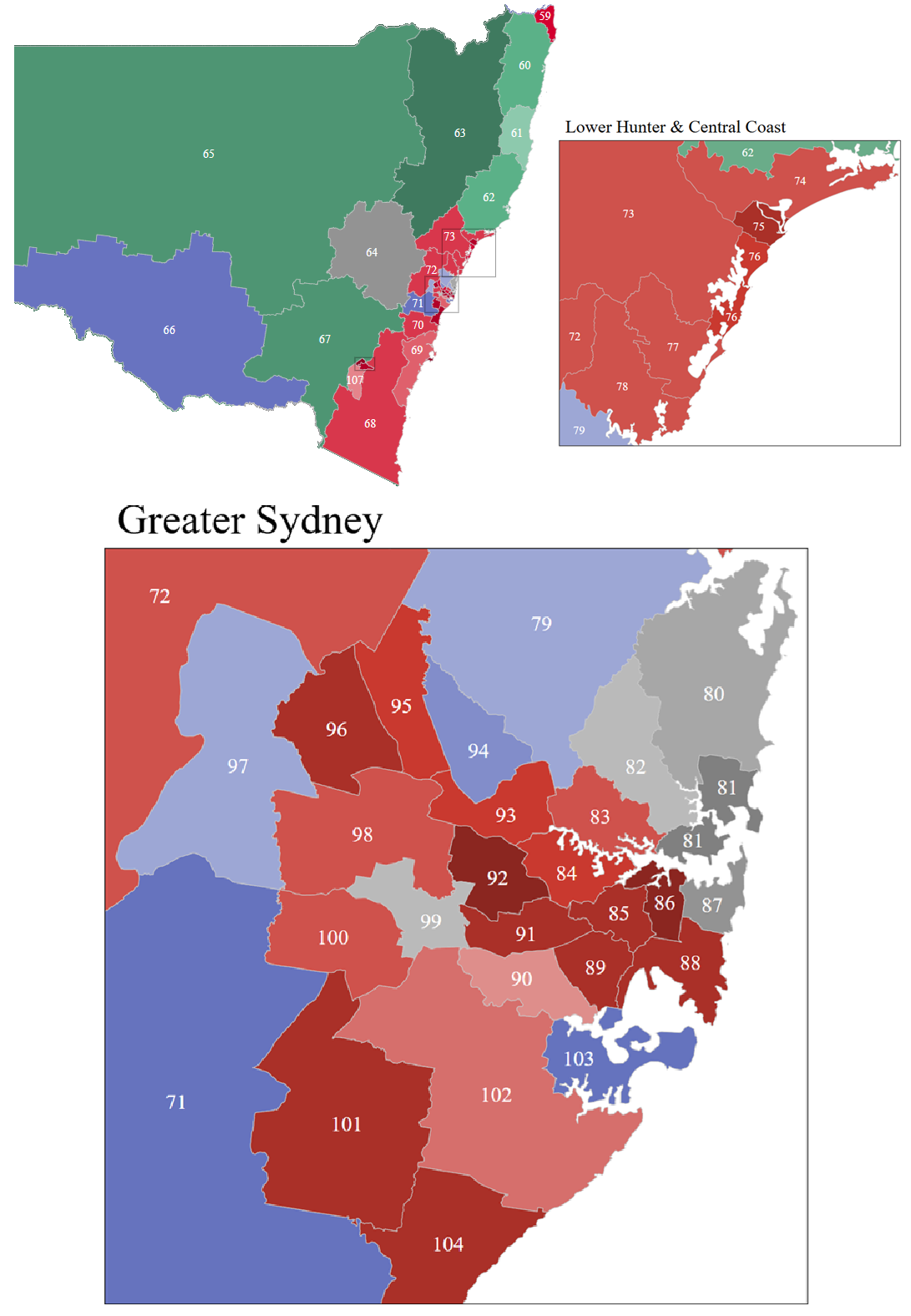

House of Representatives (IRV) – Turnout 91.58% (CV)
Party	Primary Vote			Seats	
Party	No.	%	Swing (pp)	No.	Change
Labor	1,686,994	35.20	+1.82	28	▲2
Liberal–National Coalition	1,511,236	31.53	−5.01	12	▼4
Liberal	1,160,759	24.22	−4.08	6	▼3
Nationals	350,477	7.31	−0.93	6	▼1
Greens	530,302	11.06	+1.04	0	Steady
One Nation	288,676	6.02	+1.18	0	Steady
Trumpet of Patriots	87,846	1.83	+1.77	0	Steady
Family First	63,818	1.33	+1.33	0	Steady
Libertarian	52,124	1.09	−1.00	0	Steady
Legalise Cannabis	44,764	0.93	+0.93	0	Steady
Shooters, Fishers, Farmers	23,511	0.49	+0.17	0	Steady
Animal Justice	10,062	0.21	−0.16	0	Steady
Citizens	6,253	0.13	+0.08	0	Steady
People First	5,442	0.11	+0.11	0	Steady
Fusion	4,394	0.09	−0.09	0	Steady
Socialist Alliance	4,032	0.08	+0.05	0	Steady
HEART	3,916	0.08	−0.22	0	Steady
Indigenous-Aboriginal	3,117	0.07	−0.09	0	Steady
Democrats	688	0.01	+0.00	0	Steady
Independent	465,188	9.71	+2.15	6	▲1
Not affiliated	888	0.02	−0.00	0	Steady
Total	4,793,251	100.00	–	46	▼1
Informal	420,008	8.06	+1.84	–	–
Turnout	5,213,259	91.58	+0.88	–	–
Registered voters	5,692,270	–	–	–	–
Two-party-preferred vote
Labor	2,649,390	55.27	+3.85		
Liberal–National Coalition	2,143,861	44.73	−3.85		
Source: AEC

Liberal to Labor: Banks, Bennelong, (Note: Bennelong was notionally Liberal prior to the election) Hughes
Liberal to Independent: Bradfield

=== Victoria ===
2025 Australian federal election (Victoria)
- 3 May 2025

All 38 Victorian seats in the Australian House of Representatives and 6 seats in the Australian Senate
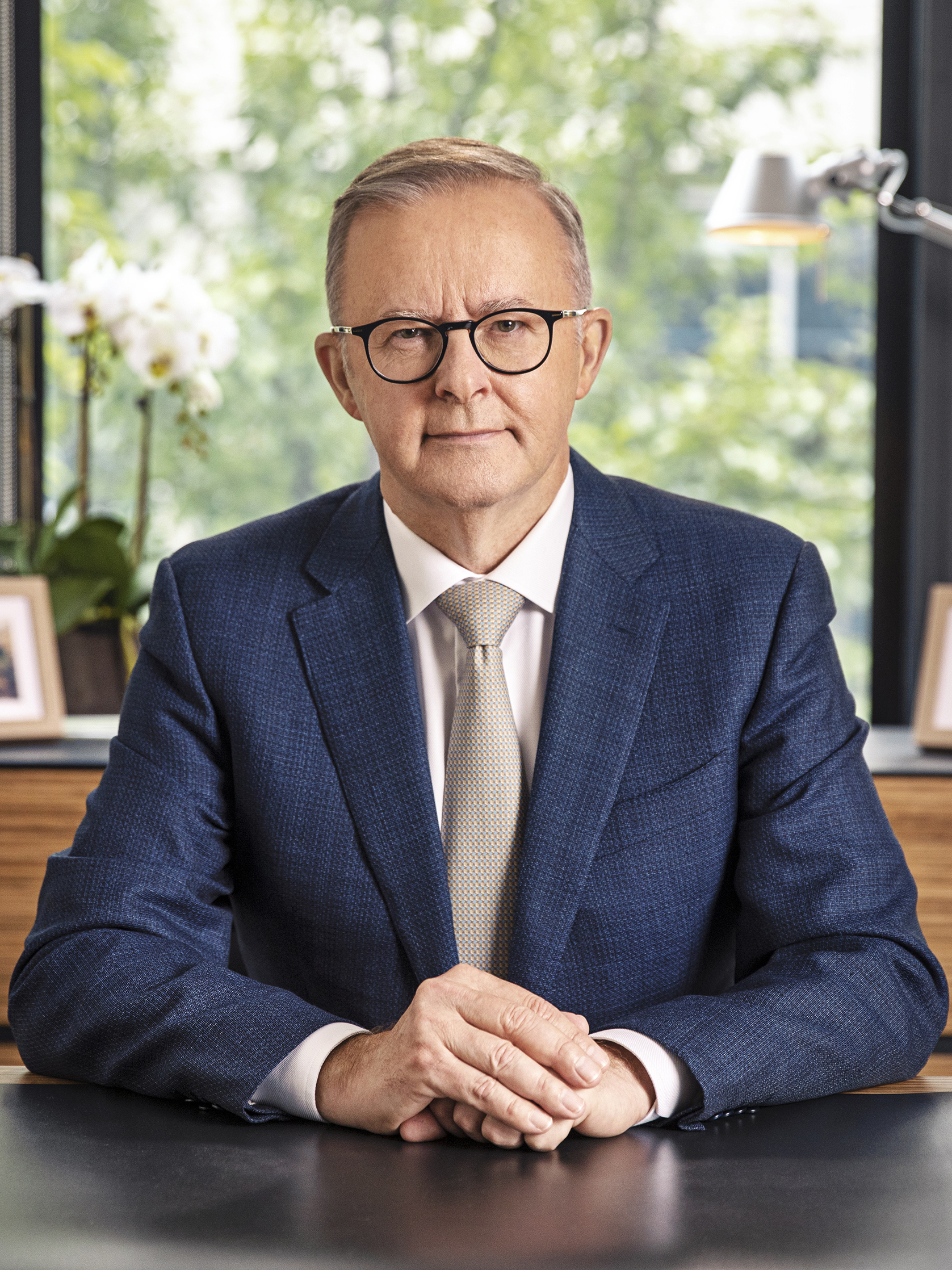

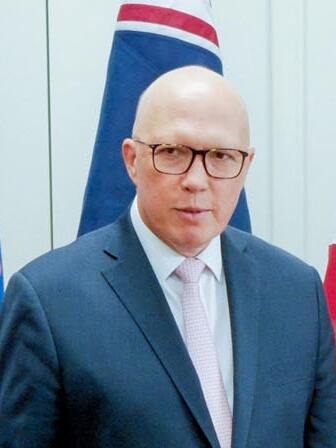

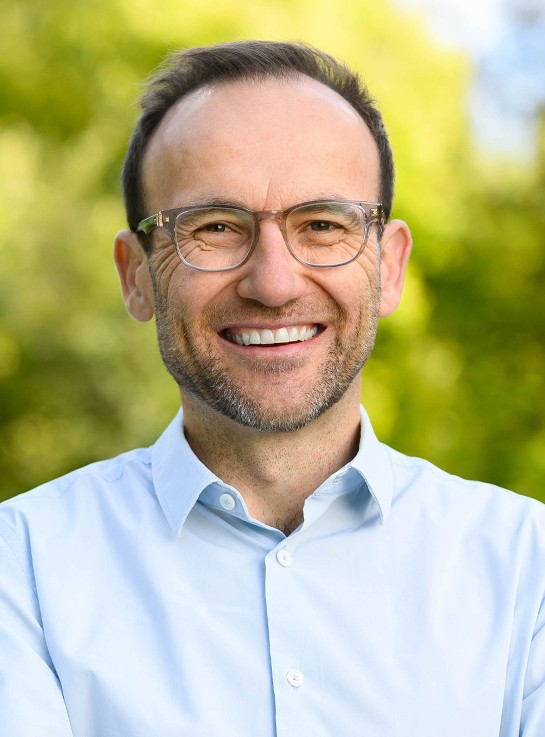
	First party	Second party	Third party
Leader	Anthony Albanese	Peter Dutton	Adam Bandt
Party	Labor	Coalition	Greens
Last election	24 seats	11 seats	1 seat
Seats won	27	9	0
Seat change	▲3	▼2	▼1
Popular vote	1,375,995	1,304,933	550,659
Percentage	33.95%	32.20%	13.59%
Swing	▲1.10	▼0.88	▼0.15
TPP	56.35%	43.65%
TPP swing	▲1.52	▼1.52
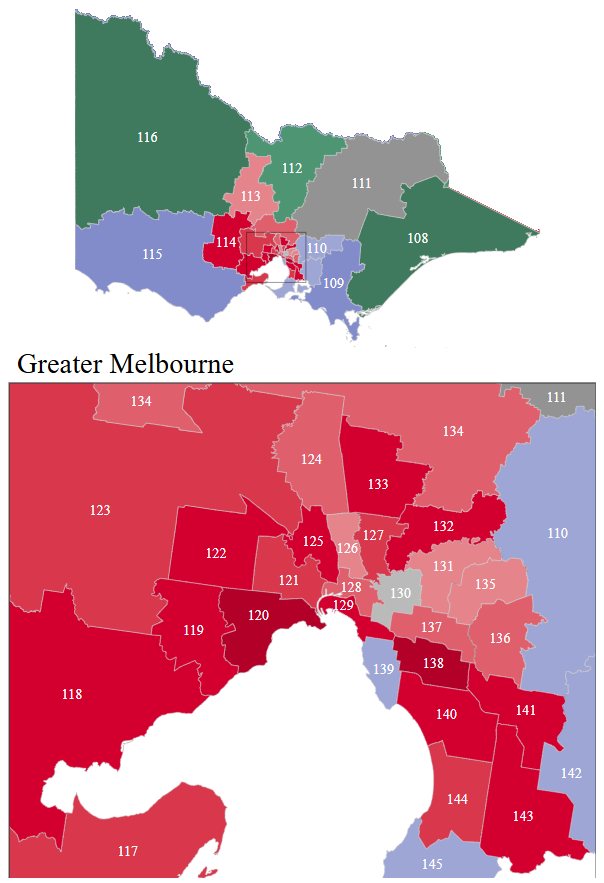

House of Representatives (IRV) – Turnout 92.44% (CV)
Party	Votes	%	Swing (pp)	Seats	Change (seats)
Labor	1,375,995	33.95	+1.10	27	▲3
Liberal–National Coalition	1,304,936	32.20	−0.88	9	▼2
Liberal	1,117,878	27.58	−1.93	6	▼2
Nationals	187,058	4.62	+1.05	3	Steady
Greens	550,659	13.59	−0.15	0	▼1
One Nation	234,482	5.79	+1.96	0	Steady
Family First	89,584	2.21	+2.21	0	Steady
Legalise Cannabis	56,114	1.38	+1.38	0	Steady
Trumpet of Patriots	50,471	1.25	+0.70	0	Steady
Libertarian	24,744	0.61	−1.92	0	Steady
Victorian Socialists	23,652	0.58	−0.15	0	Steady
Socialist Alliance	12,017	0.30	+0.15	0	Steady
Citizens	7,343	0.18	+0.13	0	Steady
Animal Justice	6,548	0.16	−0.59	0	Steady
People First	5,979	0.15	+0.15	0	Steady
Fusion	4,869	0.12	+0.06	0	Steady
Independent	305,184	7.53	+1.02	2	▼1
Not affiliated	487	0.01	+0.01	0	Steady
Total	4,053,064	100.00	–	38	▼1
Invalid/blank votes	179,441	4.24	−0.47	–	–
Turnout	4,232,505	92.44	+1.85	–	–
Registered voters	4,578,453	–	–	–	–
Two-party-preferred vote
Labor	2,283,824	56.35	+1.52		
Liberal–National Coalition	1,769,240	43.65	−1.52		
Source: AEC

Liberal to Labor: Deakin, Menzies
Greens to Labor: Melbourne
Independent to Liberal: Goldstein

=== Queensland ===
2025 Australian federal election (Queensland)
- 3 May 2025

All 30 Queensland seats in the Australian House of Representatives and 6 seats in the Australian Senate
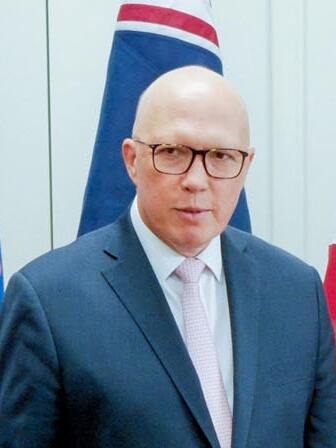

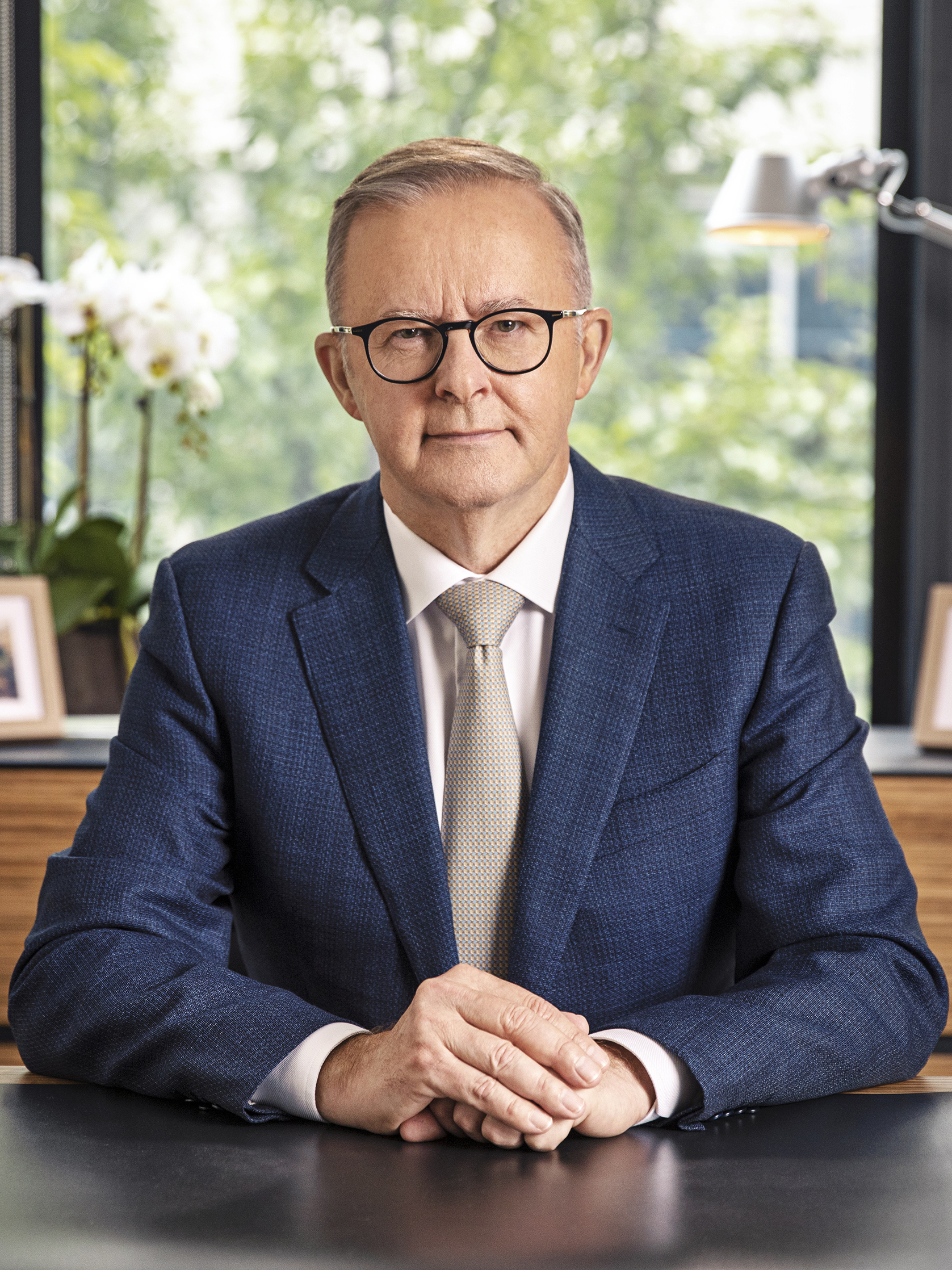

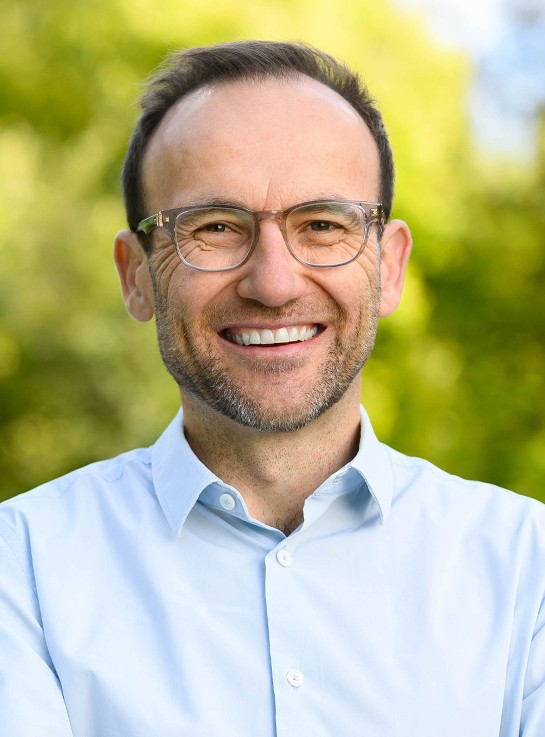

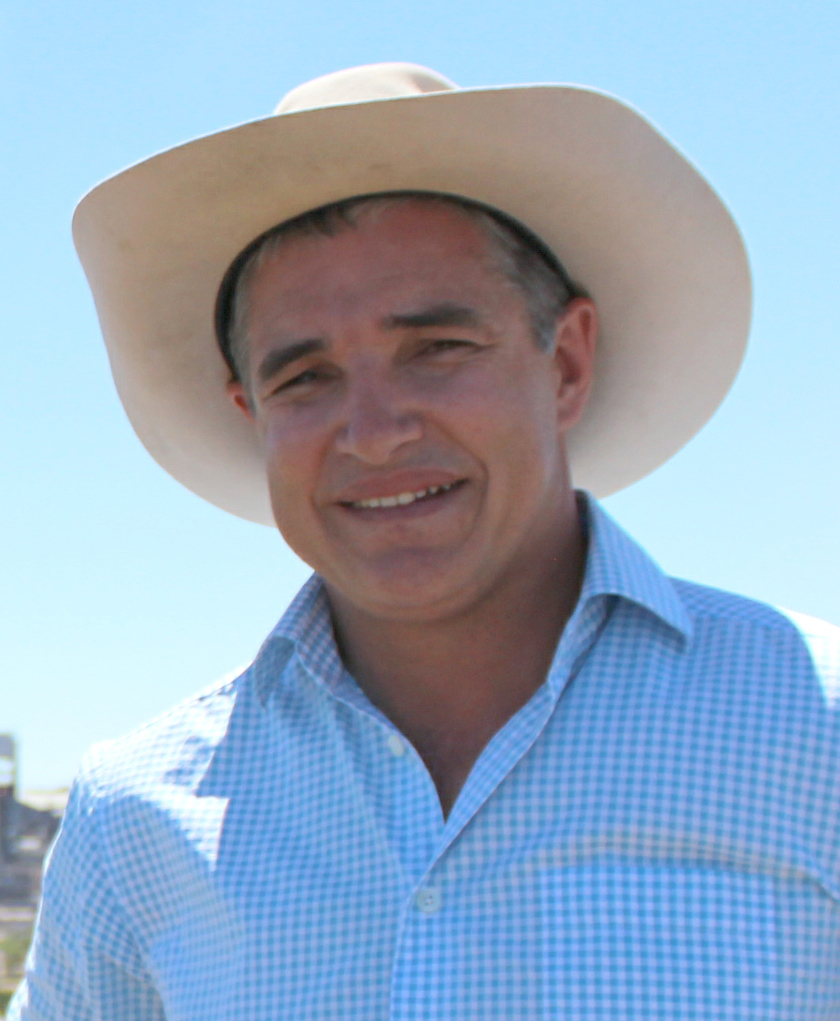
	First party	Second party
Leader	Peter Dutton	Anthony Albanese
Party	Liberal National	Labor
Last election	21 seats	5 seats
Seats won	16	12
Seat change	▼5	▲7
Primary vote	1,099,623	975,848
Percentage	34.91%	30.98%
Swing	▼4.73	▲3.56
TPP	50.58%	49.42%
TPP swing	▼3.47	▲3.47
	Third party	Fourth party
Leader	Adam Bandt	Robbie Katter
Party	Greens	Katter's Australian
Last election	3 seats	1 seat
Seats won	1	1
Seat change	▼2	Steady
Primary vote	370,313	51,775
Percentage	11.76%	1.64%
Swing	▼1.18	▼0.25
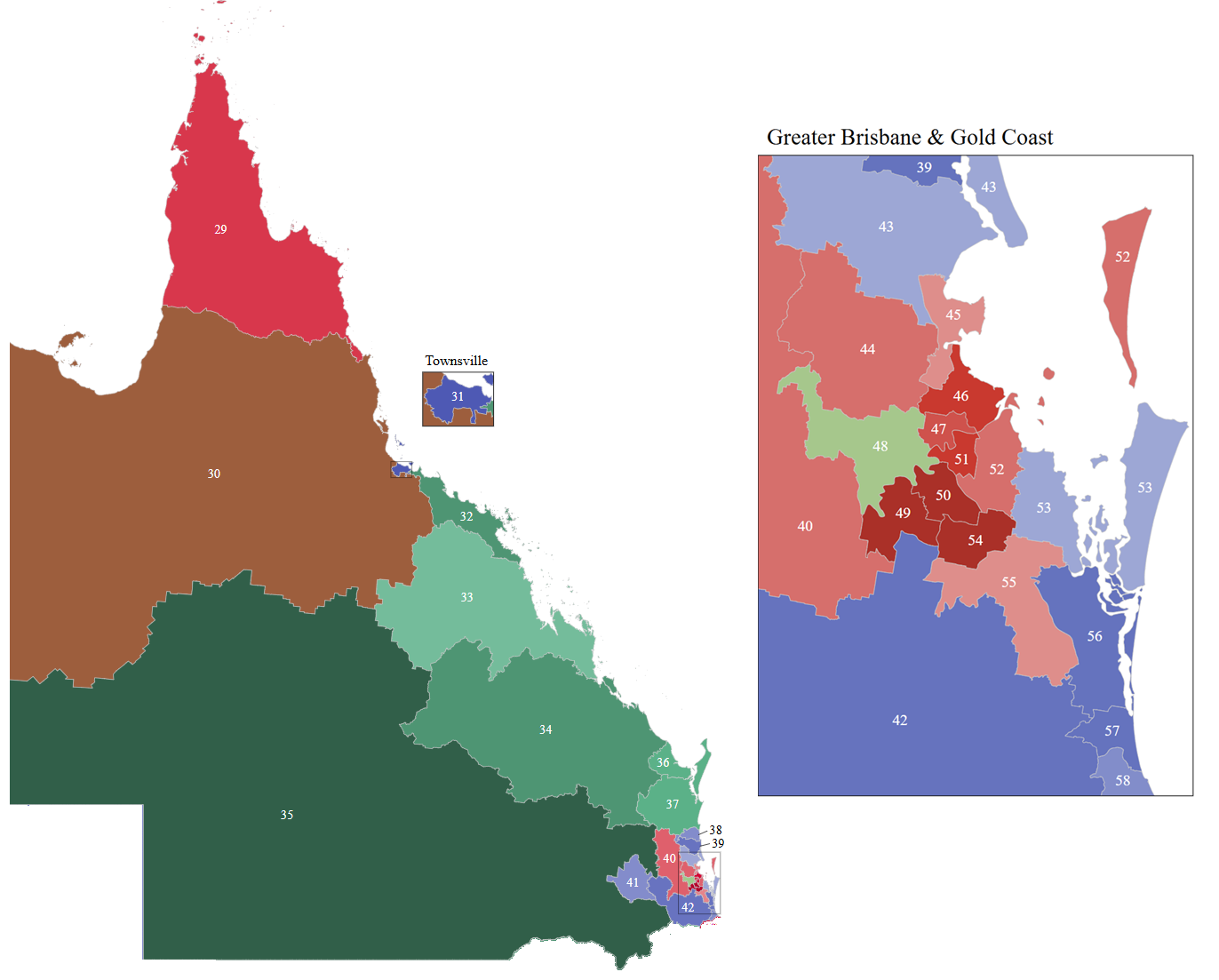

House of Representatives (IRV) – Turnout 88.66% (CV)
Party	Votes	%	Swing (pp)	Seats	Change (seats)
Liberal National	1,099,623	34.91	−4.73	16	▼5
Labor	975,848	30.98	+3.56	12	▲7
Greens	370,313	11.76	−1.18	1	▼2
One Nation	247,071	7.84	+0.35	0	Steady
Trumpet of Patriots	103,287	3.28	+3.00	0	Steady
Family First	83,560	2.65	+2.65	0	Steady
People First	60,471	1.92	+1.92	0	Steady
Katter's Australian	51,775	1.64	−0.25	1	Steady
Legalise Cannabis	18,910	0.60	+0.40	0	Steady
Libertarian	6,606	0.21	−0.76	0	Steady
Animal Justice	6,216	0.20	−0.64	0	Steady
Citizens	2,569	0.08	+0.08	0	Steady
Fusion	2,102	0.07	+0.04	0	Steady
Socialist Alliance	1,634	0.05	−0.08	0	Steady
Independent	118,221	3.75	+1.66	0	Steady
Not affiliated	1,435	0.05	+0.05	0	Steady
Total	3,149,641	100.00	–	30	Steady
Invalid/blank votes	163,467	4.93	+0.76	–	–
Turnout	3,313,108	88.66	+0.50	–	–
Registered voters	3,736,826	–	–	–	–
Two-party-preferred vote
Liberal National	1,593,135	50.58	−3.47		
Labor	1,556,506	49.42	+3.47		
Source: AEC

Liberal to Labor: Bonner, Dickson, Forde, Leichhardt, Petrie
Greens to Labor: Brisbane, Griffith

=== Western Australia ===
2025 Australian federal election (Western Australia)
- 3 May 2025

All 16 Western Australian seats in the Australian House of Representatives and 6 (of 12) Western Australian seats in the Australian Senate
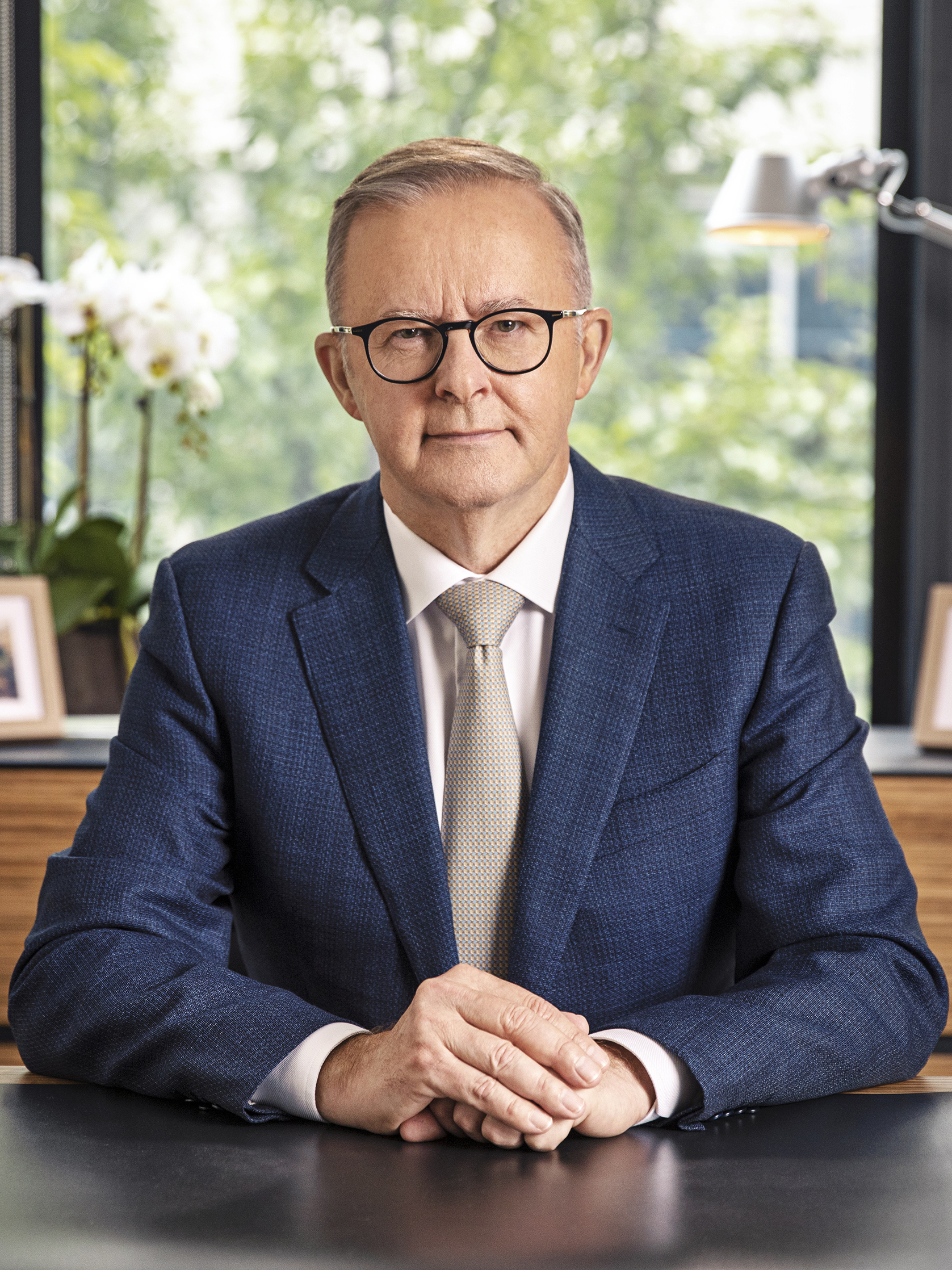

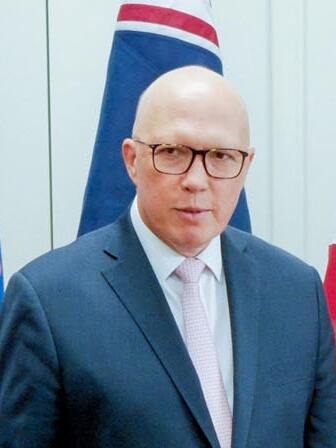
	First party	Second party
Leader	Anthony Albanese	Peter Dutton
Party	Labor	Coalition
Last election	9 seats	5 seats
Seats won	11	4
Seat change	▲2	▼1
Popular vote	568,895	458,187
Percentage	35.59%	28.66%
Swing	▼1.25	▼5.50
TPP	55.84%	44.16%
TPP swing	▲0.84	▼0.84
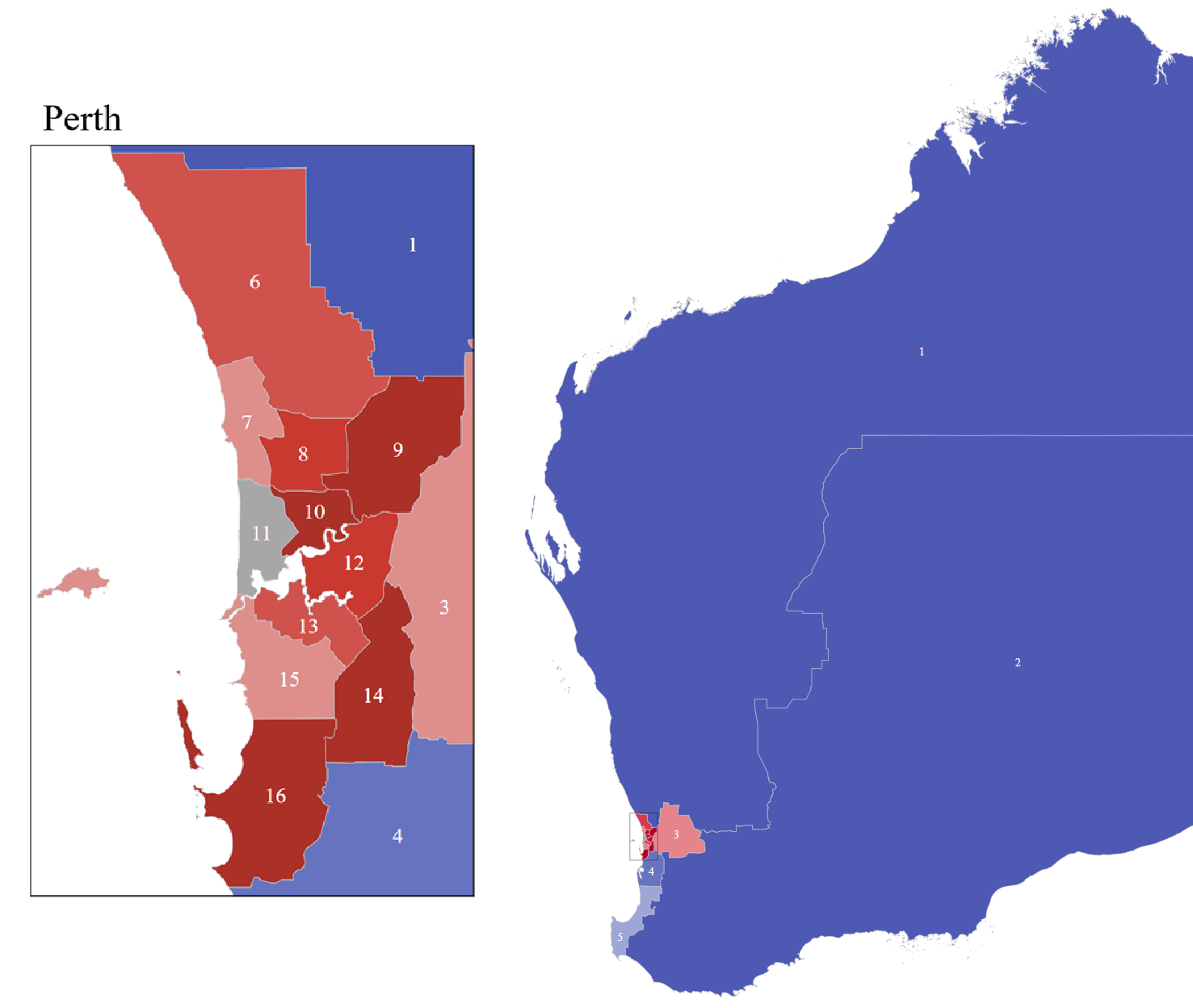

House of Representatives (IRV) – Turnout 88.15% (CV)
Party	Votes	%	Swing (pp)	Seats	Change (seats)
Labor	568,895	35.59	−1.25	11	▲2
Liberal Party of Australia	458,187	28.66	−5.50	4	▼1
National Party of Australia	46,062	2.88	+2.26	0	Steady
Coalition total	504,249	31.54	−3.24	4	▼1
Greens	191,389	11.97	−0.53	0	Steady
One Nation	121,630	7.61	+3.66	0	Steady
Legalise Cannabis	66,547	4.16	+4.16	0	Steady
Christians	31,365	1.96	+0.61	0	Steady
Trumpet of Patriots	9,404	0.59	−0.49	0	Steady
Citizens	2,016	0.13	+0.13	0	Steady
Socialist Alliance	970	0.06	−0.02	0	Steady
Indigenous-Aboriginal	1,872	0.12	+0.12	0	Steady
Great Australian	1,509	0.09	−1.03	0	Steady
Independent	87,987	5.50	+3.06	1	Steady
Not affiliated	10,623	0.66	+0.66	0	Steady
Total	1,598,456	100.00	–	16	▲1
Invalid/blank votes	65,745	3.94	−1.58	–	–
Turnout	1,664,201	88.15	+0.15	–	–
Registered voters	1,888,016	–	–	–	–
Two-party-preferred vote
Labor	892,635	55.84	+0.84		
Liberal	705,821	44.16	−0.84		
Source: AEC

Liberal to Labor: Moore

=== South Australia ===
2025 Australian federal election (South Australia)
- 3 May 2025

All 10 South Australian seats in the Australian House of Representatives 6 of 12 South Australian seats in the Australian Senate
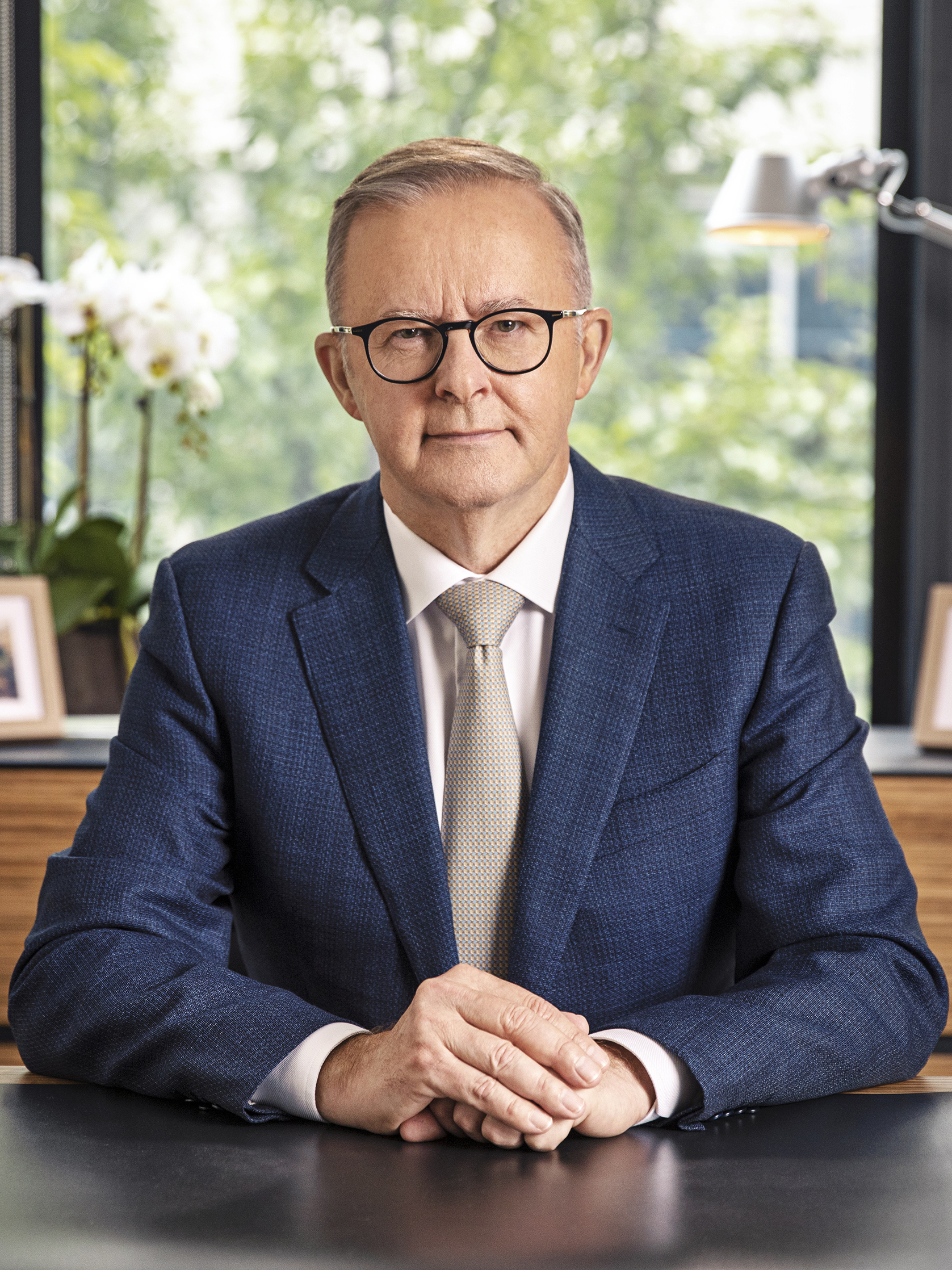

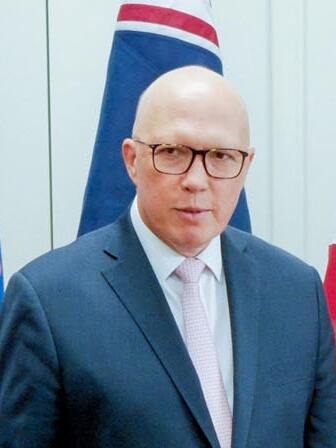

	First party	Second party	Third party
Leader	Anthony Albanese	Peter Dutton	No leader
Party	Labor	Liberal	Centre Alliance
Last election	6 seats	3 seats	1 seat
Seats won	7	2	1
Seat change	▲1	▼1	Steady
Popular vote	433,738	316,915	37,453
Percentage	38.31%	27.99%	3.31%
Swing	▲3.85	▼7.32	▼0.01
TPP	59.20%	40.80%
TPP swing	▲5.23 pp	▼5.23 pp
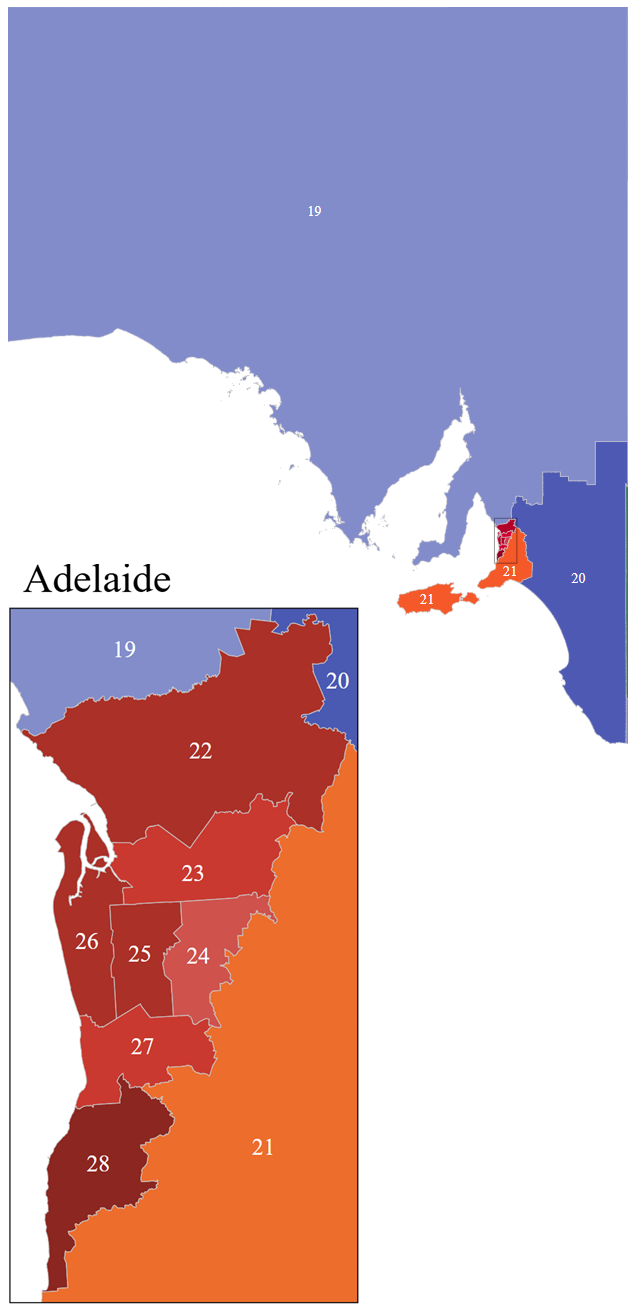
- Results by South Australian division for the House of Representatives.

House of Representatives (IRV) – Turnout 91.47% (CV)
Party	Votes	%	Swing (pp)	Seats	Change (seats)
Labor	433,738	38.31	+3.85	7	▲1
Liberal	316,915	27.99	–7.32	2	▼1
Greens	151,915	13.42	+0.65	0	Steady
One Nation	69,650	6.15	+1.32	0	Steady
Centre Alliance	37,453	3.31	–0.01	1	Steady
Trumpet of Patriots	35,793	3.16	+2.22	0	Steady
Family First	29,293	2.59	+2.59	0	Steady
Animal Justice	11,228	0.99	+0.34	0	Steady
Nationals SA	5,181	0.46	+0.23	0	Steady
Fusion	3,009	0.27	+0.12	0	Steady
Independent	38,063	3.36	+0.67	0	Steady
Total	1,132,238	100.00		10	Steady
Invalid/blank votes	62,907	5.26	+0.14	–	–
Turnout	1,195,145	91.47	+0.39	–	–
Registered voters	1,306,665	–	–	–	–
Two-party-preferred vote
Labor	670,248	59.20	+5.23	7	▲1
Liberal	461,990	40.80	–5.23	2	▼1
Source: AEC

Liberal to Labor: Sturt

=== Tasmania ===
2025 Australian federal election (Tasmania)
- 3 May 2025

All 5 Tasmanian seats in the Australian House of Representatives and 6 seats in the Australian Senate
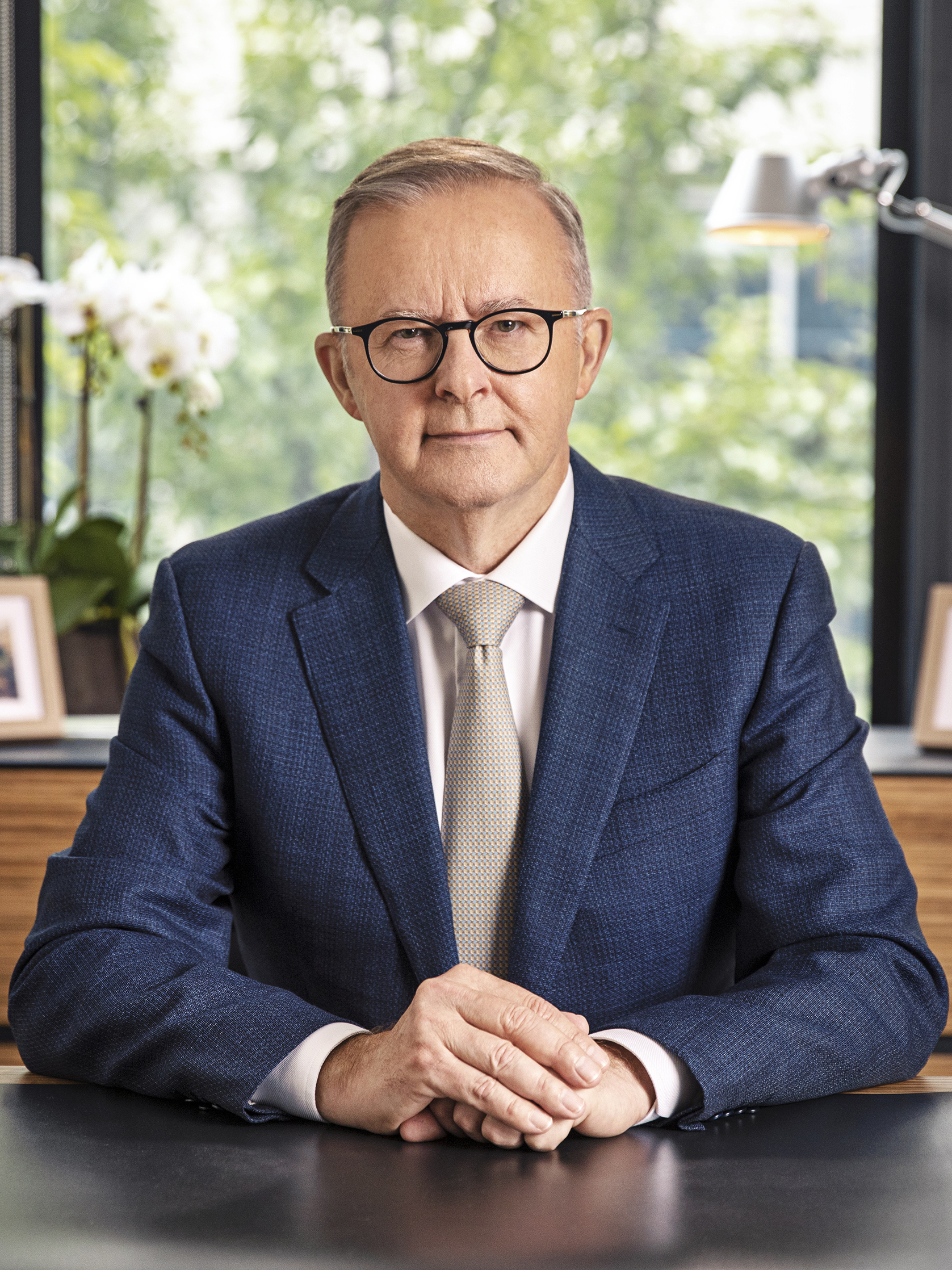

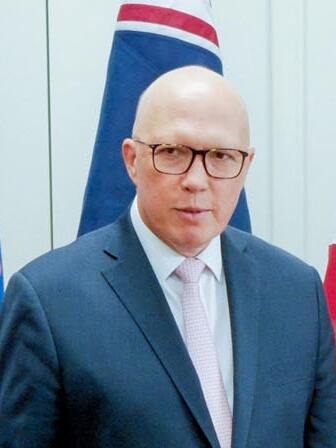
	First party	Second party
Leader	Anthony Albanese	Peter Dutton
Party	Labor	Liberal
Last election	2 seats	2 seats
Seats won	4	0
Seat change	▲2	▼2
Popular vote	134,435	89,988
Percentage	36.60%	24.50%
Swing	▲9.34	▼8.44
TPP	63.34%	36.66%
TPP swing	▲9.01	▼9.01
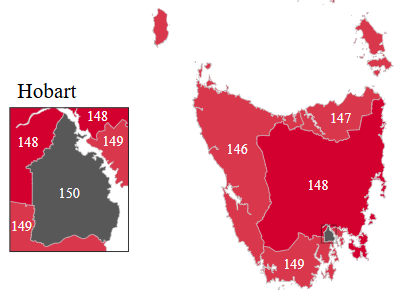

House of Representatives (IRV) – Turnout 93.19% (CV)
Party	Votes	%	Swing (pp)	Seats	Change (seats)
Labor	134,435	36.60	+9.34	4	▲2
Liberal	89,988	24.50	−8.44	0	▼2
Greens	40,833	11.12	−0.88	0	Steady
One Nation	22,140	6.03	+2.04	0	Steady
Trumpet of Patriots	9,275	2.53	+2.53	0	Steady
Shooters, Fishers and Farmers	3,457	0.94	+0.94	0	Steady
Citizens	1,224	0.33	+0.33	0	Steady
Independent	65,907	17.95	+6.80	1	Steady
Total	367,259	100.00		5	Steady
Invalid/blank votes	16,316	4.25	−1.60	–	–
Turnout	383,575	93.19	+0.76	–	–
Registered voters	411,596	–	–	–	–
Two-party-preferred vote
Labor	232,624	63.34	+9.01	4	▲2
Liberal	134,635	36.66	−9.01	0	▼2
Source: AEC

Liberal to Labor: Bass, Braddon

== Territories ==
=== Australian Capital Territory ===
2025 Australian federal election (Australian Capital Territory)
- 3 May 2025

All 3 Australian Capital Territory seats in the Australian House of Representatives and all 2 seats in the Australian Senate
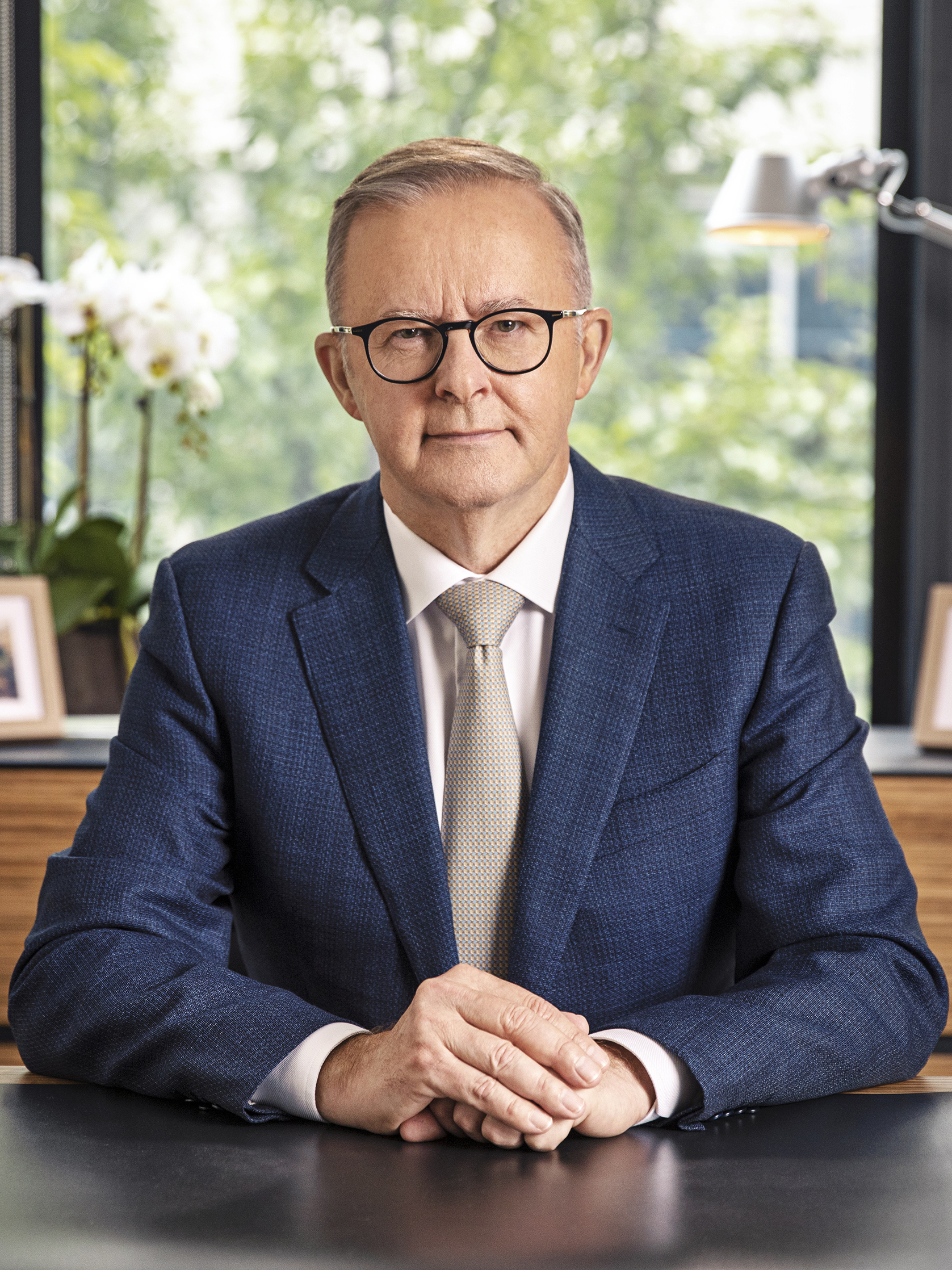

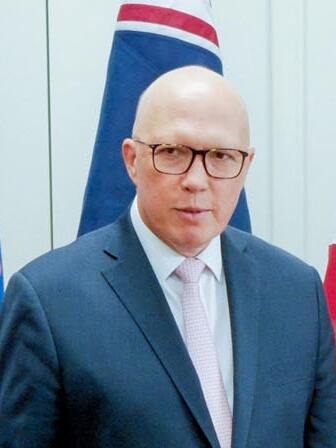
	First party	Second party
Leader	Anthony Albanese	Peter Dutton
Party	Labor	Liberal
Last election	3 seats	0 seats
Seats won	3	0
Seat change	Steady	Steady
Popular vote	138,110	61,489
Percentage	47.53%	21.16%
Swing	▲2.64	▼5.35
TPP	72.49%	27.51%
TPP swing	▲5.54	▼5.54
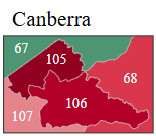

House of Representatives (IRV) – Turnout 92.41% (CV)
Party	Votes	%	Swing (pp)	Seats	Change (seats)
Labor	138,110	47.53	+2.64	3	Steady
Liberal	61,489	21.16	−5.35	0	Steady
Greens	43,753	15.06	−3.61	0	Steady
Family First	7,426	2.56	+2.56	0	Steady
Animal Justice	1,258	0.43	+0.43	0	Steady
HEART	1,222	0.42	+0.42	0	Steady
Independent	37,307	12.84	+8.30	0	Steady
Total	290,565	100.00		3	Steady
Invalid/blank votes	7,254	2.43	−0.02	–	–
Turnout	297,796	92.41	+0.35	–	–
Registered voters	322,246	–	–	–	–
Two-party-preferred vote
Labor	210,627	72.49	+5.54		
Liberal	79,938	27.51	−5.54		
Source: AEC

=== Northern Territory ===
2025 Australian federal election (Northern Territory)
- 3 May 2025

All 2 Northern Territory seats in the Australian House of Representatives and all 2 seats in the Australian Senate
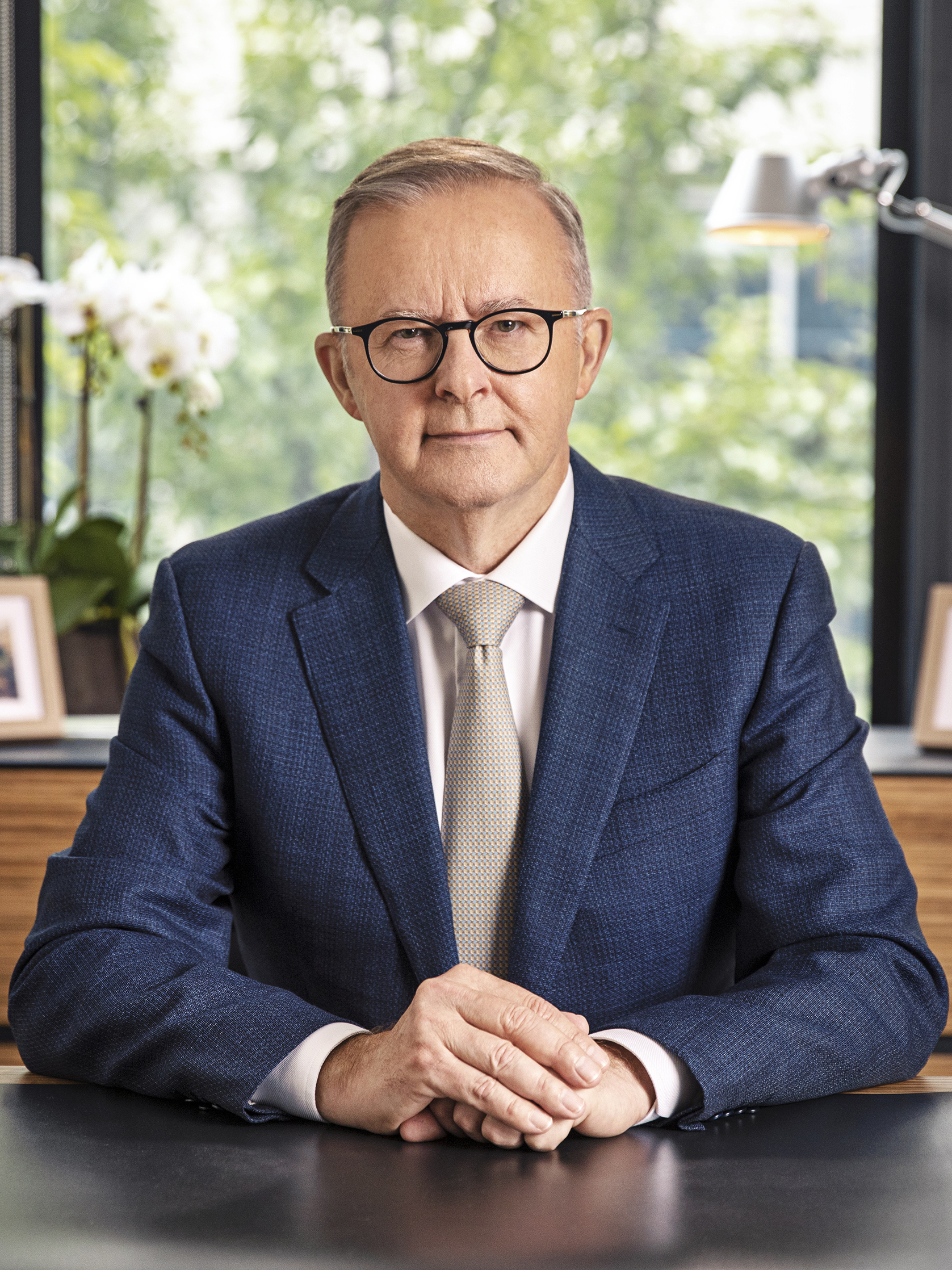

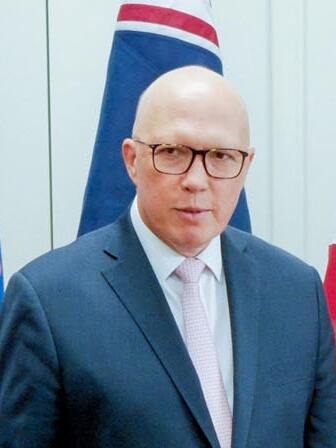
	First party	Second party
Leader	Anthony Albanese	Peter Dutton
Party	Labor	Country Liberal
Last election	2 seats	0 seats
Seats won	2	0
Seat change	Steady	Steady
Popular vote	40,123	35,785
Percentage	37.94%	33.84%
Swing	▼0.22	▲4.45
TPP	54.25%	45.75%
TPP swing	▼1.29	▲1.29
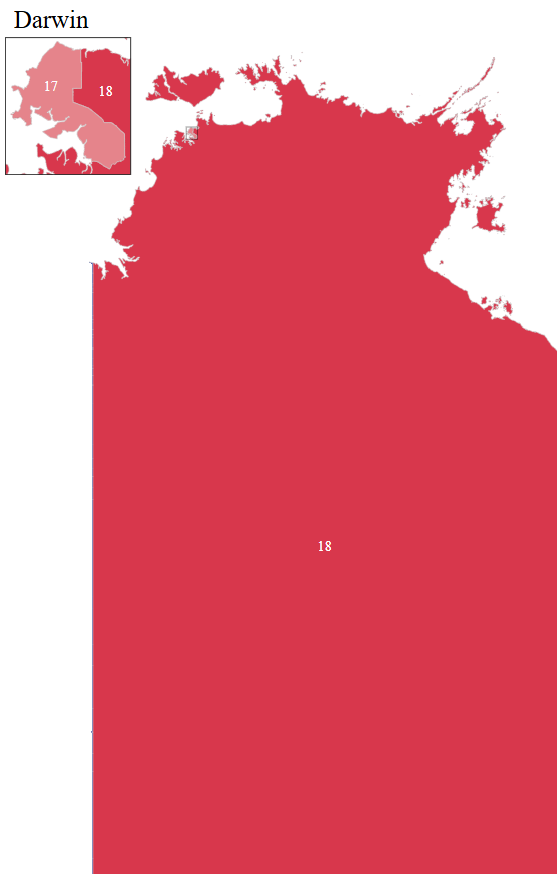

House of Representatives (IRV) – Turnout 70.83% (CV)
Party	Votes	%	Swing (pp)	Seats	Change (seats)
Labor	40,123	37.94	−0.22	2	Steady
Country Liberal	35,785	33.84	+4.45	0	Steady
Greens	10,813	10.22	−2.84	0	Steady
One Nation	8,165	7.72	+2.35	0	Steady
Citizens	1,365	1.29	+0.80	0	Steady
Indigenous-Aboriginal	1,317	1.25	+1.25	0	Steady
Independent	8,194	7.75	+6.41	0	Steady
Total	105,762	100.00		2	Steady
Invalid/blank votes	4,397	3.99	−1.32	–	–
Turnout	110,159	70.83	−2.25	–	–
Registered voters	155,519	–	–	–	–
Two-party-preferred vote
Labor	57,377	54.25	–1.29		
Country Liberal	48,385	45.75	+1.29		
Source: AEC

== Two party preferred preference flow ==
House of Representatives (IRV – Turnout 90.70% (CV)
Party	Coalition			Labor		
Party	Votes	%	±	Votes	%	±
Greens	223,126	11.81%	–2.53	1,666,851	88.19%	+2.53
One Nation	738,897	74.50%	+10.2	252,917	25.50%	-10.2
Trumpet of Patriots	188,922	63.81%		107,154	36.19%	
Family First	177,850	64.98%		95,831	35.02%	
People First	55,978	77.86%		15,914	22.14%	
Libertarian	60,556	72.54%	+0.73	22,918	27.46%	-0.73
Animal Justice	11,999	33.98%	–2.13	23,313	66.02%	+2.13
Katter's Australian	32,369	62.52%	+1.21	19,406	37.48%	-1.21
Centre Alliance	14,729	39.33%	-0.43	22,724	60.67%	+0.43
Great Australian	901	59.71%	+7.42	608	40.29%	-7.42
Victorian Socialists	2,877	12.16%	-4.39	20,775	87.84%	+4.39
Informed Medical Options	3,537	68.84%	+15.08	1,601	31.16%	-15.08
Christians	23,620	75.31%	–1.07	7,745	24.69%	+1.07
Shooters, Fishers, Farmers	15,570	57.74%	–0.87	11,398	42.26%	+0.87
Fusion	3,711	25.82%	–4.90	10,663	74.18%	+4.90
Socialist Alliance	3,309	17.74%	-7.61	15,344	82.26%	+7.61
Indigenous-Aboriginal	2,083	33.03%	–14.68	4,223	66.97%	+14.68
Legalise Cannabis	72,682	39.01%	–3.71	113,653	60.99%	+3.71
Citizens	9,186	44.23%	-0.20	11,584	55.77%	+0.20
Democrats	221	32.12%	-1.98	467	67.88%	+1.98
Independents	369,855	32.85%	–3.38	756,196	67.15%	+3.38
Total	14,659,042	100.00		151	Steady	
Two-party-preferred vote
Labor		8,553,231	55.22	+		
Liberal−National Coalition		6,937,005	44.78	−		
Invalid/blank votes					–	–
Turnout					–	–
Registered voters			–	–	–	–
Source: AEC for both votes

== Analysis ==
=== Swing table ===
State/territory	TPP		
State/territory	ALP	LNP	Swing (to ALP)
Australia	55.22	44.78	+3.09
New South Wales	55.27	44.73	+3.85
Victoria	56.35	43.65	+1.52
Queensland	49.42	50.58	+3.47
Western Australia	55.84	44.16	+0.84
South Australia	59.20	40.80	+5.23
Tasmania	63.34	36.66	+9.01
Australian Capital Territory	72.49	27.51	+5.54
Northern Territory	54.25	45.75	–1.29
