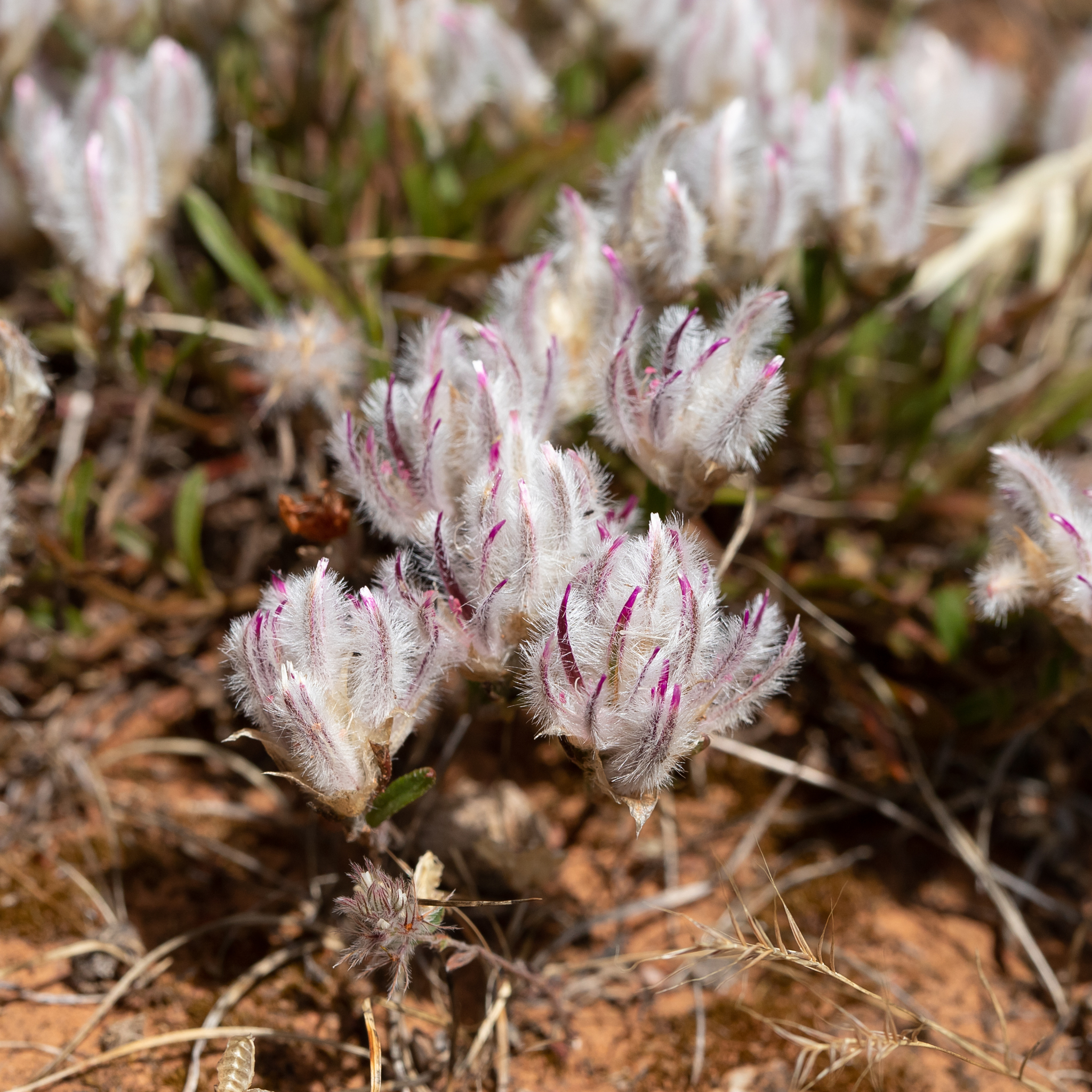

Scientific classification
- Kingdom: Plantae
- Clade: Tracheophytes
- Clade: Angiosperms
- Clade: Eudicots
- Order: Caryophyllales
- Family: Amaranthaceae
- Genus: Ptilotus
- Species: P. erubescens

Binomial name
- Ptilotus erubescens Schltdl.

Synonyms
- Ptilotus crubescens Schltdl. orth. var.; Trichinium erubescens (Schltdl.) Moq.; Trichinium fusiforme var. majus Nees p.p.; Trichinium linifolium A.Cunn. ex Moq. p.p.

= Ptilotus erubescens =

Species of grass-like plant

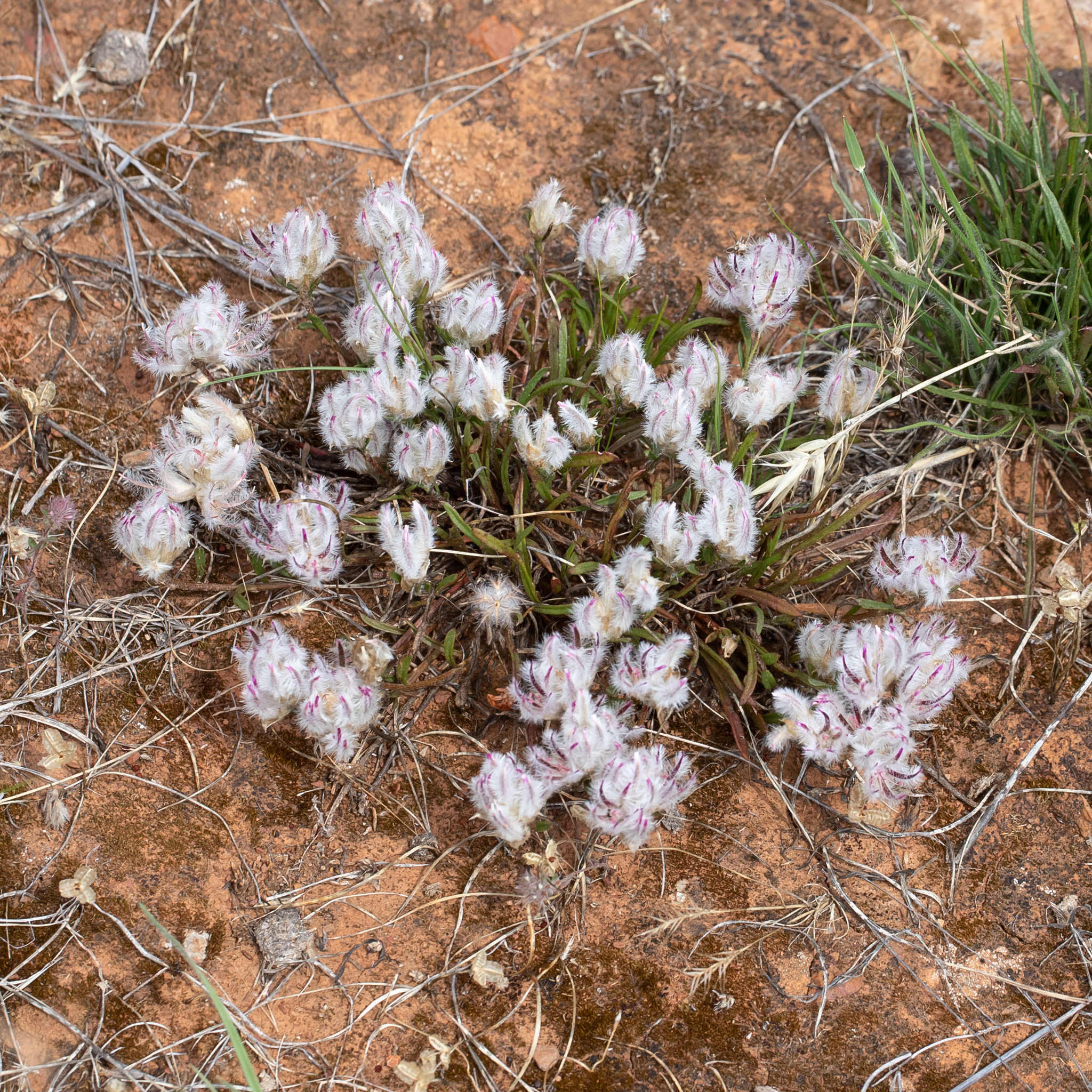
Habit near Mount Bryan

Ptilotus erubescens, commonly known as hairy heads or hairy tails, is a species of flowering plant in the family Amaranthaceae and is endemic to south-eastern continental Australia. It is an erect, hairy perennial plant with linear to broadly linear stem leaves and white, grey or pink-tinged, spherical or oval spikes of flowers.

== Description ==
Ptilotus erubescens is an erect perennial plant with a woody tap root with stems up to 25 cm (9.8 in) long, and that is hairy, especially when young. The stem leaves are linear to broadly linear, up to 30 mm (1.2 in) long and 3 mm (0.12 in) wide with scattered hairs. The flowers are borne in white, grey or pink-tinged, spherical or oval heads. There are straw-coloured bracts and bracteoles 6–12 mm (0.24–0.47 in) long, the tepals about 12 mm (0.47 in) long and hairy. There are four stamens and a single staminode, the ovary is sessile and covered with woolly hairs. Flowering occurs from November to February.

== Taxonomy ==
Ptilotus erubescens was first formally described in 1847 by Diederich Franz Leonhard von Schlechtendal in the journal Linnaea from specimens collected near Gawler. The specific epithet (erubescens) means 'reddening' or 'blushing'.

== Distribution and habitat ==
This species of Ptilotus grows in relatively fertile and red-earth soils in grassland and woodland, mainly in the Yanco-Deniliquin of western New South Wales, in northern and eastern Victoria and in the south-east of South Australia,

== Conservation status ==
Ptilotus erubescens is listed as "critically endangered" under the Victorian Government Flora and Fauna Guarantee Act 1988.

== See also ==
- List of Ptilotus species
