= North Booborowie, South Australia =

North Booborowie South Australia
- Coordinates: 33.51°S 138.82°E
- Population: 21 (SAL 2021)
- Postcode(s): 5417
- LGA(s): Regional Council of Goyder
- State electorate(s): Stuart
- Federal division(s): Grey
Localities around North Booborowie:
Hacklins Corner	Willalo	Hallett
Spalding	North Booborowie	Mount Bryan
Spalding	Booborowie	Mount Bryan
- Footnotes: Coordinates

North Booborowie is a rural locality in the Mid North region of South Australia, situated in the Regional Council of Goyder. It was established in August 2008, when boundaries were formalised for the "long established local name". In early days, the North Booborowie name was sometimes used synonymously with Willalo, which is now gazetted as a separate locality to its north.

The area was once part of the North Booborowie pastoral station, which was purchased by the state government for closer settlement in 1911 and divided into 89 blocks.

North Booborowie School opened on 29 April 1914 and closed in 1965, with the remaining five students transferred to the Willalo school. A postal receiving office opened at North Booborowie on 12 November 1923, was upgraded to a post office on 1 January 1927, provisionally closed on 12 September 1956, and permanently closed on 30 April 1957. The area was once also home to the North Booborowie Government Experimental Farm.

The locality is zoned for use in primary production, variously for either agriculture or grazing purposes.
