= George Henry Prosser =

Businessman and politician in South Australia (1867–1941)

George Henry Prosser (ca.1867 – 22 August 1941) was a businessman and politician in South Australia.

== History ==
George Prosser was born at Gawler River and was a student at the Grote Street school.

He was a member of the Adelaide City Council for 27 years, and an alderman in 1933. He was mayor of the Town of Kensington and Norwood from 1907 to 1912. He was a member of the Chamber of Commerce, and served as president. He was a director of Wallaroo-Mount Lyell Fertilisers Ltd. and chairman 1931–1933. He was also on the board of Adelaide Cement and Wilkinson & Co., Ltd, Elder's Trustee and Executor Co. Ltd.

He was a member of the Legislative Council for Central District No. 2 from 1921 to 1933.

He was captain of the Marryatville Bowling Club.

== Family ==
On 29 November 1893 he married Emalia Rosa "Emily" Robinson in November 1893. They had two daughters:

- Gladys Prosser (30 October 1894 – ) married Charles Ashley Foale (1884–1938) on 6 June 1917. Gladys was an accomplished singer.
- Joyce Prosser (22 December 1901 – ) married Leslie Carrington Maiden BDS on 15 July 1926

They had homes "Ralston", Northumberland Road, Marryatville; and "Ralston", 11 Stannington Avenue, Heathpool.
