= Indigenous-Aboriginal Party of Australia =

- Abbreviation: Indigenous Party of Australia, IAPA
- Convenor: Owen Whyman (Paakantyi, Malyangapa)
- Founder: Owen Whyman
- Founded: October 2020; 5 years ago
- Registered: 29 November 2021
- Headquarters: Wilcannia, New South Wales
- Membership (2026): ▲3,700
- Ideology: Indigenous rights
- Colours: Green, orange
- House of Representatives: 0 / 151
- Senate: 0 / 76

Website
- indigenouspartyofaustralia.com

The Indigenous-Aboriginal Party of Australia, also known simply as the Indigenous Party of Australia, is a minor Australian political party, launched and based in Wilcannia, New South Wales. The party's main objective is to tackle Indigenous issues and for Indigenous rights and to stop development projects destroying native land. It was formed in 2020, and gained federal registration on 29 November 2021. As of November 2021, it is stated to have over 2,000 members.

The party was formed in October 2020 by Uncle Owen Whyman, who is of Paakantyi and Malyangapa origin, and is open to Indigenous and non-Indigenous people. However, all party Executive members and candidates must be Indigenous.

The party had six candidates for the 2022 federal election, with Whyman running in the Senate for New South Wales.
