= Ngurunta =

Aboriginal Australian people

The Ngurunta or Runda are believed to have been an indigenous Australian people of the state of South Australia located immediately west of Lake Frome.

== Language ==
A fragmentary list of words ascribed to the Ngurunta people was included in the second volume of Edward Curr's The Australian Race: Its Origins, Languages, Customs (1886-1887). (Note: Both are available in Curr (1886, pp. 173, 180)) According to Luise Hercus and Peter Austin, however, the vocabulary indicates not a dialect of the Yarli languages, but rather Paakantyi.

== People ==
The number of testimonies surviving concerning the Ngurunta are exiguous, leading to some suspicions that a tribe of this name may not have existed. Norman Tindale inserted them into a territory he had earlier divided up between the Yardliyawara and Wadikali tribes, doing so on the basis of information provided to him by just one informant in the 1960s, and on the fact that Edward Curr's early work had also named such a group.

== Country ==
Ngurunta territory was harsh sandhill country that extended over an estimated 6,500 square miles (17,000 km^{2}) of land from west of the Barrier and Coko Ranges to the eastern edges of Lake Frome, north of the Flinders Ranges. Its southern boundary was marked by Eurinilla Creek. In the north, its boundaries lay around Lake Boolka and Yandama Creek. The Malyangapa were on their eastern boundary.

== History ==
As European colonization strengthened remnants of the Ngurunta are thought to have sought refuge among the Malyangapa.

== Some words ==
- tulta (kangaroo)
- kalli (tame dog)

== Alternative names ==
- Runta, Runda

== Sources ==
- Anonymous (1886). "Country north-west of the Barrier Range". In Curr, Edward Micklethwaite (ed.). The Australian race: its origin, languages, customs, place of landing in Australia and the routes by which it spread itself over the continent (PDF). Vol. 2. Melbourne: John Ferrer, Government Printer. p. 173.
- Hercus, Luise; Austin, Peter (2004). "The Yarli languages". In Bowern, Claire; Koch, Harold (eds.). Australian Languages: Classification and the Comparative Method. John Benjamins Publishing. pp. 207–222. ISBN 978-9-027-24761-2.
- Reid, James A. (1886). "Torrowotto". In Curr, Edward Micklethwaite (ed.). The Australian race: its origin, languages, customs, place of landing in Australia and the routes by which it spread itself over the continent (PDF). Vol. 2. Melbourne: John Ferrer, Government Printer. pp. 178–181.
- Tindale, Norman Barnett (1974). "Ngurunta (SA)". Aboriginal Tribes of Australia: Their Terrain, Environmental Controls, Distribution, Limits, and Proper Names. Australian National University Press. ISBN 978-0-708-10741-6.
