= Malyangapa =

Indigenous people of far north-west NSW, Australia

The Malyangaapa are an Indigenous Australian people who live in the far north western areas of the state of New South Wales.

== Language ==
The Malyangapa spoke a dialect of the Yarli language.

== Country ==
Malyangaapa country extends over some 5,900 square miles (15,000 km^{2}) with its centre at Milparinka around the head of Yancannie Creek. To the east their boundaries ran to beyond Mount Arrowsmith. The southern boundaries lay around Mutawintji and Sturt Meadow.

== Culture ==
The Malyangapa practised circumcision as a rite for males undergoing initiation. In their dreaming lore the primordial creator-figure, rainbow serpent was called kakurra (corresponding to the Ngatyi of the Paakantyi and the akurra of their western neighbours, the Adnyamathanha. They shared close cultural and marriage links with the neighbouring Wanjiwalku.

== History of contact ==
Reid states that settlement of Malyangapa lands began in 1862/1863, at which time they were thought to number 200. Within the decade this figure dropped by a quarter (150), and after 15 years of contact (1879), Reid estimated only roughly 60 had survived, half of whom were under fourteen. Among these was a remnant of the Ngurunta. (Note: Tindale cites Morton, with Reid, for the Malyangapa. Both name the tribe as in the locality of Lake Torrowotto, Reid calls the group Milya-uppa and Morton calls them the Mulya-napa, which Tindale considered a variant name for the Malyangapa. Morton reckoned the number in his area at around 1,000 in 1864. Within a decade and a half, their numbers had declined radically, and were estimated in 1880 to amount to 347 persons, ten of whom were half-castes.)

== Alternative names ==
- Maljangaba
- Malya-napa, Mulya-napa, Mulya-nappa
- Milya-uppa
- Mullia-arpa, Muliaarpa
- Malynapa, Malja:pa, Malyapa
- Maljangaba
- Nalyanapa (perhaps a misprint)
- Malgangara
- Karikari (kari means yes)
- Bulalli, Bulali (meaning 'hill people')

== Some words ==
- talda (kangaroo)
- koonoo (tame dog)
- urlka (wild dog)
- koomarde (father)
- armunde (mother)
- tootoo (white man)
- bula (hill)
- kari (yes)
- wii (fire/firewood)
- kalithi (emu)

== Sources ==
- Austin, Peter; Hercus, Luise (2004). "The Yarli Languages". In Bowern, Claire; Koch, Harold (eds.). Australian Languages: Classification and the comparative method. John Benjamins Publishing Company. pp. 207–222. ISBN 978-9-027-29511-8.
- Beckett, Jeremy; Hercus, Luise (2009a). The Two Rainbow Serpents Travelling: Mura Track Narratives from the 'Corner Country'. Australian National University Press. ISBN 978-1-921-53693-9.
- Beckett, Jeremy; Hercus, Luise (2009b). "Geographical names in the Two Ngatyi Stories" (PDF). The Two Rainbow Serpents Travelling: Mura Track Narratives from the 'Corner Country'. Australian National University Press. ISBN 978-1-921-53693-9.
- Morton, A. W. (1886). "Near the North-west corner of New South Wales" (PDF). In Curr, Edward Micklethwaite (ed.). The Australian race: its origin, languages, customs, place of landing in Australia and the routes by which it spread itself over the continent. Vol. 2. Melbourne: J. Ferres. pp. 158–161.
- Reid, James A. (1886). "Torrowotto". In Curr, Edward Micklethwaite (ed.). The Australian race: its origin, languages, customs, place of landing in Australia and the routes by which it spread itself over the continent (PDF). Vol. 2. Melbourne: John Ferrer, Government Printer. pp. 178–181.
- Tindale, Norman Barnett (1974). "Maljangapa (NSW)". Aboriginal Tribes of Australia: Their Terrain, Environmental Controls, Distribution, Limits, and Proper Names. Australian National University Press. ISBN 978-0-708-10741-6.
