= Mount Bryan, South Australia =

Mount Bryan
- Town
- Coordinates: 33.5506°S 138.8934°E
- Country: Australia
- State: South Australia
- LGA: Regional Council of Goyder
- Location: 128 km (80 mi) north of Adelaide; 70 km (43 mi) south of Peterborough; 16 km (9.9 mi) north of Burra

Government
  - State electorate: Electoral district of Stuart
  - Federal division: Division of Grey

Population
  - Total: 114 (SAL 2021)
- Postcode: 5418
Localities around Mount Bryan
Willalo; North Booborowie	Hallett	Mount Bryan East
Booborowie	Mount Bryan	Mount Bryan East; Burra
Burra	Burra	Burra

Mount Bryan is a town in the Mid North of South Australia. The town is situated on the Barrier Highway 20 kilometres (12 mi) north of Burra, in the Regional Council of Goyder.

The town was named after a nearby peak, Mount Bryan, which was named on 12 December 1839 by Governor George Gawler after a travelling companion, Henry Bryan. They were part of an exploration party which included Charles Sturt and Henry Inman. Bryan later became separated from the group and most likely died of thirst, but his body was never found.

Once the heart of a thriving farming community, including some of Australia's best known Merino sheep studs, the town today is largely represented by the Mount Bryan Hotel—an old pub.

At the northern end of the Mount Lofty Ranges, the views of and from the surrounding hills are scenic. A popular route is north east to Sir Hubert Wilkins cottage, the restored home in which the polar explorer was born and grew up.

The addition of Hallett Wind Farm in the late 2000s and early 2010s has seen wind generating energy from some of the ridge-tops north of Mount Bryan.

The historic Mackerode Homestead is listed on the South Australian Heritage Register.i
